= Ralph P. Martin =

British New Testament scholar (1925–2013)

- Born: 4 August 1925; Anfield, Liverpool
- Died: 25 February 2013 (aged 87)
- Occupation: New Testament scholar

Academic background
- Education: Liverpool Collegiate School, University of Manchester, King's College London

Academic work
- Discipline: Biblical studies
- Sub-discipline: NT studies
- Notable works: The Epistle of Paul to the Philippians (TNTC)

Ralph Philip Martin (4 August 1925 – 25 February 2013) was a British New Testament scholar.

Martin was born in Anfield, Liverpool, England and was educated at the Liverpool Collegiate School, the University of Manchester and King's College London. He taught at the London Bible College, the University of Manchester, the University of Sheffield, Azusa Pacific University, and Fuller Theological Seminary.

He trained for the Baptist ministry at Manchester Baptist College, and was ordained in 1949. He married Lily Nelson and they had two children; after Lily’s death, he married Doreen Jones.

He served as a pastor for 10 years before going into teaching. He taught in England for 10 years before joining Fuller in California; he worked there for almost 20 years before returning to England in 1988.

While in the US, Martin published several books on the New Testament, and edited several others. Martin wrote commentaries on Mark, Romans, Philippians, and James.

In 1992, a Festschrift was published in his honour, Worship, Theology and Ministry in the Early Church: Essays in Honor of Ralph P. Martin, which included contributions from James Dunn, E. Earle Ellis, Donald Guthrie, I. Howard Marshall, and Leon Morris.

== Works ==
=== Books ===
- Martin, Ralph P. (1959). The Epistle of Paul to the Philippians: an introduction and commentary. Tyndale New Testament Commentaries. Grand Rapids, MI; Leicester: Eerdmans; Inter-Varsity Press. ISBN 978-0-802-82261-1. OCLC 383367.
- ——— (1964). Worship in the Early Church. Grand Rapids, MI: Eerdmans. ISBN 978-0-802-81613-9. OCLC 1341551.
- ——— (1967). Carmen Christi; Philippians ii. 5-11 in recent interpretation and in the setting of early Christian worship. Society for New Testament Studies, Monograph series. Vol. 4. London: Cambridge University Press. OCLC 1169689.
- ———; Gasque, W. Ward, eds. (1970). Apostolic History and the Gospel: Biblical and historical essays presented to F.F. Bruce on his 60th birthday. Grand Rapids, MI: Eerdmans. OCLC 127277.
- ——— (1972). Mark, Evangelist and Theologian. Exeter: Paternoster Press. ISBN 978-0-853-64130-8. OCLC 628917.
- ——— (1972). Colossians: the Church's Lord and the Christian's liberty; an expository commentary with a present-day application. Grand Rapids, MI: Zondervan. ISBN 978-0-853-64125-4. OCLC 687988.
- ——— (1991). Ephesians, Colossians, and Philemon. Atlanta, GA: John Knox Press. ISBN 978-0-804-23139-8. OCLC 24626388.
- ——— (1975). New Testament Foundations: A Guide for Christian Students, Volume 1: The Four Gospels. Grand Rapids, MI: Eerdmans. ISBN 978-0-802-83444-7. OCLC 1046974.
- ——— (1978). New Testament Foundations: A Guide for Christian Students, Volume 2: The Acts, the Letters, the Apocalypse. Grand Rapids, MI: Eerdmans. ISBN 978-0-802-83506-2. OCLC 1046974.
- ——— (1979). The Family and the Fellowship: New Testament images of the church. Grand Rapids, MI: Eerdmans. ISBN 978-0-802-81829-4. OCLC 5946359.
- ——— (1980). Reconciliation: a study of Paul's theology. Atlanta, GA: John Knox Press. ISBN 978-0-804-23709-3. OCLC 6305027.
- ——— (1982). The Worship of God: some theological, pastoral, and practical reflections. Grand Rapids, MI: Eerdmans. ISBN 978-0-802-81934-5. OCLC 8410919.
- ——— (1984). The Spirit and the Congregation: studies in 1 Corinthians 12-15. Grand Rapids, MI: Eerdmans. ISBN 978-0-802-83608-3. OCLC 10800492.
- ——— (1984). New Testament Books for Pastor and teacher. Philadelphia, PA: Westminster Press. ISBN 978-0-664-24511-5. OCLC 10018802.
- ——— (1986). 2 Corinthians. Word Biblical Commentary. Vol. 40. Waco, TX: Word Books. ISBN 978-0-849-90239-0. OCLC 12999373.
- ——— (1988). James. Word Biblical Commentary. Vol. 48. Waco, TX: Word Books. ISBN 978-0-849-90247-5. OCLC 18533094.
- ———; Hawthorne, Gerald F.; Reid, Daniel G., eds. (1993). Dictionary of Paul and His Letters. IVP Bible Dictionary Series. Vol. 7. Downers Grove, IL: InterVarsity Press. ISBN 978-0-830-81778-8. OCLC 28798028.
- ———; Chester, Andrew (1994). The Theology of the Letters of James, Peter, and Jude. Cambridge, England; New York: Cambridge University Press. ISBN 978-0-521-35631-2. OCLC 29258781.
- ———; Davids, Peter H., eds. (1997). Dictionary of the Later New Testament & Its Developments. IVP Bible Dictionary Series. Vol. 8. Downers Grove, IL: InterVarsity Press. ISBN 978-0-830-81779-5. OCLC 37437668.
- ——— (1997). A Hymn of Christ: Philippians 2:5-11 in recent interpretation & in the setting of early Christian worship. Downers Grove, IL: InterVarsity Press. ISBN 978-0-830-81894-5. OCLC 37432887.—original published as Carmen Christi
