= Joel B. Green =

American theologian and academic

- Born: May 7, 1956 (age 70)
- Occupation: Professor of New Testament Interpretation at Fuller Theological Seminary in Pasadena, California.
- Known for: New Testament scholar, theologian, author
- Board member of: Editorial boards of the journals Science and Theology and Science & Christian Belief

Academic background
- Education: Texas Tech University, Perkins School of Theology at Southern Methodist University
- Alma mater: University of Aberdeen

Academic work
- Discipline: Biblical studies
- Sub-discipline: New Testament studies
- Institutions: American Baptist Seminary of the West; Graduate Theological Union; Fuller Theological Seminary
- Notable works: Dictionary of Jesus and the Gospels; The Gospel of Luke (NICNT)
- Website: https://joelbgreen.substack.com

Joel B. Green (born May 7, 1956) is an American New Testament scholar, theologian, author, Associate Dean of the Center for Advanced Theological Study, and Professor of New Testament Interpretation at Fuller Theological Seminary in Pasadena, California. Green is a prolific author who has written on a diverse range of topics related to both New Testament scholarship and theology. He is an ordained elder of the United Methodist Church.

== Education ==
Green holds the academic degrees of Bachelor of Science, conferred by Texas Tech University in 1978, Master of Theology, received in 1982 from the Perkins School of Theology at Southern Methodist University; and Doctor of Philosophy from the University of Aberdeen, Scotland, obtained in 1985.

== Career ==
From 1992 to 1997 Green was associate professor of New Testament Interpretation at the American Baptist Seminary of the West and the Graduate Theological Union in Berkeley, California. From 1997 to 2007 he was a professor at Asbury Seminary in Wilmore, Kentucky, dean of the School of Theology, and provost, before taking up the post of Professor of New Testament Interpretation at Fuller Theological Seminary in Pasadena, California. In 2011, Green was named as the general editor of the New International Commentary on the New Testament (NICNT). He has served as chair of the Council of the Society of Biblical Literature and a member of the board of directors of the Institute for Biblical Research.

== Theology ==
Green adheres to Wesleyan-Arminian theology and is an advocate for the Theological Interpretation of Scripture.

== Publications ==
He has written and edited some fifty-five books. They include Dictionary of Jesus and the Gospels, Dictionary of Scripture and Ethics, and In Search of the Soul: Four Views of the Mind-Body Problem.

He has also written many articles and chapters, both for academic study and for general readership. He is the General Editor of the Wesley Study Bible. He is also the editor of the Journal of Theological Interpretation, and serves on the editorial board of such journals as Science and Theology and Science & Christian Belief. He is the New Testament editor for the Common English Bible.

In July 2025, Green began a newsletter at Joel B. Green on Substack. His newsletter is written for popular audiences and includes in-depth explorations on atonement, the Epistle of James, Luke-Acts, and Theological Interpretation of Scripture.

== Selected works ==
=== Books ===
- Green, Joel B. (1995). The Theology of the Gospel of Luke. New Testament theology. Cambridge & New York: Cambridge University Press. ISBN 9780521465298. OCLC 30736535.
- ——— (1997). The Gospel of Luke. New International Commentary on the New Testament. Grand Rapids, MI: Eerdmans.
- ———; Baker, Mark D. (2000). Recovering the scandal of the cross : atonement in New Testament & contemporary contexts. Downers Grove, IL: InterVarsity Press. ISBN 9780830815715. OCLC 44066966.
- ———; Achtemeier, Paul J.; Thompson, Marianne Meye (2001). Introducing the New Testament: its literature and theology. Grand Rapids, MI: Eerdmans. ISBN 9780802837172. OCLC 46359313.
- ——— (2010). Reading Scripture as Wesleyans. Nashville, TN: Abingdon Press. ISBN 9781426719912. OCLC 893092626.
- ——— (2021). Discovering Luke: Content, Interpretation, Reception. Grand Rapids, MI: Eerdmans. ISBN 9780802874962. OCLC 1081383307.

=== Edited by ===
- ———; McKnight, Scot; Marshall, I. Howard, eds. (1992). Dictionary of Jesus and the Gospels. IVP Bible Dictionary series. Vol. 6. Downers Grove, IL: InterVarsity Press. ISBN 9780830817771. OCLC 24538732.
- ———; Lapsley, Jacqueline E.; Miles, Rebekah; Verhey, Allen, eds. (2011). Dictionary of Scripture and Ethics. Grand Rapids, MI: Baker Academic. ISBN 9780801034060. OCLC 699760303.
- ———; McDonald, Lee Martin, eds. (2013). The World of the New Testament : Cultural, Social, and Historical Contexts. Grand Rapids, MI: Baker Academic. ISBN 9780801039621. OCLC 795759475.
- ———; Howe, Bonnie, eds. (2014). Cognitive Linguistic Explorations in Biblical Studies. Berlin & München & Boston: De Gruyter, 2014. ISBN 9783110349788. OCLC 887857698.
