= Leon Morris =

Australian New Testament scholar

The Reverend Leon Morris
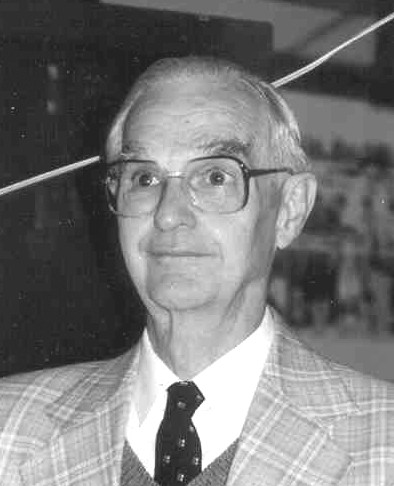
- Born: 15 March 1914; Lithgow, New South Wales
- Died: 24 July 2006 (aged 92); Kew, Melbourne, Australia
- Occupations: New Testament scholar and commentator

Academic background
- Education: University of London; University of Cambridge

Academic work
- Discipline: Biblical studies
- Sub-discipline: New Testament studies
- Institutions: Tyndale House, Cambridge; Ridley College

Leon Lamb Morris (15 March 1914 – 24 July 2006) was an Australian New Testament scholar and theologian.

Born in Lithgow, New South Wales, Morris was ordained to the Anglican ministry in 1938. He earned Bachelor of Divinity (with first class honors) in 1943 and Master of Theology, both from University of London external system. He later received his PhD at the University of Cambridge in England on the subject which became his first major book, The Apostolic Preaching of the Cross. He served as warden of Tyndale House, Cambridge (1960–64); principal of Ridley College in Melbourne (1964–1979), Australia (where they have named a library in his honour); and Visiting Professor of New Testament at Trinity Evangelical Divinity School.

He published several theological works and commentaries on the Bible, notable among which are The Apostolic Preaching of the Cross, The Atonement: Its Meaning and Significance, New Testament Theology, and The Gospel According to John (part of the New International Commentary on the New Testament series), The Gospel According to Matthew (IVP / Eerdmans, 1992), The Epistle to the Romans (IVP / Eerdmans, 1988), and The Book of Revelation: An Introduction and Commentary (Rev. ed., IVP / Eerdmans, 1987).

In 1974, a festschrift was published in his honour. Reconciliation and Hope: New Testament essays presented to L. L. Morris included contributions from John Painter, E. Earle Ellis, Herman N. Ridderbos, Günther Bornkamm, Ralph P. Martin, James D. G. Dunn, Richard N. Longenecker, D. W. B. Robinson, G. R. Beasley-Murray and George Eldon Ladd.

== Selected works ==
=== Books ===
- Morris, Leon (1955). The Apostolic Preaching of the Cross. Grand Rapids, MI: Eerdmans. OCLC 1546602.
- ——— (1956). The Epistles of Paul to the Thessalonians: an introduction and commentary. New International Commentary on the New Testament. Grand Rapids, MI: Eerdmans. ISBN 978-0-802-82187-4. OCLC 690992.
- ——— (1958). The First Epistle of Paul to the Corinthians: an introduction and commentary. Tyndale New Testament Commentaries. Vol. 7. Grand Rapids, MI: Eerdmans. ISBN 978-0-802-81406-7. OCLC 5029950.
- ——— (1959). The First and Second Epistles to the Thessalonians: the English text with introduction, exposition, and notes. Grand Rapids, MI: Eerdmans. ISBN 978-0-851-11882-6. OCLC 10912433.
- ——— (1965). The Cross in the New Testament. Grand Rapids, MI: Eerdmans. ISBN 978-0-802-83199-6. OCLC 384566.
- ———; Cundall, Arthur E. (1968). Judges and Ruth: An Introduction and Survey. Tyndale Old Testament Commentaries. Vol. 7. Downers Grove, IL: Intervarsity Press. ISBN 978-0-877-84896-7.
- ——— (1969). Studies in the fourth Gospel. Grand Rapids, MI: Eerdmans. OCLC 21321.
- ——— (1969). Revelation: an introduction and commentary. Tyndale New Testament Commentaries. Vol. 20. Grand Rapids, MI: Eerdmans. ISBN 978-0-851-11889-5. OCLC 14932834.
- ——— (1971). The Gospel according to John: the English text with introduction, exposition and notes. New International Commentary on the New Testament. Grand Rapids, MI: Eerdmans. ISBN 978-0-802-82296-3. OCLC 200933.
- ——— (1972). Apocalyptic. Grand Rapids, MI: Eerdmans. ISBN 978-0-802-81455-5. OCLC 402448.
- ——— (1974). Luke: an introduction and commentary. Tyndale New Testament Commentaries. Vol. 3. Grand Rapids, MI: Eerdmans. ISBN 978-0-802-82253-6. OCLC 1051946.
- ——— (1976). I Believe in Revelation. I Believe... Grand Rapids, MI: Eerdmans. ISBN 978-0-802-81637-5. OCLC 1991295.
- ——— (1981). Testaments of Love: a study of love in the Bible. Grand Rapids, MI: Eerdmans. ISBN 978-0-802-81874-4. OCLC 7277296.
- ——— (1985). New Testament Theology. Grand Rapids, MI: Academie Books. ISBN 978-0-310-45570-7. OCLC 12976111.
- ——— (1987). The Epistle to the Romans. PNTC. Grand Rapids, MI: Eerdmans. ISBN 978-0-802-83636-6. OCLC 16901277.
- ——— (1989). Jesus is the Christ: Studies in the Theology of John. Grand Rapids, MI: Eerdmans. ISBN 978-0-802-80452-5. OCLC 19267493.
- ———; Carson, D. A.; Moo, Douglas J. (1991). An Introduction to the New Testament. Grand Rapids, MI: Zondervan. ISBN 978-0-310-51940-9. OCLC 24218222.
- ——— (1992). The Gospel according to Matthew. PNTC. Grand Rapids, MI: Eerdmans. ISBN 978-0-802-83696-0. OCLC 25787283.
- ——— (1996). Galatians Paul's Charter of Christian Freedom. Downers Grove, IL: Intervarsity Press. ISBN 978-0-8308-1420-6.

=== Articles ===
- ——— (January 1952). "Justification by Faith: The Old Testament and Rabbinic Anticipation". Evangelical Quarterly. 24 (1): 24–36.
- ——— (October 1952). "The Biblical Use of the Term 'Blood'". Journal of Theological Studies. New Series. 3 (2): 216–227. doi:10.1093/jts/III.2.216.
- ——— (September 1952). "The Biblical Idea of Atonement". Australian Biblical Review. 2 (3–4): 83–95.
- ——— (October 1952). "The Idea of Redemption in the Old Testament". Reformed Theological Review. 11: 94–102.
- ——— (1955). "The Passover in Biblical Literature". Australian Biblical Review. 4: 59–76. covers 1954/55

== Bibliography ==
- Bach, Neil (2016). Leon Morris. Milton Keynes, Bucks: Authentic Media. ISBN 978-1-8422-7986-1.
