= Douglas J. Moo =

American New Testament scholar (born 1950)

- Born: March 15, 1950 (age 76); La Porte, Indiana
- Title: Blanchard Professor of New Testament

Academic background
- Education: University of St. Andrews (PhD)

Academic work
- Discipline: Biblical studies
- Sub-discipline: NT studies
- Institutions: Trinity Evangelical Divinity School; Wheaton College Graduate School
- Notable works: An Introduction to the New Testament (2004) and A Commentary on the Epistle to the Romans (NICNT, 1996, 2018)

Douglas J. Moo (born March 15, 1950) is a Calvinistic New Testament scholar. He taught for 23 years at Trinity Evangelical Divinity School in Illinois, served as Blanchard Professor of New Testament at the Wheaton College Graduate School from 2000 until his retirement in 2023. He received his Ph.D. at the University of St. Andrews, in St. Andrews, Scotland.

Moo has published several theological works and commentaries on the Bible; notable among them are An Introduction to the New Testament (with D.A. Carson and Leon Morris) and The Epistle to the Romans (part of the New International Commentary on the New Testament series). His current research interests are Romans, Pauline theology (and exegesis) and environmental theology. He has been a member of the translation committee that produced the NIV and TNIV since 1996. He was the chair in 2014. He previously edited Trinity Journal.

In 2014, a Festschrift was published in his honour. Studies in the Pauline Epistles: Essays in Honor of Douglas J. Moo included contributions from G. K. Beale, Craig Blomberg, James Dunn, Grant R. Osborne, Thomas R. Schreiner, and N. T. Wright.

He is married to Jenny and they have five children.

== Works ==
=== Books ===
- Moo, Douglas J. (1985). The Epistle of James. Tyndale New Testament Commentary. Leicester; Grand Rapids, MI: IVP; Eerdmans. ISBN 978-0-8028-0079-4.
- ——— (1991). Romans 1–8. Wycliffe Exegetical Commentary. Chicago, IL: Moody Press. ISBN 978-0-8024-9263-0.
- ———; Carson, D. A.; Morris, Leon (1992). An Introduction to the New Testament. New Testament Studies (1st ed.). Grand Rapids, MI: Zondervan. ISBN 978-0-310-51940-9. OCLC 24218222.
- ——— (1996). The Epistle to the Romans. NICNT (1st ed.). Grand Rapids, MI: Eerdmans. ISBN 978-0-8028-2317-5. OCLC 34933859.
- ——— (1996). 2 Peter, Jude. NIV Application Commentary (NIVAC). Grand Rapids, MI: Zondervan. ISBN 978-0-310-20104-5.
- ——— (1997). The Gospel and contemporary perspectives. Kregel. ISBN 978-0-8254-3349-8.
- ——— (2000). The Letter of James. Pillar New Testament Commentary (1st ed.). Grand Rapids, MI: Eerdmans. ISBN 978-0-8028-3730-1.
- ——— (2000). Romans. NIV Application Commentary (NIVAC). Grand Rapids, MI: Zondervan. ISBN 978-0-31049400-3.
- ——— (2002). Encountering the Book of Romans: A Theological Survey. Grand Rapids, MI: Baker. ISBN 978-0-8010-2546-4.
- ——— (2008). The Letters to the Colossians and to Philemon. Pillar New Testament Commentary. Grand Rapids, MI: Zondervan. ISBN 978-0-8028-3727-1.
- ——— (2008). The Old Testament in the Gospel Passion Narratives. Eugene, OR: Wipf & Stock. ISBN 978-1-55635-757-2.
- ———; Carson, D. A. (2004). Introduction to the New Testament (2nd rev. ed.). Grand Rapids, MI: Zondervan. ISBN 978-0-310-23859-1. OCLC 694971820.
- ——— (2013). Galatians. Baker Exegetical Commentary on the New Testament. Grand Rapids, MI: Baker Academic. ISBN 978-0-8010-2754-3.
- ——— (2018). Creation Care: A Biblical Theology of the Natural World. Biblical Theology for Life series. Grand Rapids, MI: Zondervan. ISBN 978-0-31029374-3.
- ——— (2018). The Epistle to the Romans. NICNT (2nd ed.). Grand Rapids, MI: Eerdmans. ISBN 978-0-8028-7121-3.
- ——— (2021). The Letter of James. Pillar New Testament Commentary (2nd ed.). Grand Rapids, MI: Eerdmans. ISBN 978-0-8028-7666-9.

=== Edited by ===
- Moo, Douglas J., ed. (1997). The gospel and contemporary perspectives. Biblical forum series. Vol. 2. Grand Rapids, MI: Kregel Publications. ISBN 978-0-82543349-8. OCLC 35796452.

=== Articles ===
- Moo, Douglas J. (Spring 1980). "1 Timothy 2:11–15: Meaning And Significance". Trinity Journal. 1 (1): 62–83.
- ——— (Spring 1981). "'Gospel origins': a reply to J W Wenham". Trinity Journal. 2 (1): 24–36.
- ——— (Fall 1981). "The interpretation of 1 Timothy 2:11–15: a rejoinder". Trinity Journal. 2 (2): 198–222.
- ——— (Fall 1982). "Romans 6:1–14". Trinity Journal. 3 (2): 215–20.
- ——— (Fall 1988). "Divine Healing in the Health and Wealth Gospel". Trinity Journal. New Series. 9 (2): 191–209.
- ——— (1991). "What Does It Mean Not to Teach or Have Authority Over Men? 1 Timothy 2:11-15". In Piper, John; Grudem, Wayne (eds.). Recovering Biblical Manhood and Womanhood. Wheaton, Ill.: Crossway. ISBN 0-89107-586-0.

=== Training course ===
- ——— (2015–2016). NT305 New Testament Theology (12 hour course). Logos Mobile Education. Bellingham, WA: Lexham Press.

== Festschrift ==
- Harmon, Matthew S.; Smith, Jay E., eds. (2014). Studies in the Pauline Epistles: Essays in Honor of Douglas J. Moo. Grand Rapids, MI: Zondervan. ISBN 978-0-310-49480-5. OCLC 898163821.

== See also ==
- Biblical hermeneutics
- Biblical studies
