= Darrell L. Bock =

American evangelical New Testament scholar

- Born: December 8, 1953 (age 72); Calgary, Alberta, Canada
- Occupations: Executive Director for Cultural Engagement and Senior Research Professor of New Testament Studies at Dallas Theological Seminary

Academic background
- Education: University of Texas at Austin (BA, 1975); Dallas Theological Seminary (ThM, 1979); University of Aberdeen (PhD, 1983)
- Influences: Harold Hoehner, Howard Marshall, Martin Hengel, Otto Betz.

Academic work
- Discipline: New Testament studies
- Sub-discipline: Lukan scholar
- Institutions: Dallas Theological Seminary
- Main interests: Lukan studies
- Notable works: Luke & Acts in the Baker Exegetical Commentary on the New Testament Series, Cultural Intelligence, Jesus according to Scripture, Jesus: God-Man, Recovering the Real Lost Gospel

Darrell L. Bock (born December 8, 1953) is an American evangelical New Testament scholar. He is executive director of Cultural Engagement at The Hendricks Center and Senior Research Professor of New Testament studies at Dallas Theological Seminary (DTS) in Dallas, Texas, United States. Bock received his PhD from Scotland's University of Aberdeen. His supervisor was I. Howard Marshall. Harold Hoehner was an influence in his NT development, as were Martin Hengel and Otto Betz as he was a Humboldt scholar at Tübingen University over multiple years.

His works include the monograph "Blasphemy and Exaltation" in the collection Judaism and the Final Examination of Jesus, and volumes on Luke in both the Baker Exegetical Commentary on the New Testament and the IVP New Testament Commentary Series. Bock is a past president of the Evangelical Theological Society, and he is a member of the board of trustees of Wheaton College (Illinois). He has served as a corresponding editor for Christianity Today, and he has published articles in the Los Angeles Times and The Dallas Morning News.

Bock is known for his work concerning The Da Vinci Code by Dan Brown. In a response to the theological implications of the novel, Bock wrote Breaking the Da Vinci Code, his best-selling work to date. The book challenges the historicity of various extra-biblical ideas expressed in The Da Vinci Code, most notably the supposed marriage of Jesus to Mary Magdalene. He also has written many pieces for Beliefnet and Christianity Today. Bock also wrote The Missing Gospels, which argues for the existence and legitimate primacy of early Christian orthodoxy over non-canonical gospels and beliefs.

On May 17, 2006, immediately before the film The Da Vinci Code opened, Bock appeared on the TV show Nightline, talking about his book and about the movie. Bock has debated agnostic biblical scholar Bart D. Ehrman on whether certain epistles in the New Testament have been forged.

In 2012, Darrell Bock became the executive director of cultural engagement at the Hendricks Center at DTS. He is a host of The Table, Dallas Theological Seminary's weekly cultural engagement podcast. He mentored Mikel Del Rosario, who served as co-host of The Table and cultural engagement manager at the Hendricks Center.

For several years he has been a Guest Lecturer at the Bible Institute of South Africa's Winter School in Cape Town, as well as at numerous other institutions globally.

== Works ==
=== Books ===
- Bock, Darrell L. (1987). Proclamation from Prophecy and Pattern: Lucan Old Testament Christology. Journal for the Study of the New Testament supplement series. London: T & T Clark. ISBN 978-1-850-75000-0.
- ——— (1990). Jesus According to Scripture: Restoring the Portrait from the Gospels (1st ed.). Grand Rapids, MI: Baker Books. p. 704. ISBN 978-1-585-58388-1.
- ———; Merrill, Eugene H. (1991). A Biblical Theology of the Old Testament. Chicago, IL: Moody Press. p. 446. ISBN 0-8024-0738-2.
- ———; Townsend, Jeffrey L.; Campbell, Donald K. (1992). A Case for Premillennialism: A New Consensus. Chicago, IL: Moody Press. ISBN 0-8024-0899-0.
- ———; Blaising, Craig A. (1992). Dispensationalism, Israel and the Church: The Search for Definition. Grand Rapids, MI: Zondervan. ISBN 0-310-34611-8.
- ———; Blaising, Craig A. (1993). Progressive Dispensationalism. Wheaton, IL: BridgePoint. ISBN 1-56476-138-X.
- ——— (1994). A Biblical Theology of the New Testament. Chicago, IL: Moody Press. p. 487. ISBN 0-8024-0735-8.
- ——— (1994). Luke. Downers Grove, IL: InterVarsity Press. p. 412. ISBN 0-8308-1803-0.
- ——— (1994). Luke, Volume 1 (1:1–9:50). BECNT. Grand Rapids, MI: Baker Academic. ISBN 978-0-801-01053-8.
- ——— (1996). Luke, Volume 2 (9:51–24:53). BECNT. Grand Rapids, MI: Baker Academic. ISBN 978-0-801-01052-1.
- ——— (1996). Luke. NIV Application Commentary. Grand Rapids, MI: Zondervan. p. 640. ISBN 0-310-49330-7.
- ——— (1998). Blasphemy and exaltation in Judaism and the final examination of Jesus : a philological-historical study of the key Jewish themes impacting Mark 14:61-64. Grand Rapids, MI: Baker Academic. p. 302. ISBN 0-8010-2236-3.
- ———; Blaising, Craig A.; Gentry, Kenneth L.; Strimple, Robert B. (1999). Three Views on the Millennium and Beyond. Grand Rapids, MI: Zondervan. ISBN 0-310-20143-8.
- ——— (2001). Can I trust the Bible? : defending the Bible's reliability. Norcross, GA: Ravi Zacharias International Ministries. p. 64. ISBN 1-930107-03-X.
- ——— (2002). Jesus according to Scripture : restoring the portrait from the Gospels. Grand Rapids, MI: Baker Academic. p. 704. ISBN 0-8010-2370-X.
- ——— (2002). Purpose-directed theology : getting our priorities right in evangelical controversies. Downers Grove, IL: InterVarsity Press. p. 114. ISBN 0-8308-2725-0.
- ——— (2002). The Bible knowledge key word study : the Gospels. Colorado Springs, CO: Cook Communications Ministries. p. 302. ISBN 0-7814-3444-0.
- ——— (2002). Studying the historical Jesus : a guide to sources and methods. Grand Rapids, MI: Baker Academic. p. 230. ISBN 0-8010-2451-X.
- ——— (2004). Breaking The Da Vinci code : answers to the questions everyone's asking. Nashville, TN: Nelson Books. p. 208. ISBN 0-7852-6046-3.
- ——— (2005). Jesus in context : background readings for Gospel study. Grand Rapids, MI: Baker Academic. p. 286. ISBN 0-8010-2719-5.
- ———; Fanning, Buist M. (2006). Interpreting the New Testament Text: Introduction to the Art and Science of Exegesis. Wheaton, IL: Crossway Books. ISBN 1433519224.
- ——— (2006). The Missing Gospels: Unearthing the Truth Behind Alternative Christianities. Nashville, TN: Nelson Books. p. 256. ISBN 978-0-7852-1294-2.
- ——— (2007). Acts. BECNT. Grand Rapids, MI: Baker Academic. ISBN 978-0-8010-2668-3.
- ——— (2010). Recovering the Real Lost Gospel: Reclaiming the Gospel as Good News. Nashville, TN: B&H Academic. ISBN 978-0-8054-6465-8.
- ———; Glaser, Mitch (2008). To the Jew First: The Case for Jewish Evangelism in Scripture and History. Grand Rapids, MI: Kregel Academic. ISBN 978-0-8254-3658-1.
- ——— (2012). The Gospel According to Isaiah 53: Encountering the Suffering Servant in Jewish and Christian Theology. Grand Rapids, MI: Kregel Academic. ISBN 978-0-8254-2593-6.
- ——— (2012). A Theology of Luke and Acts: God's Promised Program, Realized for All Nations. Biblical Theology of the New Testament. Grand Rapids, MI: Zondervan. ISBN 978-0-3102-7089-8.
- ——— (2012). Who Is Jesus?: Linking the Historical Jesus with the Christ of Faith. Brentwood, TN: Howard Books. ISBN 978-1-439-19068-5.
- ———; Kostenberger, Andreas J. (2014). Truth in a Culture of Doubt: Engaging Skeptical Challenges to the Bible. Nashville, TN: B&H Academic. ISBN 978-1-4336-8404-3.
- ———; Kostenberger, Andreas J.; Chatraw, Josh (2014). Truth Matters. Nashville, TN: B&H Academic. ISBN 978-1-4336-8226-1.
- ——— (2015). Mark. New Cambridge Bible Commentary. Cambridge: Cambridge University Press. ISBN 978-1-1076-7767-8.
- ——— (2016). How Would Jesus Vote?: Politics, the Bible, and Loving Your Neighbor. Simon & Schuster. ISBN 978-1-4391-9070-8.
- ———; Simpson, Benjamin I. (2016). Jesus the God-Man: The Unity and Diversity of the Gospel Portrayals. Grand Rapids, MI: Baker Academic. ISBN 978-0-801-09778-2. OCLC 1056622121.
- ———; Simpson, Benjamin I. (2016). Jesus According to Scripture: Restoring the Portrait from the Gospels (2nd ed.). Grand Rapids, MI: Baker Academic. ISBN 978-0-801-09808-6.
- ——— (2019). Ephesians: An Introduction and Survey. Vol. 10 (Revised ed.). Downers Grove, IL: IVP Academic. - forthcoming June 2019
- ——— (2020). Cultural Intelligence:Living for God in a Diverse, Pluralistic World. Nashville, TN: B&H Academic. ISBN 978-1-5359-8193-4.

=== Edited by ===
- ———; Webb, Robert L., eds. (2010). Key Events in the Life of the Historical Jesus: a collaborative exploration of context and coherence. Wissenschaftliche Untersuchungen zum Neuen Testament. Vol. 247. Grand Rapids, MI: Eerdmans. ISBN 978-0-802-86613-4. OCLC 635490771.
- ———; Glaser, Mitch, eds. (2014). The People, the Land, and the Future of Israel: Israel and the Jewish People in the Plan of God. Grand Rapids, MI: Kregel Academic. ISBN 978-0-8254-4362-6.

=== Chapters ===
- ——— (1991). "Athenians Who Have Never Heard". In Crockett, William V; Sigountos, James G. (eds.). Through No Fault of Their Own? The Fate of Those Who Have Never Heard. Grand Rapids, MI49516: Baker Book House Company. pp. 117–124. ISBN 0801025621.
- ——— (2004). "Luke". In McKnight, Scot; Osborne, Grant R. (eds.). The Face of New Testament Students. Grand Rapids, MI & Leicester: Baker Book House & Apollos. pp. 349–372. ISBN 0801027071.

=== Articles ===
- ——— (1991). "The Son of Man in Luke 5:24". Bulletin for Biblical Research. 1: 109–121. doi:10.2307/26422210. JSTOR 26422210.
- ——— (1991). "Understanding Luke's Tasks: Carefully Building on Precedent (Luke 1:1-4)". Criswell Theological Review. 5 (2): 183–202.
- ——— (1994). "Current Messianic Activity and OT Davidic Promise: Dispensationalism, Hermeneutics, and NT Fulfillment". Trinity Journal. 15 (1): 55–87.
- ——— (September 1998). "Why I am a Dispensationalist With a Small 'd'". Journal of the Evangelical Theological Society. 41 (3): 383–398.
- ——— (December 2002). "Do gender-sensitive translations distort scripture? not necessarily". Journal of the Evangelical Theological Society. 45 (4): 651–669.

As the Director of Cultural Engagement at the Hendricks Center, Bock co-authored series on cultural engagement topics called "The Table Briefing" with Mikel Del Rosario which appeared in each issue of Bibliotheca Sacra from 2012 to 2022.

=== Film ===
- ———; Lee Strobel; Gary R Habermas; Josh McDowell; Ravi K Zacharias; et al. (2003). Jesus [videorecording]: Fact or Fiction; the Jesus Film Project. San Clemente, California: Distributed by Inspirational Films.
