= Tyndale New Testament Commentaries =

Tyndale New Testament Commentaries (or TNTC) is a series of commentaries in English on the New Testament. It is published by the Inter-Varsity Press.

Constantly being revised since its completion, the series seeks to bridge the gap between brevity and scholarly comment.

== Reviews ==
The Tyndale New Testament Commentaries are designed for the frequently-targeted well-read layperson, but many pastors profit as well. The series is conservative but focuses most attention on explaining the meaning of the text with minimal interaction with the voluminous secondary literature. Originally based on the AV/KJV, with Greek and Hebrew transliterated and explained, the series is being rewritten based on the RSV or NIV (at the individual author's discretion), and space is being assigned more equitably. Several of the volumes of this new edition are, within the constraints of the series, outstanding (e.g., Marshall on Acts).

— D. A. Carson

== Titles ==
- replaced - Tasker, R. V. G. Matthew: An Introduction and Survey. Vol. 1. Downers Grove, IL: IVP Academic. - 285 pages

- France, R. T. Matthew: An Introduction and Survey. Vol. 1. Downers Grove, IL: IVP Academic. - 480 pages
  - replaced - Cole, R. Alan. Mark: An Introduction and Survey. Vol. 2. Downers Grove, IL: IVP Academic. - 347 pages
- Schnabel, Eckhard J. Mark. 2. Downers Grove, IL: IVP Academic, 2017. - 448 pages
- Morris, Leon. Luke: An Introduction and Survey. Vol. 3. Downers Grove, IL: IVP Academic. - 370 pages

- replaced - Tasker, R. V. G. John: An Introduction and Survey. Vol. 4. Downers Grove, IL: IVP Academic. - 237 pages

- Kruse, Colin G. John: An Introduction and Survey. Vol. 4. Downers Grove, IL: IVP Academic. - 389 pages

- replaced - Blaiklock, E. M. (1959). Acts: An Introduction and Survey. Vol. 5. Downers Grove, IL: IVP Academic. ISBN 0802814042. - 197 pages

- Marshall, I. Howard. Acts: An Introduction and Survey. Vol. 5. Downers Grove, IL: IVP Academic. - 448 pages
- Bruce, Frederick Fyvie. Romans: An Introduction and Survey. Vol. 6. Downers Grove, IL: IVP Academic. - 283 pages

- replaced - *Morris, Leon. 1 Corinthians: An Introduction and Survey. Vol. 7. Downers Grove, IL: IVP Academic. - 256 pages

- Schreiner, Thomas R. (2018). 1 Corinthians. Vol. 7. Downers Grove, IL: IVP Academic.

- replaced - Tasker, R. V. G. 2 Corinthians: An Introduction and Survey. Vol. 8. Downers Grove, IL: IVP Academic. - 192 pages

- Kruse, Colin G. 2 Corinthians: An Introduction and Survey. Vol. 8 (Revised ed.). Downers Grove, IL: IVP Academic. - 240 pages
- Cole, R. Alan. Galatians: An Introduction and Survey. Vol. 9. Downers Grove, IL: IVP Academic. - 242 pages

- replaced - Foulkes, Francis. Ephesians: An Introduction and Survey. Vol. 10 (Revised ed.). Downers Grove, IL: IVP Academic. - 192 pages

- Bock, Darrell L. (2019). Ephesians: An Introduction and Survey. Vol. 10 (Revised ed.). Downers Grove, IL: IVP Academic. - 240 pages (forthcoming)
- Martin, Ralph P. Philippians: An Introduction and Survey. Vol. 11. Downers Grove, IL: IVP Academic. - 192 pages

- replaced - Carson, Herbert M. Colossians and Philemon: An Introduction and Survey. Vol. 12. Downers Grove, IL: IVP Academic. - 112 pages

- Wright, N. T. Colossians and Philemon: An Introduction and Survey. Vol. 12. Downers Grove, IL: IVP Academic. - 192 pages
- Morris, Leon (2009). 1 and 2 Thessalonians: An Introduction and Survey. Vol. 13 (Revised ed.). Downers Grove, IL: IVP Academic. ISBN 978-1-844-74340-7. - 160 pages
- Guthrie, Donald. The Pastoral Epistles: An Introduction and Survey. Vol. 14. Downers Grove, IL: IVP Academic. - 240 pages

- replaced - Hewitt, Thomas. Hebrews: An Introduction and Survey. Vol. 15. Downers Grove, IL: IVP Academic. - 217 pages
- replaced - Guthrie, Donald. Hebrews: An Introduction and Survey. Vol. 15. Downers Grove, IL: IVP Academic. - 281 pages

- Peterson, David G. Hebrews: An Introduction and Survey. Vol. 15. Downers Grove, IL: IVP Academic. ISBN 978-0830842995. - 352 pages
- Moo, Douglas J. (2009). James: An Introduction and Survey. Vol. 16 (Revised ed.). Downers Grove, IL: IVP Academic. ISBN 978-1-844-74337-7. - 208 pages

- replaced - Stibbs, Alan M.; Walls, Andrew F. 1 Peter: An Introduction and Survey. Vol. 17. Downers Grove, IL: IVP Academic. - 192 pages

- Grudem, Wayne. 1 Peter: An Introduction and Survey. Vol. 17. Downers Grove, IL: IVP Academic. - 256 pages
- Green, Michael. 2 Peter and Jude: An Introduction and Survey. Vol. 18. Downers Grove, IL: IVP Academic. - 224 pages
- Stott, John R. W. The Letters of John: An Introduction and Survey. Vol. 19. Downers Grove, IL: IVP Academic. - 240 pages
- Morris, Leon. Revelation: An Introduction and Survey. Vol. 20. Downers Grove, IL: IVP Academic. - 256 pages

== See also ==
- Tyndale Old Testament Commentaries
- Exegesis
