= Eckhard J. Schnabel =

- Born: 9 May 1955 (age 71); Bad Cannstatt
- Occupations: Evangelical theologian and professor of the New Testament
- Title: Mary French Rockefeller Distinguished Professor of New Testament
- Spouse: Barbara
- Children: 2

Academic background
- Education: University of Aberdeen
- Thesis: Law and Wisdom from Ben Sira to Paul: A Tradition Historical Inquiry Into the Relation of Law, Wisdom, and Ethics (1983)

Eckhard J. Schnabel (born May 9, 1955 in Bad Cannstatt) is a German evangelical theologian and professor of the New Testament. He is the author of numerous scholarly books, Bible commentaries, specialist articles and lexical contributions.

== Biography ==
After graduating from the Friedrich-Schiller Gymnasium Marbach in Marbach am Neckar, Germany, Schnabel studied from 1974 at the State Independent Theological University of Basel in Basel, Switzerland. In 1979 he produced his work on the Holy Scripture and its emergence as a problem of the Protestant Church: An investigation on the understanding of writing and inspiration of Protestant theology and church . Schnabel graduated as Master of Theology . In 1983 he received his doctorate in law from the University of Aberdeen with his PhD in Law and Wisdom from Ben Sira to Paul: A Tradition Historical Inquiry Into the Relation of Law, Wisdom, and Ethics.

Between 1985 and 1988, Schnabel was a New Testament Lecturer, first at the Asian Theological Seminary in Quezon City, Philippines and, in 1987/1988, concurrently, as study director for Biblical Studies at the Asia Graduate School of Theology in Manila . As a lecturer for New Testament he was from 1988 to 1998 at the Giessen School of Theology, between 1989 and 1998 at the (present) Biblisch-Theological Academy Wiedenest in Bergneustadt. From 1998 to 2012 he was a New Testament professor at the Trinity Evangelical Divinity School (TEDS) in Deerfield, IL, near Chicago and from 2012 to 2024 at the Gordon-Conwell Theological Seminary in South Hamilton, Massachusetts (USA) as the Mary F. Rockefeller Distinguished Professor of New Testament Studies.

Schnabel has been a visiting professor at the Evangelical Theological Faculty in Leuven, Belgium (1983), the Providence University College and Theological Seminary, Otterburne, Manitoba (2006, 2008, 2014), the Colombo Theological Seminary, Colombo, Sri Lanka (since 2007), the Shalom University, Bunia, Democratic Republic of Congo (2013, 2016), the Phoenix Seminary Arizona, USA (2014, 2019), the Logos Evangelical Seminary Los Angeles, USA (2016, 2020), the Facultad de Teología Integral Buenos Aires, Argentina (since 2022), and the Seminario Teológico Alianza Temuco, Chile (2026). He has been involved in pastoral courses at Timothy Training International, Hong Kong, China.

Schnabel is a member of the Society of New Testament Studies, the Tyndale Fellowship, the Evangelical Theological Society, the Institute for Biblical Research, the Society of Biblical Literature, and the Arbeitskreis für evangelikale Theologie. He was book review editor at Trinity Journal (2000-2010) and associate editor of the Bulletin of Biblical Research (2004-2020). He is co-editor of the New Testament commentary series Historisch-Theologische Auslegung des Neuen Testaments (SCM R. Brockhaus) since 1995, and editor of the Tyndale New Testament Commentary since 2012.

He was involved in missionary work with Operation Mobilization in Latin America and Europe between 1979 and 1981, and with the Overseas Missionary Fellowship from 1984 to 1988 in Manila, Philippines. He has been involved in preaching and teaching at the Gilcomston Park Baptist Church, Aberdeen, Scotland (1981-1983), the Village Church of Gurnee (1998-2012), and the First Congregational Church of Hamilton, Massachusetts (since 2012).

In addition to German and English, he is fluent in six ancient languages and four other languages that he uses for research purposes.

== Degrees ==
- 1974 - Abitur (Friedrich-Schiller-Gymnasium Marbach)
- 1979 - Lic. Theol (Th.M) (Staatsunabhängige Theologische Hochschule Basel)
- 1983 - Ph.D. (University of Aberdeen)

== Awards ==
Schnabel was awarded the 2003 Johann Tobias Beck Prize for Early Christian Mission, a 1,800-page book that, according to the convicting body, represents a significant contribution to theology from an evangelical perspective. As a comprehensive compendium of New Testament history and theology, it would probably become the standard work on the subject of "Mission in the New Testament" for years, according to its laudator Heinz-Werner Neudorfer .

== Personal ==
Eckhard J. Schnabel is married to Barbara. The couple have two children.

=== Books ===
- Schnabel, Eckhard J. (1985). Law and Wisdom from Ben Sira to Paul: a tradition historical enquiry into the relation of law, wisdom, and ethics. Tübingen: Mohr Siebeck. ISBN 978-3-16-144896-6.
- ——— (1986). Inspiration und Offenbarung : die Lehre vom Ursprung und Wesen der Bibel (in trans. Inspiration and Revelation: The Doctrine of the Origin and Nature of the Bible. Theologische Verlagsgemeinschaft. Wuppertal: SCM & R. Brockhaus. ISBN 9783417295191. OCLC 18091141.
- ——— (1993). Das Reich Gottes als Wirklichkeit und Hoffnung : neuere Entwicklungen in der evangelikalen Theologie (in trans. The kingdom of God as reality and hope. Recent Developments in Evangelical Theology). TVG--Orientierung. Wuppertal: R. Brockhaus. ISBN 9783417295405. OCLC 29609264.
- ——— (1995). Sind Evangelikale Fundamentalisten? (in trans. Are Evangelicals Fundamentalists?). TVG--Orientierung. Wuppertal: R. Brockhaus. ISBN 9783417290677. OCLC 32936983.
- ——— (2002). Urchristliche Mission (in trans. Original Christian Mission). Wuppertal: SCM & R. Brockhaus. ISBN 9783417294750. OCLC 56880425.
- ——— (2004). Early Christian Mission: Jesus and the Twelve - Paul and the Early Church (2 volumes). Downers Grove, IL: IVP Academic. ISBN 9780830827909. OCLC 56085703.
- ——— (2006). Paul's First Letter to the Corinthians. Historisch Theologische Auslegung, Neues Testament. Vol. 4. Wuppertal: SCM & R. Brockhaus. ISBN 9783417297249. OCLC 71816727.
- ——— (2008). Paul the Missionary: Realities, Strategies and Methods. Downers Grove, IL: IVP Academic. ISBN 9780830828876. OCLC 231162262.
- ——— (2011). 40 Questions about the End Times. 40 questions series. Grand Rapids, MI: Kregel Academic & Professional. ISBN 9780825438967. OCLC 745979891.
- ——— (2011). Acts. Zondervan Exegetical Commentary on the New Testament. Vol. 5. Grand Rapids, MI: Zondervan. ISBN 9780310243670. OCLC 773371794.
- ——— (2013). Das Neue Testament und die Endzeit (in trans. The New Testament and the End Times). Giessen; Basel: Brunnen-Verlag. ISBN 9783765590160. OCLC 864670248.
- ——— (2015). Der Brief des Paulus an die Römer, Kapitel 1-5 (in trans. The Letter of Paul to the Romans: Volume=1: Chapters 1-5). Historical Theological Interpretation (HTA). Wuppertal: SCM & R. Brockhaus. ISBN 9783417297317. OCLC 908257931.
- ——— (2016). Der Brief des Paulus an die Römer, Kapitel 6-16 (in trans. The Letter of Paul to the Romans. Volume 2: Chapters 6-16). Historical Theological Interpretation (HTA). Wuppertal: SCM & R. Brockhaus. ISBN 9783417297355. OCLC 948695988.
- ——— (2017). Mark: an introduction and commentary. Tyndale New Testament Commentaries. Downers Grove, IL: IVP Academic. ISBN 978-0-8308-4292-6.
- ——— (2018). Jesus in Jerusalem: The Last Days. Grand Rapids, MI: Eerdmans. ISBN 9780802875808.
- ——— (2018). Jesus, Paul, and the Early Church: Missionary Realities in Historical Contexts. Collected Essays. WUNT 406. Tübingen: Mohr Siebeck. ISBN 9783161560613.
- ——— (2023). New Testament Theology. Grand Rapids, MI: Baker. ISBN 9781540963116.
- ——— (2026). The Worship of Dea Roma, the Emperors, and the World of John's Revelation. Grand Rapids, MI: Baker. ISBN 9781540963116.

To be published: Revelation. Evangelical Biblical Theology Commentary (to be published) Forgiveness: A Biblical-Theological Study. (to be published)

as co-author

- with Heinz-Werner Neudorfer : The Study of the New Testament, Vol. 1, An Introduction to the Methods of Exegesis, SCM R. Brockhaus, Witten 1999, ISBN 978-3-417-29434-7 .
- with Heinz-Werner Neudorfer: The Study of the New Testament, Vol. 2, Special Problems, Exegetical and hermeneutic basic questions, SCM R. Brockhaus, Witten 2000, ISBN 978-3-7655-9462-5 .
- with Stanley E. Porter: On the Writing of New Testament Commentaries, Brill Leiden 2012, ISBN 978-9-00423291-4 .
- with David W. Chapman: The trial and crucifixion of Jesus: texts and commentary, Mohr Siebeck, Tübingen 2015, ISBN 978-3-16-151674-0 .
- with Gordon Isaac" Reformation Celebration: Implications of Martin Luther’s Theology and Actions for the Life and Ministry of the Church Today. Hendrickson, 2018
- with D. J. Moo, E. J. Schnabel, T. R. Schreiner, and F. Thielman: Paul’s Letter to the Romans: Theological Essays, Hendrickson, 2023

=== Articles ===
- ——— (1995). "History, Theology and the Biblical Canon: an Introduction to Basic Issues". Themelios. 20 (2): 16–24.
- ——— (2002). "John and the Future of the Nations". Bulletin for Biblical Research. 12 (2): 243–271. doi:10.2307/26422287. JSTOR 26422287.
- ——— (March 2002). "Israel, the people of God, and the nations". Journal of the Evangelical Theological Society. 45 (1): 35–57.
- ——— (Fall 2005). "The Objectives of Change, Factors of Transformation, and the Causes of Results: The Evidence of Paul's Corinthians Correspondence". Trinity Journal. New Series. 26 (2): 179–204.
- ——— (2008). "Jewish Opposition to Christians in Asia Minor in the First Century". Bulletin for Biblical Research. 18 (2): 233–270. doi:10.2307/26423845. JSTOR 26423845.
- ——— (June 2011). "Fads And Common Sense: Reading Acts in the First Century and Reading Acts Today". Journal of the Evangelical Theological Society. 54 (2): 251–278.

2011 “The Meaning of βαπτίζειν in Greek, Jewish, and Patristic Literature.” Filologia Neotestamentaria 24 (2011) 3–40 (published April 2013)

2014 “The Muratorian Fragment: The State of Research.” Journal of the Evangelical Theological Society 57 (2014) 231–264

2015 “Repentance in Paul’s Letters.” Novum Testamentum 57 (2015) 159–186

2016 “On Historiography: A Review Article of Craig S. Keener, Acts: An Exegetical Commentary. 4 vols. Grand Rapids: Baker, 2012–2015.” Trinity Journal 37 (2016) 57–67

2017 “Knowing the Divine and Divine Knowledge in Greco-Roman Religion.” Tyndale Bulletin 68 (2017) 287–312

2018 “The Persecution of Christians in the First Century.” Journal of the Evangelical Theological Society 61 (2018): 525–47

2019 “Biblical Theology from a New Testament Perspective.” Journal of the Evangelical Theological Society 62 (2019): 225–249

2020 “Jesus’ Parables as Target of Source, Form, Redaction, and Memory Critics: Blind Spots, Failures, and Scholarly Integrity.” Presbyterion 46 (2020) 45–58

2021 “The Viability of Premillennialism and the Text of Revelation.” Journal of the Evangelical Theological Society 64 (2021) 785–795

2022 “Ἰησοῦσ Χριστόσ, Jesus Messiah.” Tyndale Bulletin 73 (2022) 1–21

=== Chapters ===
- ——— (2004). "Textual Criticism: Recent Developments". In McKnight, Scot; Osborne, Grant R. (eds.). The Face of New Testament Students. Grand Rapids, MI & Leicester: Baker Book House & Apollos. pp. 59–75. ISBN 0801027071.

2011 “Irreconcilable Views of Salvation according to Early Christianity and Judaism.” In Jesus, Salvation and the Jewish People. Papers on the Uniqueness of Jesus and Jewish Evangelism Presented at a Conference Conducted by the World Evangelical Alliance Theological Commission 18–22 August 2008, Woltersdorf, Berlin, Germany. Edited by D. Parker. Milton Keynes: Paternoster, 2011, 39–68

2011 “Karl Barth, Mark Kinzer, and the Jewish People, with Implications for Jewish Missions.” In Jesus, Salvation and the Jewish People. Papers on the Uniqueness of Jesus and Jewish Evangelism Presented at a Conference Conducted by the World Evangelical Alliance Theological Commission 18–22 August 2008, Woltersdorf, Berlin, Germany. Edited by D. Parker. Milton Keynes: Paternoster, 2011, 248–72

2011 “The Language of Baptism: The Meaning of βαπτίζω in the New Testament.” In Understanding the Times: New Testament Studies in the 21st Century. FS D. A. Carson. Edited by A. J. Köstenberger and R. W. Yarbrough. Wheaton: Crossway, 2011, 217–246

2011 “Singing and Instrumental Music in the Early Church.” In Sprache lieben – Gottes Wort verstehen. Beiträge zur biblischen Exegese. FS H. von Siebenthal. Edited by W. Hilbrands. Giessen: Brunnen, 309–341

2011 “Global Strategies and Local Methods of Missionary Work in the early Church: Jesus, Peter, and Paul.” In The Church Going Global: Mission and Globalization. Edited by T. Engelsviken, E. Lundeby, and D. Solheim. Proceedings of the Fjellhaug Symposium 2010. Oxford: Regnum, 2011, 30–46

2011 “Early Christian Mission and Christian Identity in the Context of the Ethnic, Social, and Political Affiliations in Revelation.” New Testament Theology in Light of the Church’s Mission. FS I. H. Marshall. Edited by Jon C. Laansma, Ray Van Neste and Grant R. Osborne. Milton Keynes/Eugene, OR: Paternoster, Cascade, 2011, 369–386

2012 “Paul, Timothy, and Titus: The Assumption of a Pseudonymous Author and of Pseudonymous Recipients in the Light of Literary, Theological, and Historical Evidence.” Do Historical Matters Matter to Faith? A Critical Appraisal of Modern and Postmodern Approaches to Scripture. Edited by J. K. Hoffmeier and D. R. Magary. Wheaton: Crossway, 2012, 383–403

2012 “The Community of the Followers of Jesus in 1 Corinthians.” In The New Testament Church: The Challenge of Developing Ecclesiologies. McMaster Biblical Studies Series. Ed. John P. Harrison and James D. Dvorak. Eugene: Pickwick, 2012, 103–129

2012 with Stanley E. Porter, “Foreword.” In On the Writing of New Testament Commentaries. Edited by Stanley E. Porter and Eckhard J. Schnabel. Texts and Editions for New Testament Study 8. Leiden: Brill, 2012, xi–xviii

2012 “On Commentary Writing.” In On the Writing of New Testament Commentaries. Edited by Stanley E. Porter and Eckhard J. Schnabel. Texts and Editions for New Testament Study 8. Leiden: Brill, 2012, 1–31

2012 “Timothy: Missionary, Pastor, and Theologian.” Videre med evangeliet. FS Egil Grandhagen. Edited by H. A. Gravaas, E. Kjebekk T. E. Hamre, and A. Redse. Oslo: Akademika, 2012, 69–93

2012 “Paul the Missionary.” in Paul’s Missionary Methods: In His Time and Ours. Edited by R. L. Plummer and J. M. Terry. Downers Grove: IVP Academic, 2012, 29–43

2015 “Persecution in the Early Christian Mission according to the Book of Acts.” Rejection: God’s Refugees in Biblical and Contemporary Perspective. Edited by S. E. Porter. Eugene: Pickwick, 2015, 141–180

2015 “Missions in the Apostolic Church.” Missiology: An Introduction to the Foundations, History, and Strategies of World Missions. Second Edition. Edited by John M. Terry. Nashville: B & H Academic 2015, 69–85

2016 “Evangelism and the Mission of the Church.” God and the Faithfulness of Paul: A Critical Examination of the Pauline Theology of N.T. Wright. Edited by C. Heilig, J. T. Hewett, and M. F. Bird. WUNT 2.413. Tübingen: Mohr Siebeck, 2016, 683–707

2016 “Introducing Foreign Deities: The Documentary Evidence.” The Language and Literature of the New Testament. FS S. E. Porter. Edited by L. K. Dow, C. A. Evans and A. W. Pitts. Leiden: Brill, 2016, 482–520

2017 “Christians, Jews, and Pagans in the Book of Revelation: Persecution, Perseverance, and Purity in the Shadow of the Last Judgment.” Interreligious Relations: Biblical Perspectives. Proceedings from the Second Norwegian Summer Academy of Biblical Studies, Ansgar University College, Kristiansand, Norway, August 2015. Edited by H. Hagelia and M. Zehnder. London: Bloomsbury T&T Clark, 2017, 201–231

2018 “Lives that Speak: ἡ λογικὴ λατρεία in Romans 12.1.” In The Earliest Perceptions of Jesus in Context. FS J. Nolland. Edited by A. W. White, D. Wenham, C. A. Evans. LNTS 566. Bloomsbury T&T Clark 2018, 280–296

2018 “Sola gratia: The Foundational Significance of Grace in Luther’s Early Theology.” In Reformation Celebration: Implications of Martin Luther’s Theology and Actions for the Life and Ministry of the Church Today. Edited by Gordon Isaac and Eckhard J. Schnabel. Peabody: Hendrickson, 2018, 12–28, 231–235

2018 “The Centrality of Jesus Christ in Paul’s Ethics.” In Reformation Celebration: Implications of Martin Luther’s Theology and Actions for the Life and Ministry of the Church Today. Edited by Gordon Isaac and Eckhard J. Schnabel. Peabody: Hendrickson, 2018, 191 207, 257–259

2018 “The Vision and Practice of the Missionary Work of Jesus, John, and Paul: 36 Theses.” In Bible, Mission, and Theology. FS Simon Samuel. Edited by P. V. Joseph. Indian Society for Promoting Christian Knowledge/Luther W. New Theological College: Delhi/Dehradun, 2018, 14–35

2019 “Jesus’s Atoning Sacrifice in Hebrews and Atonement of Sin in the Roman World.” In So Great a Salvation: A Dialogue on the Atonement in Hebrews. Edited by John C. Laansma, George H. Guthrie, and Cynthia Long Westfall. Library of New Testament Studies 516. London: T&T Clark, 2019, 65–86

2019 “The Topography of Jerusalem in the Book of Acts.” In Lexham Geographic Commentary: Acts through Revelation. Edited by B. Beitzel. Bellingham: Lexham, 2019, 19–41

2019 “Jesus’ Missionary Commission and the Ends of the Earth.” In Lexham Geographic Commentary: Acts through Revelation. Edited by B. Beitzel. Bellingham: Lexham, 2019, 51–67

2019 “The Persecution of the Earliest Christians in Geographical Perspective.” In Lexham Geographic Commentary: Acts through Revelation. Edited by B. Beitzel. Bellingham: Lexham, 2019, 142–155

2019 “Paul’s Missionary Work in Syria, Nabatea, Judea, and Cilicia.” In Lexham Geographic Commentary: Acts through Revelation. Edited by B. Beitzel. Bellingham: Lexham, 2019, 229–236

2019 “Paul’s Missionary Work in Cyprus, Galatia, and Pamphylia.” In Lexham Geographic Commentary: Acts through Revelation. Edited by B. Beitzel. Bellingham: Lexham, 2019, 298–310

2019 “Paul’s Missionary Work in Macedonia and Achaia.” In Lexham Geographic Commentary: Acts through Revelation. Edited by B. Beitzel. Bellingham: Lexham, 2019, 332–343

2019 “Paul’s Missionary Work in the Provinces of Asia and Illyria.” In Lexham Geographic Commentary: Acts through Revelation. Edited by B. Beitzel. Bellingham: Lexham, 2019, 385–398

2019 “Paul as a Prisoner in Judea and Rome.” In Lexham Geographic Commentary: Acts through Revelation. Edited by B. Beitzel. Bellingham: Lexham, 2019, 398–410

2019 “Paul in Spain and Crete.” In Lexham Geographic Commentary: Acts through Revelation. Edited by B. Beitzel. Bellingham: Lexham, 2019, 450–454

2019 “Paul the Missionary: Preaching to Everyone, Everywhere.” Journeys of the Apostle Paul. Edited by D. Bomar. Bellingham: Lexham, 2019, 46–49

2021 “Son of Man in the Gospel of Mark.” A Handbook on the Jewish Roots of the Gospels. Edited by Craig A. Evans and David Mishkin. Peabody: Hendrickson, 2021, 190–203

2022 “Paul the Missionary.” In The Oxford Handbook of Pauline Studies. Edited by M. Novenson and R. B. Matlock. Oxford: Oxford University Press, 2022, 54–70

2023 “Jesus Messiah and the New Life of True Righteousness (Romans 6).” In Paul’s Letter to the Romans: Theological Essays. Edited by D. J. Moo, E. J. Schnabel, T. R. Schreiner, and F. Thielman. Peabody: Hendrickson, 2023, 173–198

2025 “Apostolic Texts as Scripture in the Second Century: Their Significance and Authority.” In Second-Century Christianity: A Sourcebook. Edited by Mike Bird and Scott Harrower. Waco: Baylor University Press, 2025, 465–523

2025 “God’s Presence and the Absence of Tears (Rev. 7:17; 21:4),” in That You May Believe. FS A. J. Köstenberger. Edited by . Q. M. Mosier, T. D. Alexander, and R. W. Yarbrough (Grand Rapids: Kregel, 2025), 255–77.

2026 “Paul’s Letters to the Corinthians and Acts.” Corinth: Early Christian Centers III. Edited by A. C. Heidel and B. Schliesser. Tübingen: Mohr Siebeck, 2026, 175–183

2026 “Values, Norms and Principles of the Behavior of Jesus’s Followers in the Context of a Pandemic.” The Bible and Pandemics: A Multi-Disciplinary Light on the Corona Crisis and Similar Events. Edited by M. Zehnder. Sheffield: Sheffield Phoenix Press, 2026, 138–54
