= Pillar New Testament Commentary =

The Pillar New Testament Commentary (or PNTC) is a series of commentaries in English on the New Testament. It is published by the William B. Eerdmans Publishing Company.

Expanding during the last twenty years and already being revised, this series seems designed for students and pastors. Exegetical opinions are addressed and current academic theories are reviewed making the series serious but not overly technical. The series is conservative evangelical, however its commentators hail from various churchmanship. Currently the series editor is D. A. Carson.

In August 2016, Eerdmans withdrew the two commentaries which Peter O'Brien has contributed to the series (on Ephesians and Hebrews) on account of plagiarism. According to Eerdmans, the commentary on Hebrews in particular ran afoul "of commonly accepted standards with regard to the utilization and documentation of secondary sources."

== Reviews ==
The main focus of the commentaries is exegetical but with a view to aiding expositors. The meaning of each sentence is determined, and then it is shown how it fits in with the overall argument of the section and book

— Mark Heath

== Titles ==
- Morris, Leon (1992). The Gospel according to Matthew. Grand Rapids, MI: Eerdmans. ISBN 978-0-8028-3696-0. Pages 798
- Edwards, James R. (2001). The Gospel according to Mark. Grand Rapids, MI: Eerdmans. ISBN 978-0-8028-3734-9. Pages 578
- Edwards, James R. (2015). The Gospel According to Luke. Grand Rapids, MI: Eerdmans. ISBN 978-0-8028-3735-6. Pages
- Carson, D. A. (1990). The Gospel according to John. Grand Rapids, MI: Eerdmans. ISBN 978-0-8028-3683-0. Pages 715
- Peterson, David G. (2009). The Acts of the Apostles. Grand Rapids, MI: Eerdmans. ISBN 978-0-8028-3731-8. Pages 848
- Kruse, Colin G. (2012). Paul's Letter to the Romans. Grand Rapids, MI: Eerdmans. ISBN 978-0-8028-3743-1. Pages 669
  - replaced Morris, Leon (1988). The Epistle to the Romans. Grand Rapids, MI: Eerdmans. ISBN 978-0-8511-1747-8. Pages 590
- Ciampa, Roy E.; Rosner, Brian S. (2010). The First Letter to the Corinthians. Grand Rapids, MI: Eerdmans. ISBN 978-0-8028-3732-5. Pages 960
- Seifrid, Mark A. (2014). The Second Letter to the Corinthians. Grand Rapids, MI: Eerdmans. ISBN 978-0-8028-3739-4. Pages 569
  - withdrawn O'Brien, Peter T. (1999). The Letter to the Ephesians. Grand Rapids, MI: Eerdmans. ISBN 978-0-8028-3736-3. Pages 569
- Campbell, Constantine R. (2023). The Letter to the Ephesians. Grand Rapids, MI: Eerdmans. ISBN 978-0-8028-7585-3. Pages 358
- Hansen, G. Walter (2009). The Letter to the Philippians. Grand Rapids, MI: Eerdmans. ISBN 978-0-8028-3737-0. Pages 392
- Moo, Douglas J. (2008). The Letters to the Colossians and to Philemon. Grand Rapids, MI: Eerdmans. ISBN 978-0-8028-3727-1. Pages 480
- Green, Gene L. (2002). The Letters to the Thessalonians. Grand Rapids, MI: Eerdmans. ISBN 978-0-8028-3738-7. Pages 440
- Yarbrough, Robert W. (2018). The Letters to Timothy and Titus. Grand Rapids, MI: Eerdmans. ISBN 978-0-8028-3733-2.. Pages 640
  - withdrawn O'Brien, Peter T. (2010). The Letter to the Hebrews. Grand Rapids, MI: Eerdmans. ISBN 978-0-8028-3729-5. Pages 600
- Grindheim, Sigurd (2023). The Letter to the Hebrews. Grand Rapids, MI: Eerdmans. ISBN 978-0-8028-7571-6. Pages 848
- Moo, Douglas J. (2000). The Letter of James. Grand Rapids, MI: Eerdmans. ISBN 978-0-8028-3730-1. Pages 287
- Davids, Peter H. (2006). The Letters of 2 Peter and Jude. Grand Rapids, MI: Eerdmans. ISBN 978-0-8028-3726-4. Pages 348
- Kruse, Colin G. (2000). The Letters of John. Grand Rapids, MI: Eerdmans. ISBN 978-0-8028-3728-8. Pages 277
  - retired Hughes, Philip E. (1990). The Book of the Revelation. Grand Rapids, MI: Eerdmans. ISBN 978-0-8511-1748-5. Pages 272

== See also ==
- New International Commentary on the New Testament
- Exegesis
