= The Missing Gospels =

2006 book by Darrell Bock

The Missing Gospels: Unearthing the Truth Behind Alternative Christianities
- Author: Darrell L. Bock
- Language: English
- Genre: Religion
- Publisher: Thomas Nelson
- Publication date: 2006
- Pages: 256
- ISBN: 0-7852-1294-9
- OCLC: 63178769

The Missing Gospels: Unearthing the Truth Behind Alternative Christianities is a book by Darrell L. Bock, Research Professor of New Testament Studies at Dallas Theological Seminary. The book is concerned with later alternative gospels and 'Christianities' associated with the Nag Hammadi discoveries of 1945. The book focuses on the claims of early Christian diversity, the origins of Gnosticism, as well as the theology of the later alternative texts and communities.

The book contains a foreword by Edwin M. Yamauchi.

== Reception ==
The book contains numerous endorsements by prominent Christian New Testament scholars and academics including Larry Hurtado, Martin Hengel, Donald Hagner, Craig A. Evans, Craig L. Blomberg and Scot McKnight.
