= Emmanuel Chinwokwu =

Nigerian professor of New Testament studies (b. 1948)

Prof Emmanuel Chinwokwu
- Born: Emmanuel Nlenanya Chinwokwu; 22 March 1948 (age 78); Amankwu Ututu
- Occupations: Researcher; Academic; Theologian

Academic background
- Education: Hope Waddell Training Institution; Trinity Union Theological College; University of Nigeria, Nsukka; Princeton Theological Seminary

Emmanuel Nlenanya Chinwokwu (formerly Emmanuel Nlenanya Onwu) is a Nigerian theologian and Professor of New Testament Studies at University of Nigeria, Nsukka. He is a former head of department of Religious studies at the University of Nigeria and an elected Member of Studiorum Novi Testamenti Societas.

== Early life and education ==
Chinwokwu was born On March 22, 1948 at Amankwu Ututu, Ututu, Arochukwu L.G.A., Abia State, Nigeria. He obtained his West African Senior School Certificate from Hope Waddell Training Institution, Calabar in 1966. He proceeded to Trinity Union Theological College, Umuahia where he graduated in 1973. In 1977, he obtained B. A (Hons) from the Department of Religion, University of Nigeria, Nsukka, and was awarded the prize of Best Graduating Student of the Department and Best Final Year Student of the Faculty of Social Sciences, University of Nigeria, Nsukka. In 1979, he earned his Master's of Theology Th.M. certificate from Princeton Theological Seminary, NJ, USA. He then returned to Nigeria and gained employment into the University of Nigeria, Nsukka. In 1981, he began his PhD at the University of Nigeria, and later transferred to the Theology Department of the University of Durham, England where he was supervised by James Dunn and Andrew Chester. He obtained his PhD (Nig/Durham) in 1983.

== Career ==
Chinwokwu started his career in University of Nigeria, Nsukka as an assistant Lecturer in 1980, lecturer II in 1981, promoted to Lecturer I in 1984, Senior Lecturer in 1986 and to Professor in 1988.

Also, he was appointed as a professor in University of Zimbabwe, Harare between 1993 - 1994. He became a visiting scholar and external examiner of the University of Cambridge, England UK and University of Edinburgh in 1995.

Between 2004 - 2005, he was a Sabbatical Professor at Abia State University and also maintained the same position at Ebonyi State University between 2009 – 2010

== Publications ==
- E. N. Onwu. (1991). A Critical Introduction to the Traditions of Jesus
- N. Onwu. (1997). Go And Make Disciples: Rediscovering the Biblical Mandate in Africa.
- Onwu, N. Uzo Ndu Na Eziokwu: Towards An Understanding of Igbo Traditional Religious Life and Philosophy.
- Onwu, N., Basic Issues in the close of New Testament Era.
