= New International Commentary on the New Testament =

New Testament commentary

The New International Commentary on the New Testament (or NICNT) is a series of commentaries in English on the text of the New Testament in Greek. It is published by the William B. Eerdmans Publishing Company. The current series editor is Joel B. Green.

The NICNT covers all 27 books of the New Testament with the exceptions of 2 Peter and Jude.

== Volumes ==
- France, R. T. (2007). The Gospel of Matthew. ISBN 978-0-8028-2501-8. 1233 pages
- Lane, William L. (1974). The Gospel of Mark. ISBN 978-0-8028-2502-5. 678 pages
- Green, Joel B. (1997). The Gospel of Luke. ISBN 978-0-8028-2315-1. 1020 pages
  - Replaced Geldenhuys, Norval (1951). The Gospel of Luke. ISBN 0-8028-2184-7. 685 pages
- Michaels, J. Ramsey (2010). The Gospel of John. ISBN 978-0-8028-2302-1. 1094 pages
  - Replaced Morris, Leon (1971). The Gospel according to John. ISBN 978-0-8028-2504-9. 888 pages
- Bruce, F. F. (1988). The Book of the Acts. ISBN 978-0-8028-2505-6. 564 pages
- Moo, Douglas J. (2018). The Epistle to the Romans (2nd ed.). ISBN 978-0-8028-7121-3. 1184 pages
  - Replaced Moo, Douglas J. (1996). The Epistle to the Romans. ISBN 978-0-8028-2317-5. 1037 pages
    - Replaced Murray, John (1959). The Epistle to the Romans. ISBN 978-0-8028-2506-3. 736 pages
- Fee, Gordon D. (2014). The First Epistle to the Corinthians (2nd ed.). ISBN 0802871364.
  - Replaced Fee, Gordon D. (1987). The First Epistle to the Corinthians. ISBN 978-0-8028-2507-0. 904 pages
    - Replaced Grosheide, F. W. (1953). The First Epistle to the Corinthians. ISBN 0-8028-2185-5. 415 pages
- Barnett, Paul (1997). The Second Epistle to the Corinthians. ISBN 978-0-8028-2300-7. 692 pages
  - Replaced Hughes, Philip E. (1962). The Second Epistle to the Corinthians. ISBN 0-8028-2186-3. 508 pages
- deSilva, David Arthur (2018). The Letter to the Galatians. ISBN 978-0-8028-3055-5. 622 pages
  - Replaced Fung, Ronald Y. K. (1988). The Epistle to the Galatians. ISBN 978-0-8028-2509-4. 375 pages
    - Replaced Ridderbos, Herman Nicolaas (1953). The Epistle of Paul to the Churches of Galatia. ISBN 978-0-8028-6482-6. 240 pages
- Cohick, Lynn H. (2020). The Letter to the Ephesians. ISBN 978-0-8028-6842-8. 521 pages
  - Replaced Bruce, F. F. (1984). The Epistles to the Colossians, to Philemon, and to the Ephesians. ISBN 978-0-8028-2510-0. 470 pages
    - Replaced Simpson, E. K.; Bruce, F. F. (1957). Commentary on the Epistles to the Ephesians and the Colossians. ISBN 978-080282193-5. 328 pages
- Fee, Gordon D. (1995). Paul's Letter to the Philippians. ISBN 978-0-8028-2511-7. 543 pages
  - Replaced Müller, Jac J. (1955). The Epistles of Paul to the Philippians and to Philemon. ISBN 0-8028-2188-X. 200 pages
- McKnight, Scot (2018). The Letter to the Colossians. ISBN 978-0802867988. 522 pages
  - Replaced Bruce, F. F. (1984). The Epistles to the Colossians, to Philemon, and to the Ephesians. ISBN 978-0-8028-2510-0. 470 pages
- McKnight, Scot (2017). The Letter to Philemon. ISBN 978-0802873828. 160 pages
  - Replaced Bruce, F. F. (1984). The Epistles to the Colossians, to Philemon, and to the Ephesians. ISBN 978-0-8028-2510-0. 470 pages
- Fee, Gordon D. (2009). The First and Second Epistles to the Thessalonians. ISBN 978-0-8028-6362-1. 400 pages
  - Replaced Morris, Leon (1991). The First and Second Epistles to the Thessalonians. ISBN 978-0-8028-2512-4. 296 pages
- Towner, Philip H. (2006). The Letters to Timothy and Titus. ISBN 978-0-8028-2513-1. 934 pages
- Cockerill, Gareth Lee (2011). The Epistle to the Hebrews. ISBN 978-0-8028-2492-9. 768 pages
  - Replaced Bruce, F. F. (1997). The Epistle to the Hebrews. ISBN 978-0-8028-2514-8. 448 pages
- McKnight, Scot (2011). The Epistle of James. ISBN 978-0-8028-2627-5. 536 pages
  - Replaced Adamson, James B. (1976). The Epistle of James. ISBN 978-0-8028-2515-5. 227 pages
    - Replaced Alexander, Ross (1954). The Epistles of James and John. 249 pages
- Davids, Peter H. (1990). The First Epistle of Peter. ISBN 978-0-8028-2516-2. 288 pages
- Marshall, I. Howard (1978). The Epistles of John. ISBN 978-0-8028-2518-6. 291 pages
- Mounce, Robert H. (1997). The Book of Revelation. ISBN 978-0-8028-2537-7. 475 pages

== Physical parameters ==
The original hardcover editions published during the 1950s through c. 1991 were characterized by a distinctive dark blue cloth binding with a scarlet field and gold lettering on the spine, and the individual volumes were approximately 5.675 inches (14.41 cm) in width, 8.75 inches (22.2 cm) in height, and of variable thickness. Beginning in the early-to-mid 1990s, the hardback editions (including revised and/or second editions) have been characterized by a light-tan cloth binding with crimson lettering on the spine, and the individual volumes are approximately 6.25 inches (15.9 cm) in width, 9.5 inches (24 cm) in height, and of variable thickness.

== Reception ==
Christianity Today magazine included this commentary in a list of the more significant publications and achievements of Evangelicalism in the latter half of the 20th century.

Andrew Naselli notes that when evangelical scholars and pastor-theologians list their most recommended commentaries on each book of the Bible, the NIC volumes are often the number one recommendation.

== See also ==
- New International Commentary on the Old Testament
- New International Greek Testament Commentary
- Exegesis
- Textual criticism

== Select bibliography ==
- Aland, Kurt and others (eds). Novum Testamentum Graece. 27th edition (NA27). Stuttgart: Deutsche Bibelgesellschaft.
- Metzger, Bruce and others (eds). The Greek New Testament. 4th edition (UBS4). New York: United Bible Societies.
