= Peter H. Davids =

Canadian priest and religious scholar

Doctor Peter H. Davids
- Born: November 22, 1947 (age 78); Syracuse, New York
- Occupation: Catholic Priest
- Spouse: Judith Lee (nee Bouchillon)

Academic background
- Education: Wheaton College, Trinity Evangelical Divinity School
- Alma mater: Victoria University of Manchester (PhD)
- Thesis: Themes in the Epistle of James that are Judaistic in Character (1974)
- Doctoral advisor: The Rev. Canon Dr. Stephen S. Smalley

Academic work
- Discipline: Biblical studies
- Sub-discipline: New Testament studies
- Institutions: Regent College; Trinity (Episcopal) School for Ministry; Canadian Theological Seminary; Houston Baptist University

Ecclesiastical career
- Religion: Christianity
- Church: Anglican / Episcopal Church (United States) (1979-2014); Roman Catholic (2014-)
- Ordained: June 9, 1979 (Anglican deacon); October 6, 1979 (Anglican priest); October 31, 2014 (Catholic priest)
- Congregations: Austin Avenue Chapel, Coquitlam (1983-1989); St. Stephen’s Anglican Church, Burquitlam (1983-1989); Holy Trinity Anglican Church, Regina (1989-1991); St. Andrews Anglican Church, Langley (1993-1996); All Saints Episcopal Church, Stafford (2004-2006, 2012-2014); Anglican Parish of St. Stephen, St. Stephen (2007-2008); St. Anne’s Anglican Church, Welshpool (2009-2010)

Peter Hugh Davids (born 22 November 1947) is a Canadian New Testament scholar and Catholic priest. He retired as Professor of Christianity at Houston Baptist University. He has also taught biblical studies at Regent College in Vancouver, British Columbia, Trinity (Episcopal) School for Ministry in Ambridge, Pennsylvania, and Canadian Theological Seminary in Regina, Saskatchewan.

He has a Bachelor of Arts from Wheaton College (1968), a Masters in Divinity from Trinity Evangelical Divinity School (1971), and a Ph.D. from Victoria University of Manchester (1974). Davids is author of major commentaries on the Biblical books of James and 1 Peter. He was ordained a priest in the Personal Ordinariate of the Chair of St. Peter (i.e. Anglican use) in 2014.

== Bibliography ==
- Davids, Peter H. (1982). The Epistle of James: a commentary on the Greek text. NIGTC. Grand Rapids, MI: Eerdmans. ISBN 978-0-802-82388-5. OCLC 8194492.
- ——— (1986). Suffering According to New Testament Teaching: a study in semantic differentation. Evangelical Theological Society Papers. Vol. ETS-0037. Evangelical Theological Society. OCLC 17252972.
- ——— (1990). The First Epistle of Peter. NICNT. Grand Rapids, MI: Eerdmans. ISBN 978-0-802-82347-2. OCLC 21153974.
- ———; Martin, Ralph P., eds. (1997). Dictionary of the Later New Testament & Its Developments: A Compendium of Contemporary Biblical Scholarship. Downers Grove, IL: InterVarsity Press. ISBN 978-0-8308-1779-5.
- ——— (1996). Hard Sayings of the Bible. Downers Grove, IL: InterVarsity Press. ISBN 978-0-8308-1540-1.
- ——— (2006). The Letters of 2 Peter and Jude. PNTC. Grand Rapids, MI: Eerdmans. ISBN 978-0-802-83726-4. OCLC 67383854.
- ——— (2011). 2 Peter and Jude: A Handbook on the Greek Text. Waco, TX: Baylor University Press. ISBN 978-1-602-58313-9. OCLC 693684156.
- ——— (2014). A Theology of James, Peter and Jude. Biblical Theology of the New Testament. Grand Rapids, MI: Zondervan. ISBN 978-0-310-29147-3. OCLC 874734096.

=== Articles ===
- ——— (2012). "What Glasses Are Your Wearing? Reading Hebrew Narratives Through Second Temple Lenses". Journal of the Evangelical Theological Society. 55 (4): 763–771.
- ——— (2011). "God and the Human Situation in the Letter of James". Criswell Theological Review. 8 (2): 19–29.
- ——— (2009). "The Catholic Epistles as a Canonical Janus". BBR. 19 (3): 403–416.
- ——— (2004). "The Kingdom of God Come with Power". Criswell Theological Review. New Series. 2 (1): 15–33.
- ——— (1978). "The Meaning of άπείραστος in James I. 13". New Testament Studies. 24 (3): 386–392. doi:10.1017/S0028688500004161. S2CID 170989497.
- ——— (1976). "The Poor Man's Gospel". Themelios. 1: 37–41.
- ——— (1980). "Theological Perspectives on the Epistle of James". Journal of the Evangelical Theological Society. 23: 97–104.
