= Journal of Theological Interpretation =

- Discipline: Theology, biblical hermeneutics
- Language: English
- Edited by: Joel B. Green

Publication details
- History: 2007-present
- Publisher: Eisenbrauns
- Frequency: Biannual

Standard abbreviations
- ISO 4: J. Theol. Interpret.

Indexing
- ISSN: 1936-0843
- LCCN: 2007214240
- OCLC no.: 85371381

Links
- Journal homepage

The Journal of Theological Interpretation is a biannual peer-reviewed academic journal covering theology and biblical hermeneutics. It was established in 2007 and is published by Eisenbrauns. The editor-in-chief is Joel B. Green (Fuller Theological Seminary). The journal is abstracted and indexed in ATLA Religion Database.
