= Colin G. Kruse =

Australian theologian

- Occupation: Biblical academic
- Spouse: Rosemary

Academic background
- Education: Australian College of Theology, University of London
- Alma mater: Fuller Theological Seminary (Ph.D.)

Academic work
- Discipline: Biblical studies
- Sub-discipline: New Testament studies
- Institutions: Ridley College, Melbourne School of Theology
- Notable works: Paul's Letter to the Romans (PNTC)

Dr. Colin Kruse is a bible commentator and senior lecturer in New Testament at the Melbourne School of Theology.

Kruse's academic education started at the Australian College of Theology and continued with study for his BDiv at the University of London. He remained at London to do his MPhil but moved to Fuller Theological Seminary to read for his Ph.D.

After being ordained he initially worked in the Anglican ministry with parochial responsibility in Australia and the USA. He and his wife Rosemary joined the Church Missionary Society of Australia (CMS), where he served as a theological lecturer in Indonesia. Following this he pursued an academic career first at Ridley College (for 16 years) before moving to the then Bible College of Victoria, now the Melbourne School of Theology.

He writes various journal articles on the New Testament, Old Testament, and the Dead Sea Scrolls, he has authored several books mainly of New Testament commentary and on various forms of Christian ministry. Colin recently released a commentary on Paul's Letter to the Romans for the Pillar New Testament Commentary series by Eerdmans/IVP.

Besides journal articles on the New Testament, Old Testament and the Dead Sea Scrolls, Kruse has authored several books including Paul, the Law and Justification and New Testament Models for Ministry: Jesus and Paul. He has also written the Tyndale New Testament Commentary on 2 Corinthians and the Pillar New Testament Commentary titles The Letters of John and Paul's Letter to the Romans.

== Selected works ==
=== Books ===
- Kruse, Colin G. (1983). New Testament Foundations of Ministry. Marshall's Technological Library. London: Marshall, Morgan & Scott. ISBN 978-0-5510-1005-5. OCLC 12210658.
- ——— (1983). New Testament Models for Ministry, Jesus and Paul. Nashville, TN: Thomas Nelson. ISBN 978-0-8407-5957-3. OCLC 11550418.
- ——— (1994). 2 Corinthians. Tyndale New Testament Commentaries. Vol. 8 (Revised ed.). Downers Grove: IVP Academic. ISBN 978-1-8447-4274-5.
- ——— (1996). Paul, the Law and Justification. Downers Grove: Apollos. ISBN 978-0851114415.
- ——— (2000). The Letters of John. Pillar New Testament Commentary Series. Grand Rapids: Eerdmans. ISBN 978-0-8028-3728-8.
- ——— (2004). John. Tyndale New Testament Commentaries. Vol. 4. Downers Grove: IVP Academic. ISBN 978-0-8308-4234-6.
- ——— (2012). Paul's Letter to the Romans. Pillar New Testament Commentary Series. Grand Rapids: Eerdmans. ISBN 978-0-8028-3743-1.

=== Articles & chapters ===
- ——— (1988). "The Offender and the Offence in 2 Corinthians 2:5 and 7:12". The Evangelical Quarterly. 60 (2): 129–139. doi:10.1163/27725472-06002003.
- ——— (2006). "Sin and Perfection in 1 John". Southern Baptist Journal of Theology. 10 (3): 58–66.
