= Ronald Y. K. Fung =

- Born: 1937 (age 88–89)
- Occupation: Biblical academic
- Title: Professor of Biblical Studies at China Graduate School of Theology

Academic background
- Education: University of Manchester (Ph.D.)
- Thesis: The Relationship Between Righteousness and Faith in the Thought of Paul: as Expressed in the Letters to the Galatians and the Romans (1975)

Academic work
- Discipline: Biblical studies
- Sub-discipline: New Testament studies
- Institutions: China Graduate School of Theology

Ronald Y. K. Fung (Chinese: 馮蔭坤; pinyin: Féng Yīnkūn; born 1937) was professor of Biblical Studies at China Graduate School of Theology. He is best known for his Galatians contribution to commentary series the New International Commentary on the New Testament.

== Biography ==
Fung completed a BA from the University of Hong Kong in 1960 and studied at London Bible College from 1962 to 1965, completing a BD from London University in 1966. He later completed his ThM at Fuller Theological Seminary in 1971, before completing a PhD from University of Manchester in 1975, on a thesis supervised by F. F. Bruce entitled "The Relationship Between Righteousness and Faith in the Thought of Paul: as Expressed in the Letters to the Galatians and the Romans."

Recognized as an important name in Hong Kong biblical scholarship, Fung spent most of his career as a Professor of Biblical Studies at China Graduate School of Theology in Hong Kong.

== Selected works ==
=== Books ===
- Fung, Ronald Y. K. (1988). The Epistle to the Galatians. New International Commentary on the New Testament. Grand Rapids: Eerdmans. ISBN 978-0-8028-2509-4.

=== Articles & chapters ===
- ——— (1975). The Relationship Between Righteousness and Faith in the Thought of Paul: as Expressed in the Letters to the Galatians and the Romans (PhD thesis). University of Manchester. ProQuest 302792933.
- ——— (1980). "Charismatic versus Organized Ministry? An Examination of an Alleged Antithesis". The Evangelical Quarterly. 4.
- ——— (1982). "A Note on Galatians 2:3-8". Journal of the Evangelical Theological Society. 25 (1): 49–52.
- ———; Yu, Carter T., eds. (1982). "Paul and the Ministry of Women". A Life of Ministry. Hong Kong: China Graduate School of Theology Journal. pp. 200–262.
- ——— (1984). "Ministry, Community and Spiritual Gifts". The Evangelical Quarterly. 1.
- ——— (1986). "Ministry in the New Testament". In Carson, D. A. (ed.). the Church in the Bible and the World. Exeter: Paternoster. pp. 178–212.
- ——— (1987). "Paul and the Ministry of Women Reconsidered". China Graduate School of Theology Journal. 2: 98–149.
