= China Graduate School of Theology =

Seminary in Kowloon Tong, Hong Kong

- Established: 28 September 1975; 50 years ago
- President: Bernard Wong
- Location: 12 Dorset Crescent, Kowloon Tong, Hong Kong; 22.339°N 114.177°E
- Website: www.cgst.edu

The China Graduate School of Theology (CGST) is a theological seminary in Kowloon Tong, Hong Kong. The President is Bernard Wong, who succeeded Stephen Lee in 2021.

CGST is accredited by the Asia Theological Association to offer Doctor of Philosophy, Master of Theology, Master of Christian Studies and Master of Divinity degrees. It is also a member of the Association for Theological Education in South East Asia.

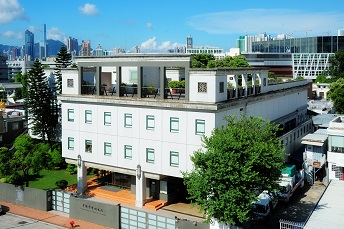
The CGST campus on Devon Road, Kowloon Tong

== History ==
CGST started on 28 September 1975. In the mid 1960s, a group of students at Westminster Theological Seminary developed the idea of establishing "an indigenous, inter-denominational, evangelical and graduate level theological institution for the purpose of training university graduates to serve the churches in China and to evangelize around the world." This group included Jonathan Chao (who became the first President) and Che Bin Tan. Tan had noticed that "in America, seminaries assume that the spiritual needs of students will be met through their church involvement". Thus, "a major aim of CGST, in reaction against the perceived neglect in America of the students' spiritual growth, has been to incorporate the spiritual dimension more effectively in the lives of the students." CGST has also been "working at specialized approaches to reach blue collar workers," including the composition of Christian hymns "using well known Chinese folk tunes".

According to its mission statement, CGST upholds the "absolute truth of the Bible's inerrancy", and "works toward a contextual theology that is relevant to and brings transformation to Chinese culture." It also values expository preaching and spiritual formation.

CGST has two campuses close together: Devon Campus on Devon Road, and Dorset Campus on Dorset Crescent.

The institution previously published a journal, the China Graduate School of Theology Journal (CGST Journal or CGSTJ). It was founded in 1986 with Wilson Chow as the editor-in chief. Publication ceased in 2013, due to a perceived need to "build up new and effective ways for conducting and publicizing theological dialogues."

== Leadership ==
- Philip Teng (1975–1988) - Honorary President
- Wilson Chow (1989–2006) - President Emeritus
- Carver Yu (2006–2013) - President Emeritus
- Stephen Lee (2013–2021) - President Emeritus
- Bernard Wong (2021–present)

== Faculty ==
=== Biblical Studies ===
- Simon CC Cheung - Henry Co See Cho Associate Professor
- Joyce WL Sun - Carver Yu Associate Professor
- Xia Xia Xue - Wilson Chow Associate Professor
- Kelvin Yu - Philip Yeung Associate Professor
- Lilian Wing Ting Li - Assistant Professor
- Johnson Yip - Assistant Professor
- Chun Luen Wu - Assistant Professor
- Edward Wong - Assistant Professor

=== Theological Studies ===
- Kin Yip Louie - Heavenly Blessings Professor
- Daniel Lee - Eleanor and Wayne Chiu Professor
- Jun Song - Philip Teng Associate Professor
- Bernard Wong - S Y King Associate Professor
- Celine Yeung - Assistant Professor
- Andrew Wong - Assistant Professor
- Cherry Hiu Ki Chan - Assistant Professor

=== Practical Studies ===
- Yi Jung Pan - Lam Ko Kit Tak Associate Professor
- Michael Chu - Josiah Mann Associate Professor
- Mo Yu So - Abundant Grace Assistant Professor
- Edwin Lam - Assistant Professor

=== Counselling Studies ===
- Raymond Au - Carson & Virginia Mok Professor
- Edmond Lam - Chan Chu So Wah Associate Professor

=== Former Faculty ===
- Ronald Y. K. Fung - prominent biblical commentator - now retired.
- Fred T. Cheung - now retired
- Carver Yu - President Emeritus - now retired.
- Phee Seng Kang - now retired.
- Philip Yeung - Honorary Chaplain
- Wai Yee Ng - now retired.
- Wallace Louie - now retired.
- Wing Hung Lam - now retired.
- Sau Wah Leung
- Jason Yeung
- Xi Yi (Kevin) Yao
- Esther Yue L. Ng
- Kin Lam - former chaplain
- Stephen Lee - President Emeritus and Visiting Professor
- Luke Cheung
- Kasper Wong
- Liang Hong
- Jane Mann
- Tracy Lo
- May Yip
- Wing Yan Chan Mok - Visiting Professor
- Ka Leung Wong
- Grace Au
- Jean Lee
- Wance Kwan
- Timothy Au
