= The Gospel According to John (Pillar New Testament Commentary) =

- Author: D. A. Carson
- Language: English
- Series: Pillar New Testament Commentary
- Subject: New Testament, Gospel of John
- Genre: Biblical commentary
- Publisher: William B. Eerdmans Publishing Company
- Publication date: 20 December 1990
- Pages: 715
- ISBN: 0802836836
- Preceded by: The Epistle to the Romans
- Followed by: The Gospel according to Matthew

The Gospel According to John is a part of the Pillar New Testament Commentary series. It provides a comprehensive introduction to the Gospel of John. It was published in 1990 and written by D. A. Carson, who is also the General Editor of the series.

In 1992, Christianity Today magazine awarded it Number 1 Critic's Choice for Commentaries and Runner-up Reader's Choice.
