= Lynn H. Cohick =

American New Testament scholar and author

Lynn H. Cohick is an American New Testament scholar, author, professor, and administrator at Houston Christian University.

== Education ==
Cohick holds a BA from Messiah College in Religious Studies. She completed the PhD program at the University of Pennsylvania where she looked at the relationship between Jews and Christians in the ancient world, in particular the second century figure Melito of Sardis and his work Peri Pascha. Her subsequent book, The Peri Pascha Attributed to Melito of Sardis: Setting, Purpose, and Sources, is one of the only major studies on this work.

== Career ==
Cohick taught pastors and church leaders at the Nairobi Evangelical Graduate School of Theology in Kenya. Her international teaching also includes courses at Brisbane School of Theology and Ridley College in Australia and Regent College in Canada.

Cohick taught New Testament at Wheaton College from 2000 to 2018, sequentially serving as vice-chair of the Faculty, chairing the Bible and Theology Department, and as interim dean of Humanities and Theological Studies, in her three last years at Wheaton College.

Cohick was Provost, Dean and Professor of New Testament at Denver Seminary from 2018 to 2020.

In January 2021, she commenced at Northern Seminary in Chicago as Provost, Dean of Academic Affairs and Professor of New Testament after a national search attracting 15 diverse applicants. Cohick was involved in launching a new master's degree program in Women's Studies at Northern Seminary in April 2021.

In April 2023, Cohick was appointed Distinguished Professor of New Testament, leader of the Doctor of Ministry program, and Director of Houston Theological Seminary, a school within Houston Christian University.

Cohick is a member of the Evangelical Theological Society, the Institute for Biblical Research, the North American Patristics Society and the Studiorum Novi Testamenti Societas. She became President of the Institute for Biblical Research in 2019. She has also been involved with the Langham Partnership. In 2020, Cohick joined the Board of Trustees of Biola University, located in La Mirada, CA.

Cohick's research has focused on the Christian faith in its ancient Hellenistic setting within the Roman Empire. She believes the apostle Paul's teaching on women has been taken out of context. She believes there has been an "evangelical shortsightedness" and lack of "historical memory" that does not acknowledge the significant roles of women in the church throughout the whole of church history. She has written a number of books and commentaries on Pauline epistles.

From 2017 to 2018, Cohick co-hosted a weekly podcast called Theology for Life with Ed Stetzer. Between 2021 and 2022, Cohick created and hosted a weekly podcast, The Alabaster Jar, sometimes with Northern Seminary students or colleagues. In 2023, The Alabaster Jar podcast was relaunched under the umbrella of The Center for Women in Leadership, a registered 501c3 and Texas non-profit organization co-founded by Cohick.

== Personal life ==
Cohick is married; her husband is a musician.

== Selected publications ==
- Cohick, Lynn H. (2000). The Peri Pascha Attributed to Melito of Sardis: Setting, Purpose, and Sources. Brown Judaic Studies. ISBN 978-1-930675-03-2.
- Cohick, Lynn H. (2009). Women in the World of the Earliest Christians: Illuminating Ancient Ways of Life. Baker Academic. ISBN 9781441207999.
- Burge, Gary M.; Cohick, Lynn H.; Green, Gene L. (2010). The New Testament in Antiquity: A Survey of the New Testament within Its Cultural Context. Zondervan Academic. ISBN 9780310590613.
- Cohick, Lynn H. (2011). Romans. Immersion Bible Studies. Abingdon Press. ISBN 9781426709869.
- Cohick, Lynn H. (2013). Philippians. The Story of God Bible Commentary. Zondervan Academic. ISBN 9780310599135.
- Cohick, Lynn H. (2013). Ephesians. A New Covenant Commentary. ISD LLC. ISBN 9780718843311.
- Cohick, Lynn H. (2013). "Women, Children, and Families in the Greco-Roman world". In Joel B. Green; Lee Martin McDonald (eds.). The World of the New Testament: Cultural, Social, and Historical Contexts. Baker ACademic. pp. 179–187. ISBN 9781441240545.
- Cohick, Lynn H.; Brown Hughes, Amy (2017). Christian Women in the Patristic World: Their Influence, Authority, and Legacy in the Second through Fifth Centuries. Baker Academic. ISBN 9781493410217.
- Cohick, Lynn H. (2019). Philippians, a Video Study: 16 Lessons on History, Meaning, and Application. Zondervan Academic. ISBN 9780310093701.
- Cohick, Lynn H. (2020). The Letter to the Ephesians. New International Commentary on the New Testament. Eerdmans. ISBN 9781467459464.
