= Grant R. Osborne =

American theologian (1942–2018)

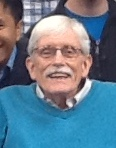
- Osborne with class after delivering final lecture before retiring
- Born: July 7, 1942; Queens, New York City, NY
- Died: November 4, 2018 (aged 76); Libertyville, Illinois
- Occupations: Theologian and New Testament scholar
- Title: Professor of New Testament at Trinity Evangelical Divinity School
- Spouse: Nancy Osborne
- Children: 2

Academic background
- Education: Aberdeen University (PhD)
- Thesis: History and Theology in the Resurrection Narratives: A Redactional Study (1974)
- Doctoral advisor: I. Howard Marshall

Academic work
- Discipline: Biblical hermeneutics
- Sub-discipline: New Testament studies
- Notable works: The Hermeneutical Spiral

Grant R. Osborne (July 7, 1942 – November 4, 2018) was an American theologian and New Testament scholar. He was Professor of New Testament at Trinity Evangelical Divinity School.

== Biography ==
=== Education ===
Osborne got a B.A. from the Fort Wayne Bible College, a M.A. from the Trinity Evangelical Divinity School, and a PhD from the University of Aberdeen. He also did postdoctoral research at the university of Cambridge and University of Marburg.

=== Career ===
Osborne taught at Winnipeg Theological Seminary and the university of Aberdeen and has pastored churches in Ohio and Illinois. From 1977 to 2016, he was professor of New Testament at the Trinity Evangelical Divinity School.

He specialized in biblical hermeneutics, the Gospels and the book of Revelation. He is best known for his concept of the "hermeneutical spiral", denoting an "upward and constructive process of moving from earlier pre-, understanding to fuller understanding, and the returning back to check and to review the need for correction or change in this preliminary understanding."

He was a member of the Bible Translation Committee for the Holy Bible: New Living Translation. He served as General Translator for the Gospels and Acts.

He was a member of the Society of Biblical Literature, the Evangelical Theological Society, and the Institute of Biblical Research.

In 2013, a Festschrift was published in his honor. On the Writing of New Testament Commentaries: Festschrift for Grant R. Osborne on the Occasion of His 70th Birthday included contributions from Craig L. Blomberg, D. A. Carson, Scot McKnight, Douglas J. Moo, Stanley E. Porter, and Kevin J. Vanhoozer.

=== Theology ===
Osborne held Arminian soteriological views. In "A classical Arminian view", he wrote in favour of a possible apostasy for the genuine believer.

== Works ==
=== Books ===
- Osborne, Grant R.; Woodward, Stephen B. (1979). Handbook for Bible Study. Grand Rapids, MI: Baker Book House. ISBN 978-0-801-06665-8. OCLC 5390376.
- ——— (1984). The Resurrection Narratives: a redactional study. Grand Rapids, MI: Baker Book House. ISBN 978-0-801-02707-9. OCLC 53231282.
- ——— (1997). The Hermeneutical Spiral: A Comprehensive Introduction to Biblical Interpretation (1st ed.). Downers Grove, IL: InterVarsity Press. ISBN 978-0-830-81272-1. OCLC 24378043.
- ——— (1994). Three Crucial Questions about the Bible. 3 crucial questions. Grand Rapids, MI: Baker Book House. ISBN 978-0-801-05273-6. OCLC 33407867.
- ——— (2002). Revelation. Baker Exegetical Commentary on the New Testament. Grand Rapids, MI: Baker Academic. ISBN 978-0-801-02299-9. OCLC 49226276.
- ——— (2004). Romans. IVP New Testament Commentary. Downers Grove, IL: IVP. ISBN 9780830840069. OCLC 878132472.
- ——— (2010). Matthew. Zondervan Exegetical Commentary on the New Testament. Vol. 1. Grand Rapids, MI: Zondervan. ISBN 978-0-310-24357-1. OCLC 286514436.
- ——— (2010). The Hermeneutical Spiral: A Comprehensive Introduction to Biblical Interpretation (Revised ed.). Downers Grove, IL: InterVarsity Press. ISBN 978-0-8308-7877-2.
- ——— (2014). Mark. Teach the Text commentary series. Grand Rapids, MI: Baker Book House. ISBN 978-0-801-09219-0. OCLC 869268876.
- ———; Trueman, Carl R.; Hammett, John S. (2015). Perspectives on the Extent of the Atonement: 3 views. Nashville, TN: B & H Academic. ISBN 9781433669712. OCLC 881665298.
- Osborne, Grant R. (2016). Revelation: Verse by Verse. Osborne New Testament Commentaries. Bellingham, WA: Lexham Press. ISBN 978-1-57799-734-4.

=== Edited by ===
- ———; McKnight, Scot, eds. (2004). The Face of New Testament Studies: a survey of recent research. Grand Rapids, MI: Baker Academic. ISBN 9780801027079. OCLC 53231282.
- ———; Laansma, Jon C.; Van Neste, Ray, eds. (2011). New Testament Theology in Light of the Church's Mission: Essays in Honor of I. Howard Marshall. Eugene, OR: Cascade Books. ISBN 978-1-610-97530-8. OCLC 768487238.

=== Chapters ===
- ——— (1984). "Redaction Criticism and the Great Commission: A Case Study Toward a Biblical Understanding of Inerrancy". In Youngblood, Ronald (ed.). Evangelicals and Inerrancy: Selections from the Journal of the Evangelical Theological Society. Nashville, TN: Thomas Nelson Publishers. pp. 186–198.
- ——— (2007). "A Classical Arminian View". In Bateman, Herbert W. (ed.). Four Views on the Warning Passages in Hebrews (PDF). Grand Rapids, MI: Kregel Publications.

== Festschrift ==
- Porter, Stanley E.; Schnabel, Eckhard J., eds. (2013). On the Writing of New Testament Commentaries: festschrift for Grant R. Osborne on the occasion of his 70th birthday. Texts and editions for New Testament study. Leiden: Brill. ISBN 9789004232921. OCLC 818786823.

== Notes and references ==
=== Sources ===
- Allen, David L. (2010). Hebrews: An Exegetical and Theological Exposition of Holy Scripture. Nashville: B&H Publishing.
- Melick, Richard R. (2013). "Can We Understand the Bible?". In Defense of the Bible: A Comprehensive Apologetic for the Authority of Scripture. B&H Publishing. p. 114. ISBN 9781433676789.
- McKnight, Scot (2018). "Grant Osborne". Jesus Creed. Patheos.
- Thiselton, Anthony C. (2009). Hermeneutics: An Introduction. Wm. B. Eerdmans. p. 14. ISBN 9780802864109.
- TIU (2019). "Professors Emeriti". Trinity International University.
- Wright, R. K. McGregor (1996). No Place for Sovereignty: What's Wrong with Freewill Theism. Downers Grove: InterVarsity.
