= Exegesis (disambiguation) =

Exegesis is extensive and critical interpretation of authoritative text, especially a religious text.

Exegesis may also refer to:

- Exegesis on the Soul, an ancient Gnostic text from the Nag Hammadi library describing the soul’s fall and salvation through repentance and spiritual rebirth
- The Exegesis of Philip K. Dick, a mystical autobiography by Philip K. Dick
- Exegesis, a science fiction novel by Astro Teller
- Exegesis (group), a new religious movement
