= Institute for Biblical Research =

The Institute for Biblical Research established in 1973 is "an organization of evangelical Christian scholars with specialties in Old and New Testament and in ancillary disciplines". It describes its vision as "to foster excellence in the pursuit of Biblical Studies within a faith environment." It pursues these goals by means of publications, workshops and conferences.

== History ==
The IBR was established under the leadership of E. Earle Ellis, the organisation's founding chair from 1973 to 1981. The original intention was the establishment of a North American-based residential reference library similar to that of the Tyndale Fellowship for Biblical Research, Tyndale House Library, Cambridge, England. From 1970 to its establishment, a number of scholars calling themselves the Tyndale Committee discussed the viability of creating a residential library, concluding that it would require an associated society, which came with the establishment of the IBR in 1973.

By 2006, the IBR had 521 members composed of 412 Fellows, 41 Associates, 32 Friends and 36 Retired members.

== Presidents ==
Since foundation, the IBR presidents have been:

Years	President
1973-1981 (Chair)	E. Earle Ellis
1981-1983 (Chair)	Bastian van Elderen
1983-1989	Edwin Yamauchi
1989-1993	Gerald Hawthorne
1993-1995	Klyne Snodgrass
1996-2002	Bastian van Elderen
2002-2005	Daniel Block
2006-2012	Lee McDonald
2012-2018	Tremper Longman III
2019–2024	Lynn H. Cohick
2024–Present	Andrew T. Abernethy

== Publications ==
In 1989 the IBR launched the Bulletin for Biblical Research (BBR) under the editorship of Bruce Chilton, published by Eisenbrauns. The current editor is Miguel G. Echevarría.

The BBR Supplement Series was established in 2007 and published monographs. Since 1992, Baker Book House published a series of IBR-sponsored bibliographies on topics such as the Historical Jesus, Old Testament Introduction, New Testament Introduction, the Pentateuch and the Pauline Letters.
