= E. Earle Ellis =

American biblical scholar

- Born: Edward Earle Ellis; March 18, 1926; Fort Lauderdale, Florida
- Died: March 3, 2010 (aged 83)
- Burial place: Dallas–Fort Worth National Cemetery
- Occupations: Biblical Scholar, Professor, Theologian

Academic background
- Education: University of Virginia (B.Sc.); Wheaton College (MA, BD); University of Edinburgh (Ph.D.)
- Thesis: The Use of the Old Testament in the Pauline Epistles (1955)
- Doctoral advisor: Matthew Black; James Stuart Stewart

Academic work
- School or tradition: Southern Baptist
- Main interests: NT studies Use of the Old Testament in the New
- Notable works: Paul's Use of the Old Testament; Eschatology in Luke; The Old Testament in Early Christianity; Sovereignty of God in Salvation

Edward Earle Ellis (March 18, 1926 – March 2, 2010) was an American biblical scholar. Ellis served as research professor of Theology Emeritus at Southwestern Baptist Theological Seminary in Fort Worth, Texas, joining the institution in 1985.

== Early life ==
Ellis was born to Lindsey Thornton and Lois Belle McBride Ellis in Fort Lauderdale, Florida. Ellis served in the United States Army from 1944 to 1946. Following he completed a Bachelor of Science degree at the University of Virginia in 1950, with concentrations in law, economics, political science and history. Ellis studied at the University of Virginia School of Law and intended to enter into a career in law. However, he left legal studies in order to pursue biblical studies.

He studied at Faith Seminary in Wilmington, Delaware, but soon moved to the Wheaton Graduate School in Wheaton, Ill. From Wheaton he received MA and BA degrees by 1953. Two years later, he was awarded with a PhD degree from the University of Edinburgh.

== Academic life ==
Ellis served in universities and seminaries throughout the United States, including the Southern Baptist Theological Seminary and Southwestern Seminary. He also founded the Institute for Biblical Research and the International Reference Library for Biblical Research. At Southwestern he served as research professor of theology (1985–1998) and then as research professor of Theology Emeritus.

Prior to Southwestern Seminary Ellis taught at New Brunswick Theological Seminary (1977–85); Bethel Theological Seminary (1960–77); Southern Baptist Theological Seminary (1958–60); and Aurora College (1955–58).

In 1987, a Festschrift was published in his honor. Tradition and Interpretation in the New Testament: Essays in Honor of E. Earle Ellis for His 60th Birthday included contributions from C. K. Barrett, Richard N. Longenecker, I. Howard Marshall, C. F. D. Moule, F. F. Bruce, and Peder Borgen.

== Selected works ==
=== Thesis ===
- Ellis, Edward Earle (1955). The use of the Old Testament in the Pauline epistles (PhD diss. in Theology at New College of the Univ. of Edinburgh). hdl:1842/34040.

=== Books ===
- Ellis, E. Earle (1957). Paul's Use of the Old Testament. Edinburgh & London: Oliver and Boyd. ISBN 9781592441945.
- ——— (1961). Paul and His Recent Interpreters. Grand Rapids, MI: Eerdmans. ISBN 9781592445820.
- ——— (1965). The World of St. John: the Gospel and the Epistles. Lutterworth Press. ISBN 9780718800697.
- ——— (1966). The Gospel of Luke. New Century Bible Commentary. Grand Rapids, MI: Eerdmans. ISBN 9780551008496.
- ——— (1972). Eschatology in Luke. Fortress Press. ISBN 9780800630706.
- ——— (1978). Prophecy and Hermeneutic in Early Christianity: New Testament essays. Grand Rapids, MI: Eerdmans. ISBN 9780802816894.
- ——— (1989). Pauline Theology: Ministry and Society. Grand Rapids, MI: Eerdmans. ISBN 9781597520911.
- ——— (1991). The Old Testament in Early Christianity: canon and interpretation in the light of modern research. Grand Rapids, MI: Naker Books. ISBN 9780801032172.
- ——— (1999). The Making of the New Testament Documents. Leiden: Brill. ISBN 9780391041684.
- ——— (2000). Christ and the Future in New Testament History. Leiden: Brill. ISBN 9780391041240.
- ——— (2001). History and Interpretation in New Testament Perspective. Leiden: Brill. ISBN 9789004120266.
- ——— (2009). Sovereignty of God in Salvation. A&B Black. ISBN 9780567606648.

=== Chapters & Articles ===
- ——— (1957). "Segregation and the Kingdom of God". Christianity Today. 1 (12): 6–9.
- ——— (1989). "How Jesus Interpreted His Bible". Criswell Theological Review. 3 (2): 341–51.
- ——— (1993). "Jesus' Use of the Old Testament and The Genesis of New Testament Theology". Bulletin for Biblical Research. 3: 59–75.
- ——— (2002). "God's sovereign grace in salvation and the nature of man's free will". Southwestern Journal of Theology. 44: 28–43.
