= Jacqueline Lapsley =

American academic

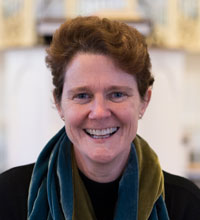
- Jacqueline Lapsley
- Born: February 24, 1965 (age 61)

Academic background
- Education: University of North Carolina at Chapel Hill (MA); Princeton Theological Seminary (MDiv); Emory University (PhD)

Jacqueline E. Lapsley (born February 24, 1965) serves as President, and Professor of Old Testament at Union Presbyterian Seminary, and she is an ordained ruling elder in the Presbyterian Church (USA). She previously served as Dean and Vice President of Academic Affairs and Professor of Old Testament at Princeton Theological Seminary (PTS) (2018 – 2023). Her work focuses on theological interpretations of the Old Testament, and her research interests lie in various fields, including literary theory, ethics (with a specific focus on creation ethics), theological anthropology, and gender theory.

== Education ==
Lapsey earned a Master of Arts from the University of North Carolina at Chapel Hill, a Master of Divinity from Princeton Seminary, and a Doctor of Philosophy from Emory University.

== Career ==
=== Academia ===
As an academic, Lapsley is dedicated to studying the Bible in a way that enriches the lives of those who actively participate in faith communities and have a strong commitment to their faith. She believes in the transformative potential of informed scriptural interpretation, and argues that it can contribute to the well-being and growth of individuals, faith communities, and the world at large.

In Old Testament studies, Lapsley is known for writings and teachings in feminist biblical interpretation and the intersection of environmental issues and biblical interpretation, as well as in Ezekiel studies. In previous courses, Lapsley has explored topics such as sin, the portrayal of women in Old Testament narratives, and salvation in the Old Testament. Within these subjects, she specifically examines how moral development and personal identity are expressed in the scriptures. Presently, her courses concentrate on gender theory and creation ethics within the Old Testament. Lapsley's ongoing research and writing revolve around the interconnection between human dignity and the inherent worth of creation.

In addition to teaching and writing, Lapseley has worked on various leadership committees and editorial boards. She was previously the director at PTS's Center for Theology, Women, and Gender and co-chaired the Ethics and Biblical Interpretation section of the Society of Biblical Literature. She has also been on PTS's The Farminary steering committees. At present, Lapsley is on the editorial boards of The Catholic Biblical Quarterly, Hebrew Bible and Ancient Israel, and the Interpretation Commentary Series with co-editors Brian Blount, Beverly Gavanta, and Samuel Adams.

In 2012, her 2011 book A Dictionary of Scripture and Ethics received the Reference Book of the Year from the Academy of Parish Clergy.

For Lapsley,

the Bible offers important perspectives on human finitude and limits. It also offers perspectives on human vocation--what are we supposed to be doing while on earth? In the Bible, we read about a God who cares not just about us, human beings, but also about how we treat non-human creatures. This biblical vision of the nature and integrity of creation is diametrically opposed to the attitude of the industrialized West toward the environment. How did the Bible's vision become so distorted in the Christian West that we have produced such widespread environmental degradation?"

She also claims that “an appreciation of gender diversity can move our society toward real justice for women and other persons who are marginalized because of gender and/or sexuality."

=== Preaching ===
In addition to her work in academia, Lapsley is an ordained Presbyterian elder and teaches and preaches in congregations. She has also been the chair of her local congregation's Earth Care Team.

== Select publications ==
=== Articles ===
- “Alternative Worlds: Reading the Bible as Scripture In Engaging Biblical Authority: Perspectives on the Bible as Scripture, edited by William P. Brown (Westminster John Knox Press, 2007)
- “Ezekiel Through the Spectacles of Faith In Reformed Theology: Identity and Ecumenicity II: Biblical Interpretation in the Reformed Tradition, edited by Michael Welker and Wallace M. Alston Jr. (Wm. B. Eerdmans, 2007)
- “A Feeling for God: Emotions and Moral Formation in Ezekiel In Character Ethics and the Old Testament: Appropriating Scripture for Moral Life, edited by M. Daniel Carroll R. and Jacqueline E. Lapsley (Westminster John Knox Press, 2007)
- “Ezekiel,” in The New Interpreter’s Bible One Volume Commentary, ed. Beverly Roberts Gaventa and David Petersen (Abingdon Press, 2010)
- “Dignity for All: Humanity in the Context of Creation," in Restorative Readings: Old Testament, Ethics, Human Dignity, ed. Bruce C. Birch and Julianna Classes (Louisville: WJK, 2015), 141–144.
- “Reading Psalm 146 in the Wild," in After Exegesis: Feminist Biblical Theology in Honor of Carol A. Newsom, ed. Jacqueline E. Lapsley and Patricia K. Tull (Waco, TX: Baylor University Press, 2015), 77–90.
- “New Books: Old Testament,” The Christian Century (April 2016)
- “The Proliferation of Grotesque Bodies in Ezekiel: The Case of Ezekiel 23,” in Ezekiel: Current Debates and Future Directions (FAT 1; Mohr Siebeck, 2016)
- “A Theology of Creation—Critical and Christian," in Theology of the Hebrew Bible: Jewish and Christian Readings (SBL Resources for Biblical Study Monograph; Atlanta: SBL, 2016)

=== Books written and edited ===
- Can These Bones Live?: The Problem of the Moral Self in the Book of Ezekiel (Walter de Gruyter, 2000)
- Whispering the Word: Hearing Women’s Stories in the Old Testament (Westminster John Knox Press, 2005)
- Character Ethics and the Old Testament: Moral Dimensions in Scripture, coedited with M. Daniel Carroll R. (Westminster John Knox Press, 2007)
- A Dictionary of Scripture and Ethics, associate editor with Joel Green (general editor), Rebekah Miles, and Allen Verhey (associate editors) (Baker Academic, 2011)
- A Women’s Bible Commentary, 3rd edition, co-edited with Carol A. Newsom and Sharon H. Ringe (Westminster John Knox Press, 2012)
- The Old Testament and Ethics: A Book-by-Book Survey, co-editor with Joel Green (Grand Rapids: Baker Academic, 2013)
- After Exegesis: Feminist Biblical Theology, co-edited (Baylor University Press, 2015)
- Bible and Ethics in the Christian Life: A New Conversation, co-authored (Fortress, 2018)

=== Journals edited ===
- “Gender and Method” issue of Hebrew Bible and Ancient Israel (2016)
