= Gerald F. Hawthorne =

American New Testament scholar (1925-2010)

Gerald F. Hawthorne (August 16, 1925 – August 4, 2010) was an American New Testament scholar. He taught Greek at Wheaton College from 1953 until his retirement in 1995.

Hawthorne was born on August 16, 1925, and studied at Visalia Junior College, the Bible Institute of Los Angeles, and Wheaton College, before obtaining a Ph.D. from the University of Chicago under the supervision of Allen Wikgren.

Hawthorne co-founded the Institute for Biblical Research in 1973 and served as its president from 1989 to 1993. He wrote the Philippians volume in the Word Biblical Commentary series (1983) and was co-editor of IVP's Dictionary of Paul and His Letters (1993). He died on August 4, 2010.

In 2003, a Festschrift was published in his honor. New Testament Greek and Exegesis: Essays in Honor of Gerald F. Hawthorne included contributions by David Aune and Bart Ehrman.
