= Scot McKnight =

American theologian (born 1953)

The Reverend Canon Scot McKnight
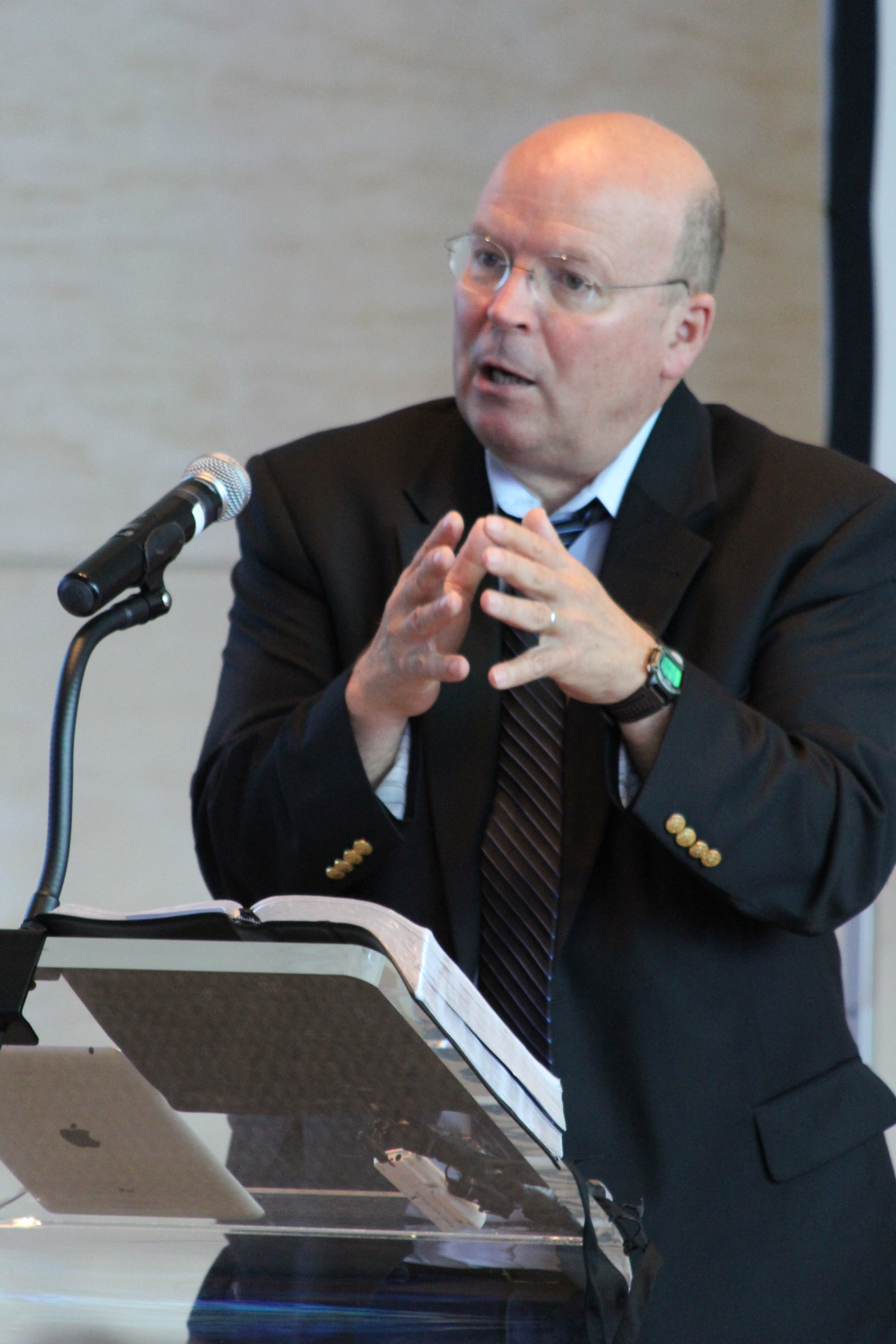
- McKnight speaking at ACU's Summit in 2013
- Born: 1953 (age 72–73)
- Occupations: New Testament scholar, historian of early Christianity, theologian, speaker, author and blogger
- Spouse: Kristen
- Children: 2

Ecclesiastical career
- Religion: Christian (Anglican)
- Church: Anglican Church in North America
- Ordained: 2014 (deacon)
- Congregations: Church of the Redeemer in Highwood, Illinois

Academic background
- Education: Cornerstone University (B.A.); Trinity Evangelical Divinity School (M.A.); University of Nottingham (Ph.D.)
- Thesis: New Shepherds for Israel: An Historical and Critical Study of Matthew 9:35-11:1 (1986)
- Doctoral advisor: James D. G. Dunn

Academic work
- Discipline: Theology
- Sub-discipline: Biblical studies, Biblical theology, Biblical hermeneutics
- School or tradition: Evangelical Anglicanism
- Institutions: North Park University; Trinity Evangelical Divinity School; Northern Baptist Theological Seminary
- Notable works: The Jesus Creed (2004); Praying with the Church (2006); The Blue Parakeet (2008); The King Jesus Gospel (2011); A Long Faithfulness (2013); Kingdom Conspiracy (2014); A Fellowship of Differents (2015); The Heaven Promise (2015); The Hum of Angels (2017); Open to the Spirit (2018); It Takes a Church to Baptize (2018); Pastor Paul (2019); A Church Called Tov (2020); Pivot (2023); Revelation for the Rest of Us (2023)
- Website: scotmcknight.substack.com

Scot McKnight (born 1953) is an American New Testament scholar, historian of early Christianity, theologian, and author who has written widely on the historical Jesus, early Christianity, and Christian living. He served as the Julius R. Mantey Chair of New Testament at Northern Baptist Theological Seminary in Lisle, Illinois, but announced in January 2024 that he would leave the faculty by the end of the academic year, due to allegations of mismanagement among the leadership at Northern and the way the board handled those allegations.

McKnight is an ordained Anglican deacon and canon theologian for the Diocese of Churches for the Sake of Others with anabaptist leanings, and has also written on issues in modern anabaptism.

== Childhood and education ==
McKnight was raised in Freeport, Illinois. He earned a B.A. from Grand Rapids Baptist College (now known as Cornerstone University), an M.A. from Trinity Evangelical Divinity School, and, in 1986, a Ph.D. from the University of Nottingham, where he studied under James D. G. Dunn, who is known for his work on the New Perspective on Paul.

== Career ==
McKnight began his career at Trinity Evangelical Divinity School, first as Assistant Professor of New Testament Greek Exegesis from 1987 to 1992, then as Associate Professor from 1992 to 1995. He was appointed the Karl A. Olsson Professor in Religious Studies at North Park University from 1995 to 2013. Then in 2013, he took up a post as Professor of New Testament at Northern Seminary and, in 2015, was appointed the Julius R. Mantey Professor of New Testament.

On January 3, 2024 McKnight announced with "grief and lament" that he would be resigning from Northern Seminary, effective at the end of the academic year. This comes after other resignations in 2023 from Northern due to allegations of abuse of power by the former President of the seminary.

== Jesus Creed ==
McKnight is a prolific author, and has written more than fifty books. His book The Jesus Creed won the Christianity Today book award for 2004 in the area of Christian living, and has spawned a number of small group studies and a DVD series.

McKnight's former blog, Jesus Creed (formerly hosted by Beliefnet and then by Patheos) was one of the most popular Evangelical blogs online. He now writes at Substack.

McKnight is an author and speaker on issues related to the emerging church; his blog was named the most popular blog online related to the movement. He has supported many of the movement's aims. In recent years, however, he has expressed concern about the direction of the movement, particularly regarding the "emergent" stream within the emerging church and some of the work of Brian McLaren. McKnight and California pastor Dan Kimball more or less officially broke with the emerging movement, and have since formed ReGeneration, an initiative that focuses on ministry to and with young adults.

McKnight has lectured in numerous countries, including Canada, South Korea, Australia, New Zealand, South Africa, Denmark, England, and Ireland. He has also been identified with the New Perspective on Paul.

== Personal life ==
McKnight and his wife, Kristen, a psychologist, live in Libertyville, Illinois and have two grown children. He and his daughter, Laura Barringer, coauthored A Church Called Tov (2019) and Pivot (2023) as well as the children's version of The Jesus Creed, called Sharing God's Love: The Jesus Creed for Children (2014). His son, Lukas McKnight, was a minor league catcher in the Chicago Cubs system.

In April 2014 McKnight announced that he had joined the Anglican Church in North America (ACNA), a denomination founded by former members of the Episcopal Church of the United States and the Anglican Church of Canada. On April 26, 2014 he was ordained into Anglican Holy Orders as a Deacon at Church of the Redeemer in Highwood, Illinois by Bishop Todd Hunter. In January 2017, McKnight began a series of posts explaining more about his transition into the Anglican tradition. He emphasized how much the church calendar was key in his decision to become Anglican, and included screen shots from Robert Webber's 2004 book Ancient Future Time: Forming Spirituality through the Christian Year.

== Works ==
=== Books ===
- McKnight, Scot (1988). Interpreting the Synoptic Gospels. Guides to New Testament Exegesis. Vol. 2. Grand Rapids, MI: Baker Books. ISBN 978-0-801-06235-3. OCLC 17805736.
- ——— (1989). Introducing New Testament Interpretation. Guides to New Testament Exegesis. Vol. 1. Grand Rapids, MI: Baker Books. ISBN 978-0-801-06260-5. OCLC 20522962.
- ——— (1991). A Light Among the Gentiles: Jewish missionary activity in the Second Temple period. Minneapolis, MN: Fortress Pres. ISBN 9780800624521. OCLC 22451115.
- ———; Green, Joel B.; Marshall, I. Howard, eds. (1992). Dictionary of Jesus and the Gospels. IVP Bible Dictionary Series. Vol. 6 (1st ed.). Downers Grove, IL: InterVarsity Press. ISBN 978-0-830-81777-1. OCLC 24538732.
- ——— (1993). Galatians: from Biblical text - to contemporary life. NIV Application Commentary. Grand Rapids, MI: Zondervan. ISBN 978-0-310-48470-7. OCLC 30594629.
- ——— (1996). 1 Peter: from Biblical text - to contemporary life. NIV Application Commentary. Grand Rapids, MI: Zondervan. ISBN 978-0-310-49290-0. OCLC 33080191.
- ——— (1999). A New Vision for Israel: The Teachings of Jesus in National Context. Grand Rapids, MI: Eerdmans. ISBN 978-0-802-84212-1. OCLC 40347339.
- ———; Williams, Matthew (2000). The Synoptic Gospels: An Annotated Bibliography. Grand Rapids, MI: Revell. ISBN 978-0801022272.
- ——— (2002). Turning to Jesus: The Sociology of Conversion in the Gospels. Louisville, KY: Westminster, John Knox Press. ISBN 978-0-664-22514-8. OCLC 49210209.
- ——— (2004). The Jesus Creed: Loving God, Loving Others. Brewster, MA: Paraclete Press. ISBN 978-1-557-25400-9. OCLC 55665399.
- ———; Osborne, Grant R., eds. (2004). The Face of New Testament Studies: a survey of recent research. Grand Rapids, MI; Leicester, England: Baker Academic; Apollos. ISBN 978-0-801-02707-9. OCLC 53231282.
- ——— (2005). Embracing Grace: A Gospel for All of Us. Brewster, MA: Paraclete Press. ISBN 978-1-557-25453-5.
- ———; Dunn, James D. G., eds. (2005). The Historical Jesus in Current Study. Sources for Biblical and Theological Study. Vol. 10. Winona Lake, IN: Eisenbrauns. ISBN 978-1-575-06100-9. OCLC 61445802.
- ——— (2005). Jesus And His Death: Historiography, the Historical Jesus, And Atonement Theory. Waco, TX: Baylor University Press. ISBN 978-1-932-79229-4. OCLC 61211229.
- ——— (2005). The Story of the Christ. London: Continuum. ISBN 978-0-826-48018-7.
- ——— (2006). Praying with the Church: Following Jesus Daily, Hourly, Today. Brewster, MA: Paraclete Press. ISBN 978-1-557-25481-8.
- ——— (2006). The Real Mary: Why Evangelical Christians Can Embrace the Mother of Jesus. Brewster, MA: Paraclete Press. ISBN 978-1-557-25523-5. OCLC 71312773.
- ——— (2007). A Community Called Atonement. Living Theology. Nashville, TN: Abingdon Press. ISBN 978-0-687-64554-1. OCLC 81942825.
- ——— (2008). The Blue Parakeet: Rethinking How You Read the Bible. Grand Rapids, MI: Zondervan. ISBN 978-0-310-28488-8. OCLC 192081154.
- ———; Modica, Joseph B., eds. (2008). Who do my Opponents Say I Am?: an investigation of the accusations against Jesus. Library of New Testament Studies. Vol. 327. London: T & T Clark. ISBN 978-0-567-03126-6. OCLC 170035734.
- ——— (2010). One.Life: Jesus Calls, We Follow. Grand Rapids, MI: Zondervan. ISBN 978-0-310-27766-8.
- ——— (2011). The Letter of James. NICNT. Grand Rapids, MI: Eerdmans. ISBN 978-0-802-82627-5. OCLC 644647197.
- ——— (2011). The King Jesus Gospel: The Original Good News Revisited. Grand Rapids, MI: Zondervan. ISBN 978-0-310-49298-6.
- ——— (2013). A Long Faithfulness: The Case For Christian Perseverance. Patheos Press. ISBN 978-1-629-21469-6.
- ——— (2013). The Sermon on the Mount. The Story of God Bible Commentary. Grand Rapids, MI: Zondervan. ISBN 978-0310327134. OCLC 900633393.
- ——— (2013). Jesus is Lord, Caesar is Not: evaluating empire in New Testament studies. Downers Grove, IL: IVP Academic. ISBN 978-0-830-83991-9. OCLC 812258103.
- ——— (2014). Kingdom Conspiracy: returning to the radical mission of the local church. Grand Rapids, MI: Brazos Press. ISBN 9781587433603. OCLC 869268977.
- ———; Barringer, Laura McKnight (2014). Sharing God's Love: The Jesus Creed for Children. Brewster, MA: Paraclete Press. ISBN 978-1-612-61581-3.
- ——— (2015). A Fellowship of Differents: Showing the World God's Design for Life Together. Grand Rapids, MI: Zondervan. ISBN 978-0-310-27767-5.
- ——— (2016). The Apostle Paul and the Christian life: ethical and missional implications of the new perspective. Grand Rapids, MI: Baker Academic. ISBN 978-0-801-04976-7.
- ———; Venema, Dennis R. (2017). Adam and the Genome: Reading Scripture after Genetic Science. Grand Rapids, MI: Brazos Press. ISBN 978-1-587-43394-8.
- ——— (2017). The Letter to Philemon. NICNT. Grand Rapids, MI: Eerdmans. ISBN 978-0-802-87382-8. OCLC 972802438.
- ——— (2018). The Letter to the Colossians. NICNT. Grand Rapids, MI: Eerdmans. ISBN 978-0-802-86798-8. OCLC 1006532704.
- ——— (2018). It Takes a Church to Baptize: What the Bible Says about Infant Baptism. Grand Rapids, MI: Brazos Press. ISBN 9781493414635.
- ———; Barringer, Laura (2020). A Church Called Tov: Forming a Goodness Culture That Resists Abuses of Power and Promotes Healing. Grand Rapids, MI: Tyndale Elevate. ISBN 9781496446008.

=== Chapters ===
- ——— (2008). "Jesus as mamzer ("illegitimate son")". In ———; Modica, Joseph B. (eds.). Who do my Opponents Say I Am?: an investigation of the accusations against Jesus. Library of New Testament Studies. Vol. 327. London: T & T Clark. pp. 133–63. ISBN 978-0-567-03126-6. OCLC 170035734.

=== Articles ===
- ——— (1990). "James 2:18a: The Unidentifiable Interlocutor". Westminster Theological Journal. 52 (2): 355–364.
- ——— (1992). "The Warning Passages of Hebrews: A Formal Analysis and Theological Conclusions". Trinity Journal. 13 (1): 21–59.
