= James Dunn (theologian) =

British New Testament scholar and theologian (1939-2020)

James Dunn FBA
- Born: James Douglas Grant Dunn; 21 October 1939; Birmingham, England
- Died: 26 June 2020 (aged 80); Chichester, West Sussex, England
- Other name: Jimmy Dunn
- Known for: New Perspective on Paul

Academic background
- Education: University of Glasgow; Clare College, Cambridge
- Thesis: The Baptism in the Holy Spirit (1968)
- Doctoral advisor: C. F. D. Moule
- Influences: E. P. Sanders

Academic work
- Discipline: Biblical studies
- Sub-discipline: New Testament studies; Pauline studies
- Institutions: University of Durham
- Doctoral students: Helen Bond; Emmanuel Chinwokwu; Simon J. Gathercole; James F. McGrath; Scot McKnight; B. J. Oropeza; Ken Schenck; Graham Twelftree
- Notable works: The New Perspective on Paul (2007)
- Influenced: Scot McKnight; N. T. Wright

James Douglas Grant Dunn FBA (21 October 1939 – 26 June 2020), also known as Jimmy Dunn, was a British New Testament scholar, who was from 1990 until his retirement in 2003 the Lightfoot Professor of Divinity in the Department of Theology at the University of Durham. He is best known for his work on the New Perspective on Paul, which is also the title of a book he published in 2007. Dunn's 1982 Manson Memorial Lecture, "The New Perspective on Paul", gave the movement its name, and his three-volume Christianity in the Making (2003–2015) retold the story of Christian origins from Jesus onwards.

He worked broadly within the Methodist tradition and was a member of the Church of Scotland and the Methodist Church of Great Britain during his life.

== Biography ==
Dunn was born on 21 October 1939 in Birmingham, England.

He had the following degrees:

- Bachelor of Science (BSc) in economics and statistics at University of Glasgow, second class honours, 1961.
- Bachelor of Divinity (BD) at University of Glasgow, 1964, with distinction.
- Doctor of Philosophy (PhD) at University of Cambridge, 1968.
- Bachelor of Divinity (BD) at University of Cambridge, 1976.

He was awarded a Doctor of Divinity (DD) by the University of Cambridge in 1991. Dunn was licensed as a minister of the Church of Scotland in 1964. He was chaplain to overseas students at Edinburgh University in 1968–70.

In 1970, Dunn became a lecturer in divinity at the University of Nottingham, and was promoted to reader in 1979. While at Nottingham, he served as a Methodist local preacher.

He became Professor of Divinity at Durham University in 1982, and in 1990 became Lightfoot Professor of Divinity at Durham. He retired in 2003, and was succeeded as Lightfoot Professor of Divinity by John M. G. Barclay.

Dunn was president of the Studiorum Novi Testamenti Societas in 2002–2003. His presidential address, "Altering the Default Setting", was delivered at the society's meeting at Durham in August 2002 and examined the early transmission of the Jesus tradition. Only three other British scholars had been made President of the body in the preceding 25 years. In 2006 he became a Fellow of the British Academy.

A Festschrift in his honour, The Holy Spirit and Christian Origins, was published in 2004. In 2009 another Festschrift was dedicated to Dunn for his 70th birthday, consisting of two forewords by N. T. Wright and Richard B. Hays and 17 articles all written by his former students who went on to have successful careers in either academic and ministerial fields around the world.

Dunn was especially associated with the New Perspective on Paul, along with N. T. Wright, Krister Stendahl, and E. P. Sanders.

Dunn took up Sanders' project of redefining Palestinian Judaism in order to correct the Christian view of Judaism as a religion of works-righteousness. In his Parting of the Ways, Dunn highlighted four pillars of first-century Judaism as monotheism, election and land, Torah and Temple. One of the most important differences from Sanders is that Dunn perceives a fundamental coherence and consistency to Paul's thought. He furthermore criticizes Sanders' understanding of the term justification, arguing that Sanders' understanding suffers from an "individualizing exegesis".

Dunn also played an important role in Pentecostal-non-Pentecostal dialogue. His doctoral dissertation on Pentecostalism was later published as the influential Baptism in the Holy Spirit in 1970. Pentecostals' response to Dunn provided an entry point for Pentecostalism in academia and formed the genesis of Pentecostal scholarship. Dunn provides the greatest intellectual conversation partner for Pentecostal scholarship to this day and his work continues to serve as a spokesman for non-Pentecostal viewpoints on the Day of Pentecost in academia and for evangelical community at large.

Dunn also studied the origins of Christianity with special consideration for the oral traditions of early Christian communities, as well as with social memory theory.

In 1963 Dunn married Meta Russell, who survived him and died in 2021.

== Scholarship ==
=== The New Perspective on Paul ===
In November 1982, a month after taking up the Durham chair, Dunn delivered the Manson Memorial Lecture at the University of Manchester. The lecture was published in 1983 as "The New Perspective on Paul", and it gave the movement its name.

Dunn argued that when Paul criticised "works of the law", his target was not Jewish legalism or a religion of merit. His target was the use of the law's distinctive practices, above all circumcision and the food laws, as identity and boundary markers that marked Israel out from the Gentiles. On this reading, Paul's objection was to the law functioning as an ethnic barrier, not to the law itself. He developed the case across two decades of essays, collected as The New Perspective on Paul: Collected Essays in 2005.

The proposal reshaped the scholarly debate about Paul and Judaism, and it drew sustained criticism. The fullest book-length response was Stephen Westerholm's Perspectives Old and New on Paul (2004), which defended the traditional reading of Paul against Dunn and E. P. Sanders.

== Works ==
Dunn wrote or edited fifty books and numerous papers, including:

=== Books ===
- Dunn, James D. G. (1970). Baptism in the Holy Spirit. Studies in Biblical Theology Second Series. Vol. 15. London: SCM Press.
- ——— (1975). Jesus and the Spirit. London: SCM Press.
- ——— (1985). The Evidence for Jesus. Philadelphia, PA: Westminster Press. ISBN 978-0-664-24698-3.
- ——— (1980). Christology in the making: a New Testament inquiry into the origins of the doctrine of the incarnation. Philadelphia, PA: Westminster Press. ISBN 0-664-24356-8.
- ———, ed. (1986). The Kingdom of God and North East England. London: SCM Press. ISBN 0334008379.
- ——— (1988). Romans 1-8, 9-16. Waco, TX: Word Books. ISBN 0-8499-0252-5.
- ——— (1990). Jesus, Paul, and the Law: studies in Mark and Galatians. Louisville, KY: Westminster John Knox Press. ISBN 0-664-25095-5.
- ——— (1990). Unity and diversity in the New Testament: an inquiry into the character of earliest Christianity. London: SCM Press. ISBN 0-334-02436-6. (first published 1977)
- ——— (1991). The Partings of the Ways between Christianity and Judaism and their Significance for the Character of Christianity. London: SCM Press. ISBN 0-334-02508-7.
- ——— (1993). The Epistle to Galatians. Peabody, Mass: Hendrickson Publishers. ISBN 1-56563-036-X.
- ——— (1993). Paul for Today. The Ethel M. Wood Lecture, 10 March 1993. London: University of London. ISBN 9780718711061. OCLC 877271473.
- ———; Suggate, Alan M. (1994). The justice of God: a fresh look at the old doctrine of justification by faith. Grand Rapids, MI: Eerdmans. ISBN 0-8028-0797-6.
- ——— (1996). The Epistles to the Colossians and to Philemon: a commentary on the Greek text. Grand Rapids, MI: Eerdmans. ISBN 0-8028-2441-2.
- ——— (1996). The Acts of the Apostles. Valley Forge, PA: Trinity Press International. ISBN 9781563381928. OCLC 36519627.
- ——— (1998). The Theology of Paul the Apostle. Grand Rapids, MI: Eerdmans. ISBN 0-8028-3844-8.
- ———, ed. (2003). The Cambridge companion to St. Paul. Cambridge, UK: Cambridge University Press. ISBN 0-521-78694-0.
- ———; Rogerson, John W., eds. (2003). Eerdmans Commentary on the Bible. Grand Rapids, MI: Eerdmans. ISBN 0-8028-3711-5.
- ——— (2003). Christianity in the Making: Vol. 1, Jesus Remembered. Grand Rapids, MI: Eerdmans. ISBN 0-8028-3931-2.
- ——— (2005). A New Perspective On Jesus: What The Quest For The Historical Jesus Missed. Acadia Studies in Bible and Theology. Grand Rapids, MI: Baker Academic. ISBN 0-8010-2710-1.
- ——— (2005). The New Perspective on Paul: Collected Essays. Tübingen: Mohr Siebeck. ISBN 3-16-148677-3.
- ——— (2007). The New Perspective On Paul. Grand Rapids, MI: Eerdmans. ISBN 978-0-8028-4562-7.
- ——— (2009). Christianity in the Making: Vol. 2, Beginning from Jerusalem. Grand Rapids, MI: Eerdmans. ISBN 978-0-8028-3932-9.
- ——— (2009). The Living Word (second ed.). Minneapolis, MN: Fortress Press. ISBN 978-0-8006-6355-1.
- ——— (2010). Did the first Christians worship Jesus?. London - Louisville, KY: Society for promoting Christian knowledge. ISBN 978-0-281-05928-7.
- ——— (2011). Jesus, Paul, and the Gospels. Grand Rapids, MI: Eerdmans. ISBN 978-0-8028-6645-5.
- ——— (2013). The Oral Gospel Tradition. Grand Rapids, MI: Eerdmans. ISBN 978-0-8028-6782-7.
- ——— (2015). Christianity in the Making: Vol. 3, Neither Jew nor Greek: A Contested Identity. Grand Rapids, MI: Eerdmans. ISBN 978-0-8028-3933-6.
- ——— (2019). Jesus according to the New Testament. Grand Rapids, MI: Eerdmans. ISBN 978-0-8028-7669-0.

=== Chapters ===
- ——— (1974). "Paul's Understanding of the Death of Jesus". In Banks, Robert J. (ed.). Reconciliation and Hope. New Testament Essays on Atonement and Eschatology Presented to L.L. Morris on his 60th Birthday. Carlisle, UK: The Paternoster Press. pp. 125–141.
- ——— (1977). "Demythologising - The Problem of Myth in the New Testament". In Marshall, I. Howard (ed.). New Testament Interpretation: Essays on Principles and Methods. Carlisle, UK: The Paternoster Press. pp. 285–307. ISBN 0853644241.

=== Journal articles ===
- ——— (July 1979). "'They believed Philip preaching' (Acts 8:12): a Reply". Irish Biblical Studies. 1 (3): 177–183.
- ——— (January 1981). "Demythologizing the Ascension - A Reply to Professor Gooding". Irish Biblical Studies. 3 (1): 15–27.
- ——— (1983). "The New Perspective on Paul". Bulletin of the John Rylands Library. 65 (2): 95–122. doi:10.7227/BJRL.65.2.6.
- ——— (1985). "Works of the Law and the Curse of the Law (Galatians 3.10–14)". New Testament Studies. 31 (4): 523–542. doi:10.1017/S0028688500012066.
- ——— (2003). "Altering the Default Setting: Re-envisaging the Early Transmission of the Jesus Tradition". New Testament Studies. 49 (2): 139–175. doi:10.1017/S0028688503000080.

Professional and academic associations
Preceded by Tjitze Baarda	President of the Studiorum; Novi Testamenti Societas; 2002	Succeeded by Hans-Josef Klauck
