= Trinity Journal (journal) =

- Discipline: Theology, biblical studies
- Language: English
- Edited by: Dana Harris

Publication details
- History: 1980–present
- Publisher: Trinity Evangelical Divinity School
- Frequency: Biannually

Standard abbreviations
- ISO 4: Trinity J.

Indexing
- ISSN: 0360-3032
- OCLC no.: 2243858

Links
- Journal homepage

Trinity Journal is a biannual peer-reviewed academic journal. It was established in 1980 and is published by Trinity Evangelical Divinity School.
