= I. Howard Marshall =

Scottish New Testament scholar (1934–2015)

- Born: Ian Howard Marshall; 12 January 1934; Scotland
- Died: 12 December 2015 (aged 81)
- Title: Emeritus Professor of New Testament Exegesis and Honorary Research Professor at the University of Aberdeen
- Board member of: Chair of the Tyndale Fellowship for Biblical and Theological Research
- Spouse: Maureen Wing Sheung Yeung

Academic background
- Education: Cambridge, Asbury University
- Alma mater: University of Aberdeen (Ph.D.)

Academic work
- Discipline: Biblical studies
- Sub-discipline: New Testament studies
- Institutions: University of Aberdeen
- Notable works: New Testament Interpretation, Luke: Historian and Theologian & The Gospel of Luke (NIGTC)

Ian Howard Marshall (12 January 1934 – 12 December 2015) was a Scottish New Testament scholar. He was Professor of New Testament Exegesis at the University of Aberdeen, Scotland. He was formerly the chair of the Tyndale Fellowship for Biblical and Theological Research; he was also president of the British New Testament Society and chair of the Fellowship of European Evangelical Theologians. Marshall identified as an Evangelical Methodist. He was the author of numerous publications, including the 2005 Gold Medallion Book Award winner New Testament Theology.

== Biography ==
=== Personal life ===
Marshall was born on 12 January 1934. He was the son of Ernest Ewart Marshall and Ethel Marshall (née Curran). Marshall married Joyce Elizabeth Proudfoot in 1961 and had four children. She died in 1996. In 2011, Marshall married Dr. Maureen Wing Sheung Yeung, former president of Evangel Seminary, Hong Kong. Marshall died of pancreatic cancer in 2015.

=== Education ===
- DD, Asbury University
- MA, BD, & PhD, University of Aberdeen
- BA, Cambridge

=== Career ===
He was Professor Emeritus of New Testament Exegesis since 1964 and Honorary Research Professor at the University of Aberdeen, Scotland. He was formerly the chair of the Tyndale Fellowship for Biblical and Theological Research. He was the author of at least 38 books and more than 120 essays and articles.

== Academic interests ==
Marshall's main interests in research were the Gospel of Luke and the Acts of the Apostles, the Pastoral Epistles, and aspects of New Testament theology. He was particularly concerned with the work of Luke as both historian and theologian. He contributed to a New Testament introduction for students and edited a revision and updating of Moulton and Geden's Concordance to the Greek Testament so that it could be used with the current major editions of the Greek New Testament as well as with older editions. In 2005 his New Testament Theology was the Gold Medallion Book Award winner.

Marshall was a critic of the Christ myth theory. In his book I Believe in the Historical Jesus he wrote that the idea that Jesus never existed has "failed to make any impression on scholarly opinion." His contribution to the UK television miniseries Jesus: The Evidence (Channel 4: 1984) was pitted against that of mythicist G. A. Wells, prompting Henry Chadwick, Regius Professor of Divinity at Cambridge University, to comment that the programmes "juxtaposed perfectly sensible scholarly opinions with opinions so outré and hard to defend on rational grounds that disservice was done to the sensible people by the company they were portrayed as keeping."

Marshall had an Arminian theology. With Arminius, he believed that unlimited atonement is consistent with penal substitution. In Kept by the Power of God (1969), Marshall mentioned the possibility of apostasy. He preferred the view of conditional security for having fewer exegetical difficulties, a point that was added eventually in an epilogue of Kept by the Power of God (1995).

== Publications ==
- Marshall, I. Howard (1968). Bible Study Books - St. Mark. London: Scripture Union.
- Marshall, I. Howard (1969). Kept by the power of God : a study of perseverance and falling away. London: Epworth Publishing.
- Marshall, I. Howard (1970). Luke: Historian and Theologian. Exeter: Paternoster Press.
- Marshall, I. Howard (1976). The Origins of New Testament Christology. Illinois: Intervarsity Press.
- Marshall, I. Howard (1977). New Testament Interpretation. Exeter: Paternoster Press.
- Marshall, I. Howard (1978). The Gospel of Luke (NIGTC). Exeter: Paternoster Press.
- Marshall, I. Howard (1977). I Believe in the Historical Jesus. London: Hodder & Stoughton.
- Marshall, I. Howard (1978). The Epistles of John (NICNT). Grand Rapids: Eerdmans.
- Marshall, I. Howard (1980). The Acts of the Apostles. Leicester: IVP.
- Marshall, I. Howard (1980). Last Supper and Lord's Supper. Exeter: Paternoster Press.
- Marshall, I. Howard (1982). Biblical Inspiration. London: Hodder and Stoughton.
- Marshall, I. Howard (1983). 1 and 2 Thessalonians (NCB). Grand Rapids: Eerdmans.
- Marshall, I. Howard (1990). Jesus the Saviour: Studies in New Testament Theology. London: SPCK.
- Marshall, I. Howard (1991). 1 Peter (IVP Commentary Series). Leicester: IVP.
- Marshall, I. Howard (1992). The Epistle to the Philippians. London: Epworth Press.
- Marshall, I. Howard (1993). The Theology of the Shorter Pauline Letters. Cambridge: Cambridge University Press.
- Marshall, I. Howard; Peterson, D. (1998). Witness to the Gospel: The Theology of the Book of Acts. Grand Rapids: Eerdmans.
- Marshall, I. Howard; Towner, Philip H. (1999). A Critical and Exegetical Commentary on The Pastoral Epistles. Edinburgh: T&T Clark.
- Marshall, I. Howard (2002). Concordance to the Greek New Testament. London: T&T Clark.
- Marshall, I. Howard; Travis, Stephen; Paul, Ian (2002). Exploring the New Testament. Vol. 2. London: SPCK.
- Marshall, I. Howard; Vanhoozer, Kevin J.; Porter, Stanley E. (2004). Beyond the Bible: Moving from Scripture to Theology. Grand Rapids: Baker Academic.
- Marshall, I. Howard (2004). New Testament Theology: Many Witnesses, One Gospel. Downers Grove: Inter-Varsity Press.
- Marshall, I. Howard (2007). Aspects of Atonement. London: Paternoster Press.

== Notes and references ==
=== Sources ===
- Bock, Darrell (2015). "I. Howard Marshall (1934-2015): A Tribute". The Gospel Coalition. Evangelical Christian Publishers Association.
- ECPA (2019). "2005 Gold Medallion Book Award Winners". Christian Book Expo. Evangelical Christian Publishers Association.
- Evangel Seminary (2019). "播神歷史及歷任院長". Evangel Seminary (in Chinese (Hong Kong)). Archived from the original on 18 September 2021.
- Perkins, Robert L.; Marshall, I. Howard (1987). "The Problem of Apostasy in New Testament Theology" (PDF). Perspectives on Scripture and tradition : essays in honor of Dale Moody. Macon, Ga: Mercer University Press.
- Marshall, I. Howard (2001) [1st pub. Hodder & Stoughton: 1977]. I Believe in the Historical Jesus. Vancouver: Regent College Publishing. ISBN 9781573830195.
- Marshall, I. Howard (2005). "The Theology of the Atonement" (PDF). London School of Theology.
- Oropeza, B. J. (2000). Paul and Apostasy: Eschatology, Perseverance, and Falling Away in the Corinthian Congregation. Tübingen: Mohr Siebeck.
- Oxford University Press (2019). Marshall, Prof. (Ian) Howard. Oxford University Press. doi:10.1093/ww/9780199540884.013.U246145.
- Wallis, Richard (2016). "Channel 4 and the declining influence of organized religion on UK television. The case of Jesus: The Evidence". Historical Journal of Film, Radio and Television. 36 (4): 668–688. doi:10.1080/01439685.2015.1132821.
