= John Jefferson Davis =

American academic

- Education: Duke University, B.A.; Gordon-Conwell Theological Seminary, M.Div.; Duke University, Ph.D.
- Occupation(s): Professor, Theologian, Author, Minister
- Spouse: Robin
- Theological work
- Tradition or movement: Evangelical, Reformed, Presbyterian
- Main interests: Practice of worship and liturgy, the relationship between faith and science, pneumatology, Trinitarian theology
- Notable ideas: Christian Egalitarianism, Just War, Environmental Ethics, Biblical Ethics

John Jefferson Davis is Professor of Systematic Theology and Christian Ethics at Gordon-Conwell Theological Seminary, where he has taught since 1975. He is an ordained Presbyterian pastor (Presbyterian Church USA).

== Scholarship ==
Davis has been actively publishing in ethics and systematic theology for nearly three decades. His most influential debates involve women's ordination and Christian Egalitarianism. Davis has also taken part in a popular debate with John Sanders over Open Theism. Davis served as the president of the Evangelical Philosophical Society from 1980 to 1981.

== Works ==
=== Books ===
- Davis, John Jefferson, ed. (1978). The Necessity of Systematic Theology (2nd ed.). Grand Rapids, MI: Baker Book House. ISBN 978-0-801-02903-5. OCLC 10412074.
- ——— (1981). Theology Primer: Resources for the Theological Student. Grand Rapids, MI: Baker Book House. ISBN 978-0-801-02912-7. OCLC 7918017.
- ——— (1984). Foundations of Evangelical Theology. Grand Rapids, MI: Baker Book House. ISBN 978-0-801-02937-0. OCLC 10595917.
- ——— (1984). Abortion and the Christian: what every believer should know. Phillipsburg, NJ: Presbyterian and Reformed Pub. Co. ISBN 978-0-875-52221-0. OCLC 10696195.
- ——— (1984). Handbook of Basic Bible Texts: every key passage for the study of doctrine and theology. Grand Rapids, MI: Zondervan. ISBN 978-0-310-43711-6. OCLC 10162743.
- ——— (1984). Your Wealth in God's World: does the Bible support the free market?. Phillipsburg, NJ: Presbyterian and Reformed Pub. Co. ISBN 978-0-875-52219-7. OCLC 9919698.
- ——— (1985). Evangelical Ethics: Issues Facing the Church Today (1st ed.). Phillipsburg, NJ: Presbyterian and Reformed Pub. Co. ISBN 978-0-875-52222-7. OCLC 247949288.
- ——— (1985). Let the Bible Teach you Christian Doctrine. Exeter, Devon: Paternoster Press. ISBN 978-0-853-64407-1. OCLC 12509019.
- ——— (1986). Christ's Victorious Kingdom: postmillennialism reconsidered. Grand Rapids, MI: Baker Book House. ISBN 978-0-801-02970-7. OCLC 15343949.
- ——— (1986). The Christian's Guide to Pregnancy & Childbirth: choosing the best for you & your baby from conception to delivery. Westchester, IL: Crossway Books. ISBN 978-0-891-07391-8. OCLC 15489346.
- ——— (2002). The Frontiers of Science & Faith: Examining Questions from the Big Bang to the End of the Universe. Downers Grove, IL: InterVarsity Press. ISBN 978-0-830-82664-3. OCLC 48474368.
- ——— (2010). Worship and the Reality of God: An Evangelical Theology of Real Presence. Downers Grove, IL: IVP Academic. ISBN 978-0-830-83884-4. OCLC 624042044.
- ——— (2012). Meditation and Communion with God: Contemplating Scripture in an Age of Distraction. Downers Grove, IL: IVP Academic. ISBN 978-0-830-83976-6. OCLC 778417018.
- ——— (2015). Practicing Ministry in the Presence of God: theological reflections on ministry and the Christian life. Eugene, OR: Cascade Books. ISBN 9781498202053. OCLC 914326283.
- ——— (2015). Evangelical Ethics: Issues Facing the Church Today (5th ed.). Phillipsburg, NJ: Presbyterian and Reformed Pub. Co. ISBN 978-1-629-95218-5. OCLC 913829576.

=== Chapters ===
- ——— (1978). "Contextualization and the Nature of Theology". In Davis, John Jefferson (ed.). The Necessity of Systematic Theology (2nd ed.). Grand Rapids, MI: Baker Book House. pp. 169–90. ISBN 978-0-801-02903-5. OCLC 10412074.
- ——— (1980). "Genesis, Inerrancy, and the Antiquity of Man". In Nicole, Roger R.; Michaels, J. Ramsey (eds.). Inerrancy and Common Sense. Grand Rapids, MI: Baker Book House. ISBN 978-0-801-06733-4. OCLC 6173523.
- ——— (2015). "Slow Discipleship and the End of Christendom". In Hansen, Colin (ed.). Revisiting 'Faithful Presence': To Change the World Five Years Later. The Gospel Coalition. - ebook only
