= Vernon Grounds =

American theologian and academic (1914 - 2010)

Vernon Charles Grounds
- Born: July 19, 1914; Jersey City, New Jersey, US
- Died: September 12, 2010 (aged 96); Wichita, Kansas, US
- Education: Rutgers University, Faith Theological Seminary, Drew University
- Occupations: Seminary President, Theologian and writer
- Movement: American evangelism
- Parent(s): John and Bertha Grounds

Vernon Charles Grounds (July 19, 1914 – September 12, 2010) was an American theologian, Christian educator, Chancellor of Denver Seminary, and one of the leaders in the development of American evangelicalism.

== Early life and education ==
Grounds was born July 19, 1914, in Jersey City, New Jersey, the youngest of three children born to John and Bertha Grounds. He studied at Rutgers University and graduated with a Bachelor of Arts in 1937, then studied theology at Faith Theological Seminary in Wilmington, Delaware and obtained a Bachelor of Divinity. He was part of a group that included notable evangelical leaders such as Arthur Glasser, Kenneth Kantzer, Joseph Bayly, and Francis Schaeffer. On June 17, 1939, Grounds married Ann Barton, with whom he had one child, a daughter, as well as three grandchildren. He also studied at Drew University and received a doctorate in 1960.

== Academic career ==
While pursuing his degrees, Grounds served as pastor at the Gospel Tabernacle in Paterson, New Jersey from 1934 until 1945. During this time, he also taught at the American Seminary of the Bible in Wayne, New Jersey, the Hawthorne Evening Bible School, and King's College (then in Belmar, New Jersey). His full-time teaching career began in 1945, when he became dean and professor of theology and apologetics at Baptist Bible College & Seminary in Johnson City, New York. He served there until 1951, when he moved to Denver to become academic dean at the Conservative Baptist Theological Seminary. He later served as president from 1956 until retiring in 1979. Grounds continued in a teaching and counseling role as president emeritus, and was named chancellor in 1993, where he actively served until his death.

== Legacy and death ==
In 1963, Grounds served a term as president of the Evangelical Theological Society. A festschrift honoring Grounds, titled Christian Freedom, edited by Stanley Grenz and Kenneth Wozniak, was published in 1986. His biography, titled Transformed by Love: The Vernon Grounds Story, written by Bruce L. Shelley was published in 2003. Grounds was also awarded honorary degrees from Wheaton College and Gordon College. He died September 12, 2010, at a nursing facility in Wichita, Kansas. Upon his death, George W. Truett Theological Seminary professor and Patheos blogger Roger E. Olson memorialized Grounds as "a model post-fundamentalist, centrist evangelical".

== Publications ==
Grounds was the author of five books, including:

- The Reason for Our Hope (1945)
- Evangelicalism and Social Responsibility (1969) ISBN 0836116011
- Revolution and the Christian Faith: An Evangelical Perspective (1971) ISBN 1556353758
- Emotional Problems and the Gospel (1976) ISBN 031025311X
- Radical commitment: getting serious about Christian growth (1984) ISBN 0880700513; later republished as YBH - Yes, but how? (1998) ISBN 0929239504

Grounds was also a contributing editor for Christianity Today and wrote more than 500 articles for Our Daily Bread from 1993 until 2009.
