= Donald Fairbairn =

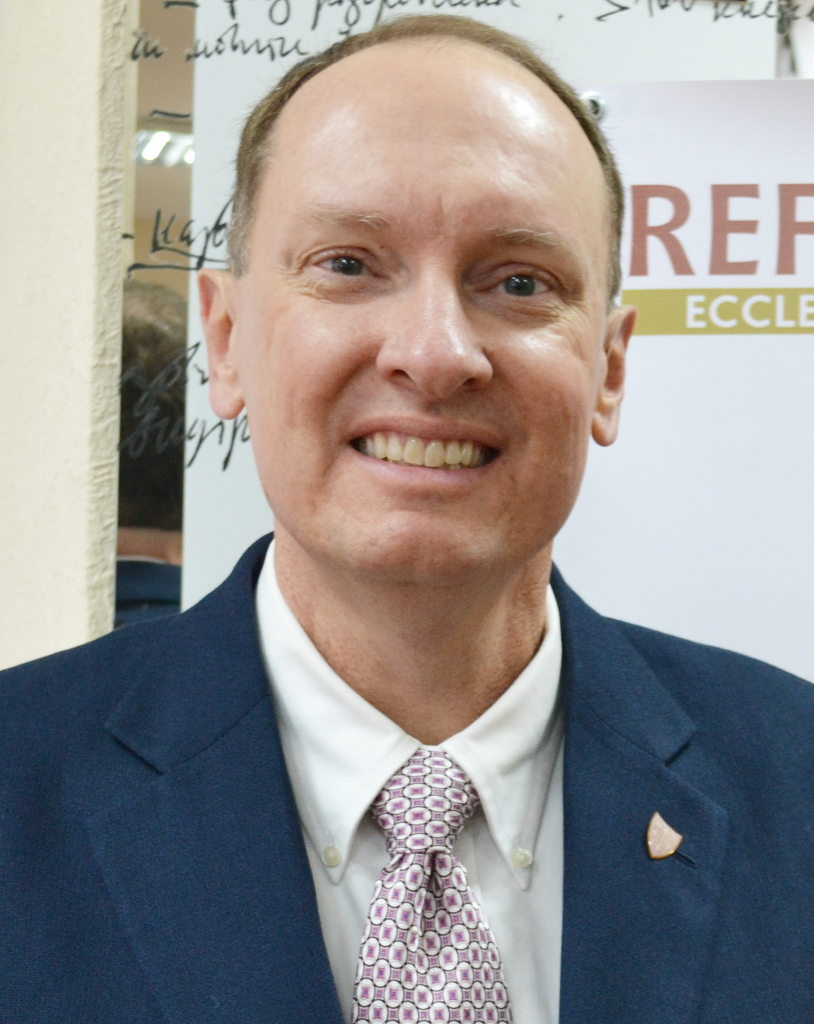
- Born: Donald MacAllister Fairbairn, Jr; August 31, 1963 (age 63)
- Occupations: Professor; Theologian; Historian
- Title: Robert E. Cooley Professor of Early Christianity
- Spouse: Jennifer Katona
- Children: Donald III, Anna

Academic background
- Education: Princeton University, 1985: A.B. in English Literature; Denver Seminary, 1989: M.Div
- Alma mater: University of Cambridge, 1999: Ph.D. in patristics

Donald Fairbairn (born August 31, 1963) is a scholar specializing in patristic soteriology and Cyril of Alexandria who currently teaches at Gordon-Conwell Theological Seminary.

== Education ==
Fairbairn graduated summa cum laude from Princeton University with an A.B. in English literature. During his time at Princeton he was awarded the "Class of 1859 Prize" which was awarded to the student in the English department with the highest graduating GPA. He then began an M.Div program at Erskine Theological Seminary in Due West, South Carolina where he was awarded the Kenneth Fitzhugh Morris Award for excellence in Biblical studies. After two years of study at Erskine he transferred to Denver Seminary where he graduated with honors, having been awarded the Scholarship Award for being the M.Div graduate with the highest GPA. In 1999 Fairbairn was awarded the Ph.D. in Patristics from the University of Cambridge, where he completed a dissertation titled Grace and Christology in Cyril of Alexandria and John Cassian under Lionel Wickham.

== Teaching career ==
Despite being nearly completely deaf, Fairbairn has taught at various institutions, including adjunct roles at the Cambridge Summer School of Theology, Denver Seminary, the Greek Biblce Institute, Haddington House, IFES Eurasia, North Caucaus Bible College, the REALIS Institute in Kyiv and Union School of Theology. While still a PhD student at Cambridge he was teaching multiple courses and provided academic leadership at Donetsk Christian University in Donetsk (Ukraine), during the institution's formative years, and he continued there as a visiting professor of theology later on. He also teaches part-time as a professor of Historical Theology at Evangelische Theologische Faculteit in Leuven. He is currently the Robert E. Cooley Professor of Early Christianity at Gordon-Conwell Theological Seminary in Charlotte, North Carolina (where he also serves as the Academic Dean) and previously taught full-time at Erskine Theological Seminary.
