= James Luther Adams =

American theologian and minister

- Adams at Harvard in 1956
- Born: November 12, 1901; Ritzville, Washington, US
- Died: July 26, 1994 (aged 92); Cambridge, Massachusetts, US
- Spouse: Margaret Ann Young (m. 1927; died 1978)

Academic background
- Education: University of Minnesota; Harvard University; University of Chicago
- Thesis: Paul Tillich's Philosophy of Culture, Science, and Religion (1945)
- Influences: Irving Babbitt; Friedrich von Hügel; Francis Greenwood Peabody; Willard L. Sperry; Paul Tillich; Ernst Troeltsch; Alfred North Whitehead

Academic work
- Discipline: Theology
- School or tradition: Theological liberalism
- Institutions: Meadville Theological School; Harvard University; Andover Newton Theological School
- Doctoral students: Harvey Cox; Stephen Charles Mott
- Influenced: Beverly Wildung Harrison; Chris Hedges; George Huntston Williams

Ecclesiastical career
- Religion: Unitarian Universalism
- Church: Unitarian Universalist Association
- Ordained: 1927

James Luther Adams (November 12, 1901 – July 26, 1994), was an American professor at Harvard Divinity School, Andover Newton Theological School, and Meadville Lombard Theological School, and a Unitarian parish minister. He was among the most influential theologian among American Unitarian Universalists in the 20th century.

== Biography ==
Adams was born on November 12, 1901, in Ritzville, Washington, the son of James Carey Adams, a farmer and itinerant Plymouth Brethren preacher. In his family and in church, the Day of Judgment was constantly considered a very real possibility. When Adams was 16, his father became extremely ill, and Adams left school to work on the Northern Pacific Railroad to help support the family. He did well there and rose in management but dropped from this job to attend the University of Minnesota. After he graduated in 1924, he went on to the Harvard Divinity School to become a Unitarian minister. In his education, he moved from "premillenarian fundamentalism" to "scientific humanism" and then to liberal Christianity.

After graduation from Harvard, Adams served as minister of the Second Church, Unitarian in Salem, Massachusetts, from 1927 to 1934, and the First Unitarian Society in Wellesley Hills, Massachusetts, from 1934 to 1935. In the mid-1930s, Adams spent considerable time in Germany, where he befriended several notable religious figures (including Karl Barth and Albert Schweitzer) who were active in clandestine resistance to the rise of Nazism.

In 1937, Adams began a long career in academia by joining the faculty of Meadville Theological School (now Meadville Lombard Theological School) in Chicago. While there, he became a member of the First Unitarian Church of Chicago and served on its board of trustees. In 1956, he became Professor of Christian Ethics at Harvard Divinity School, where he stayed until he retired in 1968. He was elected a Fellow of the American Academy of Arts and Sciences in 1958. In 1962 he became part of the first board of directors for the Society for the Arts, Religion and Contemporary Culture. A number of his students later became influential figures in Christian ethics across the theological spectrum. Among them was Stephen Charles Mott, a pioneer in evangelical social ethics in the US who taught at Gordon-Conwell Theological Seminary for a quarter of a century and former President of the James Luther Adams Foundation. Another one of Adams's students was Chris Hedges, author of War Is a Force That Gives Us Meaning (2002). After his retirement from Harvard, Adams taught at Andover Newton Theological School and Meadville Lombard Theological School. In his later years, he lived in Harvard Square, Cambridge adjacent to the Harvard Divinity School near the Harvard University campus and was an active member of Arlington Street Church (UU) in Boston until his death on July 26, 1994. He is buried at Cambridge Cemetery, Cambridge, Massachusetts.
