= Alice Palmer Mathews =

American academic

- Born: Alice Lorraine Palmer; July 20, 1930 (age 96); New York City, New York, U.S.
- Education: University of Denver / Iliff School of Theology (Ph.D., 1996)
- Occupations: Professor, author, radio host
- Spouse: Randall K. Mathews (m. 1951)

Alice Palmer Mathews (born July 20, 1930) is an American sociologist, author, and radio host known for her scholarship on women's roles in the Christian church. She is the Lois E. Bennett Distinguished Associate Professor Emerita of Educational Ministries and Women's Ministries at Gordon-Conwell Theological Seminary. Her papers are held in the Alice Mathews Collection at Baylor University.

== Education ==
Alice Mathews was born on July 20, 1930 in New York City and was raised in Detroit, Michigan. Mathews earned a Doctor of Philosophy in Religion and Social Change from the University of Denver jointly with the Iliff School of Theology in 1996. She holds a Master of Arts in Clinical Psychology from Michigan State University (1970), a Diplôme in French language and literature from the University of Paris (1965), and a Bachelor of Arts from Bob Jones University (1951).

== Career ==
Mathews served as Academic Dean at Gordon-Conwell Theological Seminary and as associate director for the Doctor of Ministry program. She was the Lois W. Bennett Distinguished Associate Professor of Educational Ministries and Women's Ministries. Earlier in her career, she was Dean of the Philadelphia Center at Seminary of the East.

From 1991 to 2013, Mathews co-hosted the daily radio program Discover the Word (originally Radio Bible Class) alongside Haddon Robinson and Mart DeHaan of RBC Ministries. The program aired on several hundred Christian radio stations.

Mathews and her husband Randall served as missionaries in Paris, France and in Vienna, Austria.

In February 2006, Mathews delivered the W. H. Griffith Thomas Memorial Lectures at Dallas Theological Seminary, becoming the first woman to deliver these lectures since their establishment in 1927.

== Selected publications ==
- A Woman God Can Use (Discovery House Publishers, 1990) ISBN 978-0929239309
- A Woman Jesus Can Teach (Discovery House Publishers, 1991) ISBN 978-0929239446
- Preaching That Speaks to Women (Baker Academic, 2003) ISBN 978-0801023675 — Christianity Today 2004 Book Award winner
- Marriage Made in Eden (Wipf & Stock, 2006) ISBN 978-1606083895
- Gender Roles and the People of God: Rethinking What We Were Taught about Men and Women in the Church (Zondervan, 2017) ISBN 978-0310529392

== Personal life ==
Mathews married Randall K. Mathews in 1951.

== See also ==
- Christians for Biblical Equality
- Our Daily Bread Ministries
- Haddon Robinson
