= Stephen Charles Mott =

American theologian

- Born: April 9, 1940 (age 86)
- Occupation: Teacher

Academic background
- Education: Wheaton College, Illinois; Harvard University
- Doctoral advisor: Krister Stendahl
- Other advisor: James Luther Adams

Academic work
- Discipline: Social Ethics
- Institutions: United Methodist Church
- Notable works: Biblical Ethics and Social Change

Stephen Charles Mott (born April 9, 1940) is a teacher among Evangelical Christians in the U.S., focusing on the teaching and academic study of social ethics since the early 1970s.

== Education ==
He has a BD degree from Wheaton College, Illinois. He also received a Ph.D. degree from Harvard University, where he studied under New Testament scholar Krister Stendahl and social ethicist James Luther Adams.

== Professional career ==
He is an ordained minister in the United Methodist Church and served as Professor of Christian Social Ethics at Gordon-Conwell Theological Seminary in South Hamilton, Massachusetts for over 20 years. When he started teaching in the early 1970s, the courses he offered at Gordon-Conwell were unique across all evangelical theological schools in any English-speaking countries at the time.

In 1995 he left his teaching position and became pastor of Cochesett United Methodist Church in West Bridgewater, Massachusetts, from which he retired in summer 2005.

Since his retirement, he has served part-time as a volunteer with the Essex County Community Organization, as well as being part of the Leadership Team of Christians Supporting Community Organizing, president of the James Luther Adams Foundation, and on the Board of Directors of North Shore Community Action Programs.

== Other works ==
In 1973 he was one of the signatories of The Chicago Declaration of Evangelical Social Concern.

He served as president of the James Luther Adams Foundation until February 2022.

== Books ==
His most notable books are Biblical Ethics and Social Change (Oxford University Press, rev. ed. 2011 [1982]) and A Christian Perspective on Political Thought (Oxford University Press, 1993).

Biblical Ethics and Social Change has been used as a text in over 100 university courses.

== Personal life ==
Mott is a son of a church minister.

He was married to Dr. Sandy Mott, a professor in the School of Nursing of Boston College, until her death in 2021. They have three children.
