= Sean M. McDonough =

(American professor (born 1964)

- Born: 1964 (age 61–62)

Academic background
- Education: Harvard College; Gordon-Conwell Theological Seminary; University of St. Andrews
- Thesis: YHWH at Patmos Rev. 1:4 in its Hellenistic and early Jewish setting

Academic work
- Discipline: Biblical studies
- Institutions: Gordon-Conwell Theological Seminary; Pacific Theological College
- Main interests: New Testament

Sean M. McDonough (born in 1964) is an American professor of New Testament at Gordon-Conwell Theological Seminary in South Hamilton, Massachusetts, and Chair of the Biblical Studies Department at Pacific Theological College.

== Life ==
=== Education ===
McDonough earned a Bachelor of Arts at Harvard College. He also earned a Master of Divinity in 1993 and a Master of Theology in 1994 from the Gordon-Conwell Theological Seminary. From 1997, he holds a Doctor of Philosophy at the University of St. Andrews, with his doctoral dissertation YHWH at Patmos Rev. 1:4 in its Hellenistic and early Jewish setting.

=== Teaching ===
From 1997 to 2000 he taught at the Pacific Theological College in Suva, Fiji, where he served as Lecturer in New Testament. Since 2000, he has taught at Gordon-Conwell Theological Seminary in South Hamilton, Massachusetts, where he is associate professor of New Testament and the Chair of the Biblical Studies Department.

== Works ==
=== Books ===
- McDonough, Sean M. (1999). YHWH at Patmos: Rev. 1:4 in Its Hellenistic and Early Jewish Setting. Wissenschaftliche Untersuchungen zum Neuen Testament, ISSN 0340-9570. Mohr Siebeck. ISBN 9783161470554.
- McDonough, Sean M. (2009-12-03). Christ as Creator: Origins of a New Testament Doctrine. Oxford University Press. doi:10.1093/acprof:oso/9780199576470.001.0001. ISBN 9780199576470.

=== Articles ===
- McDonough, S. M. (2000). "Of beasts and bees: The view of the natural world in Virgil's Georgics and John's Apocalypse". New Testament Studies. 46 (2): 227–244. doi:10.1017/S002868850000014X. S2CID 170739755.
- McDonough, S. M. (2005). "Competent to judge: The Old Testament connection between 1 corinthians 5 and 6". Journal of Theological Studies. 56 (1): 99–102. doi:10.1093/jts/fli004.
- McDonough, S. M. (2006). "Small change: Saul to Paul, again". Journal of Biblical Literature. 125 (2): 390–391. doi:10.2307/27638366. JSTOR 27638366.

== Sources ==
- Bloomsbury Staff. "Sean M. McDonough". Bloomsbury Publishing Inc.
- Gordon-Conwell Theological Seminary. "« OUR FACULTY. Dr. Sean McDonough Professor of New Testament". Gordon-Conwell Theological Seminary.
- "Sean McDonough". Carl F. H. Henry Center for Theological Understanding.
- "McDonough, Sean M., 1964- (Personal Name)".
- Shaw, Frank E.; et al. (Brown University. Program in Judaic Studies) (2005). "The Emperor Gaius' Employment of the Divine Name". The Studia Philonica Annual. Brown Judaic studies, ISSN 0147-927X / The Studia Philonica Annual. Vol. 17. Scholars Press. p. 34. ISBN 9781930675247.
