= Mark Dever =

American theologian (born 1960)

Mark E. Dever
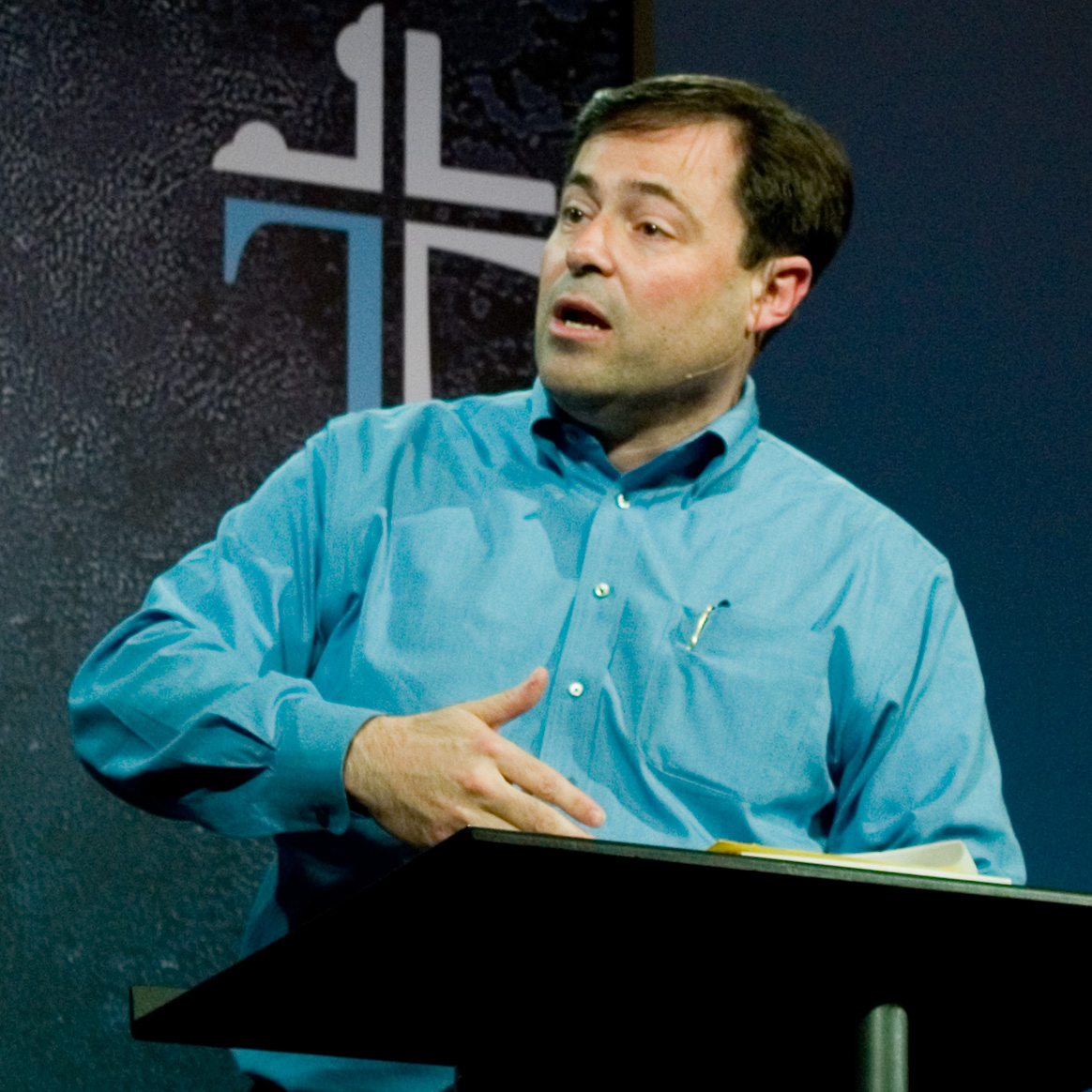
- Born: August 28, 1960 (age 66)
- Education: Duke University (B.A.); Gordon–Conwell Theological Seminary (M.Div.); Southern Baptist Theological Seminary (M.Th.); University of Cambridge (Ph.D.)
- Occupations: Pastor, theologian, writer
- Spouse: Connie Dever
- Children: Annie; Nathan
- Theological work
- Era: Late 20th and early 21st centuries
- Tradition or movement: Baptist Calvinism
- Main interests: Ecclesiastical History

Mark E. Dever (born August 28, 1960) is an American theologian and the senior pastor of the Capitol Hill Baptist Church in Washington, D.C., and president emeritus of 9Marks (formerly known as the Center for Church Reform), a Christian ministry he founded in 1998. Dever also taught for the faculty of Divinity at the University of Cambridge and also served for two years as an associate pastor of Eden Baptist Church in Cambridge.

== Biography ==
Dever grew up in rural Kentucky where he was an avid reader. He began reading sections of the World Book Encyclopedia and the Harvard Classics before he was ten years old and based upon his reading and thinking considered himself an agnostic in his younger years. Later rereading and thinking about the Gospels and the change that he saw in the life of Jesus' disciples led him to become a Christian.

Dever earned the degrees of Bachelor of Arts, magna cum laude, from Duke University, Master of Divinity, summa cum laude, from Gordon-Conwell Theological Seminary, Master of Theology from the Southern Baptist Theological Seminary, and Doctor of Philosophy in ecclesiastical history from Cambridge University and received J.B. Lightfoot Scholarship at Cambridge University from 1989 to 1991. Dever also taught for the faculty of Divinity at Cambridge University while serving for two years as an associate pastor of Eden Baptist Church.

Dever is married with two adult children.

== Capitol Hill Baptist Church ==
Capitol Hill Baptist Church is a Baptist church located on Capitol Hill in Washington, D.C., six blocks from the United States Capitol. Dever has been the senior pastor of the church since 1994. Capitol Hill Baptist is affiliated with the Southern Baptist Convention.

== Founding and development ==
In 1998, four years after becoming senior pastor at Capitol Hill Baptist Church, Dever founded 9Marks (originally called the Center for Church Reform). The ministry grew out of his conviction that many contemporary evangelical churches had neglected foundational biblical patterns for church life.

The foundation was set out in Dever's 2001 book Nine Marks of a Healthy Church, which identified nine characteristics he views as particularly neglected in modern evangelical practice:

1. Expositional preaching
2. Gospel doctrine
3. A biblical understanding of conversion and evangelism
4. Church membership
5. Church discipline
6. Discipleship and growth
7. Biblical church leadership
8. Prayer
9. Missions

=== Ecclesiology ===
Dever is a Baptist and a Calvinist. His church polity is notable for its emphasis on an elder led, congregationally ruled church. In addition, he believes that Baptist churches should be led by a plurality of elders as opposed to a single elder. — a position he has defended in multiple books and that has become a defining feature of the 9Marks approach to church leadership.

== Selected works ==
- Dever, Mark E., ed., Polity: A Collection of Historic Baptist Documents-Biblical Arguments on How to Conduct Church Life (2001)
- A Display of God's Glory (2001)
- Nine Marks of a Healthy Church (2004)
- The Deliberate Church - Building Your Ministry on the Gospel (2005)
- The Message of the New Testament: Promises Kept (2005)
- The Message of the Old Testament: Promises Made (2006)
- By Whose Authority? Elders in Baptist Life (2006)
- The Gospel and Personal Evangelism (2007)
- What is a Healthy Church? (2007)
- 12 Challenges Churches Face (2008)
- In My Place Condemned He Stood: Celebrating the Glory of the Atonement (2008)
- It is Well: Expositions on Substitutionary Atonement, with Michael Lawrence (2010)
- What Does God Want of us Anyway? (2010)
- Preach: Theology Meets Practice, with Greg Gilbert (2012)
- The Church: the Gospel Made Visible (2012)
- ' Discipling: How to Help Others Follow Jesus ' (2016)
