= Expository preaching =

Form of preaching

Expository preaching, also known as expositional preaching, is a form of preaching that focuses on interpreting a particular text or passage of Scripture. The preacher attempts to explain what a Biblical text means. Exegesis is technical and grammatical exposition, a careful drawing out of the meaning of a passage in its original context. While the term exposition can be used in connection with any verbal informative teaching on any subject, the term is also used in relation to Bible preaching and teaching. The practice originated from the Jewish tradition of the rabbi giving a "Dvar Torah", explaining a passage from the Torah, during the prayer services. Expository preaching differs from topical preaching in that the former concentrates on a specific text and discusses topics covered therein; the latter concentrates on a specific topic and references texts covering the topic.

== General overview and background ==
Expository preaching is a term and technique that refers to the proclamation of the content of the Bible as it appears in the text, as opposed to an emphasis on application to the hearers: other techniques include textual, topical, topical-expository, and lectionary. According to the proponents of expository preaching the weaknesses of the other forms generally center around their inability to strictly expose the original meaning of the text. There is of course overlap between all types as they share one text. The expository method of preaching is favored among those who believe that the Bible is the very word of God and thus worthy of being presented in its purest essence, rather than modifying the message to match the characteristics of the audience.

== Methods of exposition ==
There are three ways in which texts are selected for exposition:

- use of a lectionary (common in many mainline denominational churches),
- lectio continua (Latin meaning continuous reading), where each passage of the Bible is read consecutively on each successive Sunday, or
- letting the preacher or individual church decide which books or passages are examined (common in evangelical churches from both mainline denominations and independent churches).

== The lectionary method ==
A lectionary is a pre-arranged set of passages on which the preacher is to expound. The passages found in the lectionary are usually influenced by the church calendar, and are sometimes set by the particular denomination of the minister and church.

- The primary advantage of using a denominationally based lectionary is that the same themes and passages are expounded at the same time throughout that body of churches. Use of a lectionary also has the advantage of covering large sections of the Bible so that the congregation is exposed to them over a reasonable amount of time.
- One disadvantage of using lectionaries is that the church and preacher are somewhat constrained by the lectionary's rules. Another disadvantage is that the set passages in the lectionary may not cover an entire book of the Bible, or may contain too much information for the preacher to cover in one sermon. Also, a lectionary produced by denominations may carry that denomination's biases in presentation.
- As a way of steering a middle course, one that sees pedagogical value in retaining the liturgical year and yet promotes a broader exposure to Scripture, is Timothy Slemmons' proposal, Year D: A Quadrennial Supplement (2012), which urges "greater attention to what we have heard" (Heb 2:1–3) by means of applying what he calls "the principle of canonical comprehensiveness." In short, lectionary design should be expanded so as to allow every text in the canon at least some representation in the reading cycle of the church, while respecting the preacher's freedom of conscience to decide what texts will actually be read in any given service.

== Individual choice method ==
When the passages are determined by the preacher or the individual church, the preacher has the freedom to work out which passages are studied at particular times. In such a situation, the preacher will sometimes preach through an entire book of Scripture, which generally allows a far more detailed look at the text being studied. Under some circumstances, preachers may prefer to preach through whole books of the Bible systematically over a long period of time. For example, suppose a preacher decides to cover the book of I John. On the beginning week of the series, the preacher may explain and apply 1 John 1.1–4, then 1 John 1.5–7 the following week, then 1 John 1.8–10 after that, and would continue until all of 1 John is covered. Then another book of the Bible is examined, or else a specific topic is covered for a time (few if any churches use the expository method exclusively, even where it is predominant topical studies are used as either "breaks" between books or to cover a specific area of concern to the congregation).

- The key advantage of this system is that the preacher is forced to expound passages that may not be examined or applied normally under a topical series.
- The disadvantage of this system is that certain parts of the Bible (especially the Old Testament) may be overlooked. The preacher is also able to ignore those parts of the Bible that might appear to contradict his selected text or his sermon's points.

Other preachers may preach from isolated texts – from Genesis 1:3 one week, and Isaiah 5:12 the next. Expository preaching does not always have to mean preaching series of sermons on a similar theme or book of the Bible.

== Advantages and disadvantages ==
Some advantages of expository preaching are as follows: 1) The presentation of the entire content of an entire Bible passage is attempted regardless of the desires of the congregation. Hot topics and controversial topics may not be avoided; pandering is diminished. 2) The preacher is never lost for a sermon subject. 3) The preacher is not left to guess the needs of his flock and to present appropriate topics, since the preacher believes that God's word has God's comprehensive diet for his sheep.

Some disadvantages of expository preaching are as follows: 1) The truths in a particular Bible passage may not be those most needed by a particular audience at their point of life. 2) The topic presented may lack the unity afforded by the topical method. 3) By limiting the message to a certain passage, the presentation of topics in their fullness may be neglected. Therefore, in order to properly address the context and content at hand in a given passage, the preacher may become topical by concentrating on the topic at hand, and integrating other supporting passages.

W. A. Criswell covered the entire Bible over a 17-year period as pastor of the First Baptist Church of Dallas, Texas. John MacArthur (pastor of Grace Community Church in Sun Valley, CA) spent nearly a decade in the book of Luke alone. J. Vernon McGee was a radio preacher who preached through the entire Bible in five year cycles.

== Prominent expository preachers ==
Expository preaching took on new life in the Reformation when Ulrich Zwingli began his continuous exposition of the Gospel of Matthew on January 1, 1519 in Zürich. Other Reformers, like Zwingli's friend Johannes Oecolampadius, followed suit. According to Hughes Oliphant Old, Oecolampadius' translations of the sermons of John Chrysostom, one of many church fathers who also practiced expository preaching, inspired him to return to this classic form, and with his own exposition of 1 John in 1523, the pattern for preaching in Basel, one that would be formalized in 1529, was set. Though both Oecolampadius and Zwingli died in 1531, the expository form of preaching they (and other Swiss Reformers, like Wolfgang Capito and Martin Bucer) established would be the form inherited, and some would say perfected, by John Calvin himself, who began to draft his Institutes of the Christian Religion in Basel in 1535, where every preacher in every pulpit was now devoted to continuous reading and preaching through books of the Bible.

Zwingli was succeeded in Zürich by Heinrich Bullinger, Oecolampadius by Oswald Myconius in Basel, while John Knox would take the form of exposition he learned from Calvin in Geneva back to Scotland. Translations of Calvin's expository sermons would inspire generations of Reformed Christians in England and the Netherlands, Puritans on both sides of the Atlantic, and the preachers of the Great Awakening.

Many famous evangelical preachers in the modern era have likewise used systematic exposition.

J. Vernon McGee of the Through the Bible radio program is regarded as a positive exemplar of the purely expository method of preaching in modern American times. He preached more than one 5-year cycle through the entire Bible.

Haddon Robinson, teacher on the long-running Discover the Word radio program. Among the seven books he authored is Biblical Preaching: the development and delivery of expository messages, for the study of expository preaching by seminarians.

Reputed to be a great evangelical preacher of the 20th century, Martyn Lloyd-Jones was the minister of Westminster Chapel in London from 1939 to 1968. His series on Romans took years to complete as he worked through the book almost a verse at a time.

Other famous expository preachers include Charles Spurgeon, John Stott, and Dick Lucas from England, William Still from Scotland, Phillip Jensen and David Cook from Australia, and Stephen F. Olford, and Fred Craddock from the United States.

John MacArthur was probably the best-known expository preacher in America and was a proponent of the expository method of preaching (and an outspoken opponent of the topical method as used almost exclusively by some churches). In addition, the Calvary Chapel group of churches, headed by Chuck Smith, include the regular use of expository preaching as one of their distinctives.

Many such prominent preachers in the second half of the twentieth century have put on record that to a lesser or greater extent they were persuaded of the importance of systematic exposition as a result of reading the works of A.W. Pink.

== Relative importance of expository preaching ==
There has been some discussion among preachers of the importance of expository preaching. Some churches give Scripture the dominant position over all other sources of religious understanding. This is most common in fundamentalist and evangelical denominations that take the position that the Bible is God's inerrant word, and contains sufficient information for the Christian to understand their faith and how they should live their lives. In historical theology, these churches may adhere to the Reformation teaching of Sola Scriptura which is present in the statements of faith of a number of mainline denominations (e.g., chapter 1 of The Westminster Confession of Faith).

In practice, many Evangelical and Fundamentalist churches are not regularly exposed to Expository preaching from the pulpit. Despite this, expositions of scripture are more likely to occur in these churches than in non-evangelical ones. The exposition is unlikely to be influenced by material from outside the Bible (though such material may be mentioned in the sermon, for example the writings of a commentator on the passage).

However, in churches that elevate church tradition, individual experience, and/or human reason to a level on par with Scripture, expository preaching (if used) will include reconciliation of the Biblical text to other sources:

- Congregations with a strong view of church tradition or church authority (common in churches with a strong hierarchical structure) will want to know how their denomination has traditionally interpreted the passage.
- Congregations with a strong belief in personal experience (common in the charismatic and Pentecostal circles) will want to understand how the passage relates to their experiences.
- Congregations with a strong belief in human reason (common in churches which reject the view of Biblical inerrancy) will want to know what modern research has to say regarding the authenticity of the passage.

Regardless of these differences of emphasis, however, most preachers and congregations would agree that preaching must be honouring to God rather than to human beings. In practice, this means that the preacher as expositor should be concerned with speaking about what God sees as important. This will be of little use, however, if it does not connect to what the people in the congregation see as important – even if it only does so by seeking to upset their priorities. But the principle must be that when a church is exposed to expository preaching, they are being enabled to hear God speak rather than being told what they think they need to hear.

== Scriptural basis for exposition ==
And on the day called Sunday, all who live in cities or in the country gather together to one place, and the memoirs of the apostles or the writings of the prophets are read, as long as time permits; then, when the reader has ceased, the president verbally instructs, and exhorts to the imitation of these good things.

— Justin Martyr, First Apology Chap. lxvii. — Weekly worship of the Christians. AD 155–157

For those who believe that the dominant source of Christian understanding is the Bible, it may seem obvious that expository preaching should be essential (though this is not the case with the seeker movement). Nonetheless the logic of their position demands that preaching itself should have a scriptural warrant.

The biblical basis for expository preaching can be found in many places in the Bible. 2 Timothy 3:16–17 is perhaps the most important, for it states that Scripture is breathed out by God, which means that the Bible is actually God's words. The phrase breathed out is also a link to the Holy Spirit, which shows a link between the work of God's Spirit, and the work of God's Word. The verse also goes on to explain that Scripture is profitable for teaching, for reproof, for correction, and for training in righteousness. This shows that the Bible is not theoretical, but practical in its application. Finally, it states that the man of God may be competent, equipped for every good work. This has been claimed to show the sufficiency of scripture – that it is all that a Christian needs to understand his faith and how to live his life.

Another primary passage of Scripture that expositors point to is 2 Timothy 4:1–2., which commands the young pastor Timothy to "preach the Word." These three simple words in their context are a strong argument for the necessity of expository preaching. The word for "preach" is a word meaning to herald. Here the preacher is commanded to be a herald, someone who communicates a message not their own. The content of the heralding that they are to do is "the Word." The task of the preacher, therefore, is to communicate the Word of God. This passage is a central argument for the biblical mandate for expository preaching.

Another important verse is Ephesians 6:17, which states that the Sword of the Spirit is the Word of God. This indicates again the link between the work of the Holy Spirit and the work of God's word. It shows that when the word of God is read, examined and applied, there also works the Holy Spirit.

A third important verse is found in Hebrews 4:12, which says that The word of God is living and active, sharper than any double edged sword, piercing to the division of soul and spirit, of joints and of marrow, and discerning the thoughts and intentions of the heart. This second picture of God's word as a deadly sword is deliberate, not because of the violence it implies, but because of the change it can bring to those who listen to God's word. Here also the word of God is almost given a personality of its own – which implies, again, the hidden work of the Holy Spirit as it works with the word of God to change people's lives.

== Movements that promote expository preaching ==
Within the broad Christian church, certain denominational and non-denominational movements exist which promote expository preaching as being essential in the life of the church and should be the normative way in which sermons should be preached. Some of these movements include:

Australia

- Anglican Diocese of Sydney and Moore Theological College
- Australian Fellowship of Evangelical Students
- Presbyterian Church of Australia and Presbyterian Theological Centre
- Sydney Missionary and Bible College

United Kingdom

- Banner of Truth Trust
- Church Society
- ReNew
- Proclamation Trust

United States

- The Master's Seminary and John MacArthur
- Southern Baptist Theological Seminary and Albert Mohler
- Dallas Theological Seminary and Haddon Robinson
- Calvary Chapel and Chuck Smith
- Alliance of Confessing Evangelicals and The Cambridge Declaration
- 9Marks Ministries and Mark Dever
- Sovereign Grace Ministries and C. J. Mahaney
- R. Kent Hughes
- The Gospel Coalition
- The Charles Simeon Trust

== Sources ==
- Preaching and Preachers – Martyn Lloyd-Jones
- Christ Centered Preaching: Redeeming the Expository Sermon – Bryan Chapell
- Rediscovering Expository Preaching: Balancing the Science and Art of Biblical Exposition – John F. MacArthur and The Master's Seminary Faculty
- Anointed Expository Preaching – Stephen F. Olford with David L. Olford
- Biblical Preaching: The Development and Delivery of Expository Messages – Haddon Robinson
- Power in the Pulpit: How to Prepare and Deliver Expository Sermons – Jerry Vines and James L. Shaddix
- The Passion-Driven Sermon: Changing the Way Pastors Preach and Congregations Listen – James L. Shaddix
- I Believe in Preaching – John Stott

Bible quotations are from English Standard Version (ESV) The Holy Bible, English Standard Version. ESV® Text Edition: 2016. Copyright © 2001 by Crossway Bibles, a publishing ministry of Good News Publishers.
