= Dennis Hollinger =

Dennis P. Hollinger
- Born: November 1948 (age 77); U.S.
- Occupations: President Gordon-Conwell Theological Seminary, author, professor
- Spouse: Mary Ann Hollinger

Academic background
- Education: Elizabethtown College, B.A.; Trinity Evangelical Divinity School, M.Div.; Drew University, Ph.D. and M.Phil; Oxford University, post-doctoral studies
- Thesis: American Individualism and Evangelical Social Ethics: a study of Christianity today, 1956-1976 (1981)

Dennis P. Hollinger (born November 1948), is the President Emeritus and the Distinguished Senior Professor of Christian Ethics of Gordon-Conwell Theological Seminary, as of 2019. He served as president and Colman M. Mockler Distinguished Professor of Christian Ethics from 2008 to 2019. He also serves as a Distinguished Fellow with The Center for Bioethics & Human Dignity. Hollinger attended Elizabethtown College for his B.A., Trinity Evangelical Divinity School for his M.Div., Drew University for Ph.D., and has conducted post-doctoral studies at Oxford University.

Hollinger previously held academic appointments at Evangelical Theological Seminary in Myerstown, Pennsylvania, Messiah College in Grantham, Pennsylvania, Associated Mennonite Biblical Seminary in Elkhart, Indiana, and Alliance Theological Seminary in Nyack, New York.

== Works ==
=== Thesis ===
- Hollinger, Dennis P. (1981). American Individualism and Evangelical Social Ethics: a study of Christianity today, 1956-1976 (Ph.D.). Drew University. OCLC 10235735.

=== Books ===
- Hollinger, Dennis P. (1983). Individualism and Social Ethics: An Evangelical Syncretism. Lanham: University Press of America. ISBN 978-0-8191-3580-3.
- ——— (2002). Choosing the Good: Christian Ethics in a Complex World. Grand Rapids, MI: Baker Academic. ISBN 978-0-8010-2563-1.
- ——— (2005). Head, Heart & Hands: Bringing Together Christian Thought, Passion and Action. Downers Grove, IL: InterVarsity Press. ISBN 978-0-8308-3263-7.
- ——— (2009). Meaning of Sex, The: Christian Ethics and the Moral Life. Grand Rapids, MI: Baker Academic. ISBN 978-0-8010-3571-5.

=== Chapters ===
- ——— (1997). "Enjoying God forever: a historical/sociological profile of the health and wealth gospel". In Moo, Douglas J. (ed.). The gospel and contemporary perspectives. Biblical forum series. Vol. 2. Grand Rapids, MI: Kregel Publications. ISBN 9780825433498. OCLC 35796452.

=== Journal articles ===
- ——— (1987). "The Three H's of Christian Maturity". Reformed Journal. 37 (1): 12–16.
- ——— (1989). "Can Bioethics Be Evangelical?". The Journal of Religious Ethics. 17 (2). Wiley-Blackwell: 161–179. JSTOR 40017822. PMID 11659208.
- ——— (2001). "Spirituality on Campus: Cultural Impact at Christian Colleges and Universities". Christian Education Journal. 5 (1): 67–78.
- ——— (2007). "Preaching to Head, Heart and Hands: A Holistic Paradigm for Proclaiming the Word". The Journal of the Evangelical Homiletics Society. 7 (1): 18–37. ISSN 1534-7478.
