= James Emery White =

American pastor and author (born 1961)

- Born: December 20, 1961 (age 64); Chicago, Illinois, U.S.
- Occupation: Professor

Academic background
- Education: Appalachian State University, Southern Baptist Theological Seminary (Ph.D.)

James Emery White (born December 20, 1961), is an American pastor and author. He is the founding pastor of Mecklenburg Community Church in Charlotte, North Carolina, and a former president of Gordon-Conwell Theological Seminary.

== Early life and education ==
White was born in Chicago and lived in California, Washington, and Utah before moving to North Carolina. White earned a B.S. from Appalachian State University, followed by an M.Div. and Ph.D. from the Southern Baptist Theological Seminary. He also studied American religious history at Vanderbilt University and attended the Summer Programme in Theology at Oxford University.

== Career ==
White founded Mecklenburg Community Church in the early 1990s. In 2006 it had an average weekly attendance of 3,000, but more recently it reported an attendance of approximately 10,000.

White is the author of more than 20 books, including the Gold Medallion nominees Serious Times and A Search for the Spiritual, Christianity Today book-of-the-year award winner Embracing the Mysterious God, as well as The Prayer God Longs For and Rethinking the Church. His most recent publications include Christianity for People Who Aren't Christians, Meet Generation Z, The Rise of the Nones, The Church in an Age of Crisis, and What They Didn't Teach You in Seminary. He is also Distinguished Professor of Pastoral Ministry at Anderson University, and consulting editor to Leadership Journal.

In 2006, White was appointed president of Gordon-Conwell Theological Seminary. However, one year later he resigned, citing personal circumstances.

In November 2009, White signed the Manhattan Declaration, a manifesto opposing the legalization of abortion and same-sex marriage on religious grounds.

== Works ==
=== Books ===
- White, James Emery (1992). Opening the Front Door: worship and church growth. Nashville, TN: Convention Press. OCLC 26135154.
- ——— (1994). What is Truth?: a comparative study of the positions of Cornelius Van Til, Francis Schaeffer, Carl F.H. Henry, Donald Bloesch, Millard Erickson. Nashville, TN: Broadman & Holman Publishers. ISBN 978-0-805-41156-0. OCLC 26975646.
- ——— (1997). Rethinking the Church: A Challenge to Creative Redesign in an Age of Transition. Grand Rapids, MI: Baker. ISBN 978-0-801-09039-4. OCLC 36573744.
- ——— (1998). A Search for the Spiritual: exploring real Christianity. Grand Rapids, MI: Baker Books. ISBN 978-0-801-05818-9. OCLC 38732183.
- ——— (1999). You Can Experience - a Spiritual Life. Nashville, TN: Word Pub. ISBN 978-0-849-93766-8. OCLC 41674306.
- ——— (2000). You Can Experience - a Purposeful Life. Nashville, TN: Word Pub. ISBN 978-0-849-93767-5. OCLC 43109935.
- ——— (2003). Embracing the Mysterious God: loving the God we don't understand. Downers Grove, IL: InterVarsity Press. ISBN 978-0-830-82377-2. OCLC 51942374.
- ——— (2004). Serious Times: Making Your Life Matter in an Urgent Day. Downers Grove, IL: InterVarsity Press. ISBN 978-0-830-83211-8. OCLC 54536874.
- ——— (2005). The Prayer God Longs For. Downers Grove, IL: InterVarsity Press. ISBN 978-0-830-83327-6. OCLC 57893568.
- ——— (2006). A Mind for God. Downers Grove, IL: InterVarsity Press. ISBN 978-0-830-83392-4. OCLC 63807797.
- ——— (2008). Wrestling with God: Loving the God We Don't Understand. Downers Grove, IL: InterVarsity Press. ISBN 978-0-830-83363-4. OCLC 213384818.
- ——— (2010). Is Jesus the Only Way to God?. Downers Grove, IL: InterVarsity Press. ISBN 978-0-877-84036-7. OCLC 793379710.
- ——— (2010). Christ Among the Dragons: Finding Our Way Through Cultural Challenges. Downers Grove, IL: InterVarsity Press. ISBN 978-0-830-83312-2. OCLC 550553896.
- ——— (2010). What They Didn't Teach You In Seminary: 25 Lessons for Successful Ministry in Your Church. Grand Rapids, MI: Baker Books. ISBN 978-0-801-01388-1. OCLC 662401673.
- ——— (2012). A Traveler's Guide to the Kingdom: Journeying Through the Christian Life. Downers Grove, IL: InterVarsity Press. ISBN 978-0-830-83818-9. OCLC 759909769.
- ——— (2012). The Church in an Age of Crisis: 25 New Realities Facing Christianity. Grand Rapids, MI: Baker Books. ISBN 978-0-801-01387-4. OCLC 775419979.
- ——— (2014). The Rise of the Nones: Understanding and Reaching the Religiously Unaffiliated. Grand Rapids, MI: Baker Books. ISBN 978-0-801-01623-3. OCLC 861069262.
- ——— (2017). Meet Generation Z: Understanding and Reaching the New Post-Christian World. Grand Rapids, MI: Baker Books. ISBN 978-0801017018.
- ——— (2019). Christianity for People Who Aren't Christians: Uncommon Answers to Common Questions. Grand Rapids, MI: Baker Books. ISBN 978-0-801-09459-0. OCLC 0801094593.
