= Scott M. Gibson =

American theologian and eductor

- Born: April 28, 1957 (age 69); New Castle, Pennsylvania, United States
- Occupation: Professor of Preaching
- Known for: Academic, Teaching Preaching
- Board member of: Evangelical Homiletics Society
- Spouse: Rhonda Lynn Aiken

Academic background
- Education: Pennsylvania State University, Gordon–Conwell Theological Seminary, Princeton Theological Seminary, University of Toronto, University of Oxford
- Alma mater: University of Oxford
- Thesis: Adoniram Judson Gordon, D.D. (1836-1895) Pastor, Premillennialist, Moderate Calvinist, and Missionary Statesman

Academic work
- Discipline: Preaching/ Homiletics
- Institutions: Gordon-Conwell Theological Seminary, Baylor University

Scott Miller Gibson (born April 28, 1957) is an American pastor, theologian, and educator who retired as professor of preaching, holder of the David E. Garland Chair in preaching, and director of the Ph.D. in Preaching Program at Baylor University’s George W. Truett Theological Seminary. He was previously the Haddon W. Robinson Professor of Preaching at Gordon-Conwell Theological Seminary (1991-2018). Gibson is an author, lecturer, preacher, and conference speaker specializing in homiletics.

== Early life and education ==
Gibson was born on April 28, 1957, in New Castle, Pennsylvania, to Bob and Jean Gibson.

He attended Pennsylvania State University, where he earned a bachelor's degree. He earned several Master's degrees in theology and divinity from Gordon–Conwell Theological Seminary, Princeton Theological Seminary, and the University of Toronto. He later earned a Doctor of Philosophy from the University of Oxford.

== Academic career ==
Gibson taught preaching at Gordon–Conwell from 1991 until 2018 when he joined Baylor’s George W. Truett Theological Seminary as the holder of the David E. Garland Chair of Preaching and Director of the Ph.D. Program in Preaching.

Gibson was co-founder, with Keith Willhite of Dallas Seminary, of the Evangelical Homiletics Society (EHS), in 1997. He has served as founding editor of the peer-reviewed journal, The Journal of the Evangelical Homiletics Society since 2000.

In 2018 Dr. Gibson was honored with a Festschrift edited by Matthew D. Kim, No Program but Time, No Book but the Bible: Reflections on Mentoring and Discipleship in Honor of Scott M. Gibson (Eugene: Wipf and Stock). ISBN 978-1-5326-5285-1.

== Personal life ==
Gibson married Rhonda Lynn Aiken (b. 1965) of New Castle, Pennsylvania, on 15 December 2000.

== Ministry ==
Gibson has pastored churches in Pennsylvania, New York, and Massachusetts.

== Writings ==
- Gibson, Scott M.; Willhite, Keith, eds. (1998). The Big Idea of Biblical Preaching: Connecting the Bible to People. Grand Rapids: Baker. ISBN 0-8010-9066-0.
- Gibson, Scott M., ed. (1999). Making a Difference in Preaching: Haddon Robinson on Biblical Preaching. Grand Rapids: Baker. ISBN 0-8010-9147-0.
- Gibson, Scott M. (2001). A.J. Gordon: American Premillennialist. Lanham, MD: University Press of America. ISBN 0-7618-1952-5.
- __________. (2001). Preaching for Special Services. Grand Rapids: Baker. ISBN 0-8010-9111-X.
- __________., ed. (2004). Preaching to a Shifting Culture: 12 Perspectives on Preaching that Connects. Grand Rapids: Baker. ISBN 0-8010-9162-4.
- __________., ed. (2005). Contemporary Baptists and Historic Faith. Westminster, CA: Principle Press. ISBN 978-0-9720325-0-6.
- __________., ed. (2006). Preaching the Old Testament. Grand Rapids: Baker. ISBN 978-0-8010-6623-8.
- __________. (2008). Should We Use Someone Else’s Sermon? Preaching in a Cut and Paste World. Grand Rapids: Zondervan. ISBN 978-0-310-28673-8.
- __________., ed. (2010). and introduction to, How Christ Came to Church: The Pastor’s Dream, A Spiritual Autobiography by A.J. Gordon. Grand Rapids: Kregel. ISBN 978-0-8254-2687-2.
- __________., (2012). Preaching with a Plan: Sermon Strategies for Growing Mature Believers. Grand Rapids: Baker. ISBN 978-0-8010-9159-9.
- __________., ed. (2016). Preaching Points: 55 Tips for Improving Your Pulpit Ministry. Wooster: Weaver. Now: Bellingham: Lexham Press. ISBN 1-68359-208-5.
- __________., ed. (2018). The Worlds of the Preacher: Navigating Biblical, Cultural, and Personal Contexts. Grand Rapids: Baker. ISBN 0-8010-9961-7.
- Gibson, Scott M. and Kim, Matthew D., eds. (2018). Homiletics and Hermeneutics: Four Views of Preaching Today. Grand Rapids: Baker. Co-editor and author of chapters. ISBN 978-0-8010-9869-7.
- Gibson, Scott M., ed. (2019). Training Preachers: A Guide to Teaching Homiletics. Bellingham: Lexham. Editor and author of chapters. ISBN 978-1-68359-206-8.
- Gibson, Scott M. and Mason, Karen. (2020). Preaching Hope in Darkness: Addressing Suicide from the Pulpit. Bellingham: Lexham. ISBN 978-1-68359-411-6.
- Gibson, Scott M. and Still, Todd D., eds. (2020). With Radiant Hope: Timely and Timeless Reflections from George W. Truett. Waco: Big Bear Books/Baylor University Press. ISBN 1-4813-1399-1.
- Gibson, Scott M. and Kim, Matthew D., eds. (2021). The Big Idea Companion for Preaching and Teaching. Grand Rapids: Baker. ISBN 978-1-5409-6179-2.
