= Robert Letham =

British pastor, theologian, and academic

- Born: 15 November 1947 (age 78); London, England
- Occupations: Director of Research at Union School of Theology (formerly called Wales Evangelical School of Theology), Adjunct Professor of Systematic Theology at Westminster Theological Seminary
- Spouse: Joan
- Children: Two daughters and one son

Academic background
- Education: B.A., University of Exeter; P.G.C.E., University of Nottingham; M.A.R. & Th.M., Westminster Theological Seminary; Ph.D., University of Aberdeen
- Alma mater: University of Aberdeen

Academic work
- Era: Late 20th and Early 21st Century
- Main interests: Calvin and early Reformed theology, The Trinity, Patristic Theology, Christology

Robert Letham (born 15 November 1947) is Professor of Systematic and Historical Theology at the Union School of Theology (formerly called Wales Evangelical School of Theology). He is also Adjunct Professor of Systematic Theology at Westminster Theological Seminary.

Letham's academic education started with a B.A. (Hons.) in Politics awarded by the University of Exeter in 1969. He then gained a P.G.C.E. in 1971 from the University of Nottingham. He moved to Westminster Theological Seminary earning an M.A.R. and Th. M. in 1975 and 1976, respectively. He was awarded a Ph.D. from the University of Aberdeen in 1980.

He began pastoral ministry at Emmanuel Presbyterian Church (OPC), Whippany, New Jersey from 1981 to 1986. He also served as senior minister at Emmanuel Orthodox Presbyterian Church in Wilmington, Delaware for 17 years.

He has taught theology at the London School of Theology, Westminster Theological Seminary, and Reformed Theological Seminary (Washington DC/Baltimore). He is also a visiting fellow, Faculty of Religion and Theology, Texts and Traditions, at the Vrije Universiteit, Amsterdam. Since 2007, he has been a senior tutor in Systematic and Historical Theology at the Union School of Theology.

== Works ==
- The Relationship Between Saving Faith and Assurance of Salvation. Westminster Theological Seminary, Th. M. 1976.
- Saving Faith and Assurance in Reformed Theology: Zwingli to the Synod of Dort. University of Aberdeen, Ph. D. 1979.
- The Work of Christ. Downers Grove: InterVarsity Press. 1993.
- The Lord's Supper: eternal word in broken bread. Downers Grove: InterVarsity Press. 2001.
- The Holy Trinity: in Scripture, history, theology and worship. Phillipsburg: P&R Publishing. 2004.
- Through Western Eyes: Eastern Orthodoxy: a reformed perspective. Fearn, Scotland: Mentor. 2007.
- The Westminster Assembly: Reading its Theology in Historical Context. Phillipsburg: P&R Publishing. 2009.
- Union with Christ: in Scripture, history, and theology. Phillipsburg: P&R Publishing. 2011.
- A Christian's Pocket Guide to Baptism: the water that unites. Fearn, Scotland: Christian Focus. 2012.
- The Message of the Person of Christ: the word made flesh. Downers Grove: InterVarsity Press. 2013.
- Gamechangers: Key Figures of the Christian Church. Fearn, Scotland: Christian Focus. 2015.
- Systematic Theology. Wheaton, Illinois, USA: Crossway. 2019.

The Holy Trinity: In Scripture, history, theology and worship. Revised and Expanded edition . Phillipsburg, New Jersey, 2019. The Holy Spirit, P&R Publishing, 2023
