= Roger Nicole =

Swiss-American theologian, author and academic

Roger R. Nicole
- Born: December 10, 1915; Charlottenburg, Germany
- Died: December 11, 2010 (aged 95)
- Occupation: Reformed Baptist theologian
- Known for: proponent of Christian egalitarianism and biblical inerrancy
- Spouse: Annette (nee Cyr)

Academic background
- Education: Sorbonne, Gordon Divinity School, Wheaton College
- Alma mater: Harvard University (PhD)
- Thesis: (1967)

Academic work
- Institutions: Gordon Divinity School

Roger R. Nicole (December 10, 1915 – December 11, 2010) was a native Swiss Reformed Baptist theologian and proponent of Christian egalitarianism and biblical inerrancy. He was an associate editor for the New Geneva Study Bible, assisted in the translation of the New International Version, and was a founding member of both the International Council on Biblical Inerrancy and the Evangelical Theological Society, serving as president of the latter in 1956.

== Early life and education ==
Nicole was born to Swiss parents December 10, 1915, in Charlottenburg, Germany. During his childhood, the family moved back to Switzerland, where he lived until 1935. He earned his M.A. from Sorbonne, France, and then emigrated to the United States to continue his studies. He received a B.D. (1939), S.T.M. (1940), and Th.D. (1943) from Gordon Divinity School, his Ph.D. (1967) from Harvard University, and his D.D. (1978) from Wheaton College. In 1946, Nicole married Annette Cyr (1917 - 2008).

== Career ==
In 1944, Nicole joined the faculty at what was then called Gordon Divinity School, now known as Gordon Conwell Theological Seminary. He was appointed professor of theology in 1949, where he remained until retiring in 1986. He continued to teach theology during his retirement at Reformed Theological Seminary, Orlando, Florida. A devotee of mathematics and prolific writer, he produced some 100 articles and contributed to fifty books and reference works. A bibliophile and distinguished librarian with a massive collection, he owned Calvin's Commentaries on the Gospels and Acts and other volumes from the 16th and 17th centuries. The library of Reformed Theological Seminary in Orlando contains over twenty thousand of his personal books. They take up one half of the current library.

== Legacy ==
Respected internationally for his Christian statesmanship and scholarship, he was an acknowledged expert in the thought of Reformation leader John Calvin. Evangelical commentator David F. Wells dedicated his 1985 release, Reformed Theology in America, simply “to Roger Nicole, a man of God.” J. I. Packer wrote this tribute to Nicole: "Awesome for brain power, learning and wisdom, endlessly patient and courteous in his gentle geniality, and beloved by a multitude as pastor, mentor and friend."

== Other interests ==
An avid philatelist, Nicole had a personal collection of approximately one million stamps. He also had a collection of six thousand mystery novels.

== Death ==
Nicole died on December 11, 2010 from pneumonia in Longwood, Florida, at the age of 95.

== Selected works ==
Nicole wrote more than 100 articles and contributed to 50 books and reference works, including

=== Thesis ===
- Nicole, Roger R. (1943). An Introduction to the Study of Certain Antinomies of the Christian Faith (Th.D.). Gordon Divinity School. OCLC 7431945.

=== Books ===
- Nicole, Roger R.; Michaels, J. Ramsey, eds. (1980). Inerrancy and Common Sense. Grand Rapids, MI: Baker Book House. ISBN 0-8010-6733-2.
- ——— (1981). Moyse Amyraut: a bibliography with special reference to the controversy on universal grace. New York: Garland Pub. ISBN 0-8240-9350-X.
- ——— (1987). Fallible manuscripts - infallible autographs. Evangelical Theological Society. Vol. ETS-0406. Tacoma, WA: Evangelical Theological Society. OCLC 16816011.
- ——— (1990). A response to Clark Pinnock's "Inclusive finality or universally accessible salvation". Evangelical Theological Society. Vol. ETS-4135. Tacoma, WA: Evangelical Theological Society. OCLC 22770701.
- ———; Sproul, R. C. (1996). Explaining Inerrancy. Orlando, FL: Ligonier Ministries. OCLC 41450739. - Nicole writes the forward
- ———; Sproul, R. C.; et al., eds. (1998). Reformation Study Bible. - Nicole was Associate Editor (a name change for the "New Geneva Study Bible")
- ——— (2002). Standing Forth: Collected Writings of Roger Nicole. Christian Focus Publishers. ISBN 1-85792-646-3.
- ——— (2003). Our Sovereign Saviour. Christian Focus Publishers. ISBN 1-85792-737-0.

=== Chapters ===
- ——— (1962). "A postscript on theology". In Henry, Carl F. H. (ed.). Basic Christian doctrines. Holt, Rinehart and Winston. ISBN 0-8010-4033-7.
- ——— (1980). "The Nature of Inerrancy". In ———; Michaels, J. Ramsey (eds.). Inerrancy and Common Sense. Grand Rapids, MI: Baker Book House. ISBN 0-8010-6733-2.
- ——— (1993). "True and false assurance". In Sproul, R. C. (ed.). Doubt & assurance. Grand Rapids, MI: Baker Book House [for] Ligonier Ministries. ISBN 0-8010-8352-4.
- ——— (2005). "Hermeneutics and the gender debate". In Pierce, Ronald W.; Groothuis, Rebecca Merrill (eds.). Discovering biblical equality: complementarity without hierarchy. InterVarsity Press. ISBN 0-8308-2834-6.

=== Other ===
- "Christians for Biblical Equality: Statement on Men, Women and Biblical Equality" Contributor. Minneapolis: Christians for Biblical Equality, 1989.

== Festschriften ==
- Wells, David F., ed. (1985). Reformed theology in America: a history of its modern development. Grand Rapids, MI: Eerdmans. ISBN 0-8028-0096-3.
- Hill, Charles E.; James, Frank A. J. L., eds. (2004). The Glory of the Atonement: Biblical, Historical & Practical Perspectives: Essays in Honor of Roger R. Nicole. Downers Grove, IL: InterVarsity Press. ISBN 0-8308-2689-0.
