= Union School of Theology =

Theological school in Bridgend, Wales

- Former names: Barry School of Evangelism; South Wales Bible College; Evangelical Theological College of Wales; Wales Evangelical School of Theology
- Type: Reformed
- Established: 1936
- President: Michael Reeves
- Faculty: 24
- Students: 215 (2019)
- Location: Bridgend, Wales; 51.507°N 3.607°W
- Campus: Bryntirion House, Bridgend
- Website: http://www.ust.ac.uk

Union School of Theology is a Reformed educational institution in Bryntirion in Bridgend, South Wales. The School is part of the wider Christian ministry of Union which also involves church planting and the production of theological resources.

== Leadership and faculty ==
The President of the school is Michael Reeves who also functions as professor of theology. He took up the role in January 2016, having been head of theology at the Universities and Colleges Christian Fellowship. Other faculty of the school include provost Dustin Benge, Robert Letham, Raymond C. Ortlund Jr., Donald Fairbairn and Richard Turnbull.

== Programmes of study ==
The majority of Union School of Theology students study with the School in order to prepare for Christian ministry.

=== Campus courses ===
A three-year, full-time residential BA Hons degree in Theology is offered, covering Biblical Studies, Theological and Historical Studies, and Ministerial and Missional Practice. Students on the Masters of Theology (MTh) and PhD programmes may also reside on campus.

=== Learning Communities ===
The School's largest programme, a Graduate diploma in theology, is taught in regional church-based 'Learning Communities' in more than 20 locations globally including Malaysia, Oxford, Athens, Rome, Tulsa, Oklahoma, and Calgary, Alberta. The course is designed to combine academic rigor with 'the convenience and added value of sharing and growing together in vibrant local settings under the care and guidance of an experienced Lead Mentor.'

=== Postgraduate and research degrees ===
The School's Master of Theology (MTh) is a taught postgraduate master's degree, accessible both on the campus and in Learning Communities, and either full- or part-time. Research degrees, up to PhD level are offered through 'a collaborative partnership with VU University Amsterdam'.

== History ==
The college was founded in 1936 as the Barry School of Evangelism (1936–1950) (also called Barry Bible College). It was successively known as South Wales Bible College (1950–1985), Evangelical Theological College of Wales (1985–2006), and Wales Evangelical School of Theology (2006–2016). The school was situated in Barry from 1950 to 1985. D. Eryl Davies became Principal in September 1985, moving the college to the seven acre grounds of the historic Bryntirion House in Bridgend. Since 2007 the school has maintained a partnership with SaRang Community Church, a Korean church which has added Wales and the United Kingdom to its worldwide areas of active mission. In 2016, with the arrival as Michael Reeves as President, the college was renamed Union School of Theology.

The school had 215 students in 2019–2020 in undergraduate and graduate degree programs up to the Ph.D. The graduate programme was described by Iain Murray as "well-known British training schools for ministers and missionaries" that attracts evangelical Christians wishing to study for the ministry.

== Criticism ==
The School has been the subject of criticism by the Bible League Quarterly and The Sword and the Trowel for its affiliation with the Korean churches, the involvement of the international director of the Lausanne movement on WEST's board till 2014, and claims of 'ecumenical connections' through the European Leadership Forum.

== Notable alumni ==
- Ian Paisley began his theological training at the school when it was known as the Barry School of Evangelism.

== See also ==
- British Conservative Evangelicalism
