= William L. Lane =

American New Testament theologian and professor of biblical studies (1931–1999)

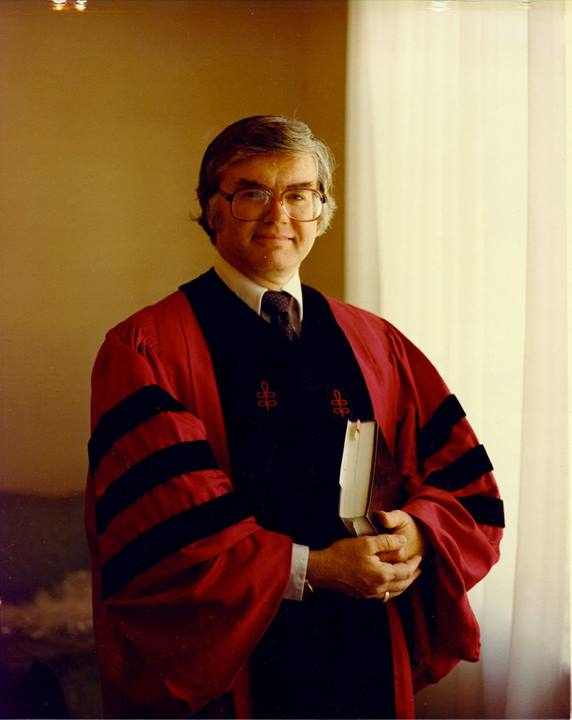
- Born: 1931
- Died: 1999 (aged 67–68); Nashville, Tennessee
- Occupation: Professor of Biblical Studies
- Years active: 20th century

Academic background
- Education: Wesleyan University, Gordon Divinity School, Westminster Theological Seminary
- Alma mater: Harvard Divinity School (Th.D.)

Academic work
- Discipline: Biblical studies
- Institutions: Gordon-Conwell Theological Seminary; Western Kentucky University; Seattle Pacific University
- Notable works: The Encyclopedia of Modern Christian Missions, The New Testament Speaks, The Gospel According to Mark (NICNT)

William L. Lane (1931– March 8, 1999) was an American New Testament theologian and professor of biblical studies.

== Background and education ==
Lane earned his B.A. from Wesleyan University, his M.Div. from Gordon Divinity School (1955), his Th.M. from Westminster Theological Seminary (1956), and his Th.D. from Harvard Divinity School.

== Academic career ==
Lane began his academic career as professor of New Testament and Judaic studies at Gordon-Conwell Theological Seminary. He went on to serve as professor of religious studies at Western Kentucky University for fifteen years. During this time, he became a mentor to Christian singer and songwriter Michael Card. He was also recognized with the faculty award for "Distinguished Contributions in Research or Creativity" for the 1983–1984 academic year. Lane joined the faculty of Seattle Pacific University as dean of the School of Religion in 1989. He was named "Professor of the Year" by the student body in 1992, and served as the Paul T. Walls Chair in Wesleyan and Biblical Studies from 1993 until his retirement in 1997.

In addition to these roles, Lane also served as one of the translators of the New American Standard Bible, and the New International Version.

== Death and legacy ==
In retirement, Lane moved with his wife to Franklin, Tennessee, where they established a residential biblical research library and discipleship center. Lane died of cancer in a hospital near Nashville, Tennessee, on March 8, 1999.

== Publications ==
Lane was the author or editor of several notable works, including The Encyclopedia of Modern Christian Missions (1967), The New Testament Speaks (1969), The Gospel according to Mark in The New International Commentary on the New Testament (1974), and the two-volume commentary on the Epistle to the Hebrews in the Word Biblical Commentary (1991), which was awarded the 1993 Christianity Today Critic's Choice for "Book of the Year".

== Works ==
=== Books ===
- Lane, William L.; Barker, Glenn W.; Michaels, J. Ramsey (1969). The New Testament speaks. New York: Harper & Row.
- ——— (1974). The Gospel according to Mark: the English text with introduction, exposition, and notes. New International Commentary on the New Testament. Grand Rapids, MI: Eerdmans. ISBN 978-0-8028-2502-5.
- ——— (1978). Ephesians, Philippians, Colossians, 1 and 2 Thessalonians. Understanding the New Testament. Nashville, TN: Holman. ISBN 978-0-8798-1116-7.
- ——— (1985). A Call to Commitment: Responding to the Message of Hebrews. Nashville, TN: Thomas Nelson. ISBN 978-0-8407-5948-1.
- ——— (1991). Hebrews 1-8. Word Biblical Commentary. Vol. 47a. Waco, TX: Word Books. ISBN 978-0-8499-0246-8.
- ——— (1991). Hebrews 9-13. Word Biblical Commentary. Vol. 47b. Dallas, TX: Word Books. ISBN 978-0-8499-0935-1.

=== Editorial ===
- ———; Goddard, Burton L.; Kerr, William Nigel, eds. (1967). The Encyclopedia of Modern Christian Missions: The Agencies. Nashville, TN: Thomas Nelson. OCLC 398812.

=== Articles ===
- ——— (Winter 1968). "Redaktionsgeschichte and the de-historicizing of the New Testament Gospel". Bulletin of the Evangelical Theological Society. 11 (1): 27–33.
- ——— (Fall 1978). "From Historian to Theologian: Milestones in Markan Scholarship". Review & Expositor. 75 (4): 601–617. doi:10.1177/003463737807500409. S2CID 59461596.
