= SaRang Community Church =

- Location: Seocho District, Seoul, South Korea
- Country: South Korea
- Denomination: Presbyterian

History
- Founded: 1978
- Founder: Rev. Han-Heum Oak

- SaRang Community Church
- Hangul: 사랑의교회
- Hanja: 사랑의敎會
- RR: Sarangui gyohoe
- MR: Sarangŭi kyohoe

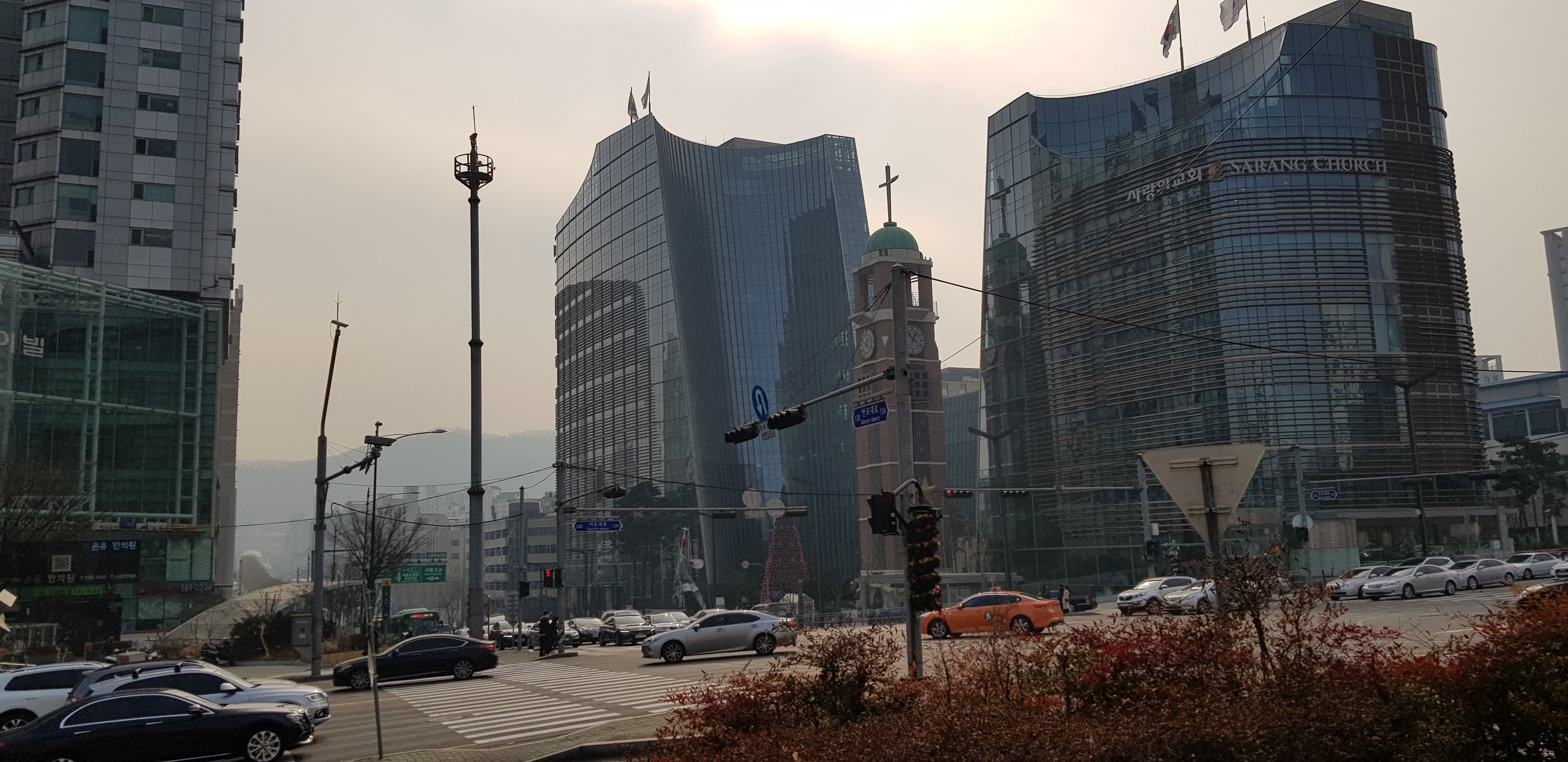
SaRang Community Church

SaRang Community Church is a Presbyterian Church in Seoul, Korea with over 60,000 members.

SaRang, one of several megachurches in Korea, was founded in 1978 by Rev. Oak Han-heum. At Pastor Oak's death in 2010, the church attracted 40,000 worshipers every Sunday and had 80,000 members.

In 2003 Pastor Oak announced his retirement, eschewing the Korean custom of passing a pastorship on to one of the children of the retiring pastor, Oak named Rev. Oh Jung-hyun as the new pastor.

In 2007 SaRang extended its worldwide mission to Europe and the United Kingdom, announcing its sponsorship of the Wales Evangelical School of Theology.

In 2013, the church opened the largest underground church chapel, but it extended its underground area under a nearby public road. The supreme court of Korea ruled that the chapel made the area "socially, economically, and culturally limited in access ― unable to serve public purposes for nearby residents," according to a subsequent report.

== Controversy over use of public road ==
SaRang Community Church, once situated on a bustling thoroughfare in the Gangnam district, faced challenges due to the congregation's substantial size, placing strain on an already crowded area renowned for its entertainment establishments and bars. As the church attracted worshippers from beyond Seoul, who relied on private vehicles as public transportation was not easily accessible, discontent grew among its members due to the inadequate parking facilities.

In the wake of these issues, Pastor Oh, who succeeded the church's founder, Pastor Oak, advocated for the establishment of a new chapel in the Seocho district. However, revelations made by Pastor Oak's son, Oak Seong-ho, disclosed that Pastor Oak had harbored reservations about the ambitious construction project.

The proposal to build the new chapel encountered vehement opposition from local residents of the Seocho district and members of the religious community. The crux of the controversy revolved around a specific fact: the church had acquired a permit from the Seocho District Office to occupy a public road both during and after the construction process. Fierce opposition resulted in an administrative lawsuit, seeking both an injunction to halt construction and, ultimately, the complete revocation of the construction approval. The lawsuit questioned the legality of Seocho District Office's permit allowing the occupation of an underground public road by a religious organization.

Within South Korea's justice system, it is allowed to have up to three trials, including two appeals. In the initial trial and the subsequent appeal, the courts dismissed the lawsuit without considering its merits. However, the Supreme Court of Korea ordered a remand, sending the case back to the administrative court for a hearing based on its merits. On 13 January 2017, the administrative court declared the Seocho District Office's permit, which authorized SaRang Community Church to occupy a public road, as illegal and ordered its cancellation. The Seocho District Office appealed this ruling, but it was upheld in the appellate court on 11 January 2018. Subsequently, both the Seocho District Office and SaRang Community Church appealed to the Supreme Court, but on 17 October 2019, the Supreme Court of Korea upheld and finalized the lower court's ruling.

Following the Supreme Court ruling, the Seocho District Office ordered restoration of the public road. However, as of July 2023, SaRang Community Church has filed another administrative lawsuit, defying the Office order.

== Website ==
- Church Webpage in English
