= Benjamin L. Corey =

American political activist and theologian

- Occupations: Columnist, author
- Writing career
- Genre: Christian
- Website: benjaminlcorey.com

Benjamin L. Corey is an American political activist, theologian, author, blogger, and speaker. He is a prominent figure within the emerging church Movement, Progressive Christianity, and radical Christianity while self-identifying as an Anabaptist. He is the author of the books, Undiluted: Rediscovering The Radical Message of Jesus, and Unafraid: Moving Beyond Fear Based Faith.

== Biography ==
Corey is an alumnus of Gordon-Conwell Theological Seminary in South Hamilton, MA, holding graduate degrees in both theology and intercultural studies (graduating cum laude), and received an earned doctorate from Fuller Theological Seminary in the field of Intercultural Studies. His academic interests include Christian Nonviolence, Syncretism, and the applications of a theology of shalom in Human Trafficking aftercare, which is the subject of his doctoral dissertation.

Corey is a medically retired while getting injured off duty Professional Military Education Instructor from the United States Air Force, and has written extensively about his transition from a Christian fundamentalist in the military, to a prominent Anabaptist. After his conversion to Christian Nonviolence Corey became a notable peace activist in the areas of war, gun violence, and the abolition of capital punishment.

== Beliefs ==
=== Challenges to Christian fundamentalism ===
Corey has frequently challenged Christian fundamentalism. In 2014, the book Distortion: How the Christian Left is Twisting the Gospel & Damaging the Faith, promised to name the names of the new "Christian Left," in America and Corey was among those referenced. This was largely because of Corey opposing what he calls "Pro-Life Hypocrisy" on the part of conservative Christians. Corey has also been a key figure in the progressive political movement, Vote Common Good, and has toured the United States since 2018 holding political rallies in an attempt to sway religious voters away from the Republican Party under Donald Trump.

In addition to speaking out against Pro-Life Hypocrisy while advocating for a more holistic, nonviolent Christian ethic, Corey has frequently challenged other key aspects of Christian fundamentalism such as the modern end times movement, which Corey states is a 19th-century invention and outside the realm of historic Christianity. Corey is also one of a growing number of prominent Christians who are disputing Christianity's traditional teachings on hell, arguing in Time that the traditional view of "eternal conscious torment" is inconsistent with both the Scriptures and the character of a loving God. Corey has also been a frequent voice against American nationalism within the Christian community, holding the position that Christians should pledge their loyalty only to God, and never to a nation state. In addition, Corey has publicly challenged fundamentalism's treatment of the LGBTQ community.

=== Syncretism within American Christianity ===
Corey argues that much of American Christianity has fallen prey to syncretism, and that instead of the Christianity taught by Jesus, it has been diluted by the mixing of conservative cultural norms (such as war and individualism) which Corey asserts are actually opposed to Christian values. This process of grafting American ideals into the message of Jesus is something he argues has caused Christianity in America to develop "cataracts of culture" which serve to obscure the more radical nature of Jesus' message.

== Personal life ==
Corey is the father of two children adopted from Peru. He is an outspoken advocate of adoption who has urged the Christian community to rethink the trendiness of adoption to ensure children are adopted ethically, and adopted by properly equipped families.

== Bibliography ==
- A Living Alternative: Anabaptist Christianity in a Post-Christendom World (contributing author) (Ettelloc Publishing, 2014)
- Undiluted: Rediscovering The Radical Message of Jesus (Destiny Image, 2014)
- Unafraid: Moving Beyond Fear-Based Faith (Harper One, 2017)

== See also ==
- Post-Evangelical
