= Stanley Grenz =

American theologian (1950–2005)

The Reverend Stanley Grenz
- Born: Stanley James Grenz; 7 January 1950; Alpena, Michigan, US
- Died: 12 March 2005 (aged 55); Vancouver, British Columbia, Canada
- Spouse: Edna Grenz

Ecclesiastical career
- Religion: Christianity (Baptist)
- Ordained: 1976

Academic background
- Education: University of Colorado Boulder; Denver Seminary; LMU Munich
- Doctoral advisor: Wolfhart Pannenberg
- Influences: George Lindbeck

Academic work
- Discipline: Theology
- Institutions: North American Baptist Seminary; Carey Theological College; Regent College; Northern Baptist Theological Seminary; Mars Hill Graduate School
- Website: stanleyjgrenz.com

Stanley James Grenz (1950–2005) was an American Protestant Baptist theologian and ethicist.

== Early years ==
Grenz was born on 7 January 1950 in Alpena, Michigan. He studied at the University of Colorado Boulder and obtained a Bachelor of Arts in 1973, then he studied theology at the Denver Seminary and obtained a Master of Divinity in 1979. He also studied at LMU Munich and obtained a Doctor of Theology, under the supervision of theologian Wolfhart Pannenberg. He was ordained to pastoral ministry on 13 June 1976.

== Ministry ==
In 1971, he became youth director and assistant pastor of Northwest Baptist Church, Denver, Colorado until 1976. In 1979, he became pastor of Rowandale Baptist Church, Winnipeg, Manitoba until 1981, and interim pastor on several occasions. He served on many Baptist boards and agencies and also as a consulting editor of Christianity Today.

== Educator ==
While in the pastorate (1979–1981), Grenz taught courses both at the University of Winnipeg and at Winnipeg Theological Seminary (now Providence University College and Theological Seminary). He served as Professor of Systematic Theology and Christian Ethics at the North American Baptist Seminary in Sioux Falls, South Dakota, from 1981 to 1990.

For twelve years (1990–2002), Grenz held the position of Pioneer McDonald Professor of Baptist Heritage, Theology and Ethics at Carey Theological College and at Regent College in Vancouver. After a one-year sojourn as Distinguished Professor of Theology at Baylor University and George W. Truett Theological Seminary in Waco, Texas (2002–2003), he returned to Carey in August 2003 to resume his duties as Pioneer McDonald Professor of Theology.

From 1996 to 1999 he carried an appointment as Professor of Theology and Ethics (Affiliate) at Northern Baptist Theological Seminary in Lombard, Illinois.

In fall 2004, he assumed an appointment as Professor of Theological Studies at Mars Hill Graduate School in Seattle, Washington.

== Theology ==
Grenz' primary contributions were made discussing how evangelical Christianity ought to relate to the world. He wrote on a wide range of subjects, from sexuality to history to basic apologetics, and was one of North America's leading evangelical voices in the late 20th century and early 21st century.

Grenz held to the main principles of Arminian theology. He held to a specific concept eternal security in which "the presence of the Spirit guarantees that the one who is truly converted will remain in faith to the end" reflecting his view of corporate election.

== Personal ==
Married to Edna Grenz, a church musician, Grenz was the father of two children, Joel Grenz and Corina Kuban, and was grandfather to one grandchild, Anika Grace Kuban. Included in two editions of Who's Who in Religion, as well as in the 2002 edition of Who's Who in U.S. Writers, Editors and Poets, Grenz died in his sleep 12 March 2005 from a brain aneurysm in St. Paul's Hospital, Vancouver.

== Selected works ==
- Prayer: The Cry for the Kingdom, 1988 (2005 Revised Edition) (ISBN 0-913573-92-2)
- Sexual Ethics: A Biblical Perspective, 1990 (ISBN 0-664-25750-X)
- Revisioning Evangelical Theology: A Fresh Agenda for the 21st Century, 1993 (ISBN 0-8308-1772-7)
- Women in the Church: A Biblical Theology of Women in Ministry, with Denise Muir Kjesbo, 1995 (ISBN 0-8308-1862-6)
- A Primer on Postmodernism, 1996, (ISBN 0-8028-0864-6)
- Created for Community: Connecting Christian Belief With Christian Living, 1996 (1998 Second Edition) (ISBN 0-8010-2125-1)
- 20th Century Theology: God & the World in a Transitional Age with Roger Olson, 1997 (ISBN 0-8308-1525-2)
- Who Needs Theology?: An Invitation to the Study of God's Word – (Olson & Grenz) (1996) ISBN 0-8308-1878-2
- Welcoming but Not Affirming: An Evangelical Response to Homosexuality, 1998, (ISBN 0-664-25776-3)
- Theology for the Community of God, 2000, (ISBN 0-8028-4755-2)
- The Moral Quest: Foundation of Christian Ethics, 2000, (ISBN 0-8308-1568-6)
- Renewing the Center: Evangelical Theology in a Post-Theological Era, 2000 (ISBN 0-8010-2239-8)
- Beyond Foundationalism: Shaping Theology in a Postmodern Context, with John Franke, 2000 (ISBN 0-664-25769-0)
- The Social God and the Relational Self: A Trinitarian Theology of the Imago Dei, 2001, (ISBN 0-664-22203-X)
- Rediscovering the Triune God: The Trinity in Contemporary Theology, 2004 (ISBN 0-8006-3654-6)

== See also ==
- Amillennialism
- Evangelical left

== Notes and references ==
=== Sources ===
- Battle, John A. (1999). "Postmodernisms Assault on Theology" (PDF). WRS Journal. 6 (2): 24–31.
- Ezigbo, Victor I. (2015). Introducing Christian Theologies. Vol. 2. Eugene, OR: Wipf and Stock Publishers.
- Grenz, Stanley (2000). Theology for the Community of God. Grand Rapids, Michigan: William B. Eerdmans.
- Grenz, Stanley (2005). Biographical Information (PDF).
- Knowles, Steven (2010). Beyond Evangelicalism: The Theological Methodology of Stanley J. Grenz. Farnham, England: Ashgate. ISBN 978-0-7546-6608-0.
- Sexton, Jason (2013). The Trinitarian Theology of Stanley J. Grenz. London, England: Bloomsbury/T&T Clark. ISBN 978-0-5674-6298-5.
- Olson, Roger E. (2014). Arminianism FAQ: Everything You Always Wanted to Know. [Franklin, TE]: Seedbed Publishing. ISBN 9781628241624.
