= Gordon–Conwell Theological Seminary =

Theological seminary in Massachusetts

Gordon-Conwell Theological Seminary
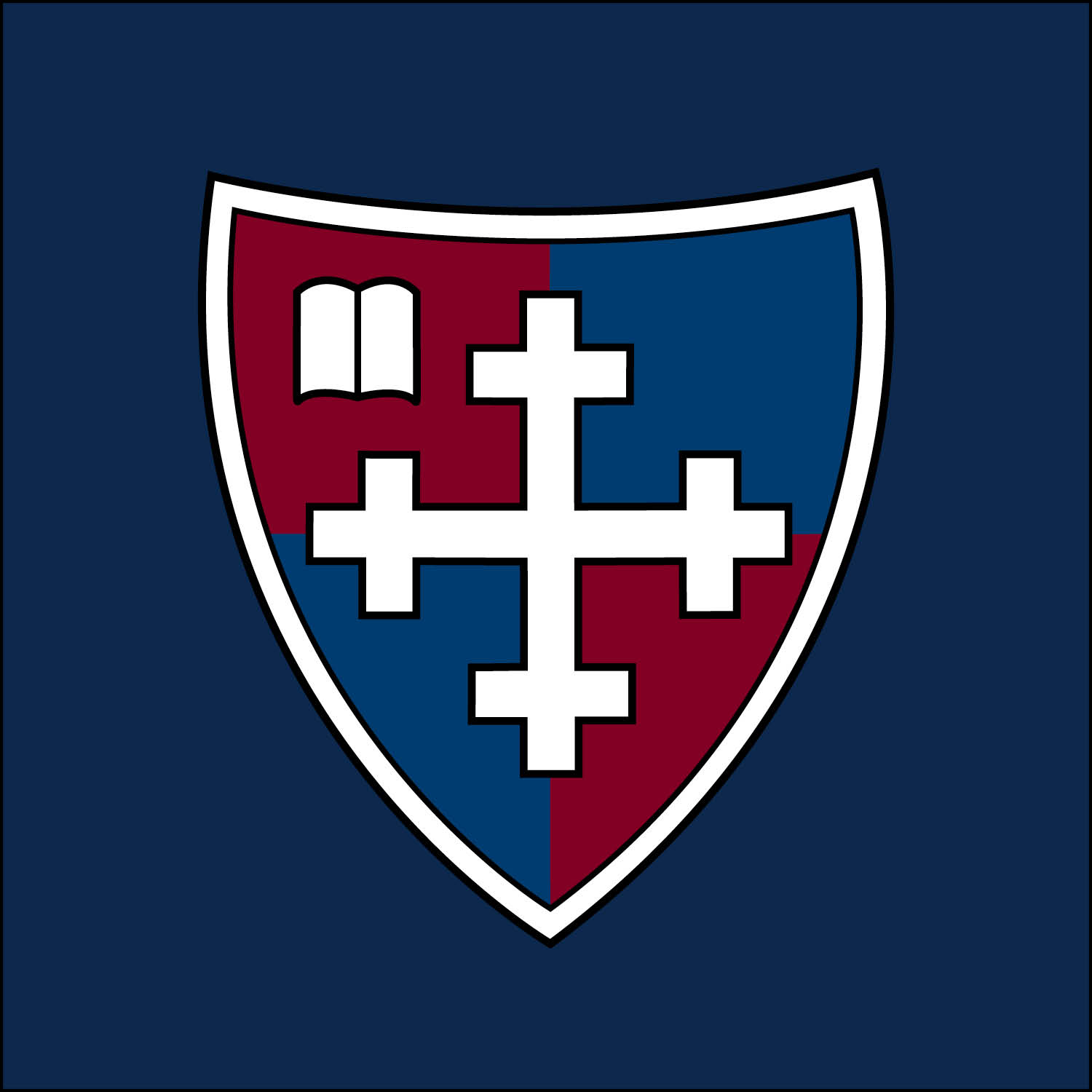
- Gordon-Conwell's Shield Logo
- Former names: Gordon College of Theology and Mission, Gordon Divinity School, Conwell School of Theology
- Motto: Think Theologically, Engage Globally, Live Biblically
- Type: Private
- Established: 1969 merger, 1888 (as Gordon Divinity School), 1889 (as Conwell School of Theology)
- Religious affiliation: Protestant, evangelical
- Academic affiliations: BTI, ATS
- President: Scott W. Sunquist
- Students: 703 FTE (2025)
- Location: South Hamilton, Massachusetts, United States; 42.6129°N 70.8453°W
- Website: gordonconwell.edu

Gordon–Conwell Theological Seminary (GCTS) is an evangelical seminary with its main campus in Hamilton, Massachusetts, and three other campuses in Boston, Massachusetts; Charlotte, North Carolina; and Jacksonville, Florida. According to the Association of Theological Schools, Gordon-Conwell ranks as one of the largest evangelical seminaries in North America in terms of total number of full-time students enrolled.

== History ==
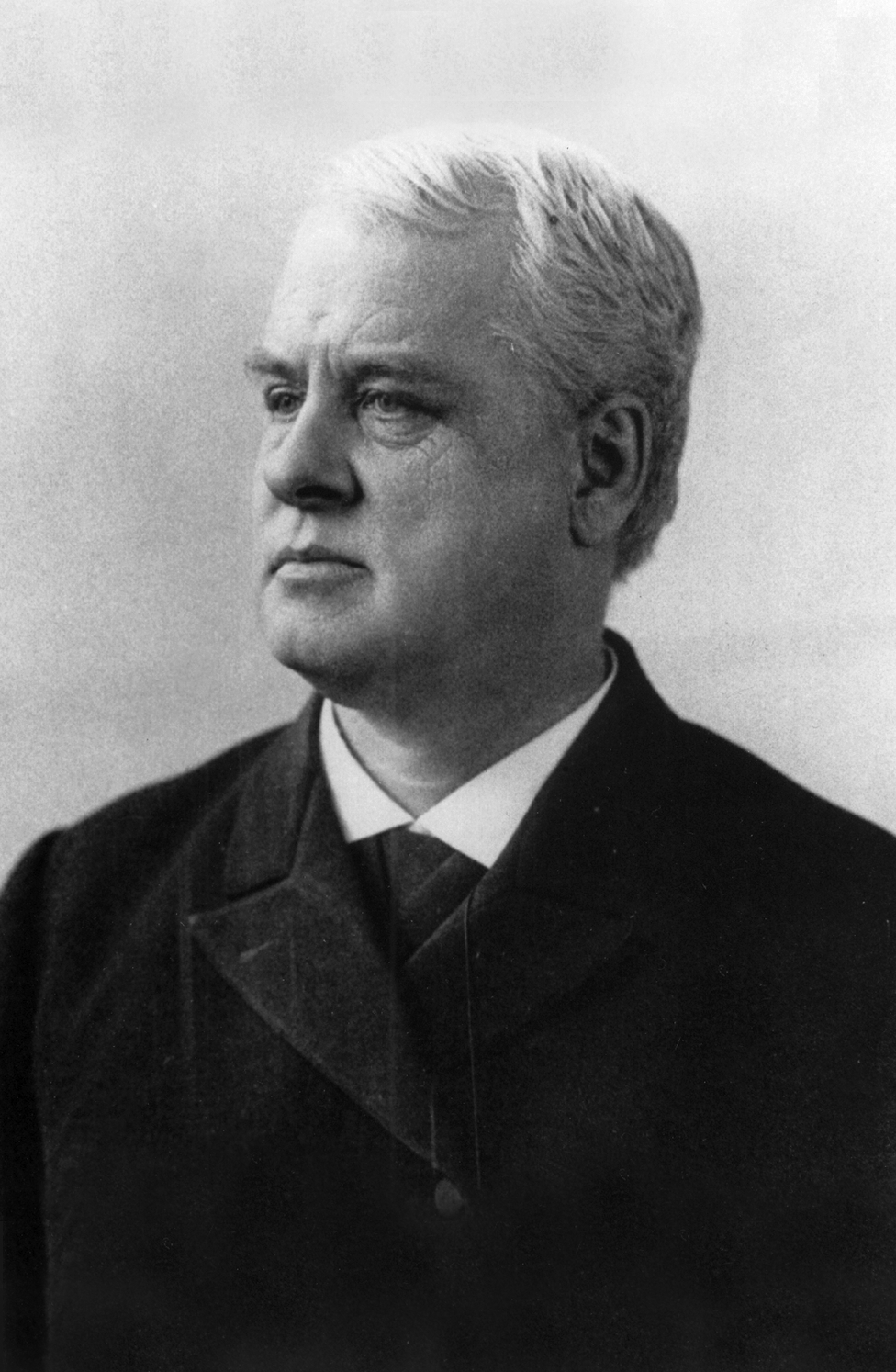
A.J. Gordon

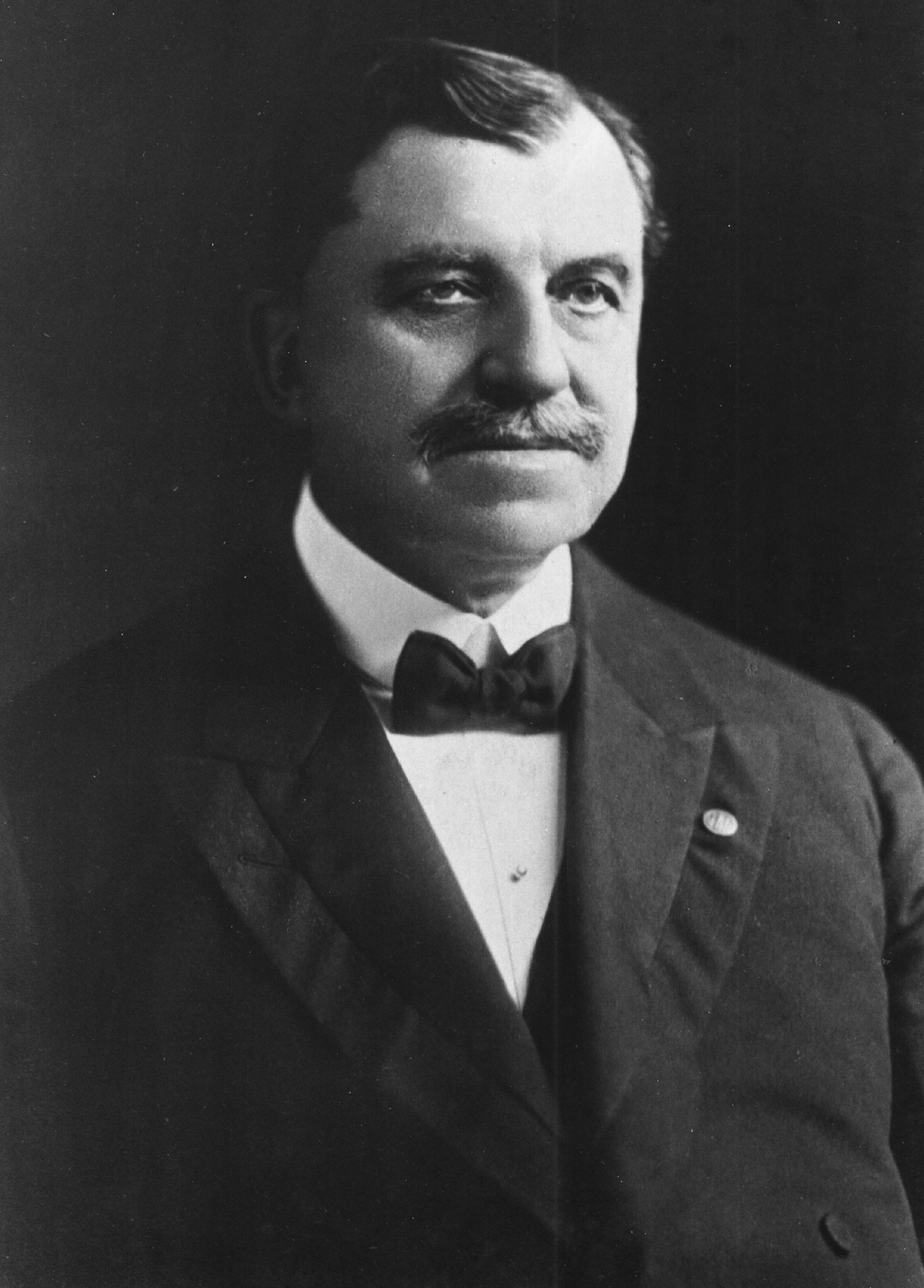
Russell Conwell

Gordon-Conwell arose primarily from the merging and refounding of two separate schools, Gordon Divinity School, formerly of Gordon College (1889) in Wenham, Massachusetts, and the Conwell School of Theology (1888), formerly of Temple University in Philadelphia, Pennsylvania. Both schools were founded in the Baptist theological heritage. Both Adoniram Judson Gordon and Russell Conwell, the namesakes of Gordon-Conwell, were Baptist ministers; Gordon's divinity school was first established as Gordon Bible Institute in 1889, while Conwell's theological school was originally chartered as Temple College in 1888. In addition, the Boston Evangelical Institute, founded as Revere Lay College, also merged with Gordon-Conwell.

Beginning in the 1960s, both Gordon Divinity School and Conwell School of Theology experienced new challenges. In 1961, Temple University became a public university and was forced to divest the theological school, thus re-establishing the previous school of theology as a religious studies department. While Temple University hoped Russell Conwell's legacy would continue to grow through their new religious studies department, J. Howard Pew and Daniel Poling, a Baptist minister and member of Temple's board, felt Conwell's vision to train Baptist ministers would be neglected. Poling contacted evangelist Billy Graham who agreed to help if he could appoint both a board of trustees of his choosing and faculty members he trusted. Graham, in turn, contacted his close friend Harold Ockenga who was due to take the presidency of Gordon College and oversee the financially stressed divinity school. Rather than see two evangelical seminaries compete, Graham proposed merging the two schools to form one evangelical school on the East coast to mirror Fuller Theological Seminary's place on the West Coast. J. Howard Pew agreed to financially back the merger on the condition that the seminary must be divorced from an undergraduate institution. Under the leadership of evangelist Billy Graham and Boston pastor Harold Ockenga along with the financial backing of J. Howard Pew, Gordon-Conwell began holding classes in 1969. Pew provided "$2 million to purchase the land, [Carmelite Junior Seminary in Hamilton], and several million more to refurbish existing facilities and to build and stock a library." Harold Ockenga was selected as its first president. Stuart Babbage was the first vice-president and also served on the faculty alongside Philip Edgcumbe Hughes, R.C. Sproul, Walter Mueller, and Richard Lovelace among others.

Gordon-Conwell initially received protests and negative press for moving theological out of the inner city. In response, Stephen Mott, Michael E. Haynes, pastor of Twelfth Baptist Church in Roxbury and state representative, and Gordon-Conwell trustees located Roxbury as the key location for inner city ministerial education. In 1976, the Boston-campus in Roxbury, the Campus for Urban Ministerial Education (CUME) was founded. Classes were originally held in Haynes' Twelfth Baptist Church. Eldin Villafañe, Dean Borgman, and Stephen Mott were among the first faculty to teach at CUME.

Other former presidents include Robert E. Cooley (1981–1997) who founded the Charlotte campus and Walter Kaiser Jr. (1997–2006). The brief tenure of James Emery White (2006–07) saw White resign in less than a year into his post leading to the interim tenure of Haddon Robinson (2007–08). The President appointed after Robinson's interim post was Dennis Hollinger (2009–2019).

On October 12, 2017, Dennis Hollinger announced his intention to retire on June 30, 2019. Scott Sunquist, an alumnus of Gordon-Conwell and former Dean of the School of Intercultural Studies and Professor of World Christianity at Fuller Theological Seminary in Pasadena, California, succeeded Hollinger as the seventh president in July 2019.

== Campuses and locations ==
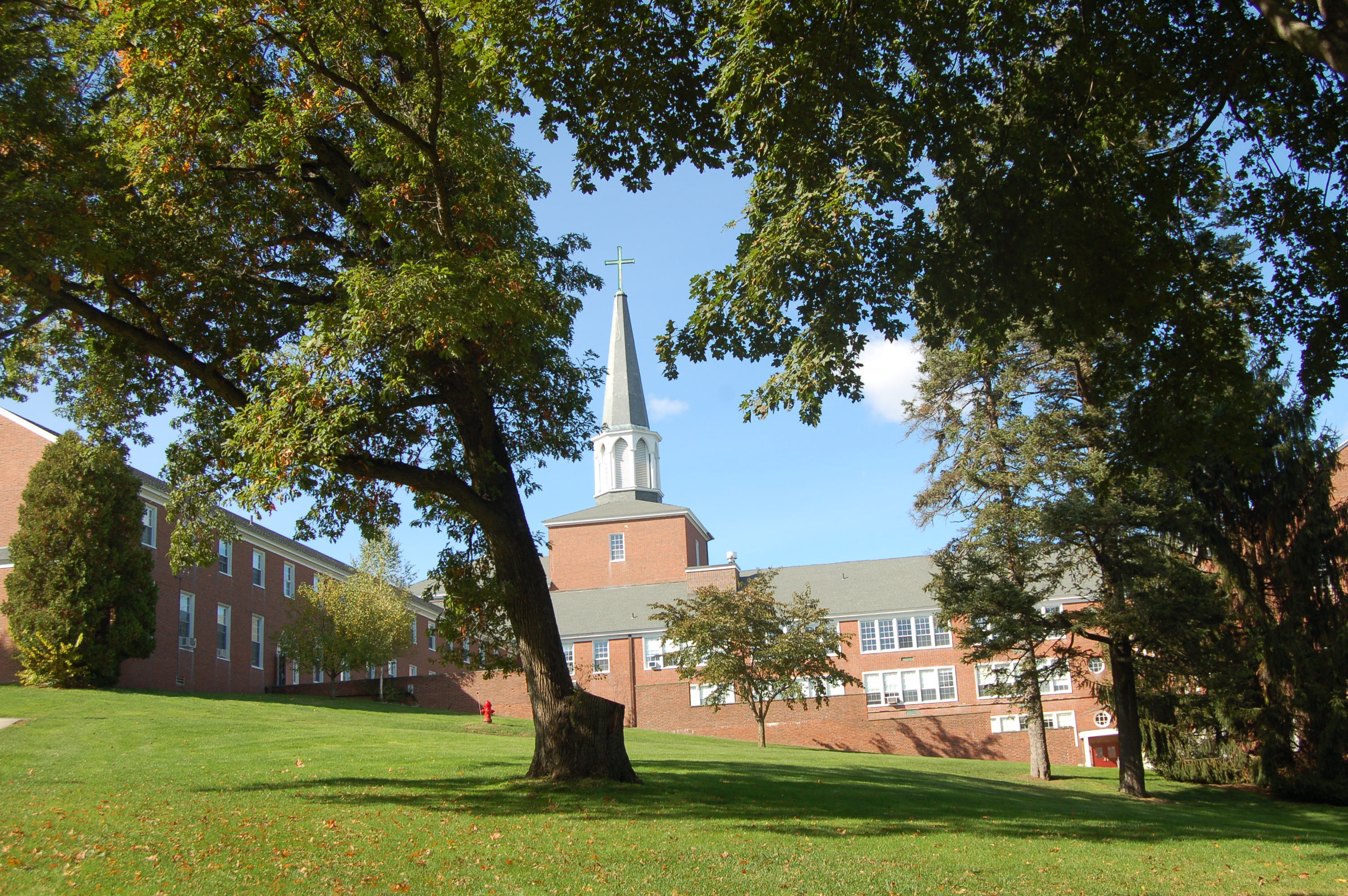
The Kerr building on Gordon-Conwell's Hamilton campus

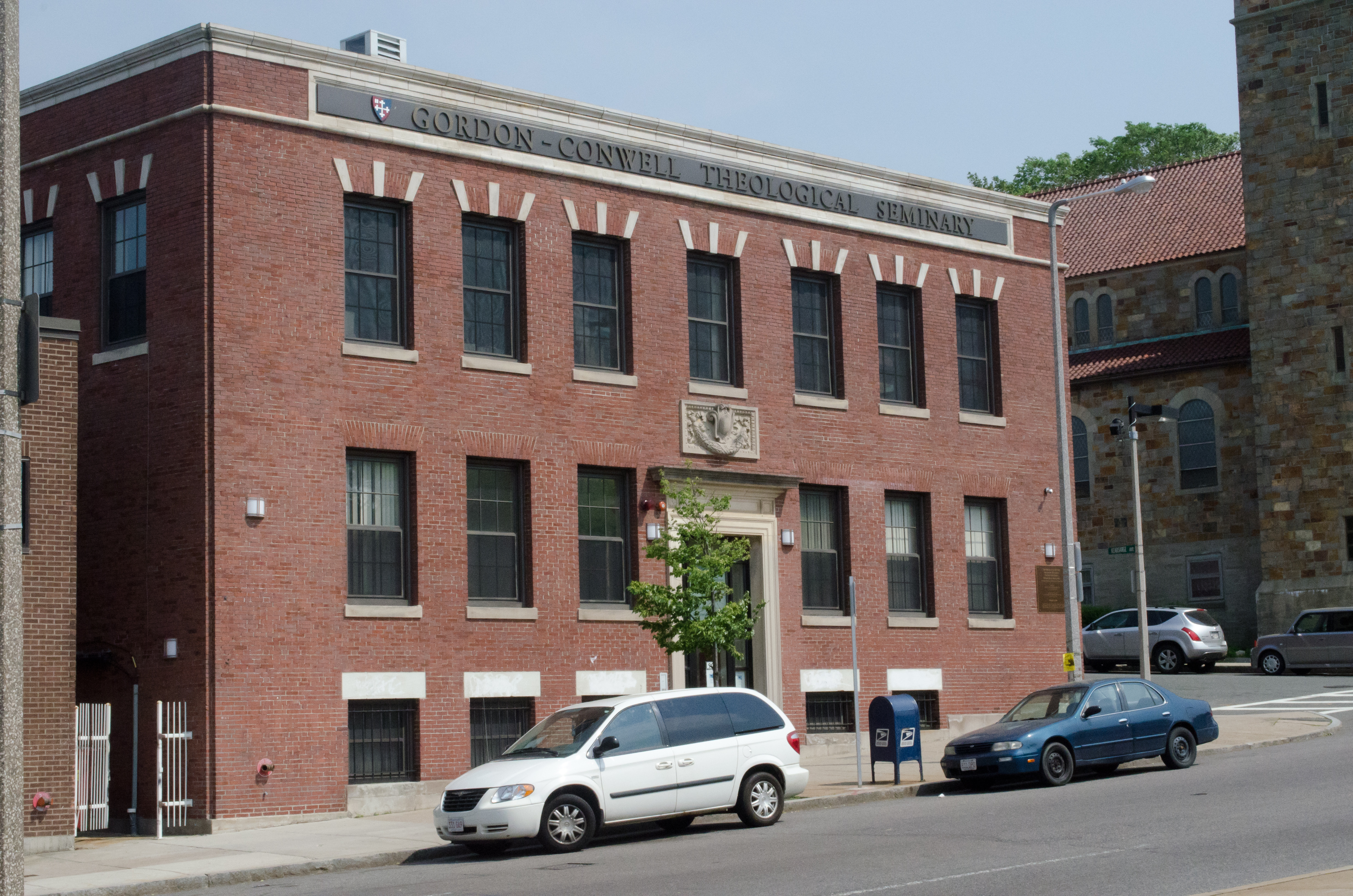
The Center for Urban Ministerial Education in Roxbury, Boston

The main 118-acre (0.48 km^{2}) residential campus is in South Hamilton, Massachusetts. There are additional campuses in Boston, Massachusetts and Charlotte, North Carolina, as well as a location in Jacksonville, Florida. The campus in Boston is known as the Center for Urban Ministerial Education (CUME), and it is a program offered exclusively through part-time night and weekend classes. The CUME campus also focuses primarily on urban and cross-cultural ministry in an urban setting. The Charlotte program was founded in 1992, and it offers courses on weekends, evenings and through week-long intensive courses, and generally attracts an older student body. The Jacksonville location opened in February 2006 as an extension of the Charlotte campus and today operates as a location for the seminary's Networked Education program. The Jacksonville campus is located in downtown Jacksonville, Florida.

On February 2, 2012, the school began renovations of two large rooms in the main administrative and residence building on their South Hamilton campus. The 'Old Book Center' has been transformed into 'Alumni Hall,' a space for events and conferences dedicated to the alumni of Gordon-Conwell. In August 2013, a donor gifted several hand-carved tables, chairs, couches, and art work for the Great Hall. In honor of this donor, the space was renamed the Pierce Great Hall.

On May 16, 2022, Gordon-Conwell announced plans to sell part or all of the South Hamilton campus due to long-term financial health, the effect of the campus, facility maintenance costs, and also acknowledging more remote learning. The following year, the seminary announced that it would be staying on the Hamilton campus and selling its underutilized apartments while continuing to provide student housing for its Life Together initiative.

== Organization ==
Gordon Divinity School and Conwell Theological Seminary were both from the Baptist heritage. When Gordon-Conwell was refounded in 1969, however, the seminary was purposefully founded with no specific Christian denominational affiliation. Today, Gordon-Conwell has students from over 90 different denominations, as well as students from over 40 countries around the world. Theologically, the Statement of Faith and the Mission and Purpose of the seminary are based on Protestant and evangelical doctrines, such as biblical inerrancy.

Gordon-Conwell is part of the Boston Theological Institute (BTI), a consortium of nine theological schools in the Greater Boston area and the Carolina Theological Consortium, a consortium of four theological schools in North and South Carolina.

Gordon-Conwell is overseen by the main administration at the Hamilton campus. Each of the other three campuses is overseen by a campus dean, who reports directly to the Vice President for Academic Affairs and main campus administration.

== Academics ==
As of Fall 2022, 1,330 students were enrolled at Gordon-Conwell. The seminary once offered over 20 degrees but has recently restructured their programs to only offer the Master of Divinity (M.Div.), Master of Theology (Th.M.), Doctor of Ministry (D.Min.), Doctor of Philosophy (Ph.D), and five specialized master's degrees.

Gordon-Conwell has been accredited by the Association of Theological Schools in the United States and Canada since 1964 and by the New England Commission of Higher Education or its predecessor since 1985. Its two counseling programs are also accredited by Council for Accreditation of Counseling and Related Educational Programs. It is also certified by the United States Government for the training of veterans and the education of chaplains for military service.

== Notable faculty ==
=== Current faculty ===
- John Jefferson Davis, Professor of Systematic Theology and Christian Ethics
- Donald Fairbairn, Robert E. Cooley Professor of Early Christianity
- Scott M. Gibson, Haddon Robinson Professor of Preaching
- Dennis Hollinger, President Emeritus; Colman M. Mockler Distinguished Professor of Christian Ethics
- Gordon Hugenberger, Ranked Adjunct Professor of Old Testament
- Richard Lints, Senior Distinguished Professor of Theology
- Sean McDonough, Mary French Rockefeller Distinguished Professor of New Testament
- David Wells, Distinguished Senior Research Professor

=== Former faculty ===
- Haddon Robinson, former Harold John Ockenga Distinguished Professor of Preaching and Senior Director of the Doctor of Ministry Program
- Barry Corey, former Vice President/Chief Academic Officer and Academic Dean
- Gregory Beale, former professor of New Testament and current professor at Reformed Theological Seminary Dallas.
- Walter Kaiser, Jr., emeritus Colman M. Mockler Distinguished Professor of Old Testament and former President
- Meredith G. Kline, former professor of Old Testament
- Elisabeth Elliot, Lecturer and adjunct professor of Christian Expression
- Gordon Fee, former professor of New Testament
- Scott M. Gibson, former Haddon W. Robinson Professor of Preaching
- Catherine Clark Kroeger, former ranked adjunct professor of classical and ministry studies, founder of worldwide organization Christians for Biblical Equality (CBE)
- Richard Lovelace, former professor of Church History
- Alice Palmer Mathews, Lois E. Bennett Distinguished Associate Professor Emerita of Educational Ministries and Women's Ministries
- J. Ramsey Michaels, former professor of New Testament
- Stephen Charles Mott, former professor of Christian Social Ethics
- William D. Mounce, former professor of New Testament
- Roger R. Nicole, former professor of Theology
- Harold Ockenga, former President of Gordon–Conwell Theological Seminary
- Timothy Tennent, former professor of World Missions and Indian Studies
- James Emery White, Ranked Adjunct Professor of Theology and Culture

== Notable alumni ==
- Edwin David Aponte, executive director, the Louisville Institute
- Diana Butler Bass, notable author, blogger, and church historian
- Benjamin L. Corey, notable author and blogger for Patheos
- Mark Dever, pastor of the Capitol Hill Baptist Church in Washington, D.C.
- Kevin DeYoung, author, pastor, assistant professor of Systematic Theology at Reformed Theological Seminary, Charlotte
- Gil Dodds, distance runner and athlete
- Michael Gerald Ford, Baptist minister and oldest child of Gerald R. Ford and Betty Ford
- Robert Godfrey, former president of Westminster Seminary California
- Kimberly Hahn, Catholic apologist and author
- Scott Hahn, Catholic apologist and theologian, Chair of Biblical Theology and the New Evangelization at Franciscan University of Steubenville
- Stephen A. Hayner, former president of Columbia Theological Seminary, pastor, professor, former president of InterVarsity Christian Fellowship
- Donald J. Harlin, Chief of Chaplains of the U.S. Air Force
- Kathy Keller, Christian writer, wife of Tim Keller
- Timothy Keller, pastor, Redeemer Presbyterian Church
- Gary N. Knoppers, John A. O'Brien Professor of Theology at University of Notre Dame
- Brock Kreitzburg, Olympic bobsledder
- Woodrow Kroll, president and Bible teacher for the Back to the Bible radio and television ministry
- William L. Lane, New Testament theologian and professor of biblical studies
- Quigg Lawrence, Anglican bishop
- Neil Lebhar, Anglican bishop
- Esau McCaulley, author and assistant professor of New Testament at Wheaton College, Illinois
- Bill Murdoch, Anglican bishop
- Wendy Murray, journalist
- Roger Nicole, Swiss Reformed theologian
- Felix Orji, bishop of the Anglican Diocese of All Nations
- Robert M. Price, theologian and writer noted for Christ myth theory
- Phillip Sandifer, writer, recording artist
- Talbert W. Swan II, Church Of God In Christ bishop, author, activist
- Timothy Tennent, former president of Asbury Theological Seminary
- Tish Harrison Warren, author of Liturgy of the Ordinary and Anglican priest
- Ben Witherington III, biblical scholar and professor of New Testament studies at Asbury Theological Seminary
- Xiong Yan, a Chinese dissident and a U.S. Army chaplain at the Warrant Officer Career College
