= Capitol Hill Baptist Church =

Coordinates: 38.8907°N 76.9989°W

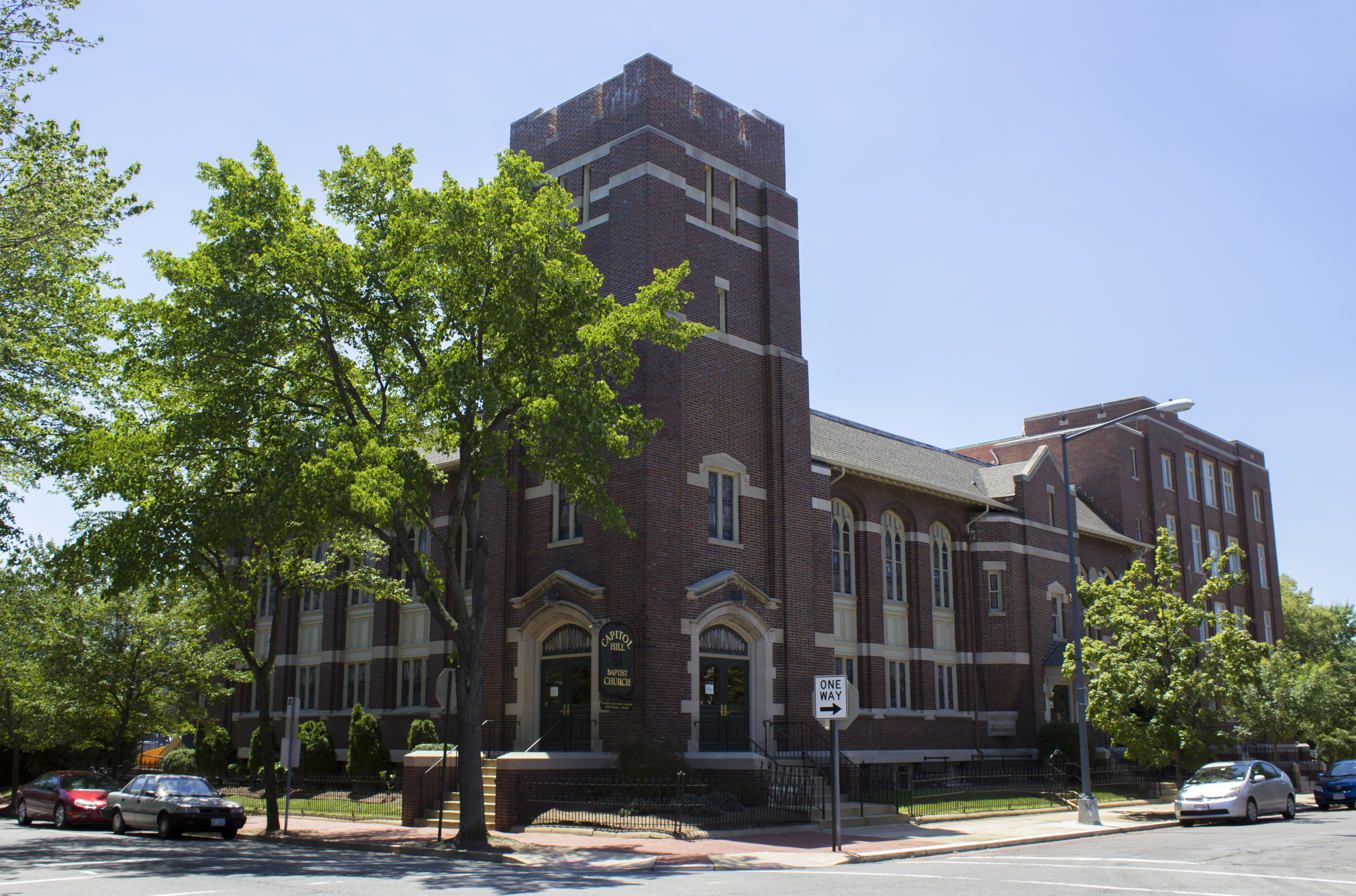
- Capitol Hill Baptist Church
- Location: Washington, D.C.
- Denomination: Baptist
- Website: www.capitolhillbaptist.org

History
- Former name(s): Metropolitan Baptist Church; Capitol Hill Metropolitan Baptist Church
- Founded: 1878

Capitol Hill Baptist Church is a Baptist church located on Capitol Hill in Washington, D.C., six blocks from the United States Capitol. It is affiliated with the Southern Baptist Convention. Mark Dever serves as the senior pastor of the church.

== History ==
Talks to establish a church on Capitol Hill began November 1867, when Celestia Anne Ferris, a member of E Street Baptist Church, called friends to her A street home to pray that a church be established on Capitol Hill.

In 1871, they started a Sunday School at the corner of Seventh and A Streets NE. In 1874 they formed the Metropolitan Baptist Association, for the purpose of raising funds and purchasing a lot on 6th and A Streets NE on which they could erect a building.

On Sunday, February 27, 1878, the Metropolitan Baptist Church was formed with 31 members. Between 1878 and 1882, the church grew to 98 members under pastor Joseph W. Parker.

Church treasurer L.E.F. Spofford and pastor Wilbur Ingersoll convinced the church to take on $7,400 in debt to buy a lot on East Capitol Street for a second, larger building. On October 23, 1884, Ingersoll resigned, along with Spofford and over fifty other members–nearly half of the congregation—and organized a new church, a block and a half away, at 4th and A Streets SE, which they called “East Capitol Street Baptist Church.”

With the help of a young pastor named William H. Young, the church completed their second larger building in 1888, next to the original one on the corner of 6th and A Street NE. Young served as pastor for five years. When he resigned, Metropolitan secured its fifth and most well known pastor, General Green Clay Smith.

From 1895 to 1903, the church was pastored by Granville S. Williams. 1903 marked the arrival of new pastor John Compton Ball, who served as pastor for 41 years, growing the church from 361 members to over 3,000 by the time of his retirement in 1944.

Ball’s successor, K. Owen White, sought to reform the church's membership practices. Despite a membership roll of over 3,000, White suspected that no more than 500 members showed up on any given Sunday. In response, White and the church instituted a five-week "new members class" and dropped 480 names of members who had stopped attending. Another change under White was a closer alignment with the Southern Baptist Convention.

Metropolitan's next pastor was Walter J. Carpenter. Under Carpenter, from 1950-1955, Metropolitan continued to grow in the wake of World War II and served as the host-church for Billy Graham’s evangelistic crusade in Washington DC in 1952.

In 1956, two theologians moved to Washington DC from California. Carl F.H. Henry moved to establish Christianity Today and Walter A. Pegg moved to pastor Capitol Hill Baptist Church.

From 1961 to 1966, the church was pastored by R.B. Culbreth, under whom the church constructed its two parking lots to accommodate suburban members.

From 1971 to 1981, the church was pastored by C. Wade Freeman. During his pastorship, the church constructed another parking lot at the corner of 5th and East Capitol Streets NE. This involved the demolition of a historic neighborhood eatery then owned by the church, Mary's Blue Room. From August 4-7, 1972, a group of protestors blocked the church from demolishing the building, but the building was eventually demolished, despite the protestor resistance and the building's designation as a historic property. This demolition helped spark the passage of the Historic District Preservation Act in 1978.

Freeman resigned on November 8, 1981, to take a position in the Reagan administration. On January 5, 1982, Walt Tomme was installed as the church's new pastor, taking over a church in steep decline.

In 1983, the church opened a Child Development Center, in an effort to engage the local community. In 1988, Tomme resigned from the church, citing difficulties in leadership. From 1990-1993, the church was pastored by Harry Kilbride.

On December 8, 1993, the Church formally called Mark Dever to be the new pastor. On December 7, 1994, the church voted to change their name from Capitol Hill Metropolitan Baptist Church to Capitol Hill Baptist Church (CHBC).

== Pastors ==
- Joseph W. Parker (1879–1882)
- Wilbur H. Ingersoll (1882–1884)
- William H. Young (1885–1890)
- Green Clay Smith (1890–1895)
- Granville S. Williams (1895–1903)
- John Compton Ball (1903–1944)
- K. Owen White (1944–1949)
- Walter Carpenter (1949–1955)
- Walter A. Pegg (1956–1961)
- R.B. Culbreth (1961–1966)
- John Stuckey (1967–1971)
- C. Wade Freeman Jr. (1971–1981)
- Walt Tomme Jr. (1982–1988)
- Harry Kilbride (1990–1993)
- Mark Dever (1994–present)

== Affiliations ==
CHBC is affiliated with the Southern Baptist Convention, and has been described as the "epicenter of the new Calvinism."

== Beliefs ==
CHBC emphasizes the need for a regenerate church membership, and has implemented a church covenant to that end.

Although conservative, Capitol Hill Baptist Church supports the practice of having female deacons.
