= Haddon Robinson =

American evangelical (1931–2017)

Haddon W. Robinson
- Born: 21 March 1931; New York City, New York
- Died: 22 July 2017 (aged 86); Willow Street, Pennsylvania
- Occupations: Pastor, Professor, Theologian
- Notable work: Biblical Preaching
- Spouse: Bonnie
- Children: 2
- Theological work
- Era: 20th Century
- Tradition or movement: Evangelical
- Main interests: Homiletics, Expository preaching
- Notable ideas: "The Big Idea" Biblical Preaching

Haddon W. Robinson (21 March 1931 – 22 July 2017) was an American evangelical who served at Gordon-Conwell Theological Seminary as the Harold John Ockenga Distinguished Professor of Preaching, senior director of the Doctor of Ministry program, and interim president. He was also the founding president of the Theology of Work Project.

== Biography ==
A native of New York City, Robinson received a bachelor's degree from Bob Jones University, a Th.M. from Dallas Theological Seminary, an M.A. from Southern Methodist University, and a Ph.D. from the University of Illinois. Robinson served as president of Denver Conservative Baptist Seminary (now known as Denver Seminary) for 12 years (1979–1991), and taught homiletics on the faculty of Dallas Theological Seminary for 19 years. He authored seven books, including Biblical Preaching, which became a primary source for the study of expository preaching. He wrote and edited for several magazines.

Robinson was heard as the 'lead teacher' on the 15-minute Discover The Word radio program (formerly Radio Bible Class), produced by Grand Rapids, Michigan-based RBC Ministries.

Robinson co-founded the Theology of Work Project and served as the Project's president from its inception in 2007 until his death in 2017.

Robinson lived with his wife, Bonnie, in South Hamilton, Massachusetts, and Willow Street, Pennsylvania. They had two children. Robinson died from Parkinson's disease.

One of his major contributions to homiletics was the "Big Idea of Biblical Preaching" (the title of a book in his honor), whereby sermons should have one major idea (one subject and one complement), even if the big idea breaks down into several subpoints. Robinson also argued that a sermon should be primarily expository, since that places the authority in the biblical text, not in the preachers themselves. He was instrumental in changing the name of Denver Conservative Baptist Seminary to Denver Seminary.

== Works ==
=== Books ===
- Robinson, Haddon W. (1980). Biblical Preaching: The Development and Delivery of Expository Messages (1st ed.). Grand Rapids, MI: Baker Academics. ISBN 978-0-801-07700-5. OCLC 6982350.
- ——— (1987). The Good Shepherd: Reflections on Psalm 23. Chicago, IL: Moody Press. ISBN 978-0-802-46688-4.
- ——— (1988). Christian Salt and Light Company: A Contemporary Study of the Sermon on the Mount. Grand Rapids, MI: Discovery House. ISBN 978-0-929-23902-6. OCLC 19044714.
- ———, ed. (1989). Biblical Sermons: How Twelve Preachers Apply the Principles of Biblical Preaching. Grand Rapids, MI: Baker Book House. ISBN 978-0-801-07751-7. OCLC 19389127.
- ——— (1989). Solid Rock Construction Company: How to Build Your Life on the Right Foundation. Grand Rapids, MI: Discovery House. ISBN 978-0-929-23908-8.
- ———; Hybels, Bill; Briscoe, Stuart (1990). Mastering Contemporary Preaching. Portland, OR: Multnomah. ISBN 978-0-880-70335-2. OCLC 20560630.
- ——— (1991). What Jesus Said About Successful Living: Principles From the Sermon on the Mount for Today (Barbour Publishing, 1991. Discovery House Publishers. ISBN 978-0-929-23943-9. OCLC 23768838. - combined edition of Christian Salt and Light Company & Solid Rock Construction Company
- ———; Brown, Stephen W.; Willimon, William H. (1993). Voice in the Wilderness: Clear Preaching in a Complicated World. Mastering Ministry's Pressure Points. Sisters, OR: Multnomah. ISBN 978-0-880-70589-9. OCLC 29506380.
- ——— (1996). Grief: Comfort for Those Who Grieve and Those Who Want to Help. Grand Rapids, MI: Discovery House. ISBN 978-1572933132. OCLC 4356948.
- ——— (1998). Decision-Making by the Book: How to Choose Wisely in an Age of Options. Grand Rapids, MI: Discovery House. ISBN 978-0-896-93913-4. OCLC 23689908.
- ——— (2001). Biblical Preaching: The Development and Delivery of Expository Messages (2nd ed.). Grand Rapids, MI: Baker Academics. ISBN 978-0-801-02262-3. OCLC 925010235.
- ——— (2002). Gibson, Scott M. (ed.). Making a Difference in Preaching. Grand Rapids, MI: Baker Books. ISBN 978-0-801-09092-9. OCLC 41649710.
- ——— (2002). Trusting the Shepherd: Insights from Psalm 23. Grand Rapids, MI: Discovery House. ISBN 978-1572930704.
- ———; Robinson, Torrey W. (2003). It's All How You Tell It: Preaching First-Person Expository Messages. Grand Rapids, MI: Baker Book House. ISBN 978-1572930704.
- ——— (2005). The Art and Craft of Biblical Preaching: A Comprehensive Resource for Today's Communicators. Grand Rapids, MI: Zondervan. ISBN 978-0-310-25248-1. OCLC 55877836.
- ——— (2014). Biblical Preaching: The Development and Delivery of Expository Messages (3rd ed.). Grand Rapids, MI: Baker Academics. ISBN 9780801049125. OCLC 865452254.
