= Denver Seminary =

American Evangelical Christian seminary

Coordinates: 39°36′2.18″N 105°1′20.56″W

- Type: Private seminary
- Established: 1950
- Religious affiliation: Evangelical Christian
- Endowment: $12.2 million
- President: Mark Husbands
- Faculty: 31 (Spring 2021)
- Location: Littleton, Colorado, United States
- Website: www.denverseminary.edu

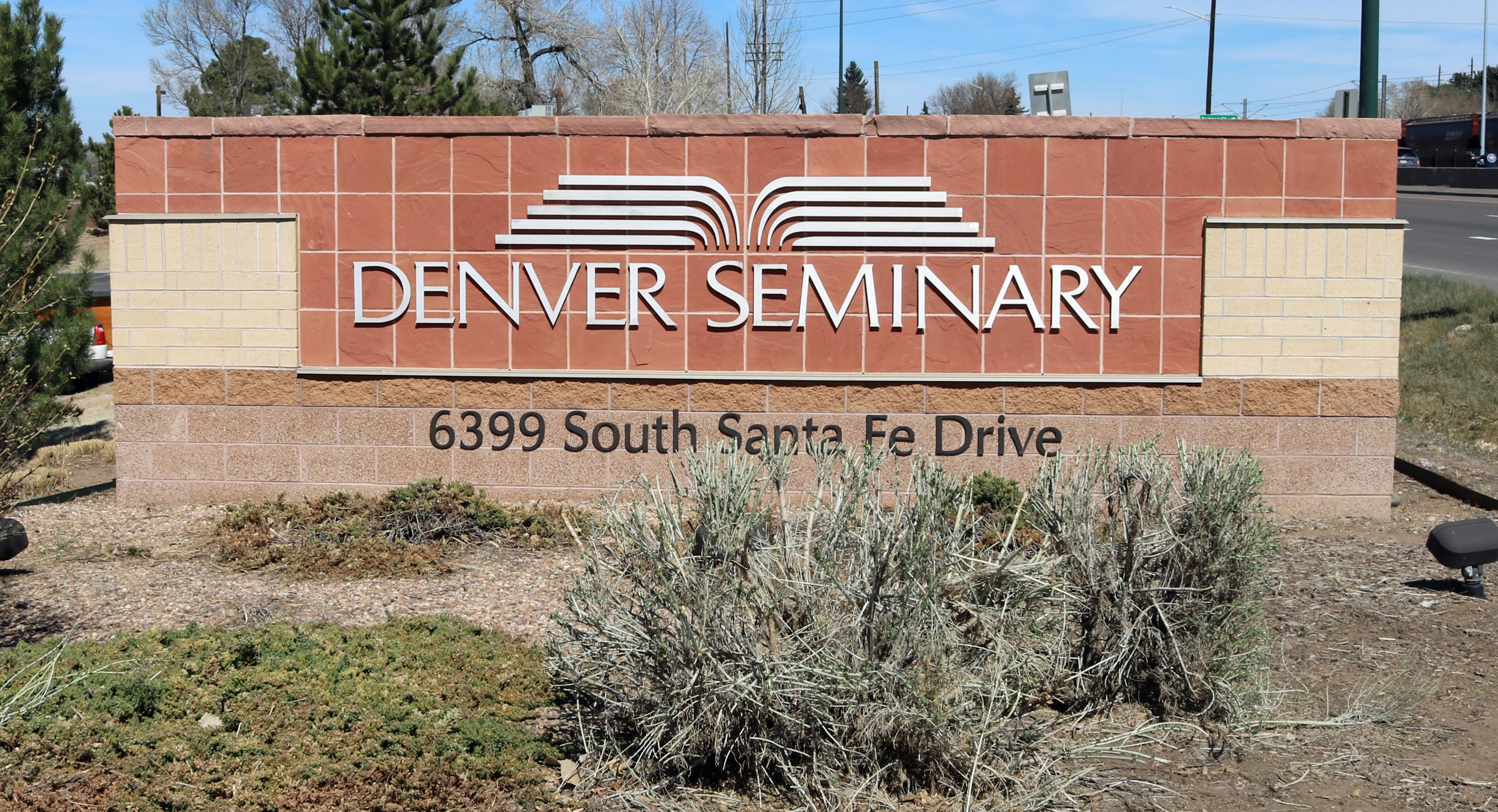
The sign at the seminary entrance.

Denver Seminary is a private, evangelical Christian seminary with its main campus in Littleton, Colorado.

It includes a campus in Colorado, an extension campus in Washington, DC, and an online campus. It offers Masters programs in Arts, Divinity, and Theology, as well as a Doctorate in Ministry, along with counseling courses. In 2021, it enrolled over 1200 students from over 35 denominations.

== History ==
In 1950, Denver Seminary was founded by members of the newly founded Conservative Baptist Association. This is a group of churches that separated from the Northern Baptist Convention over theological differences stemming from the fundamentalist–modernist controversy conflict earlier in the 20th century. The school was originally known as the Conservative Baptist Theological Seminary and was based in Englewood, Colorado. Carey Thomas became the Seminary's first president.

In 1956, Vernon Grounds was appointed as the second president and remained so until 1979.

In June 1962, the seminary was granted associate membership in the American Association of Theological Schools (now the Association of Theological Schools). Full ATS accreditation was achieved in 1971.

In 1972, full accreditation to the North Central Association of Colleges and Secondary Schools was achieved.

In 1982, the seminary changed its name to Denver Conservative Baptist Seminary.

In 1996, Clyde McDowell, the fifth president, introduced a program of training and mentoring for which Denver Seminary has become well known. During his time, the institute became the first seminary ever to receive accreditation by the Council for Accreditation of Counseling and Related Education Programs (CACREP) for its counseling degree program. The institute is also accredited by the Association for Clinical Pastoral Education.

In 1998, the seminary changed its name to Denver Seminary. This was a reflection of its growing appeal to a wide-spectrum of evangelical students.

In 2002, Bruce Shelly, the Senior Professor of Church History, authored a biography on Grounds titled Transformed by Love:The Vernon Grounds Story. This book gives a comprehensive overview of Denver Seminary's history as it developed from a small denominational school to a major evangelical seminary under Grounds' leadership.

In 2005, under the leadership of President Craig Williford, the seminary moved to a new campus in Littleton, Colorado, where the school currently resides. Built from the ground up specifically for the Seminary, the campus includes teaching and leadership facilities and nearly 100 student apartments. The campus is situated next to the South Platte River.

The seminary had a campus in West Texas for a time, but this has now closed.

== Presidents ==
No.	Name	Term	Tenure
1	Carey S. Thomas	1950–1956	6 yrs
2	Vernon C. Grounds	1956–1979	23 yrs
3	Haddon Robinson	1979–1991	12 yrs
– (Note: Position vacant)	–	1991–1993	2 yrs
4	Edward L. Hayes	1993–1996	3 yrs
5	Clyde McDowell	1996–1999	3 yrs
– (Note: Served as interim president)	Leith Anderson	1999–2001	2 yrs
6	G. Craig Williford	2001–2008	7 yrs
– (Note: Position vacant)	–	2008–2009	1 yr
7	Mark Young	2009–2024	15 yrs
8	Mark Husbands	2025–present	(incumbent)

== Accreditation ==
Denver Seminary is accredited by Association of Theological Schools in the United States and Canada, Higher Learning Commission, the Association for Clinical Pastoral Education, and the Council for Accreditation of Counseling and Related Education Programs (CACREP).

The seminary adheres to the National Association of Evangelicals Statement of Faith; students are required to sign the NAE statement of faith.

== Theological stance ==
The evangelical theological stance of Denver Seminary is demonstrated by the words of the late chancellor Vernon Grounds:

Here is no unanchored liberalism, freedom to think without commitment. Here is no encrusted dogmatism, commitment without freedom to think. Here is a vibrant evangelicalism, commitment with freedom to think within the limits laid down in Scripture.

This statement was first used by Grounds to stake out Denver Seminary's theological position in the midst of conflict between moderately conservative and ultra-conservative factions of the Conservative Baptist Association that eventually led the ultra-conservative faction to withdraw from the CBA and found the Conservative Baptist Fellowship (CBF). Grounds, formerly the academic dean of fundamentalist Baptist seminary in New York state affiliated with the General Association of Regular Baptist Churches, eventually became a key spokesperson for the evangelical movement that attributes its roots to the writings of Carl F. H. Henry. Under his leadership, Denver Seminary became firmly rooted in this theological camp.

== Publications ==
Since 1998, Old Testament professor Richard Hess has edited the Denver Journal: An Online Review of Current Biblical and Theological Studies. This is primarily an electronic journal that provides Denver Seminary faculty an opportunity to publish book reviews on the latest theological scholarship.

Engage Magazine is published biannually since 2013. The magazine features articles written by faculty addressing current topics in the church and ministry as well as stories of students and alumni. It is distributed to Denver Seminary alumni, students, staff, faculty, donors, and friends.

== Library ==
The Carey S. Thomas library is the largest evangelical Protestant library between Chicago and Los Angeles. It is composed of carefully selected volumes of the best in theological and scholarly literature to support the school's curriculum. The present collection totals approximately 185,000 volumes, both in print and electronic format, and is located in the main library in Littleton, Colorado and in the extension campus libraries in Washington DC.
