= J. Ramsey Michaels =

American theologian and academic (1931 – 2020)

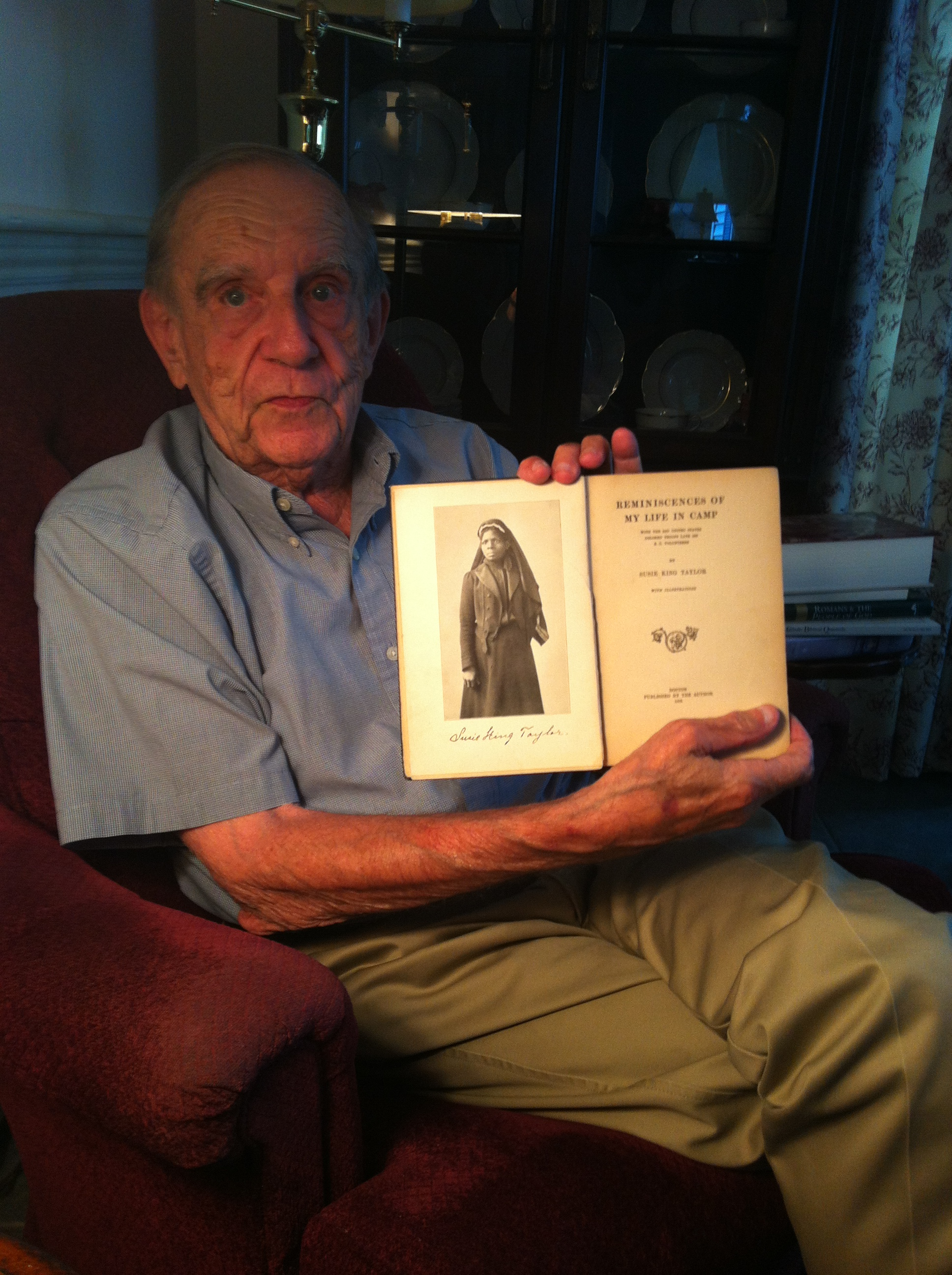

J. Ramsey Michaels, Th.D., Harvard (May 1, 1931 – January 18, 2020) was an American theologian who was for many years a professor at Gordon-Conwell Theological Seminary and Southwest Missouri State University. He continued to teach occasionally as an adjunct professor at Bangor Theological Seminary in Portland, Maine, and as a visiting professor at Fuller Theological Seminary in Pasadena. He is perhaps best known for his commentary on John which is a replacement volume in the New International Commentary on the New Testament series.

== Early life and education ==
J. Ramsey Michaels was born on May 1, 1931, in Skaneateles, New York. He graduated from Princeton University with a baccalaureate degree, Grace Theological Seminary with a bachelor of divinity (B.D.) degree, Westminster Theological Seminary with a masters of theology degree (Th.M.), and Harvard Divinity School where he received a doctorate of theology (Th.D.).

== Career ==
After teaching at Gordon-Conwell Theological Seminary for 25 years, the faculty senate issued a report criticizing Michaels' view of inerrancy based on his book Servant and Son. After being informed by the president at the time, Robert E. Cooley, that he was about to be fired, Michaels resigned in the spring of 1983. Soon after he took a teaching position at Southwest Missouri State University.

Michaels published commentaries on Revelation, Hebrews and the Gospel of John. The latter replaced Leon Morris' commentary in the New International Commentary on the New Testament series. Michaels published scholarly articles including "Charles Thomson and the First American New Testament" in the Harvard Theological Review and "A World with Devils Filled: The Hawkes-O'Connor Debate Revisited" in the Flannery O'Connor Review.

Dr. Michaels was also part of the translation team for the New Living Translation of the Holy Bible. He worked with Peter Davids of St. Stephen's University, Norman Ericson of Wheaton College, and William Lane of Seattle Pacific University on the translations of the New Testament texts of Hebrews, James, 1 Peter, 2 Peter, and Jude.

One of his final books was published in 2013 and was entitled Passing by the Dragon: The Biblical Tales of Flannery O'Connor (Wipf & Stock publishers).

== Personal life and death ==
Michaels was married to Betty L. Michaels and had four children. He died on January 18, 2020, in Portsmouth, New Hampshire.

== Selected works ==
- Michaels, J. Ramsey. The New Testament Speaks.
- Michaels, J. Ramsey. Servant and Son.
- Michaels, J. Ramsey (1988). 1 Peter. Word Biblical Commentary. Vol. 49. Nashville: Thomas Nelson. ISBN 978-0-8499-0248-2.
- Michaels, J. Ramsey (2010). The Gospel of John. New International Commentary on the New Testament. Grand Rapids: Eerdmans. ISBN 978-0-8028-2302-1.
- Michaels, J. Ramsey. Interpreting the Book of Revelation. ISBN 0801062934.
- Michaels, J. Ramsey. Passing by the Dragon. ISBN 1620322234.
