= Peter Enns =

American Biblical scholar and theologian (born 1961)

Peter Eric Enns
- Born: January 2, 1961 (age 65); Passaic, New Jersey, U.S.
- Title: Abram S. Clemens professor of biblical studies
- Spouse: Susan (m.1984-div.2025)
- Children: 3

Academic background
- Education: Harvard University
- Thesis: (1994)

Academic work
- Era: Contemporary
- Discipline: Biblical studies
- Institutions: Eastern University (St. Davids, Pennsylvania)
- Main interests: Old Testament, Wisdom literature, Hermeneutics

Peter Eric Enns (born January 2, 1961) is an American Biblical scholar and theologian. He has written widely on hermeneutics, Christianity and science, historicity of the Bible, and Old Testament interpretation. Outside of his academic work Enns is a contributor to HuffPost and Patheos. He has also worked with Francis Collins' The BioLogos Foundation. His book Inspiration and Incarnation challenged conservative/mainstream Evangelical methods of biblical interpretation. His book The Evolution of Adam questions the belief that Adam was a historical figure.

== Biography ==
Enns was born in Passaic, New Jersey, on January 2, 1961, to German-American immigrant parents. He grew up in River Vale, New Jersey, and graduated from Pascack Valley High School (Hillsdale, New Jersey) in 1978. He graduated from Messiah College in Grantham, Pennsylvania (1982), obtained an M.Div. from Westminster Theological Seminary in Philadelphia, Pennsylvania (1989), and an M.A. (1993) and Ph.D. (1994) from Harvard University (Near Eastern Languages and Civilizations).

Enns returned to Westminster Theological Seminary in 1994 to begin his teaching career. He was tenured in 2000 and promoted to full professor in 2005 as a professor of Old Testament and Biblical hermeneutics. Among other duties, he served as Associate Academic Dean from 1998 to 2001, chair of the Hermeneutics (Ph.D.) Field Committee (1997–2000), and edited the Westminster Theological Journal (2000–2005). His publication of the book Inspiration and Incarnation led to institutional strife and the eventual loss of Enns's teaching position at Westminster Theological Seminary by 2009.

Enns was a senior fellow of Biblical studies with the BioLogos Foundation, a Christian organization that "explores, promotes, and celebrates the integration of science and Christian faith". He wrote nearly 100 blog posts at the BioLogos Forum, Science and the Sacred. He also has written several pieces for The Huffington Post's religion section.

Enns is a member of the Society of Biblical Literature and has served on the Wisdom in Israel and Cognate Literature Session steering committee since 2006. He is also a member of the Institute for Biblical Research, where he served on the board of directors from 2004 to 2007 and the editorial board for the Bulletin for Biblical Research from 2002 to 2004.

In 2017, Enns launched the Bible For Normal People Podcast (B4NP) together with Jared Byas. In the weekly podcast, mainly theologians, but also musicians and journalists are invited and interviewed on biblical topics. Guests of the podcast so far have included Rob Bell, Richard Rohr, Brian McLaren, Jodi Magness, Rachel Held Evans, Bart D. Ehrman, Nadia Bolz-Weber, Jon D. Levenson and Kristin Kobes Du Mez.

Enns is currently the Abram S. Clemens professor of biblical studies at Eastern University (St. Davids, Pennsylvania).

Enns resides in southeastern Pennsylvania.

== Academic work ==
Enns's academic interests include Old Testament theology, Biblical Theology, Wisdom Literature (especially Ecclesiastes), the New Testament use of the Old Testament, Second Temple literature, and the general issue of how the historical context of the Bible affects how the nature of Scripture is understood within Reformed tradition and Evangelical commitments. He has written many articles, essays, dictionary and encyclopedia entries, and book reviews on varied topics surrounding the Old Testament and its interpretation (see "Books" and "Articles and Essays" below). His 2008 edited volume (with Tremper Longman III), Dictionary of the Old Testament: Wisdom, Poetry, and Writings (IVP), won the Christianity Today "Award of Merit" for 2009 and the Evangelical Christian Publishers Association’s "2009 Christian Book of the Year" award in the Bible Reference and Study category. His 2012 publication, The Evolution of Adam: What the Bible Does and Doesn't Say about Human origins, won the gold award in the Religion category of the 2012 ForeWord Reviews Book of the Year Awards. Enns has also contributed to a Bible curriculum for grades 1–12 Telling God's Story, and a book on the hermeneutical implications of the discussion between Christianity and science. He has also taught courses at Princeton Theological Seminary, Harvard University, Fuller Theological Seminary, Eastern University, and Biblical Theological Seminary.

== Inspiration and Incarnation ==
Enns garnered significant attention for his 2005 book Inspiration and Incarnation: Evangelicals and the Problem of the Old Testament. His stated purpose for writing the book is "to bring an evangelical doctrine of Scripture into conversation with the implications generated by some important themes in modern biblical scholarship—particularly the Old Testament—over the past 150 years". Enns's primary audience is those readers who find it difficult to maintain their faith in God because "familiar and conventional" evangelical approaches often mishandle the challenges raised by modern biblical scholarship. Enns writes that evangelicals commonly take a defensive posture to new ideas, and that such defenses are "exercises in special pleading, attempts to hold on to comfortable ideas despite evidence that makes such ideas problematic. It is precisely the ineffectiveness of certain ways of thinking about the Bible that can sometimes cause significant cognitive dissonance for Christians who love and want to hold on to their Bible, but who also feel the weight of certain kinds of evidence".

Enns looks at three issues raised in modern biblical scholarship that he feels are mishandled by Evangelicals: (1) the strong similarities between the Old Testament and the literature of other ancient societies; (2), theological diversity among the Old Testament authors; (3) how New Testament writers interpreted the Old Testament in inventive ways that reflect Jewish practices of the time.

In all three cases, the Bible behaves in ways that don't seem very inspired, but rather very human. Enns argues for an incarnational understanding of the Bible as a way to take seriously these types of challenges. This model draws an analogy between Jesus and the Bible: "In the same way that Jesus is—must be—both God and human, the Bible is also a divine and human book". The Bible is not "an abstract, otherworldly book, dropped out of heaven. It was connected to and therefore spoke to those ancient cultures....precisely because Christianity is a historical religion, God’s word reflects the various historical moments in which Scripture was written". Enns feels that the problems raised by the "human dimension" of the Bible for many evangelicals "has less to do with the Bible itself and more to do with our own preconceptions" of how the Bible ought to be. Enns advocates an incarnational model to help evangelicals reorient their expectations of Scripture and so come to peace with new developments in their understanding of the Bible.

Inspiration and Incarnation has been endorsed by such notable scholars as Hugh G. M. Williamson, Bill T. Arnold, David W. Baker, Tremper Longman III, Joel Green and others for its creative approach to solving the modern problem of the Bible. While initially commending the book, Bruce Waltke later backtracked his book blurb and expressed some noted disagreement with Enns' views on biblical inerrancy. It has also met with criticism by D. A. Carson, Paul Helm, and G. K. Beale, who claim it abandons the traditional evangelical doctrine of biblical inerrancy. The book was the cause of controversy at Enns' institution (Westminster Seminary), with a slight majority of the faculty supporting Enns while a slight majority of the Board of Directors disagreed with him. Enns would eventually resign his teaching position in September 2008.

Baker Books released the 10th-anniversary edition of Inspiration and Incarnation in the summer of 2015, which includes an essay on the reception and continued impact of the book.

== Suspension from Westminster Theological Seminary ==
Enns's book, Inspiration and Incarnation: Evangelicals and the Problem of the Old Testament, proved controversial at Westminster Theological Seminary (WTS). WTS President Peter Lillback said that it "has caught the attention of the world so that we have scholars that love this book, and scholars who have criticized it very deeply.... We have students who have read it say it has liberated them. We have other students that say it's crushing their faith and removing them from their hope. We have churches that are considering it, and two Presbyteries have said they will not send students to study under Professor Enns here."

The general content of Inspiration and Incarnation was taught by Enns over his fourteen-year teaching career at Westminster Theological Seminary. It was only after the book's publication in 2005 that a lengthy controversy ensued in the wake of major administrative changes, most notably the election of Peter Lillback as president in 2005. The main point of contention was whether the book was within the theological boundaries of the Westminster Confession of Faith. Westminster faculty members take an oath that their teaching will be in line with that confession.

Lillback initiated a series of regular faculty meetings ("Faculty Theology Fellowship") to discuss Enns and his book. Those meetings, moderated by Lillback, took place over a two-year period and led to the preparation of two written reports, at Lillback's direction, to aid the faculty in determining whether or not Enns was in violation of his oath. (Although Westminster has had a board of trustees for some time, it has historically been governed by its faculty, particularly in theological matters.) These reports were written by the two field committees: the Historical and Theological Field Committee, composed of faculty members generally opposed to Enns's book, and the Hermeneutics Field Committee, composed of members generally favorable towards Enns's ideas. After both committees reported their findings in the form of written reports, as well as written response by each committee to the other's report, faculty members William Edgar and Michael Kelly prepared a motion (known as the Edgar-Kelly Motion) declaring that Enns's writing and teaching were within the bounds of his faculty oath. All official documents used in these faculty debates, including both field committee reports and the Edgar-Kelly Motion, can be downloaded from the Westminster Theological Seminary web site here. The motion was approved by the faculty, 12–8, in December 2007. Despite the work of these committees and the resulting faculty vote, President Lillback referred the matter immediately to the board of trustees.

On March 26, 2008, the board of trustees at Westminster Theological Seminary voted 18–9 to suspend Enns from his position effective May 23, 2008. Though the faculty voted 12–8 that the work falls within the parameters of the Westminster Confession of Faith, the chairman of the Board said that a majority of the members on the Board at that time felt the book was incompatible with the Confession. As of August 1, 2008, Enns and the seminary agreed to part ways. Following the Board's vote, nine trustees resigned from the board.

== Selected works ==
=== Thesis ===
- Enns, Peter E. (1994). Exodus Retold (Ph.D.). Harvard University.

=== Books ===
- ——— (1997). Poetry and Wisdom. IBR Bibliographies. Grand Rapids, MI: Baker. ISBN 978-0-8010-2161-9. OCLC 37457860.
- ——— (1997). Exodus Retold: Ancient Exegesis of the Departure from Egypt in Wis 10:15-21 and 19:1-9. Harvard Semitic Museum Monographs. Vol. 57. Atlanta, GA: Scholars Press. ISBN 978-0-7885-0403-7. OCLC 37465235. - revision of doctoral dissertation of 1994
- ——— (2000). Exodus: from biblical text ... to contemporary life. NIV Application Commentary. Grand Rapids, MI: Zondervan. ISBN 978-0-340-75660-7. OCLC 42690109.
- ——— (2005). Inspiration and Incarnation: Evangelicals and the Problem of the Old Testament. Grand Rapids, MI: Baker. ISBN 978-0-8010-2730-7. OCLC 57283747.
- ——— (2006). Invitation to Genesis: a Short-Term Disciple Bible Study. Nashville, TN: Abingdon Press. ISBN 978-0-687-49492-7. OCLC 904209493.
- ——— (2010). Telling God's Story: a parent's guide to teaching the Bible. Charles City, VA: Olive Branch Books. ISBN 9781933339467. OCLC 601107614.
- ——— (2011). Ecclesiastes. Two Horizons Old Testament Commentary. Grand Rapids, MI: Eerdmans. ISBN 9780802866493. OCLC 719426755.
- ———; Brettler, Marc Zvi; Harrington, Daniel J. (2012). The Bible and the Believer: How to Read the Bible Critically and Religiously. Oxford & New York: Oxford University Press. ISBN 978-0199863006. OCLC 777327394.
- ——— (2012). The Evolution of Adam: What the Bible Does and Doesn't Say about Human Origins. Grand Rapids, MI: Brazos Press. ISBN 978-1587433153. OCLC 729346790.
- ———; Byas, Jared (2012). Genesis for Normal People: A Guide to the Most Controversial, Misunderstood, and Abused Book of the Bible. Englewood, CO: Patheos Press. ISBN 978-1939221032. OCLC 823929930.
- ——— (2014). The Bible Tells Me So: Why Defending Scripture Has Made Us Unable to Read It. San Francisco, CA: HarperOne. ISBN 978-0-06-227202-7. OCLC 903675129.
- ——— (2016). The Sin of Certainty: Why God Desires Our Trust More than Our 'Correct' Beliefs. New York, NY: HarperOne. ISBN 978-0062272089. OCLC 928023910.
- ——— (2019). How the Bible Actually Works: In Which I Explain How An Ancient, Ambiguous, and Diverse Book Leads Us to Wisdom Rather Than Answers -- and Why That's Great News. San Francisco, CA: Harper Collins. ISBN 978-0062686749. OCLC 1037294406.

=== Edited by ===
- ———; Longman III, Tremper, eds. (2008). Dictionary of the Old Testament: Wisdom, Poetry, and Writings. IVP Bible dictionary series. Vol. 3. Downers Grove, IL: IVP Academic. ISBN 978-0-8308-1783-2. OCLC 196302306.
- ———; Longman III, Tremper; Strauss, Mark L., eds. (2012). Baker Illustrated Bible Dictionary. Grand Rapids, MI: Baker. ISBN 9780801012976. OCLC 871635950.

=== Chapters ===
- ——— (1996). "Law of God". In VanGemeren, Willem A. (ed.). New International Dictionary of Old Testament Theology and Exegesis. Vol. 4. Grand Rapids, MI: Zondervan. pp. 893–900. OCLC 862711900.
- ——— (1997). "The Interpretation of Psalm 95 in Hebrews 3.1-4.13". In Evans, Craig A.; Sanders, James A. (eds.). Early Christian Interpretation of the Scriptures of Israel: Investigations and Proposals. Journal for the Study of the New Testament - Supplement Series. Vol. 148. Sheffield, UK: Sheffield Academic Press. pp. 352–63. ISBN 9781850756798. OCLC 782324273. - partial republishing of the article "Creation and Re-creation: Psalm 95 and its Interpretation in Hebrews 3:7-4:13" (see below)
- ——— (1998). "A Retelling of the Song at the Sea in Wis 10,20-21". In Evans, Craig A.; Sanders, James A. (eds.). The Function of Scripture in Early Jewish and Christian Tradition. Journal for the Study of the New Testament - Supplement Series. Vol. 154. Sheffield, UK: Sheffield Academic Press. pp. 142–65. ISBN 9781850758303. OCLC 782496047. - republishing of the 1995 article. (see below)
- ——— (2000). "Expansions of Scripture,"". In Carson, D. A.; O'Brien, Peter T.; Seifrid, Mark A. (eds.). Justification and Variegated Nomism: Volume I: The complexities of second temple Judaism. Tünbingen: Mohr Siebeck. pp. 73–98. ISBN 9783161469947. OCLC 949157509.
- ——— (2000). "Wisdom of Solomon and Biblical Interpretation in the Second Temple Period". In Packer, J. I.; Soderlund, Sven K. (eds.). The Way of Wisdom: Essays in Honor of Bruce K. Waltke. Grand Rapids, MI: Zondervan. pp. 212–25. ISBN 9780310864608. OCLC 903689880.
- ——— (2003). "col haadam and the Evaluation of Qohelet's Wisdom in Qoh 12:13, or The 'A is so, and What's More, B' Theology of Ecclesiastes". The Idea of Biblical Interpretation: essays in honor of James L. Kugel. Supplements to the Journal for the Study of Judaism. Vol. 83. Leiden: E. J. Brill. pp. 125–37. ISBN 9781589833876. OCLC 260231108.
- ——— (2009). "Fuller meaning, single goal: a christotelic approach to the New Testament's use of the Old in its first-century interpretive environment". In Berding, Kenneth; Lunde, Jonathan (eds.). Three views on the New Testament use of the Old Testament. Counterpoints. Grand Rapids, MI: Zondervan. pp. 167–217. ISBN 9780310590514. OCLC 807233888.
- ——— (2012). "Pseudo-Solomon and His Scripture: Biblical Interpretation in the Wisdom of Solomon". In Henze, Matthias (ed.). A Companion to Biblical Interpretation in Early Judaism. Grand Rapids, MI: Eerdmans. pp. 389–414. ISBN 9780802803887. OCLC 780137278.

=== Journal articles ===
- ——— (1993). "Creation and Re-creation: Psalm 95 and its Interpretation in Hebrews 3:7-4:13]". Westminster Theological Journal. 55: 255–80.
- ——— (1995). "A Retelling of the Song at the Sea in Wis 10,20-21". Biblica. 76: 1–24.
- ——— (1996). "The 'Moveable Well' in 1 Cor 10:4: An Extra-Biblical Tradition in an Apostolic Text". Bulletin for Biblical Research. 6: 23–38. doi:10.5325/bullbiblrese.6.1.0023. S2CID 246626073.
- ———; McCartney, Daniel (2001). "Matthew and Hosea: A Response to John Sailhamer". Westminster Theological Journal. 63: 97–105.
- ——— (September 2002). "William Henry Green and the Authorship of the Pentateuch: Some Historical Considerations". Journal of the Evangelical Theological Society. 45 (3): 385–403.
- ——— (Fall 2003). "Apostolic Hermeneutics and an Evangelical Doctrine of Scripture: Moving beyond the Modernist Impasse". Westminster Theological Journal. 65 (2): 263–287.
- ——— (2005). "Some Thoughts on Theological Exegesis of the Old Testament: Toward a Viable Model of Biblical Coherence and Relevance". Reformation and Revival Journal. 14 (4): 81–104.
- ——— (2006). "Response to G. K. Beale's Review of Inspiration and Incarnation: Evangelicals and the Problem of the Old Testament". Journal of the Evangelical Theological Society. 49 (2): 313–26.
- ——— (2006). "Bible in Context: The Continuing Vitality of Reformed Biblical Scholarship". Westminster Theological Journal. 68: 203–18.
- ——— (2007). "Response to Professor Greg Beale". Themelios. 32 (3): 5–13.
- ——— (2007). "Exodus, the Problem of Historiography, and Some Theological Reflections". Act 3 Review. 15 (4).
- ——— (2007). "Preliminary Observations on an Incarnational Model of Scripture: Its Viability and Usefulness". Calvin Theological Journal. 42: 219–36.

=== Other articles ===
- "Yankees and Westminster: Personal Reflections on Tradition" (PDF). Peter Enns Online. 1998. Archived from the original (PDF) on February 11, 2012. - unpublished paper
