= New Studies in Biblical Theology =

New Studies in Biblical Theology is a series of volumes of biblical theology. It is published by Apollos Publishing in the United Kingdom and formerly by InterVarsity Press in the United States. Beginning 2025, however, the American publisher will be B&H Academic. The series editor is D. A. Carson.

The series began in 1995, and so far 62 volumes have been published.

== Titles ==
1. David G. Peterson, Possessed by God: A New Testament Theology of Sanctification and Holiness (1995)
2. Raymond C. Ortlund, God’s Unfaithful Wife: A Biblical Theology of Spiritual Adultery (1996)
3. Paul W. Barnett, Jesus and the Logic of History (1997)
4. Daniel J. Estes, Hear, My Son: Teaching and Learning in Proverbs 1-9 (1997)
5. Henri Blocher, Original Sin: Illuminating the Riddle (1997)
6. J. Gary Millar, Now Choose Life: Theology and Ethics in Deuteronomy (1998)
7. Craig L. Blomberg, Neither Poverty nor Riches: A Biblical Theology of Possessions (1999)
8. Murray J. Harris, Slave of Christ: A New Testament Metaphor for Total Devotion to Christ (1999)
9. Mark A. Seifrid, Christ, Our Righteousness: Paul’s Theology of Justification (2000)
10. Barry G. Webb, Five Festal Garments: Christian Reflections on the Song of Songs, Ruth, Lamentations, Ecclesiastes and Esther (2000)
11. Andreas J. Köstenberger and Peter T. O'Brien, Salvation to the Ends of the Earth: A Biblical Theology of Mission (2001)
12. Robert Fyall, Now My Eyes Have Seen You: Images of Creation and Evil in the Book of Job (2002)
13. David W. Pao, Thanksgiving: An Investigation of a Pauline Theme (2002)
14. J. Daniel Hays, From Every People and Nation: A Biblical Theology of Race (2003)
15. Stephen G. Dempster, Dominion and Dynasty: A Biblical Theology of the Hebrew Bible (2003)
16. Peter Adam, Hearing God’s Words: Exploring Biblical Spirituality (2004)
17. G. K. Beale, The Temple and the Church’s Mission: A Biblical Theology of the Dwelling Place of God (2004)
18. Peter G. Bolt, The Cross from a Distance: Atonement in Mark’s Gospel (2004)
19. Craig L. Blomberg, Contagious Holiness: Jesus’ Meals with Sinners (2005)
20. Timothy Laniak, Shepherds After My Own Heart: Pastoral Traditions and Leadership in the Bible (2006)
21. Mark D. Thompson, A Clear and Present Word: The Clarity of Scripture (2006)
22. Trevor J. Burke, Adopted into God’s Family: Exploring a Pauline Metaphor(2006)
23. Paul R. Williamson, Sealed with an Oath: Covenant in God’s Unfolding Plan (2007).
24. Andreas J. Köstenberger and Scott R. Swain, Father, Son and Spirit: The Trinity and John’s Gospel (2008)
25. Graham A. Cole, God the Peacemaker: How Atonement Brings Shalom (2009)
26. Daniel C. Timmer, A Gracious and Compassionate God: Mission, Salvation and Spirituality in the Book of Jonah (2011)
27. Alan J. Thompson, The Acts of the Risen Lord Jesus: Luke’s Account of God’s Unfolding Plan (2011)
28. W. Ross Blackburn, The God Who Makes Himself Known: The Missionary Heart of the Book of Exodus (2012)
29. Andrew G. Shead, A Mouth Full of Fire: The Word of God in the Words of Jeremiah (2012)
30. Graham A. Cole, The God Who Became Human: A Biblical Theology of Incarnation (2012)
31. Brian S. Rosner, Paul and the Law: Keeping the Commandments of God (2013)
32. James M. Hamilton, Jr., With the Clouds of Heaven: The Book of Daniel in Biblical Theology (2014)
33. Bradley G. Green, Covenant and Commandment: Works, Obedience and Faithfulness in the Christian Life (2014)
34. Oren R. Martin, Bound for the Promised Land: The Land Promise in God's Redemptive Plan (2015)
35. Mark J. Boda, 'Return to Me': A Biblical Theology of Repentance (2015)
36. Richard Lints, Identity and Idolatry: The Image of God and Its Inversion (2015)
37. L. Michael Morales, Who Shall Ascend the Mountain of the Lord? A Biblical Theology of the Book of Leviticus (2015)
38. J. Gary Millar, Calling on the Name of the Lord: A Biblical Theology of Prayer (2016)
39. Peter T. O'Brien, God Has Spoken in His Son: A Biblical Theology of Hebrews (2016)
40. Andrew T. Abernethy, The Book of Isaiah and God's Kingdom: A Thematic-Theological Approach (2016)
41. Peter H. W. Lau and Gregory Goswell, Unceasing Kindness: A Biblical Theology Of Ruth (2016)
42. Jonathan I. Griffiths, Preaching in the New Testament: An Exegetical And Biblical-Theological Study (2017)
43. Andrew S. Malone, God's Mediators: A Biblical Theology of Priesthood (2017)
44. Paul R. Williamson, Death and the Afterlife: Biblical Perspectives on Ultimate Questions (2018)
45. Karl Deenick, Righteous by Promise: A Biblical Theology of Circumcision (2018)
46. Richard Belcher, Finding Favour in the Sight of God: A Theology of Wisdom Literature (2018)
47. Peter Orr, Exalted Above The Heavens: The Risen And Ascended Christ (2018)
48. Brian J. Tabb, All Things New: Revelation As Canonical Capstone (2019)
49. Michael J. Ovey, The Feasts of Repentance: From Luke-Acts To Systematic and Pastoral Theology (2019)
50. David G. Firth, Including the Stranger: Foreigners In The Former Prophets (2019)
51. Matthew Barrett, Canon, Covenant and Christology: Rethinking Jesus And The Scriptures Of Israel (2020)
52. Chris Bruno, Jared Compton and Kevin McFadden, Biblical Theology According to the Apostles: How The Earliest Christians Told The Story Of Israel (2020)
53. Andreas J. Köstenberger with T. Desmond Alexander, Salvation to the Ends of the Earth: A Biblical Theology of Mission (second edition; 2020)
54. Matthew S. Harmon, The Servant of the Lord and His Servant People: Tracing A Biblical Theme Through The Canon (2020)
55. J. Gary Millar, Changed Into His Likeness: A Biblical Theology Of Personal Transformation (2021)
56. Eric Ortlund, Piercing Leviathan: God's Defeat Of Evil In The Book Of Job (2021)
57. Dean R. Ulrich, Now and Not Yet: Theology and Mission in Ezra-Nehemiah (2021)
58. Christopher W. Morgan and Robert A. Peterson, The Glory of God and Paul: Text, Themes and Theology (2022)
59. Samuel Emadi, From Prisoner to Prince: The Joseph Story In Biblical Theology (2022)
60. Matthew Emadi, The Royal Priest: Psalm 110 In Biblical Theology (2022)
61. Clive Bowsher, Life in the Son: Exploring Participation and Union with Christ in John’s Gospel and Letters (2023)
62. James Hely Hutchinson, Answering the Psalmist's Perplexity: New-Covenant Newness In The Book Of Psalms (2023)
