= Themelios =

Christian theologian journal

- Discipline: Religious studies
- Language: English
- Edited by: Brian J. Tabb

Publication details
- History: 1962-present
- Publisher: The Gospel Coalition (United States)
- Frequency: Triannually

Standard abbreviations
- ISO 4: Themelios

Links
- Journal homepage

Themelios (Greek: Θεμέλιος, i.e., foundation or keystone) is a peer-reviewed international evangelical theological journal that expounds on the historic Christian faith. Its primary audience is theological students, pastors and scholars. It was formerly a print journal operated by RTSF/UCCF in the UK, and it became a digital journal operated by The Gospel Coalition in 2008. Also previously it was known as the Theological Students Fellowship (TSF) Bulletin from 1951 to 1957. While published in the United States, the writers are from many countries around the globe. Themelios works with Logos Bible Software in its publishing.

== Editors and writers ==
Some editors and writers:

- Carl Trueman
- D. A. Carson
- Gavin Ortlund
- R. T. France
- Donald Guthrie
- John Goldingay
- Martyn C. Cowan
- Edward Fudge
- Guillaume Chartier
- Gregory Beale
- Murray J. Harris
- Andrew Loke
- Andrew G. Shead
- Mark A. Seifrid
- Manuel Ortiz
- Stephen Charnock
- Stefan Paas
- Graeme Goldsworthy
- Rainer Riesner
- Alan Millard
- B. B. Warfield
- Donald Fairbairn
- Peter H. Davids
- Craig Blomberg
- Karl Barth
- John M. G. Barclay
- Peter Enns
- Eckhard J. Schnabel
- James Orr
- Vigen Guroian
- John Kilner
- Thomas Newton
- Richard Coppin
