= Tell Fekherya bilingual inscription =

Hadad-yith'i Bilingual Inscription
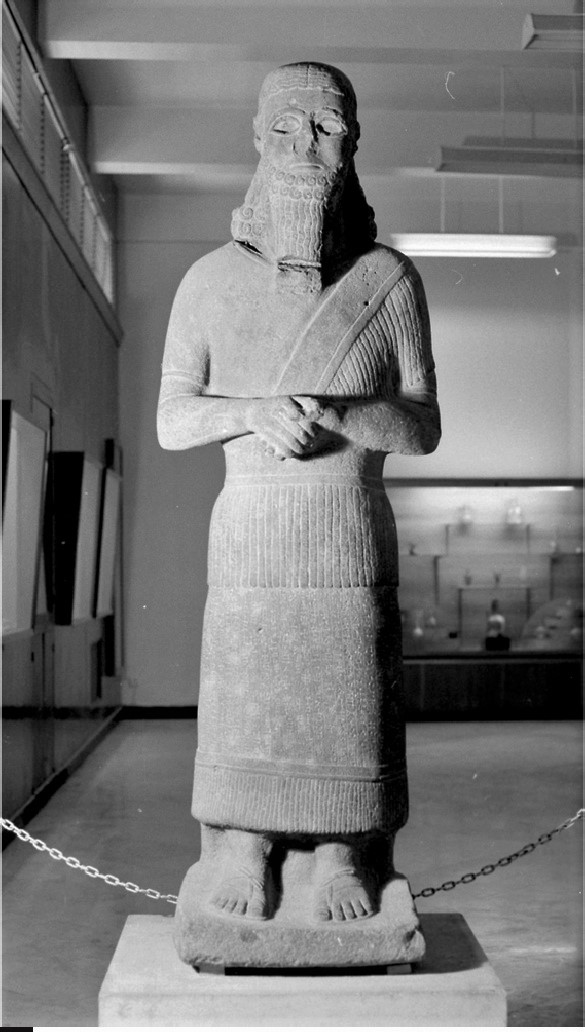
- Material: Basalt
- Writing: Akkadian and Aramaic
- Created: 9th century BC
- Discovered: 1979
- Present location: National Museum of Damascus

The Hadad-yith'i bilingual inscription, also known as the Tell el Fakhariya Bilingual Inscription, is a bilingual inscription found on a Neo-Assyrian statue of Adad-it'i/Hadd-yith'i, the king of Guzana and Sikan, which was discovered at Tell Fekheriye in Syria in the late 1970s. The inscriptions are in the Assyrian dialect of Akkadian and Aramaic, the earliest Aramaic inscription. The statue, a standing figure wearing a tunic, is made of basalt and is 2 meters tall including the base. The two inscriptions are on the skirt of the tunic, with the Akkadian inscription (38 lines) on the front and the Aramaic inscription (23 lines) on the back. The text is most likely based on an Aramaic prototype. It is the earliest known Aramaic inscription, and is known as KAI 309.

The statue was inscribed as a votive object to Hadad, whose name the donor bore. It is generally dated to around 850 BC, though an 11th-century BC date has also been proposed.

== Inscription ==
The inscription was carved in the two languages: Akkadian and Aramaic. The two versions are closely related in the beginning, however the second half has more differences.

=== Translation ===
The following translation is based on the Akkadian version:

To Adad, the canal inspector of heaven and earth, who causes it to rain abundance, who gives well-watered pastures to the people of all cities, and who provides portions of food offering to the gods, his brothers, inspector of the rivers who makes the whole world flourish, the merciful god to whom it is sweet to pray, he who resides in the city Guzana.

Hadad-yith'i, the governor of the land Guzana, the son of Sassu-nuri, governor of the land Guzana, has dedicated and given (this statue) to the great lord, his lord, for his good health and long days, for making his years numbers, for the well-being of his house, his descendants and his people, to remove his body's illnesses, and that my prayers will be heard and that my words will be favorably received.

May whoever finds it in disrepair in the future, renew it and put my name on it. Whoever removes my name and puts his own on it, may Adad, the hero, be his judge.

Statue of Hadad-yith'i, the governor of Guzana, Sikani, and Zarani. For the continuation of his throne and the lengthening of his region, so that his words will be agreeable to gods and men, he has made this statue better than before. In front of Adad who resides in the city Sikani, lord of the Habur River, he has erected his statue.

Whoever removes my name from the objects in the temple of Adad, my lord, may my lord Adad not accept his food and drink offerings, may my lady Shala not accept his food and drink offerings. May he sow but not reap. May he sow a thousand (measures), but reap only one. May one hundred ewes not satisfy one spring lamb; may one hundred cows not satisfy one calf, may one hundred women not satisfy one child, may one hundred bakers not fill up one oven! May the gleaners glean from rubbish pits. May illness, plague and insomnia not disappear from his land!

=== Notable elements ===
In the Assyrian passage of the inscription, Adad It'i gives his title as "governor" (saknu or saknu mati) of Guzana, whereas speaking to his own people in his own Aramaic tongue, he records his name as Hadad Yith'i, and his title is given as "king" (mlk).

Declaring that the god Hadad is the king Hadad Yith'i's lord, by whose blessing he rules, the inscription notably contains the Aramaic words for "image" (selem) and "likeness" (demut), thus furnishing an ancient and extra-biblical attestation for the terminology used in Genesis 1:26 on the Image of God.

Parallels have been noted between the curse invoked against potential vandals in this inscription and those made in others in Old Testament texts or extrabiblical ones like those in the Sefire inscriptions. For example, Kevin J. Cathcart notes the use of the formulation "Hadad the warrior" (hd gbr) is echoed in the Book of Isaiah's "God the Warrior" (el gbr).

== See also ==
- Canaanite and Aramaic inscriptions
- Hadad-yith'i

== Bibliography ==
- Abou-Assaf, Ali, P. Bordreuil, and A. Millard, 1982: La Statue de Tell Fekherye et son inscription bilingue assyro-araméenne (Paris: Editions Recherche sur les civilisations), 13-37, ISBN 2-86538-036-X
- Abou-Assaf, Ali, 1981, "Die Statue des HDYS'Y, König von Guzana", Mitteilungen der Deutschen Orient-Gesellschaft, volume 113, 3ff
- Cathcart, Kevin J. (1996). "The Curses in Old Aramaic Inscriptions". In Cathcart; Michael Maher (eds.). Targumic and Cognate Studies: Essays in Honour of Martin McNamara.
- Greenfield, J. C.; Aaron Shaffer (1983). "Notes on the Akkadian-Aramaic Bilingual Statue from Tell Fekherya". Iraq. 45 (1): 109–116. doi:10.2307/4200185. ISBN 9004121706. JSTOR 4200185. S2CID 162893507.
- Gropp, Douglas M.; Theodore J. Lewis (1985). "Notes on Some Problems in the Aramaic Text of the Hadd-Yith'i". Bulletin of the American Schools of Oriental Research. 259: 45–61. doi:10.2307/1356797. JSTOR 1356797. S2CID 163268357.
- Lipinski, E. (1994). "The Bilingual Inscription from Tell Fekheriye". Studies in Aramaic Inscriptions and Onomastics II. Leuven: Peeters. ISBN 9789068316100.
- Middleton, J. Richard (2005). The Liberating Image: The Image Deio in Genesis I. Brazos Press. ISBN 9781441242785.
- Millard, A.; P. Bordreuil [in French] (1982). "A Statue from Syria with Assyrian and Aramaic Inscriptions". The Biblical Archaeologist. 45 (3): 135–141. doi:10.2307/3209808. JSTOR 3209808. S2CID 165620288.
- Muraoka, T. (1983–1984). "The Tell-Fekherye bilingual inscription and early Aramaic". Abr-Nahrain. 22: 79–117.
- Zukerman, Alexander (September–December 2011). "Titles of 7th Century BCE Philistine Rulers and their Historical-Cultural Background". Bibliotheca Orientalis. 68 (5–6).
