= Mark A. Seifrid =

American biblical scholar

- Occupations: Biblical academic and commentator

Academic background
- Education: Trinity Evangelical Divinity School
- Alma mater: Princeton Theological Seminary (Ph.D.)
- Thesis: (1990)

Academic work
- Discipline: Biblical studies
- Sub-discipline: New Testament & Pauline studies
- Institutions: Southern Baptist Theological Seminary, Concordia Seminary
- Notable works: The Second Letter to the Corinthians (PNTC)

Mark A. Seifrid is a scholar of the New Testament letters of Paul, and a professor emeritus of Exegetical Theology at Concordia Seminary, St. Louis.

He was previously the Ernest and Mildred Hogan professor of New Testament interpretation at Southern Baptist Theological Seminary in Louisville, Kentucky. He is a graduate of Trinity Evangelical Divinity School, Deerfield, Illinois, and received his Ph.D. from Princeton Theological Seminary in 1990.

Seifrid has published major works on justification in the New Testament and a commentary on 2 Corinthians, and is currently writing a commentary on Galatians.

In 2021, a Festschrift was published in his honor. Always Reforming: Reflections on Martin Luther and Biblical Studies included contributions from Oswald Bayer, Robert Kolb, Benjamin L. Merkle, and Thomas R. Schreiner.

== Selected works ==
=== Books ===
- Seifrid, Mark A. (1992). Justification by Faith: The Origin and Development of a Central Pauline Theme. Novum Testamentum Supplements. Leiden: Brill. ISBN 978-9004095212.
- ——— (2000). Christ, Our Righteousness: Paul's Theology of Justification. New Studies in Biblical Theology. Vol. 9. Downers Grove, IL: Apollos. ISBN 978-0-8308-2609-4.
- ———; Carson, D. A.; O'Brien, Peter T., eds. (2001). Justification And Variegated Nomism: Volume 1: The Complexities of Second Temple Judaism. Grand Rapids, MI: Baker Academic. ISBN 978-0-8010-2272-2.
- ———; Tan, Randall K. J. (2002). The Pauline Writings: An Annotated Bibliography. IBR Bibliographies. Vol. 9. Grand Rapids, MI: Baker Academic. ISBN 978-0-8010-2482-5.
- ———; Carson, D. A.; O'Brien, Peter T., eds. (2004). Justification And Variegated Nomism: Volume 2: The Paradoxes of Paul. Grand Rapids, MI: Baker Academic. ISBN 978-0-8010-2741-3.
- ——— (2014). The Second Letter to the Corinthians. Pillar New Testament Commentary. Grand Rapids, MI: Eerdmans. ISBN 978-0-8028-3739-4.

=== Articles and chapters ===
- ——— (1994). "Blind Alleys in the Controversy over the Paul of History". Tyndale Bulletin. 45 (1): 73–96.
- ——— (1996). "The Nature of Christian Community and the Theological Seminary". In Gushee, David P.; Jackson, Walter C. (eds.). Preparing for Christian Ministry: an evangelical approach. Wheaton, IL: Victor Books. ISBN 978-1-5647-6606-9.
- ——— (1999). Is justification forensic?. 51st National Conference of the Evangelical Theological Society, Danvers, MA, November 17–19, 1999. Vol. ETS-5134. Evangelical Theological Society papers. OCLC 45092351.
- ——— (2000). "The 'New Perspective on Paul' and its Problems". Themelios. 25 (3): 4–18.
- ——— (2000). "In What Sense is 'Justification' a Declaration?". Churchman. 114 (2): 123–36.
- ——— (2003). "Paul, Luther, and Justification in Gal 2:15-21". Westminster Theological Journal. 65: 215–30.
- ——— (2004). "Justification in Protestant Traditions. Luther, Melanchthon and Paul on the Question of Imputation: recommendations on a current debate". In Husbands, Mark; Treier, Daniel J. (eds.). Justification : what's at stake in the current debates. Downers Grove, IL: InterVarsity Press. ISBN 978-0-8308-2781-7.
- ——— (2015). "The Text of Romans and the Theology of Melanchthon". In Allen, Michael; Linebaugh, Jonathan A. (eds.). Reformation Readings of Paul: Explorations in History and Exegesis. Downers Grove, IL: IVP Academic. ISBN 978-0-8308-4091-5.
