= Hadad-yith'i =

Assyrian client king

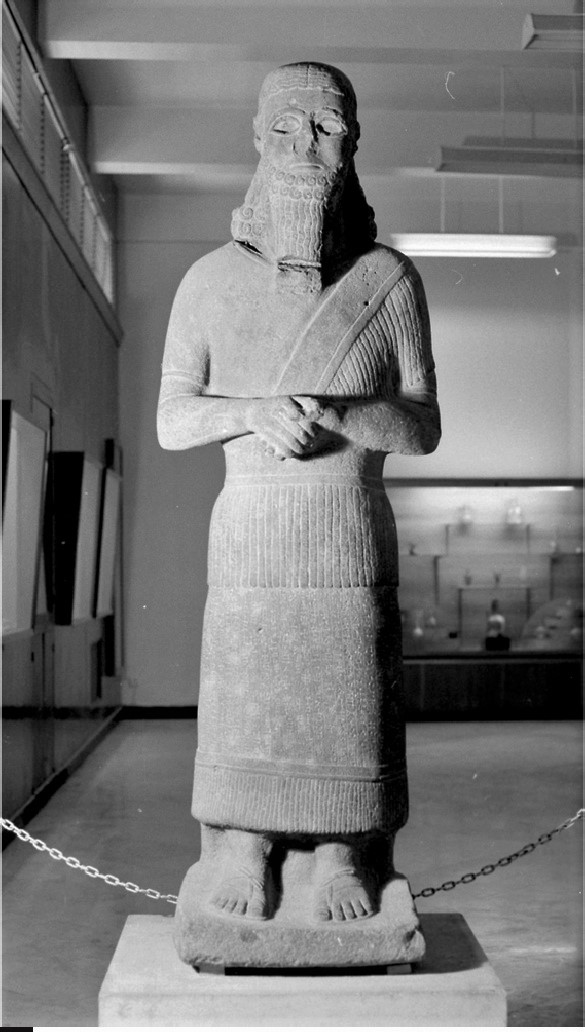
The Tell Fekheriyeh statue. Presently in the National Museum of Damascus

Hadad-yith'i (Old Aramaic: 𐡄𐡃𐡉𐡎𐡏𐡉, romanized: Hadd-yiṯʿī, Akkadian: 𒁹𒌋𒀉𒀪, romanized: Adad-itʾī) was governor of Guzana and Sikani in northern Syria (c. 850 BCE). A client king or vassal of the Neo-Assyrian Empire, he was the son of Sassu-nuri, who also served as governor before him. Knowledge of Hadad-yith'i's rule comes largely from the statue and its inscription found at the Tell Fekheriye. Known as the Hadad-yith'i bilingual inscription, as it is written in both Old Aramaic and Akkadian, its discovery, decipherment and study contributes significantly to cultural and linguistic understandings of the region.

== Statue & inscription ==
The life-size basalt statue of a male standing figure carved in Assyrian style was uncovered by a Syrian farmer in February 1979 at the edge of Tell Fekheriye on a branch of the Khabur opposite Tell Halaf, identified with ancient Guzana. Most stone statues discovered and documented as belonging to the Neo-Assyrian period depict either the kings of Assyria or its gods. The statue of Hadad-yith'i, lacking in royal marks or insignia, is one of only three known stone statues from this period bearing images of figures of lesser rank or reverence.

Based on the stylistic features of the statue, it has been tentatively dated to the mid-ninth century BCE, though it could be as old as 11th century when considering the archaic traits of several graphemes used in the Old Aramaic script.

The name of the inscription's commissioner is recorded as Adad Itʾi/Hadad Yithʿī, and dedicates the statue to the temple in Sikanu of the storm god Hadad, a deity worshipped throughout Syria and Mesopotamia at the time.

The statue bears the most extensive bilingual inscription in Akkadian and Aramaic, and is the oldest Aramaic inscription of such length. The inscription also contains a curse against those who would efface Hadad Yithʿī's name from the Hadad temple, invoking Hadad not to accept the offerings of those who did so.

== Name, meaning, root ==
Hadad Yithʿī is an Aramaic name, and the Akkadian version of the name in the bilingual inscription is transcribed as Adad Itʾi. That the Aramaic has an "s" in place of the "t" in Itʾi, thus ysʿy, is an indication of how the name was vocalized in Aramaic.

The second part of the king's name, Yithʿī, is a derivation of an ancient Semitic root meaning "to save", so that the translation of the full name into English is "Hadad is my salvation".

This name is significant in Semitic studies because it establishes beyond a doubt the existence of Aramaic personal names based on and derived from the root yṯʿ "to help, save". Prior to this decipherment, and that of another Aramaic inscription discovered in Qumran, scholars thought that the verbal root parallel to ישע, often identified as the root for the names Jesus and Joshua, existed only in Biblical Hebrew, and did not exist in Aramaic.

More discoveries and decipherments of ancient Semitic inscriptions have since uncovered dozens of other examples based on this triliteral root yṯʿ, the earliest of these being from 2048 BCE in the Amorite personal name lašuil.

== See also ==
- Tell el Fakhariya
- Tell el Fakhariya bilingual inscription

== Bibliography ==
- Aitken, James K.; Graham Davies (2016). יָשַׁ ע (PDF). Semantics of Ancient Hebrew Database.
- Bandstra, Barry L. (2008). Reading the Old Testament: Introduction to the Hebrew Bible. Cengage Learning. ISBN 978-1111804244.
- Cathcart, Kevin J. (1996). Kevin J. Cathcart; Michael Maher; Martin McNamara (eds.). Targumic and Cognate Studies: Essays in Honour of Martin McNamara.
- Fales, MF (2011). Old Aramaic. pp. 555–573.
- Fitzmyer, J. (2000). The Dead Sea Scrolls and Christian Origins. Wm. B. Eerdmann's Publishing. ISBN 9780802846501.
- Grayson, Albert K. (1991). Assyrian civilization. J.Boardman et al., 194–228.
- Levine, B.A. (1996). Joseph E. Coleson; Victor Harold Matthews; Dwight W. Young (eds.). Go to the Land I Will Show You: Studies in Honor of Dwight W. Young. Eisenbrauns.
- Lipinski, E. (1975). Studies in Aramaic Inscriptions and Onomastica II. Peeters Publishers. ISBN 9789068316100.
- Middleton, J. Richard (2005). The Liberating Image: The Image Deio in Genesis I. Brazos Press. ISBN 9781441242785.
- Millard, A., (2014) Context of Scripture Online. Editor in Chief: W. Hallo. BrillOnline, Retrieved 6 December 2014.
- Millard, A.R.; P. Bordreuil (Summer 1982). "A Statue from Syria with Assyrian and Aramaic Inscriptions". Biblical Archaeologist. 45 (3): 135–141. doi:10.2307/3209808. JSTOR 3209808.
- Roobaert, Arlette (1996) "A Neo-Assyrian Statue From Til Barsib." British Institute for the Study of Iraq 58: 83. Retrieved 27 November 2014.
- Van de Mieroop, M. (2015). A History of the Ancient Near East: 3000 – 332 BC. John Wiley & Sons. ISBN 9781118718162.
- Zukerman, Alexander (September–December 2011). "Titles of 7th Century BCE Philistine Rulers and their Historical-Cultural Background". Bibliotheca Orientalis. 68 (5–6).
