= Tyndale House (Cambridge) =

Biblical studies library in Cambridge

Coordinates: 52.1994°N 0.1036°E

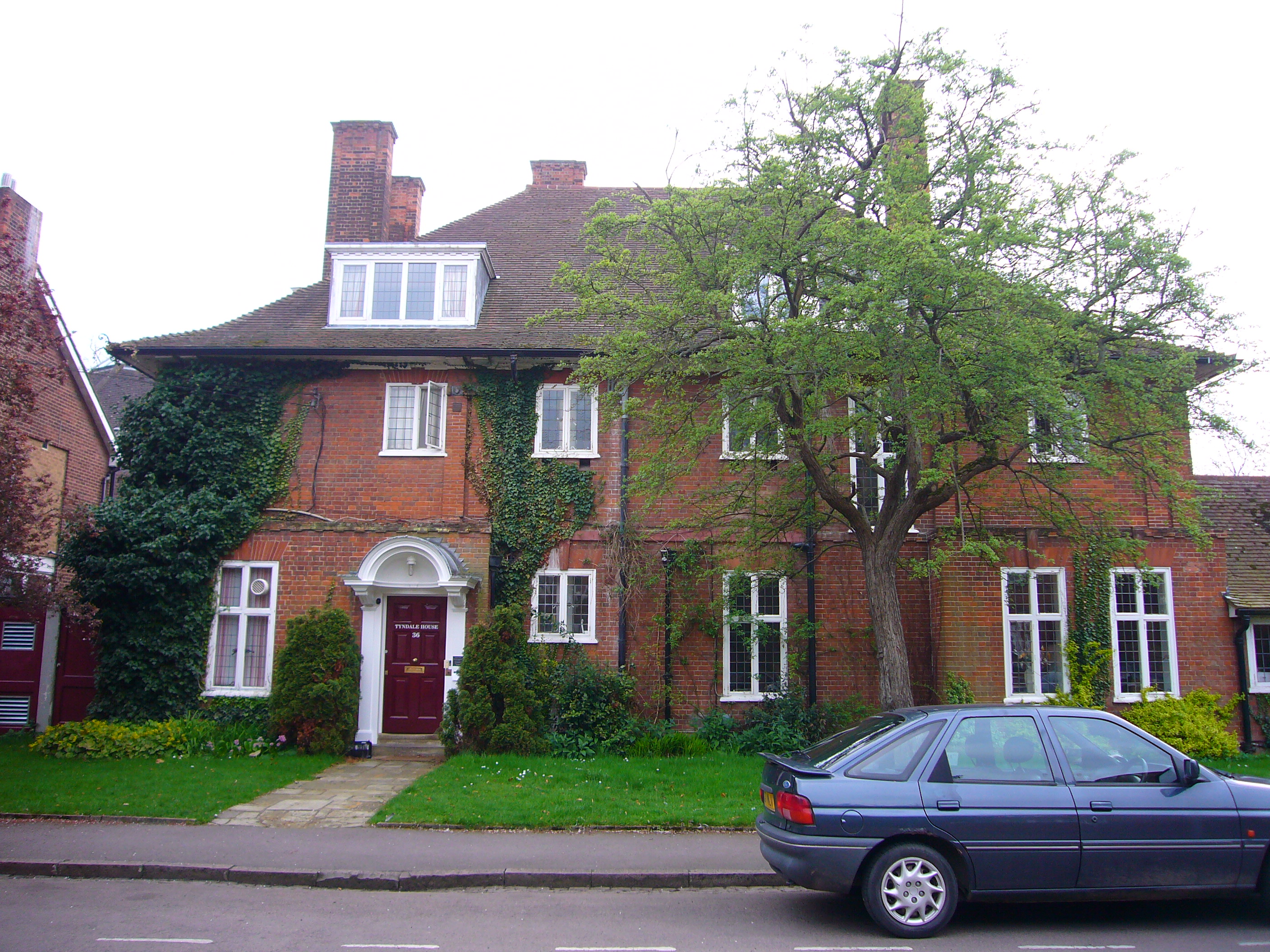
Tyndale House

Tyndale House is an independent biblical studies library in Cambridge, England, with a Christian foundation. Founded in 1945, it aims to provide specialist resources in support of research into the Old and New Testaments, along with relevant historical backgrounds.

== Description ==
Tyndale House is a residential centre for biblical scholarship. Many of its readers are doctoral students from the University of Cambridge, studying in the Faculty of Divinity or the Faculty of Asian and Middle Eastern Studies. Tyndale House also houses students and scholars from around the world working at postgraduate level. Scholars who have spent time at Tyndale House include Craig Blomberg, D. A. Carson, Wayne Grudem, Leon Morris, J. I. Packer, John Piper, John Stott, and Donald Wiseman.

The Tyndale Fellowship, an academic society associated with Tyndale House, is an international fellowship of Christians engaged in biblical and theological research.

The Tyndale Bulletin is an annual journal of Tyndale House. TH ink magazine was first published in 2018 and 'offers thought-provoking articles about the language, history, and cultural context of the Bible'. At the moment TH ink is published twice yearly.

In 2013, Tyndale House launched the online Bible software STEP Bible.

In 2017, Tyndale House published an edition of the Greek New Testament with Cambridge University Press and Crossway Books. Researchers have called the Tyndale House Greek New Testament "the most faithful rendering of the original text ever produced" and suggested it "could pave the way for more accurate English translations".

In the same year, Tyndale House Research Associate, Dr Kim Phillips, published an article in the Tyndale Bulletin identifying a Bible manuscript in St Petersburg, Russia, as by the scribe who also wrote the Leningrad Codex, the earliest complete copy of the entire Old Testament in Hebrew.

In 2022 researchers from Tyndale House were involved in the discovery of part of the lost star catalogue of Hipparchus.

== Kirby Laing Centre for Public Theology in Cambridge ==
The Kirby Laing Centre for Public Theology in Cambridge (KLC), previously called the Kirby Laing Institute for Christian Ethics (KLICE), is an independent evangelical organisation that promotes the study and understanding of Christian ethics, both in research and in public discourse. It was founded in 2006 at Tyndale House, supported by the Kirby Laing Foundation, but was launched as an independent organisation in 2020. The current director is Rev. Dr. Craig G. Bartholomew, who was the H Evan Runner Professor of Philosophy and Professor of Religion and Theology at Redeemer University College in Ancaster, Ontario.

KLC's activities include research, publication, collaborative projects, and running conferences and seminars. KLC states that its vision is "to contribute a Christian perspective to public debates about ethics in the UK."

Three times a year KLC publishes articles on various ethical subjects under the name Ethics in Brief.

The first Director of KLICE was Jonathan Chaplin, who held his position from 2006 to 2017.
