= Peter O'Brien (theologian) =

Australian New Testament scholar (born 1935)

Peter Thomas O'Brien
- Born: 6 November 1935 (age 91)
- Occupations: New Testament scholar and Biblical commentator
- Children: 4

Academic background
- Education: Moore Theological College, University of Manchester
- Doctoral advisor: Professor F. F. Bruce

Academic work
- Era: Modern
- Discipline: New Testament studies
- Institutions: Union Biblical Seminary; Moore Theological College
- Notable works: Joint editor with D. A. Carson and Mark A. Seifrid, Justification and Variegated Nomism: A Fresh Appraisal of Paul and Second Temple Judaism. 2 vols. WUNT 2:140, 2:181; Tübingen/Grand Rapids: Mohr Siebeck/Baker, 2001–2004. Christianity Today 2002 Book Award Winner.

Peter Thomas O'Brien (born 6 November 1935) is an Australian clergyman, missionary and New Testament scholar. He has written commentaries on Ephesians, Philippians, Colossians, Philemon, and Hebrews as well as books and articles on aspects of the thought of the apostle Paul.

== Ministry ==
O'Brien was converted at the age of nineteen, and studied at Moore Theological College and the University of Manchester. He taught at Union Biblical Seminary in Yavatmal, India, before returning to Moore as a lecturer, later serving as Vice Principal. While teaching at Moore he was a Recognised Teacher in Divinity at the University of Sydney. He is a priest in the Anglican Diocese of Sydney.

In 2000, a Festschrift was published in his honour, called A Gospel for the Nations: Perspectives on Paul's Mission: Essays Presented to Peter Thomas O’Brien on his Sixty-Fifth Birthday. Contributors included Paul Barnett, Don Carson, William Dumbrell, Graeme Goldsworthy, Peter Jensen, Andreas Köstenberger, Richard Longenecker, I. Howard Marshall, Ralph P. Martin, Donald Robinson, Moisés Silva, David Wenham, and Bruce Winter. In 2002 he received an honorary doctorate from the Australian College of Theology. In 2014 he received an honorary doctorate from Westminster Theological Seminary in Philadelphia.

== Withdrawal of commentaries ==
In early July 2016, allegations of plagiarism were made against O'Brien in regards to his commentary The Letter to the Hebrews in the Pillar New Testament Commentary series. On 15 August 2016 Eerdmans announced that after internal and external review that "what [they] found on the pages of this commentary runs afoul of commonly accepted standards with regard to the utilization and documentation of secondary sources. [They] agreed that the book could not be retained in print." As a result, they were ceasing sales of the commentary, along with two other works from O'Brien. IVP issued a similar statement regarding two titles in their New Studies in Biblical Theology (NSBT) series. By 4 November 2016 a similar statement was issued by the publishers Zondervan regarding O'Brien's Colossians – Philemon volume in the Word Biblical Commentary series. Each statement contains expressions of regret and evidences considerable reluctance in taking these actions.

O'Brien stated, "In the New Testament commentaries that I have written, although I have never deliberately misused the work of others, nevertheless I now see that my work processes at times have been faulty and have generated clear-cut, but unintentional, plagiarism. For this I apologize without reservation."

== Works ==
=== Books ===
- O'Brien, Peter T. (1971). Introductory Thanksgivings in the Letters of Paul. Supplements to Novum Testamentum. Vol. 49. Leiden: E.J. Brill. ISBN 978-9-0040-5265-9. OCLC 3659484.
- ——— (1982). Colossians - Philemon. Word Biblical Commentary. Vol. 44. Waco, TX: Word Books. ISBN 978-0-8499-0243-7. OCLC 8884681.
- ——— (1991). The Epistle to the Philippians: a commentary on the Greek text. New International Greek Testament Commentary. Grand Rapids, MI: Eerdmans. ISBN 978-0-802-82392-2. OCLC 24218057.
- ——— (1995). Gospel and Mission in the Writings of Paul: an exegetical and theological analysis. Grand Rapids, MI: Baker Academic. ISBN 978-0-801-02052-0. OCLC 32393340.
- ——— (1999). The Letter to the Ephesians. Pillar New Testament Commentary. Grand Rapids, MI: Eerdmans. ISBN 978-0-802-83736-3. OCLC 41932429.
- ———; Köstenberger, Andreas J. (2001). Salvation to the Ends of the Earth: a biblical theology of mission. New Studies in Biblical Theology. Vol. 11. Leicester, England & Downers Grove, IL: Apollos & InterVarsity Press. ISBN 978-0-851-11519-1. OCLC 46343082.
- ———; Carson, D. A.; Seifrid, Mark A., eds. (2001). Justification and Variegated Nomism: Vol 1: The Complexities of Second Temple Judaism. Grand Rapids, MI: Baker Academic. ISBN 978-0-801-02272-2. OCLC 47838604.
- ———; Carson, D. A.; Seifrid, Mark A., eds. (2004). Justification and Variegated Nomism: Vol 2: The Paradoxes of Paul. Grand Rapids, MI: Baker Academic. ISBN 978-0-801-02741-3. OCLC 47838604.
- ——— (2010). The Letter to the Hebrews. Pillar New Testament Commentary. Grand Rapids, MI: Eerdmans. ISBN 978-0-802-83729-5. OCLC 460935726.
- ——— (2016). God Has Spoken in His Son: a biblical theology of Hebrews. New Studies in Biblical Theology. Vol. 39. Leicester, England & Downers Grove, IL: Apollos & InterVarsity Press. ISBN 978-0-8308-2640-7.

=== Chapters ===
- ——— (1996). "Contemporary challenges to the doctrine of justification by faith". In Gibson, R. J. (ed.). Justification and Christian Assurance. Explorations. Vol. 10. Adelaide: OpenBook. pp. 1–25.

=== Articles ===
- ——— (1987). "Romans 8:26, 27. A Revolutionary Approach to Prayer?". Reformed Theological Review. 46: 65–73.
- ——— (1991). "Divine Provision for our Needs. Assurances from Philippians 4". Reformed Theological Review. 50: 21–29.
- ——— (1994). "Divine Analysis and Comprehensive Solution: Some Priorities from Ephesians 2". Reformed Theological Review. 53: 130–142.
- ——— (1997). "The New Testament and Psalms: An Inclusive Version". Churchman. 111: 58–61.
- ——— (1999). "Mission, Witness and the Coming of the Spirit". Bulletin for Biblical Research. 9: 203–214. doi:10.2307/26422238. JSTOR 26422238.
