= Murray J. Harris =

New Zealand born theologian (born 1939)

- Born: 19 March 1939 (age 87); Auckland, New Zealand
- Occupation: Biblical academic
- Title: Professor Emeritus of Bible and Theology at Trinity Evangelical Divinity School (Illinois) Trinity Divinity School
- Spouse: Jennifer Harris
- Children: Oliver Harris

Academic background
- Education: University of Manchester (PhD)
- Thesis: The Interpretation of 2 Corinthians 5:1-10 and Its Place in Pauline Eschatology
- Influences: F. F. Bruce

Academic work
- Discipline: Biblical studies
- Sub-discipline: New Testament studies

Murray J. Harris (born 19 March 1939) is professor emeritus of New Testament exegesis and theology at Trinity Evangelical Divinity School in Deerfield, Illinois. He was for a time warden of Tyndale House at Cambridge University.

== Life ==
=== Education ===
He gained his PhD from the University of Manchester, studying under F. F. Bruce.

== Writtings ==
He has written the book Slave of Christ in the IVP series New Studies in Biblical Theology which has been well received. Aside from this Harris is probably best known for his commentaries on 2 Corinthians in both the Expositor's Bible Commenatary (both editions) and the New International Greek Testament Commentary series.

=== Books ===
- Harris, Murray J. (1992). Jesus as God: The New Testament Use of Theos in Reference to Jesus. Grand Rapids: Baker. ISBN 978-0-8010-2195-4.
- ——— (2001). Slave of Christ. New Studies in Biblical Theology. Vol. 8. Downers Grove, IL: IVP Academic.
- ——— (2005). Second Epistle to the Corinthians. New International Greek Testament Commentary. Grand Rapids: Eerdmans. ISBN 978-0-8536-4580-1.
- ——— (2008). Jesus as God: The New Testament Use of Theos in Reference to Jesus (Reprint ed.). Wipf & Stock. ISBN 978-1-6060-8108-2.
- ——— (2012). Prepositions and Theology in the Greek New Testament: An Essential Reference Resource for Exegesis. Grand Rapids: Zondervan. ISBN 978-0-3104-9392-1.
- ——— (2013). Colossians and Philemon. Exegetical Guide to the Greek New Testament. Vol. 12. Nashville, TN: Broadman & Holman. ISBN 978-0-8054-4849-8.
- ——— (2015). John. Exegetical Guide to the Greek New Testament. Nashville, TN: Broadman & Holman. ISBN 978-1-4336-7687-1.

=== Articles and chapters ===
- ——— (1971). "2 Corinthians 5:1-10: Watershed in Paul's Eschatology". Tyndale Bulletin. 22 (1): 32–57. doi:10.53751/001c.30660.
- ——— (1976). "Resurrection and Immortality: Eight Theses". Themelios. 1 (2): 50–55.
- ——— (1977). "2 Corinthians". In Gaebelein, Frank E. (ed.). Romans-Galatians. Expositor's Bible Commentary. Vol. 10. Grand Rapids: Zondervan.
- ——— (2005). "2 Corinthians". In Longman, Tremper; Garland, David E. (eds.). Romans–Galatians. Expositor's Bible Commentary (revised). Vol. 11. Grand Rapids: Zondervan. ISBN 978-0310234951.
