= Gregory Beale =

American theologian (born 1949)

Gregory Kimball Beale
- Born: Gregory Kimball Beale; 1949 (age 76–77); Dallas, Texas, US
- Occupations: Theologian, professor
- Years active: 1976-present
- Title: Professor of New Testament and Biblical Theology at Westminster Theological Seminary

Academic background
- Education: Southern Methodist University; Dallas Theological Seminary; University of Cambridge
- Thesis: The Use of Daniel in Jewish Apocalyptic Literature and in the Revelation of St. John (1980)

Academic work
- Era: Late 20th and early 21st centuries
- Institutions: Grove City College; Gordon-Conwell Theological Seminary; Wheaton College; Westminster Theological Seminary; Reformed Theological Seminary
- Main interests: Old Testament in the New, biblical hermeneutics
- Notable works: The Book of Revelation: A Commentary on the Greek Text, A New Testament Biblical Theology: The Unfolding of the Old Testament in the New

Gregory Kimball Beale (born February 10, 1949, in Dallas, Texas; also known as G. K. Beale) is a biblical scholar, currently a professor of New Testament and Biblical Theology at Reformed Theological Seminary in Dallas, Texas. He is an ordained minister in the Orthodox Presbyterian Church. He has made a number of contributions to conservative biblical hermeneutics, particularly in the area of the use of the Old Testament in the New Testament and is one of the most influential and prolific active New Testament scholars in the world. He served as the president of the Evangelical Theological Society in 2004. In 2013, he was elected by Westminster Theological Seminary to be the first occupant of the J. Gresham Machen Chair of New Testament. At his inauguration he delivered an address titled The Cognitive Peripheral Vision of Biblical Writers.

In 2013, a Festschrift was published in his honor, called From Creation to New Creation: Biblical Theology and Exegesis. It included contributions by Richard J. Bauckham, Daniel I. Block, C. Hassell Bullock, D. A. Carson, Douglas J. Moo, and David F. Wells.

== Education ==
Gregory Beale began his academic journey with a BA from Southern Methodist University in 1971. He then earned an MA from the same institution in 1976, followed by a ThM from Dallas Theological Seminary that same year. He culminated his education with a Ph.D. in New Testament Studies from the University of Cambridge in 1981.

== Positions held ==
- Grove City College (1980–1984)
- Gordon-Conwell Theological Seminary (1984–2000)
- Wheaton College (2000–2010)
- Westminster Theological Seminary (2010–2021)
- Reformed Theological Seminary (2021–present)

== Works ==
=== Thesis ===
- Beale, Gregory K. (1980). The Use of Daniel in Jewish Apocalyptic Literature and in the Revelation of St. John (Ph.D.). Cambridge: Cambridge University.

=== Books ===
- Beale, Gregory K. (1984). The Use of Daniel in Jewish Apocalyptic Literature and in the Revelation of St. John. Lanham, MD: University Press of America. ISBN 978-0-819-14290-0. OCLC 11091372. – published revision of Beale's 1980 Cambridge Ph.D. dissertation
- ——— (1994). The Right Doctrine from the Wrong Texts?: Essays on the Use of the Old Testament in the New. Grand Rapids, MI: Baker Books. ISBN 978-0-801-01088-0. OCLC 31207689.
- ——— (1998), "John's Use of the Old Testament in Revelation", Journal for the Study of the New Testament, Supplement, vol. 166, Sheffield, ENG: Sheffield Academic Press, ISBN 978-1-850-75894-5, OCLC 40981843
- ——— (1999). The Book of Revelation: A Commentary on the Greek Text. New International Greek Testament Commentary. Grand Rapids, MI: Eerdmans. ISBN 978-0-802-82174-4. OCLC 38096989.
- ——— (2003). 1–2 Thessalonians. IVP New Testament Commentary. Downers Grove, IL: Inter-Varsity Press. ISBN 978-0-830-81813-6. OCLC 52509447.
- ——— (2004). The Temple and the Church's Mission: A Biblical Theology of the Dwelling Place of God. New Studies in Biblical Theology. Vol. 17. Downers Grove, IL: Inter-Varsity Press. ISBN 978-0-830-82618-6. OCLC 54073461.
- ———; Carson, D. A., eds. (2007). Commentary on the New Testament Use of the Old Testament. Grand Rapids, MI: Baker Academic. ISBN 978-0-801-02693-5. OCLC 370811667.
- ——— (2008). The Erosion of Inerrancy in Evangelicalism: Responding to New Challenges to Biblical Authority. Wheaton, IL: Crossway Books. ISBN 978-1-433-50203-3. OCLC 227205757.
- ——— (2008). We Become What We Worship: A Biblical Theology of Idolatry. Downers Grove, IL: IVP Academic. ISBN 978-0-830-82877-7. OCLC 223907846.
- ——— (2011). A New Testament Biblical Theology: The Unfolding of the Old Testament in the New. Grand Rapids, MI: Baker Academic. ISBN 978-0-801-02697-3. OCLC 699760262.
- ——— (2012). Handbook on the New Testament Use of the Old Testament: Exegesis And Interpretation. Grand Rapids, MI: Baker Academic. ISBN 978-0-801-03896-9. OCLC 775419951.
- ——— (2013). The Morality of God in the Old Testament. Christian Answers to Hard Questions. Phillipsburg, NJ: P&R Publishing. ISBN 978-1-596-38852-9. OCLC 857893420.
- ——— (2014). God Dwells Among Us: expanding Eden to the ends of the earth. Downers Grove, IL: Inter-Varsity Press. ISBN 978-0-830-84414-2. OCLC 880200011.
- ———; Gladd, Benjamin L. (2014). Hidden But Now Revealed: a biblical theology of mystery. Downers Grove, IL: IVP Academic. ISBN 978-0-830-82718-3. OCLC 880199622.
- ———; Ross, William A.; Brendsel, Daniel J. (2014). An Interpretive Lexicon of New Testament Greek: analysis of prepositions, adverbs, particles, relative pronouns, and conjunctions. Grand Rapids, MI: Zondervan. ISBN 978-0-310-49411-9. OCLC 874734046.
- ——— (2015). Revelation: a shorter commentary. Grand Rapids, MI: Eerdmans. ISBN 978-0-802-86621-9. OCLC 885378238. - a précis of the 1998 work The Book of Revelation
- ——— (2019). Colossians and Philemon. Baker Exegetical Commentary on the New Testament. Grand Rapids, MI: Baker Academic. ISBN 9780801026676.

=== Chapters ===
- ——— (2016). "The End Starts at the Beginning (intro. chapter)". Making All Things New: inaugurated eschatology for the life of the church. Benjamin L. Gladd, Matthew S. Harmon. Grand Rapids, MI: Baker Academic. ISBN 9781493402427. OCLC 957128513.
- ——— (2016). "New Testament hermeneutics". In Lillback, Peter A. (ed.). Seeing Christ in all of Scripture: hermeneutics at Westminster Theological Seminary. Philadelphia, PA: Westminster Seminary Press. ISBN 9780998005102. OCLC 948612023.

=== Journal articles ===
- ——— (1980). "The Danielic Background for Revelation 13-18 and 17:9". Tyndale Bulletin. 31: 163–170.
- ——— (1983). "The Problem of the Man From the Sea in Iv Ezra 13 and Its Relation To the Messianic Concept in John's Apocalypse". Novum Testamentum. 25 (2): 182–188. doi:10.2307/1560492.
- ——— (1984). "An Exegetical and Theological Consideration of the Hardening of Pharaoh's Heart in Exodus 4-14 and Romans 9" (PDF). Trinity Journal. 5: 129–154.
- ——— (Dec 1984). "The influence of Daniel upon the structure and theology of John's Apocalypse". Journal of the Evangelical Theological Society. 27 (4): 413–423.
- ——— (1985). "The Origin of the Title 'King of Kings and Lord of Lords' in Revelation 17.14". New Testament Studies. 31 (4): 618–620. doi:10.1017/S0028688500012157.
- ——— (1994). "Review Article: J. W. Mealy - After the Thousand Years". Evangelical Quarterly. 66 (3): 229–249. doi:10.1163/27725472-06603004. S2CID 252173456.
- ——— (2004). "Acts and the Isaianic New Exodus". Trinity Journal. 25 (1): 93–101.
- ——— (March 2005). "Eden, the Temple, and the Church's Mission in the New Creation". Journal of the Evangelical Theological Society. 48 (1): 5–31.
- ——— (2006). "Myth, History, and Inspiration: A Review Article of Inspiration and Incarnation by Peter Enns". Journal of the Evangelical Theological Society. 49: 287–312.
- ——— (2006). "Did Jesus and the Apostles Preach the Right Doctrine from the Wrong Texts? Revisiting the Debate Seventeen Years Later in the Light of Peter Enns's Book, Inspiration and Incarnation". Themelios. 32 (1): 18–43.
- ——— (2006). "A Surrejoinder to Peter Enns". Themelios. 32 (3).
- ——— (Spring 2007). "A Surrejoinder to Peter Enns's Response to G. K. Beale's JETS Review Article of His Book, Inspiration and Incarnation". Southern Baptist Journal of Theology. 11 (1): 16–37.
- ——— (2008). "Justification and Variegated Nomism. Vol. 2: The Paradoxes of Paul". Trinity Journal. 29 (1): 146.
- ——— (2009). "The Overstated "New" Perspective?". Bulletin for Biblical Research. 19 (1): 85–94. doi:10.2307/bullbiblrese.19.1.0085.

== Festschrift ==
- Gurtner, Daniel M.; Gladd, Benjamin L., eds. (2013). From Creation to New Creation: biblical theology and exegesis: essays in honor of G. K. Beale. Peabody, MA: Hendrickson Publishers. ISBN 978-1-598-56837-0. OCLC 871022733.
