= The Sin of Certainty =

2016 book

- Author: Peter Enns
- Language: English
- Genre: Christian literature
- Published: April 5, 2016
- Publisher: HarperCollins
- Pages: 240
- ISBN: 0-062-27209-8
- OCLC: 1023207078
- Website: peteenns.com/shop/the-sin-of-certainty/

The Sin of Certainty: Why God Desires Our Trust More Than Our "Correct" Beliefs is a book written by Peter Enns.

== Background ==
The intended audience of the book are Christians—particularly evangelicals—who feel tension between their commitment to the Bible and the difficulties of life. The book provides Christian readers with an opportunity to explore doubt by emphasizing that faith requires trusting God rather than having correct views about God. The book is conversational in tone and contains nine chapters divided up into three parts—history, exegesis, and theology.

The history section of the book discusses the impact of four events on Christian orthodoxy in the 19th century. The first was Charles Darwin's publication On the Origin of Species, which challenged the traditional Christian beliefs concerning the Genesis creation narrative. The second event called the divine inspiration of the Bible into question when archaeologists discovered that the Genesis flood narrative and Biblical law were likely borrowed from older cultures. The third event was when German academics discovered that the Pentateuch was written by multiple authors. The fourth event was the disagreement of Christian views on slavery in the United States. Enns argues that these events demonstrate that Christians cannot biblically prove the doctrines of Christian orthodoxy and should instead embrace the uncertainty of the Bible.

The exegetical section of the book include discussions of Old Testament stories that feature doubt as a major theme. The stories emphasize the hardships of biblical figures such as Solomon, the Psalmists, and Job. Enns addresses the fact that Christians often hold incorrect views about God. Enns suggests that holding onto one's own opinions about God is idolatrous. When discussing these incorrect views Enns suggests what he calls transrationalism as an alternative to fallibilism.

The theological section of the book draws on the New Testament and Enns' personal experiences. Enns' was forced to resign from seminary in 2008 for challenging conservative methods of biblical interpretation in his first book "Inspiration and Incarnation." This experience with the rigidity and certainty of Christian views impacted Enns and led to what he called a "forced spiritual relocation" that motivated him to explore and doubt aspects of Christianity that were previously off-limits to him. For instance, he describes his experiences with Christian mysticism and how he came to the religious community that he now participates in.
