= Tell Fekheriye =

- تل الفخيرية (Arabic)
- Sikkan
- Location within Syria
- 36°50′24″N 40°4′7″E
- Type: Settlement
- Location: Ras al-Ayn, Al-Hasakah Governorate, Syria
- Region: Upper Mesopotamia

Site notes
- Excavation dates: 1929, 1940, 1955, 2001, 2006-2010
- Archaeologists: Felix Langenegger, Hans Lehmann, Calvin W. McEwan, A. Pruß, Anton Moortgat
- Condition: In ruins

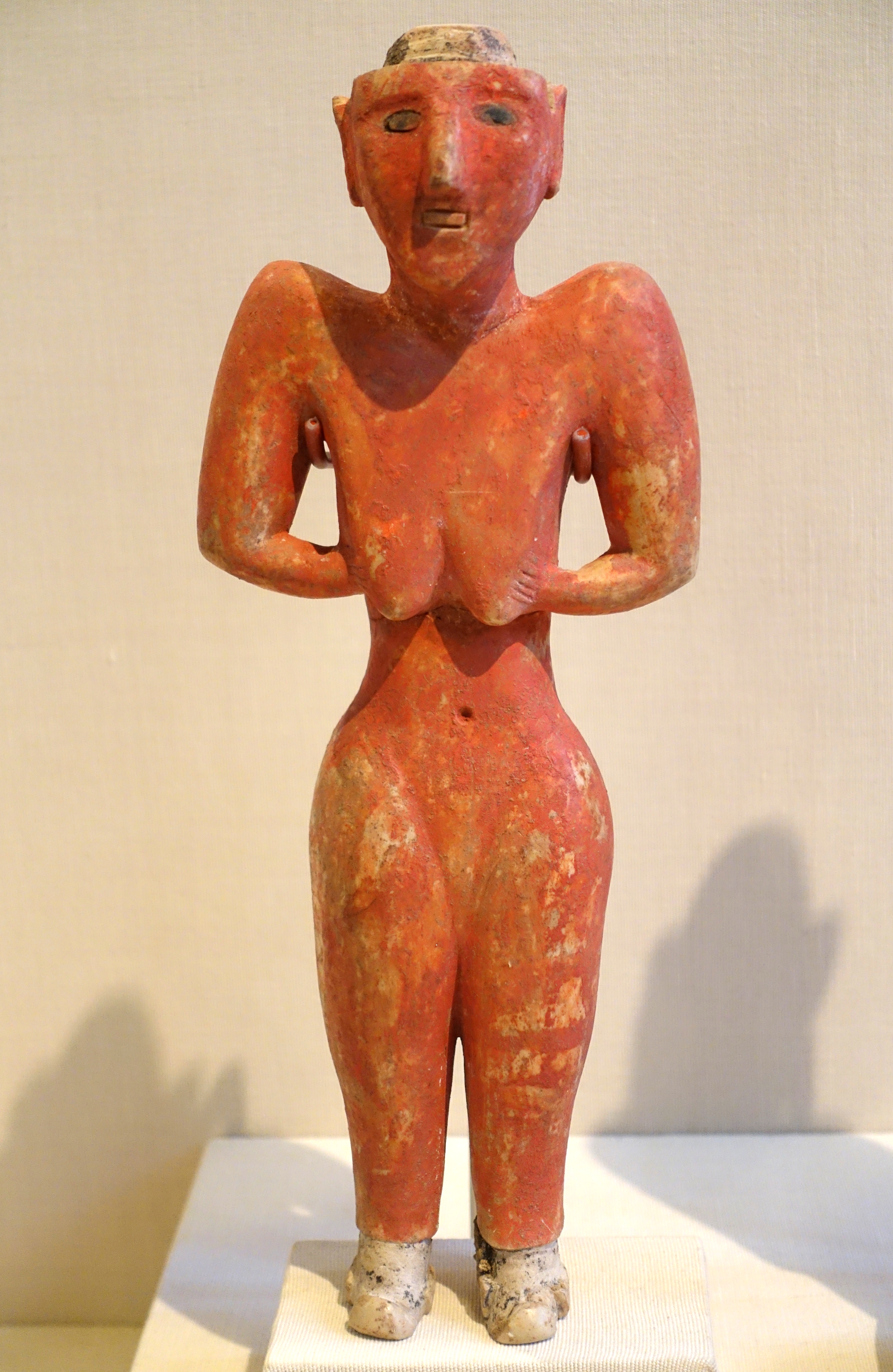
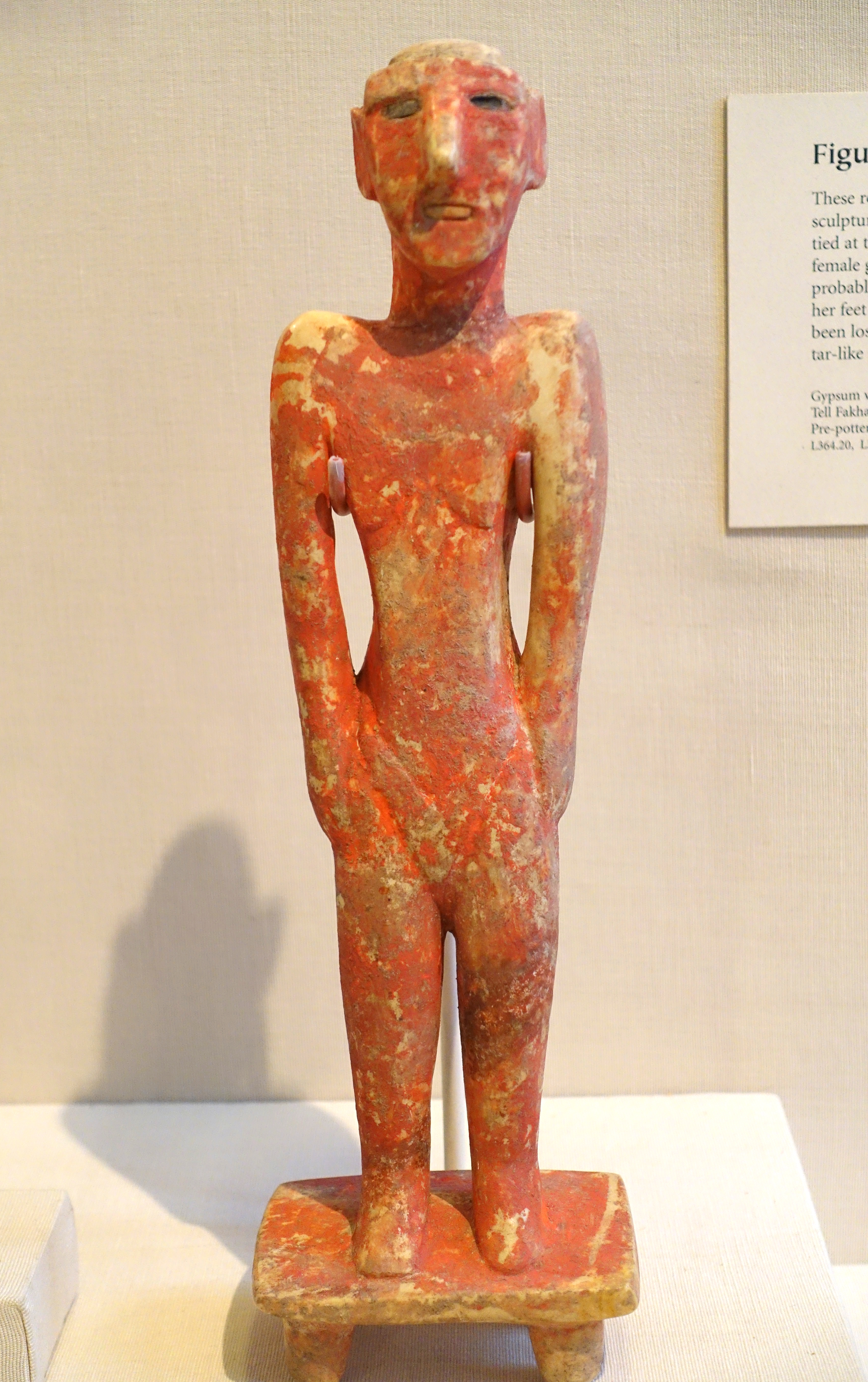
Two Neolithic figurines (9000–7000 BC), gypsum with bitumen and stone inlays, excavated in Tell Fekheriye.
Exhibited in the Oriental Institute Museum, Chicago, USA.

Tell Fekheriye (Arabic: تل الفخيرية) (often spelled as Tell el-Fakhariya or Tell Fecheriye, among other variants) is an ancient site in the Khabur river basin in al-Hasakah Governorate of northern Syria. It is securely identified as the site of Sikkan, attested since c. 2000 BC. While under an Assyrian governor c. 1000 BC it was called Sikani. Sikkan was part of the Syro-Hittite state of Bit Bahiani in the early 1st millennium BC. In the area, several mounds, called tells, can be found in close proximity: Tell Fekheriye, Ras al-Ayn, and 2.5 kilometers east of Tell Halaf, site of the Aramean and Neo-Assyrian city of Guzana. During the excavation, the Tell Fekheriye bilingual inscription (in the Assyrian dialect of Akkadian and Aramaic) was discovered at the site, which provides the source of information about Hadad-yith'i.

In the early 20th century Tell Fekheriye was suggested as the site of Washukanni, the capital of Mitanni, but the claim is unconfirmed. Many scholars opposed this theory including Michael Roaf, Peter Akkermans, David Oates, Joan Oates and Edward Lipiński. However this identification received a new support by Stefano de Martino due to recent archaeological excavations by a German team led by Mirko Novák and Dominik Bonatz.

== History ==
Map of the Khabur Basin during the Bronze Age showing the location of Tell Fekheriye (far to the left) in relation to other important sites

The site showed signs of occupation in the Neolithic period. The limited excavations so far conducted have shown substantial developments in the Middle Assyrian and Neo-Assyrian periods, with only scattered pottery sherds from the earlier Mitanni periods. The site was also occupied in the Roman-Byzantine period.

=== Proposed association with Washukanni ===
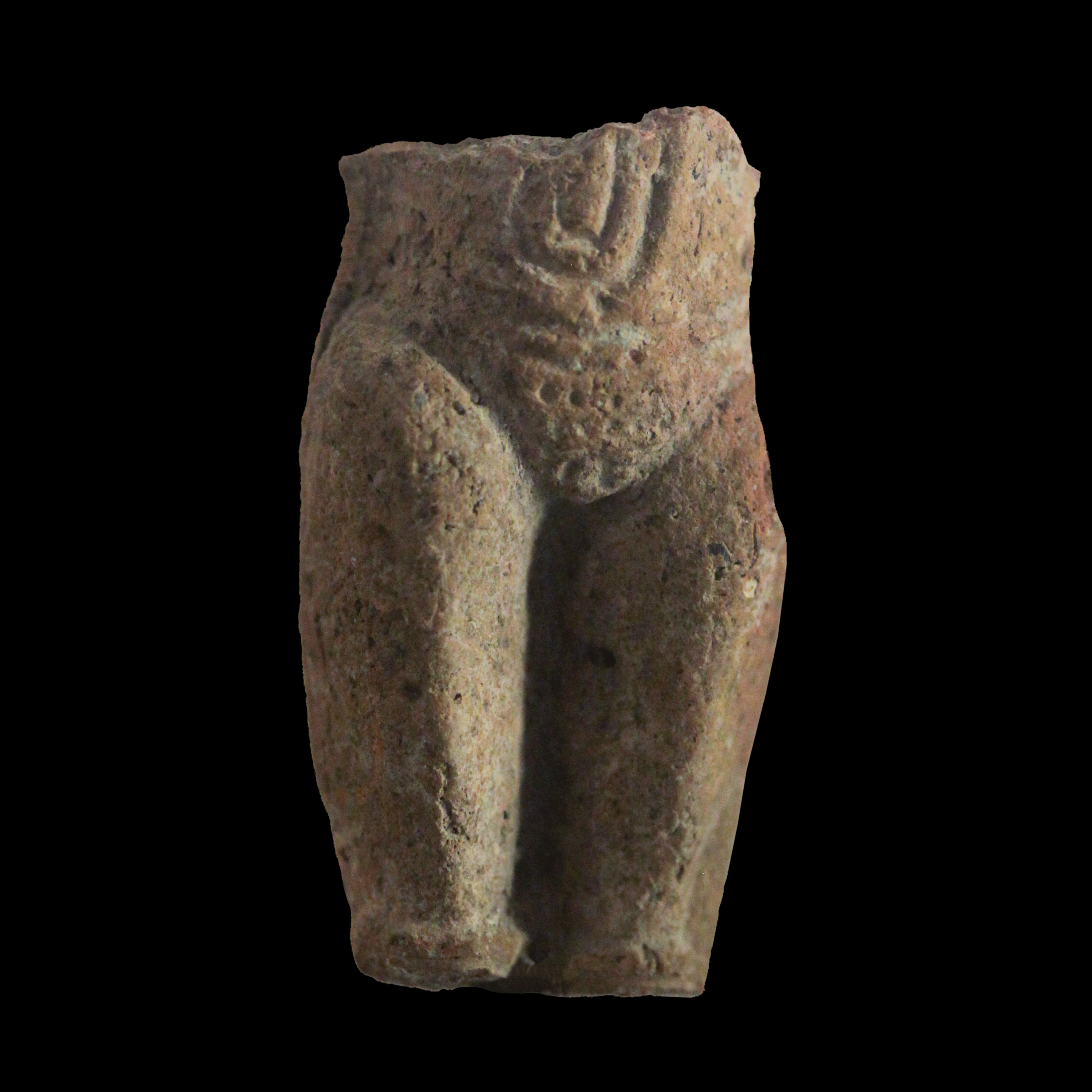
Female figurine-AO 21687-IMG 7860-black

The Neo-Assyrian city Sikan at nearby Ra's al-'Ayn was identified by Dietrich Opitz as the capital of Mitanni, Washukanni. The name Sikan was then believed to be an Assyrianized version of its Hurrian, or Indo-Aryan original, becoming (Wa-)Sikan(-ni). No epigraphic, glyphic or other archaeological evidence supporting this identification has yet emerged from excavations at this or other sites. The identification thus rests on a purely etymologic basis. The etymology is challenged by Edward Lipiński, who points out that Sikan is a Semitic name (meaning stele) already attested for the site circa 2000 BC. A clay tablet sent from Washukanni to Egypt was chemically analyzed and compared with samples from Sikan; the result was "no-match".

== Archaeology ==
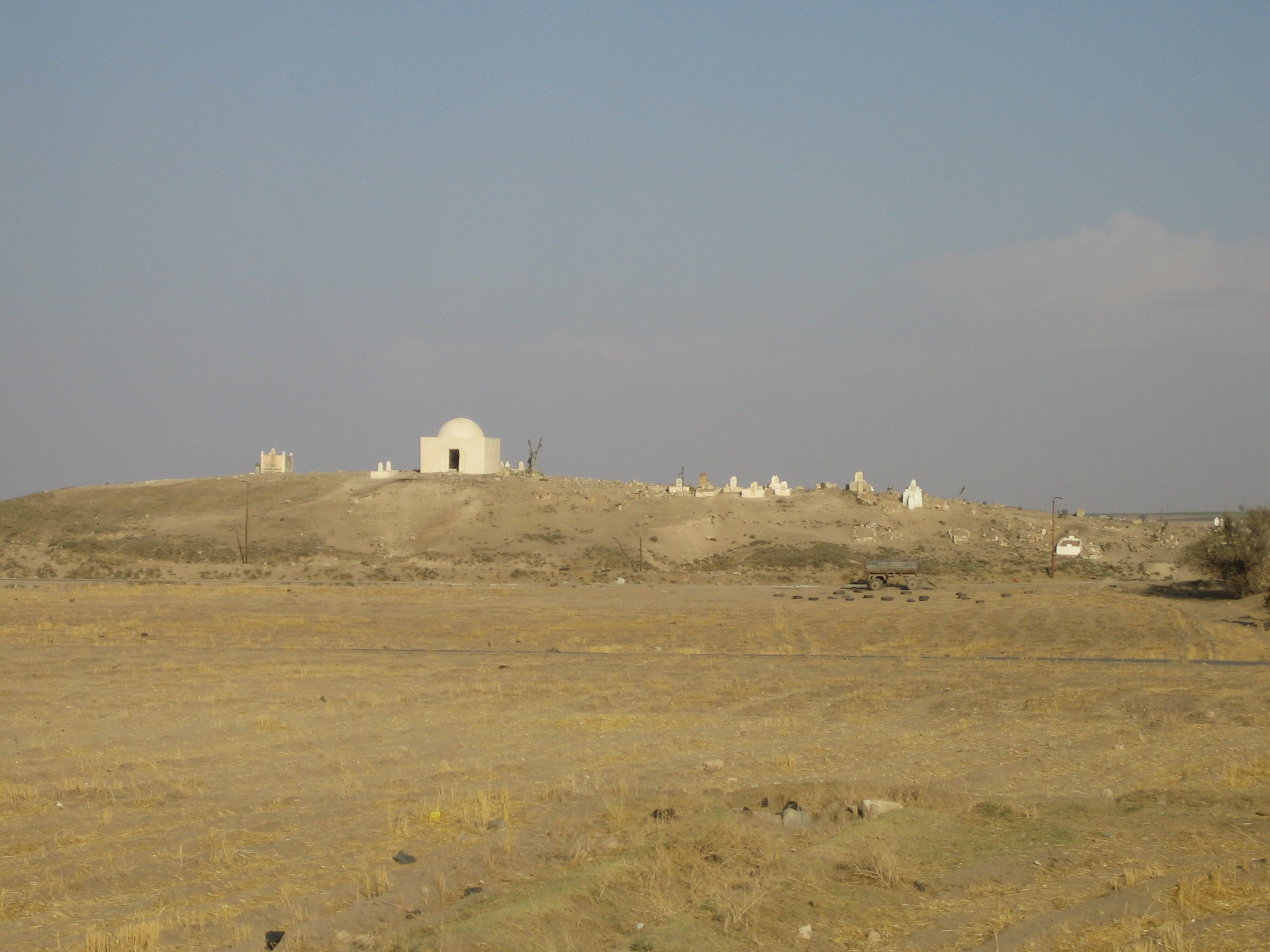
Tell Fecheriye, Syria.

The site is around 90 hectares in area, 12 of which are a high mound. Tell Fakhariyah came to the attention of Max von Oppenheim in the early 1900s. In 1929, during his excavations at Tell Halaf, he dispatched Felix Langenegger and Hans Lehmann to the site to do a field survey, resulting in the production of a contour map. In 1940, a team from the Oriental Institute of Chicago and the Boston Museum of Fine Arts, led by Calvin W. McEwan, and which included Harold D. Hill, worked for a short period there, conducted several soundings, developed a contour map of the site, and collected various pottery and epigraphic objects. The later included twelve tablets and some fragments. One of the Middle Assyrian tablets, from c. 13th century BC, indicated that the town's name was Dunnu at that time. The areas explored were mainly Middle Assyrian and Neo-Assyrian.

In 1955, Anton Moortgat conducted two soundings at Tell Fakhariyah, dated to the Mitanni empire period. A brief excavation occurred in 2001 by a team of University of Halle-Wittenberg and the Syrian Directorate-General of Antiquities and Museums led by A. Pruß. After a survey in 2005, a team from the Free University of Berlin and SAHI - Slovak archeological and historical institute and the Syrian Directorate-General of Antiquities and Museums resumed work at Tell Fakhariyah for a month in 2006. Excavations continued in 2007 for a period of 8 weeks. In the 2009 season, 11 Middle Assyrian cuneiform tablets were recovered from a layer early in the post-Mitanni period of the site.

In 2010, 40 texts and text fragments were found in the same context. Preliminary translation shows them to be administrative in nature. Eponyms link some to the 13th century BC reigns of Middle Assyrian rulers Shalmaneser I and Tukulti-Ninurta I. A number of related sealings and a few seals were also found.

== See also ==
- Cities of the Ancient Near East
- Hadad-yith'i
- Mitanni
