= The Gospel Coalition =

Evangelical Christian ministry

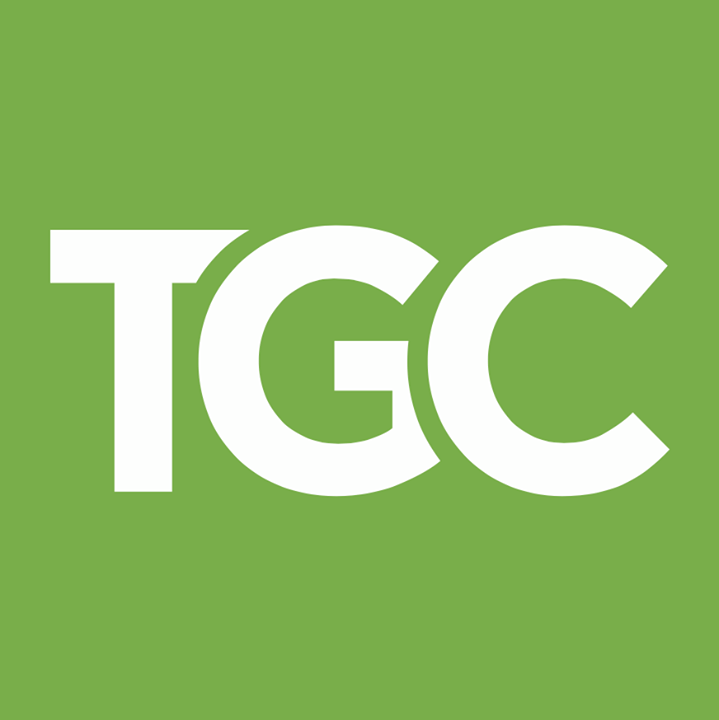
- Classification: Evangelical Christianity
- Theology: Reformed; New Calvinism
- Founders: D. A. Carson; Tim Keller
- President: Mark Vroegop
- Origin: 2004
- Official website: www.thegospelcoalition.org

The Gospel Coalition (TGC) is a broadly Reformed evangelical ministry best known for its media publication of the same name. It was initiated in 2004 by D. A. Carson and Tim Keller, and subsequently launched in 2007.

== History ==
Having been initiated in 2004 by theologian D. A. Carson and pastor Tim Keller, TGC describe their mission as being “deeply committed to renewing our faith in the gospel of Christ and to reforming our ministry practices to conform fully to the Scriptures.” The Gospel Coalition, Carson wrote in 2018, is "not a monolith; we are a coalition. What holds us together is our shared commitment to the gospel of Jesus Christ." As TGC describes itself in a promotional video, "We are not united by culture, nationality, or politics, but by the cross of Jesus Christ."

Originally founded as a pastors' colloquium, the organization evolved into a broader ministry centered on its online presence with its associated articles on theological, cultural and other topics. In the resources it produces, TGC seeks to apply scripture and gospel-centered approaches to contemporary culture, current events, and issues in everyday life. TGC regularly produces articles, videos, podcasts, and events, including an annual national conference.

In 2020, Julius Kim was appointed TGC president. In 2021, Baptist Pastor Juan Sánchez, of Austin, Texas, became board chairman. Sandy Willson was appointed as TGC's interim president in 2023. In 2025, Mark Vroegop was selected as third president. Its 20th conference is scheduled for 2025.

== Council ==
The leadership of the Gospel Coalition includes a group of 40+ active and emeritus members—mostly pastors—who form a council, "the primary stakeholders who provide leadership and vision for the work of The Gospel Coalition". A smaller group of representatives chosen by the council makes up the board, which sets the direction and provides oversight for TGC's president and staff.

Previous Council members include Mark Driscoll, who left in March 2012 as "part of a major reorganization of his priorities". In March 2014, Joshua Harris stepped down "in light of the ongoing civil suit against his church", and C.J. Mahaney resigned during the same period "for a variety of reasons". Darrin Patrick left the Council in April 2016 as a result of disciplinary action taken by his home church.

== Beliefs ==
The organization has an evangelical and Reformed confession of faith. Members are from a broad geographic and denominational spectrum (Anglicans, Baptists, Free Church pastors, Independents, and evangelical Presbyterians). It is broadly associated with New Calvinism.

== Journal ==
Themelios is an international peer-reviewed theological journal aimed at theological students and pastors that "expounds and defends the historic Christian faith". The journal began in 1975 and was operated by RTSF/UCCF in the UK, and it became a digital journal operated by TGC in 2008. The editorial team draws participants from across the globe as editors, essayists, and reviewers. Themelios is published three times a year online at TGC website.

== Criticism ==
In August 2025, John B. Carpenter, a Reformed Baptist pastor, alleged that the coalition engaged in anti-Baptist discriminatory practices, due to the editor's deletion of an article challenging paedobaptism and responding to criticisms of believer's baptism in the journal Themelios, even though it had been approved by an expert reviewer and guaranteed publication.
