= Paul Ellingworth =

British academic (1931–2018)

- Born: 15 November 1931; Barnsley, United Kingdom
- Died: 25 November 2018 (aged 87)
- Title: Honorary Professor in New Testament at the School of Divinity, History & Philosophy of the University of Aberdeen
- Spouse: Pauline Mary Coates
- Children: Three sons

Academic background
- Education: University of Cambridge, University of Oxford, Aberdeen University
- Thesis: The Old Testament in Hebrews Exegesis, Method and Hermeneutics (1977)

Academic work
- Discipline: Biblical studies
- Sub-discipline: New Testament studies
- Institutions: Aberdeen University
- Notable works: The Epistle to the Hebrews

Paul Ellingworth (15 November 1931 – 25 November 2018) was an Honorary Professor in New Testament at the School of Divinity, History & Philosophy of the University of Aberdeen and former translation consultant for the United Bible Societies. He wrote several books on biblical matters, notably on Hebrews. He lived in Aberdeen.

== Education ==
He studied as an undergraduate at Worcester College, Oxford; earning a Bachelor of Arts in 1953 and an MA in 1957. Moving to study further at Wesley House, Cambridge gaining another BA in 1956.

His doctoral thesis was The Old Testament in Hebrews Exegesis, Method and Hermeneutics which was completed in 1977 at Aberdeen University. Hebrews became his clear area of expertise and he returned to it repeatedly in his writing and speaking.

== Career ==
Ellingworth lectured in Benin at the École de Théologie, Porto-Novo from 1957-1961 after which in Cameroon at the Faculté de Théologie Protestante, Yaoundé for the period 1964-1967. He served as the Education Secretary to the Methodist Missionary Society based in London from 1967-1971. He specialised in translation work and during 1971 to 1975 was coordinator to the United Bible Societies, London. Based at his home in Aberdeen, United Kingdom he was from 1975 a translation consultant; also working as a technical editor 1972-1975.

He served as Associate Director at the Center for the Study of Christianity in the Non-Western World. He was an Honorary fellow University Edinburgh and additionally became Honorary lecturer University Aberdeen in 1983.

== Works ==
=== Books ===
- Ellingworth, Paul; Nida, Eugene A. (1975). Handbooks on 1-2 Thessalonians. United Bible Societies Helps for Translators series. Swindon: United Bible Societies. OCLC 3059660.
- ———; Nida, Eugene A. (1983). Handbooks on Hebrews. United Bible Societies Helps for Translators series. Swindon: United Bible Societies. ISBN 978-0-8267-0150-3. OCLC 9944522.
- ———; Hatton, Howard (1985). Handbooks on 1 Corinthians. United Bible Societies Helps for Translators series. Swindon: United Bible Societies. ISBN 978-0-8267-0140-4. OCLC 11815712.
- ——— (1991). The Epistle to the Hebrews. Epworth Commentaries. Peterborough: Epworth Press.
- ——— (1993). The Epistle to the Hebrews: A Commentary on the Greek Text. NIGTC. Grand Rapids, MI: Eerdmans. ISBN 978-0-802-87407-8. OCLC 27336310.

=== As translator ===
- Meurer, Siegfried, ed. (1991). The Apocrypha in Ecumenical Perspective: the place of the late writings of the Old Testament among the biblical writings and their significance in the eastern and western church traditions. UBS monograph series. Vol. 6. Translated by Ellingworth, Paul. Swindon, UK; New York: United Bible Societies. ISBN 978-0-8267-0456-6. OCLC 24471071.

=== Chapters ===
- ——— (2007). "From Martin Luther to the Revised English Version". In Noss, Philip A. (ed.). A History of Bible Translation. Rome: Edizioni de storia e letteratura. ISBN 978-8-8849-8373-2.
- ——— (2007). "Translation techniques in modern Bible translation". In Noss, Philip A. (ed.). A History of Bible Translation. Rome: Edizioni de storia e letteratura. ISBN 978-8-8849-8373-2.
- General editor and contributor, The Good News Study Bible (Swindon 1997)
- Translator for Religion Past and Present (Leiden) English version of Religion in Geschichte und Gegenwart, 4th edition

n.b. possible contributions to Dictionary of Bible Translation (Rome & New York, forthcoming)

=== Journal articles ===
- ——— (1964). "Christianity and Politics in Dahomey, 1843-1867". The Journal of African History. 5 (2): 209–220. doi:10.1017/s0021853700004813.
- ——— (October 1974). "Which way are we going : a verb of movement, especially in 1 Thess 4:14b". Bible Translator. 25 (4): 426–431. doi:10.1177/026009437402500405.
- ——— (April 1977). "Just Like Melchizedek". Bible Translator. 28 (2): 236–239. doi:10.1177/026009437702800207.
- ——— (July 1977). "Hans-Georg Gadamer: Truth and Method". Bible Translator. 28 (3): 335–343. doi:10.1177/026009357702800307.
- ——— (October 1978). "How Soon is 'Immediately' in Mark?". Bible Translator. 29 (4): 414–419. doi:10.1177/026009437802900403.
- ——— (January 1979). "Review Article: Marx and the Bible Translator". Bible Translator. 30 (1): 139–144. doi:10.1177/026009357903000106.
- ——— (April 1979). "How is your handbook wearing". Bible Translator. 30 (2): 236–241. doi:10.1177/026009437903000209.
- ——— (1979). "Hebrews and 1 Clement: Literary Dependence or Common Tradition". Biblische Zeitschrift. 23: 437–40.
- ——— (1983). ""Like the Son of God": Form and Content in Hebrews 7,1-10". Biblica. 64 (2): 255–262.
- ——— (January 1985). "Reading through Hebrews 1-7". Epworth Review. 12 (1): 80–88.
- ——— (October–December 1986). "Jesus and the Universe in Hebrews". The Evangelical Quarterly. 58 (4): 337–350.
- ——— (October–November 1988). "Hebrews and the Anticipation of Completion". Themelios. 14 (1): 6–11.
- ——— (April 2000). "(His) Disciples". Novum Testamentum. 42 (2): 114–126. doi:10.1163/156853600506807.

== Personal life ==
Ellingworth was born in Barnsley, England on 15 November 1931 the son of William C. and Olive Ellingworth. He married Pauline Mary Coates on 23 May 1959 and they had three sons.
