= Richard Longenecker =

American biblical scholar and academic (1930–2021)

Richard N. Longenecker
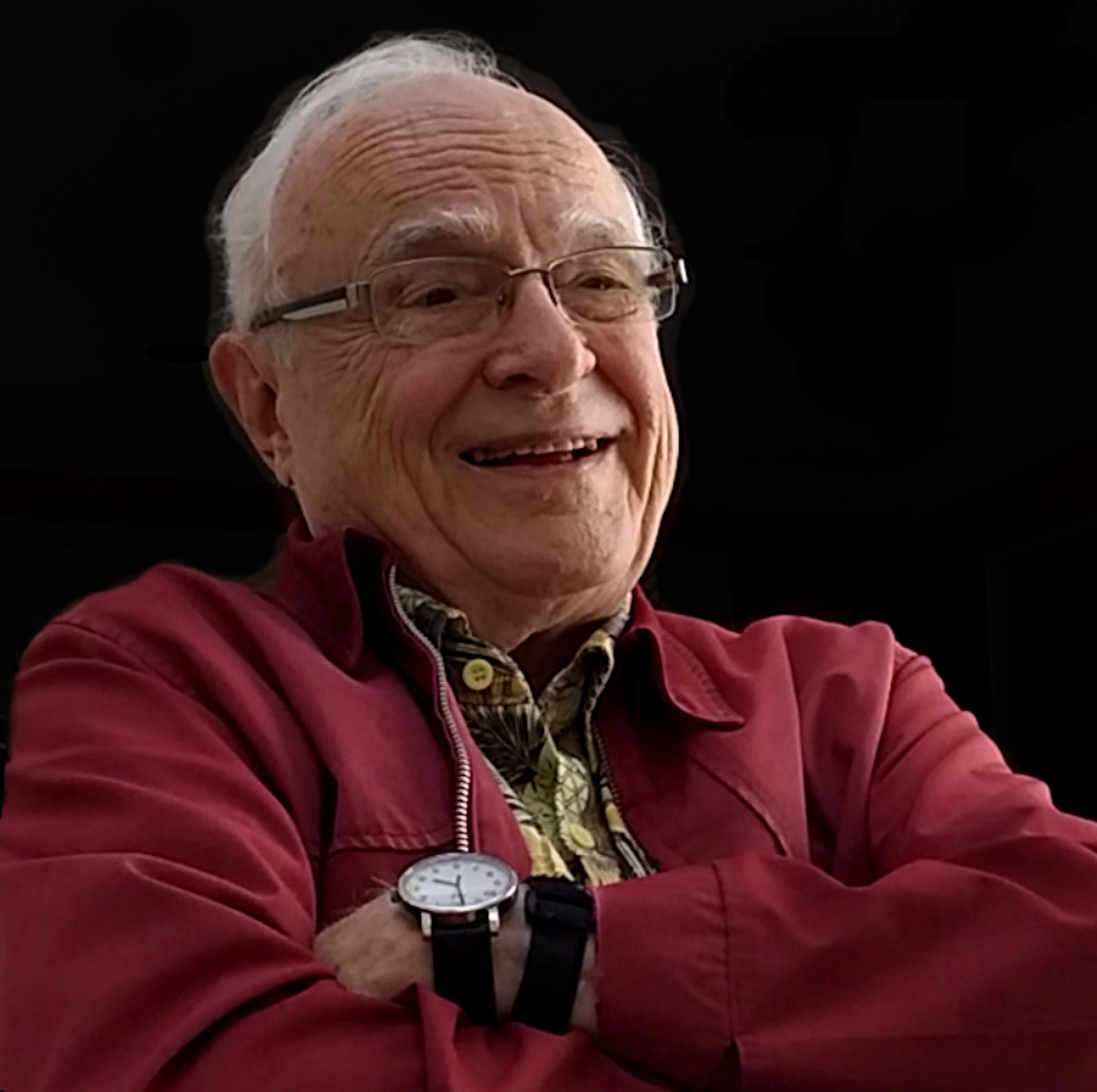
- Richard Longenecker in 2016
- Born: July 21, 1930; Mishawaka, Indiana, United States
- Died: June 7, 2021 (aged 90); Brantford, Ontario, Canada
- Occupation: New Testament academic
- Title: Distinguished Professor of New Testament at McMaster Divinity College
- Spouse: Frances Lee Wilson Longenecker
- Children: Beth Lougheed, Dave Longenecker, Bruce Longenecker

Academic background
- Education: University of Edinburgh, Wheaton College
- Alma mater: University of Edinburgh (PhD)
- Doctoral advisor: James S. Stewart

Academic work
- Discipline: Biblical studies
- Sub-discipline: New Testament studies
- Institutions: University of Toronto; McMaster Divinity College
- Main interests: Pauline Studies
- Notable works: Commentary on Romans, Paul Apostle of Liberty, Commentary on Galatians

Richard N. Longenecker (July 21, 1930 – June 7, 2021) was a New Testament scholar. He held teaching positions at Wheaton College and Graduate School (1954–57; 1960–63); Trinity Evangelical Divinity School (1963–72); Wycliffe College (Toronto, 1972–94, from which he received an honorary doctorate in 1996); University of St. Michael's College (Toronto, 1976–78); and McMaster Divinity College (Hamilton, 1994–2001). His education included B.A. and M.A. degrees from Wheaton College, and a Ph.D. from New College in the University of Edinburgh.

Longenecker is the author of numerous books and over fifty published articles in scholarly and professional journals. In Paul Apostle of Liberty (1964), he proposed views that would only later become mainstream in academic scholarship — such as the covenantal character of Jewish obedience to the Torah, and the importance to Paul's theology of the phrase “the faithfulness of Christ.” Other important books include his commentary on Galatians (1990), Introducing Romans (2011) and his commentary on Romans (2016).

In 1994, a Festschrift was published in his honor. Gospel in Paul: Studies on Corinthians, Galatians and Romans for Richard N. Longenecker included contributions from Linda Belleville, Terry Donaldson, James Dunn, Gordon Fee, Walter Hansen, John Hurd, Margaret Mitchell, Peter Richardson, Klyne Snodgrass, and N.T. Wright.

== Works ==
=== Books ===
- Longenecker, Richard N. (1971). The Ministry and Message of Paul. Contemporary Evangelical Perspectives. Grand Rapids, MI: Zondervan. ISBN 978-0-310-28341-6.
- _____ (1978). The Melchizedek Argument of Hebrews: A Study in the Development and Circumstantial Expression of New Testament Thought. Unity and Diversity in New Testament Theology. George Guelich and Robert A. Ladd (eds.) Eerdmans Press. ISBN 080283504X
- _______ (1977) The “Faith Of Abraham” Theme In Paul, James And Hebrews: A Study In The Circumstantial Nature Of New Testament Teaching. Journal of the Evangelical Theological Society. JETS 20:3 (Sep 1977)
- ______ (1974) "The Obedience of Christ in the Theology of the Early Church" in Reconciliation and Hope: Essays in honor of L .Morris. Robert Banks (ed.)
- ——— (1984). New Testament Social Ethics for Today. Grand Rapids, MI: Eerdmans. ISBN 978-0-802-81992-5.
- ——— (1984). "Acts". In Gaebelein, Frank E. (ed.). John and Acts. Expositor's Bible Commentary. Vol. 9 (Orig. ed.). Grand Rapids, MI: Zondervan. ISBN 978-0-310-36510-5.
- ——— (1990). Galatians. Word Biblical Commentary. Vol. 41. Thomas Nelson. ISBN 978-0-8499-0240-6.
- ——— (1994). The Christology of Early Jewish Christianity. Regent College Publishing. ISBN 978-1-5738-3029-4.
- ——— (1996). Patterns of Discipleship in the New Testament. McMaster New Testament Studies. Grand Rapids, MI: Eerdmans. ISBN 978-0-802-84169-8.
- ——— (1997). Road from Damascus: The Impact of Paul's Conversion on His Life, Thought, and Ministry. McMaster New Testament Studies. Grand Rapids, MI: Eerdmans. ISBN 978-0-802-84191-9.
- ——— (1999). Biblical Exegesis in the Apostolic Period. Grand Rapids, MI: Eerdmans. ISBN 978-0-802-84301-2.
- ——— (2000). New Wine into Fresh Wineskins: Contextualizing the Early Christian Confessions. Peabody, MA: Hendrickson. ISBN 978-1-5656-3098-7.
- ——— (2001). Into God's Presence: Prayer in the New Testament. McMaster New Testament Studies. Grand Rapids, MI: Eerdmans. ISBN 978-0-802-84883-3.
- ——— (2001). The Challenge of Jesus' Parables. McMaster New Testament Studies. Grand Rapids, MI: Eerdmans. ISBN 978-0-802-84638-9.
- ——— (2002). Community Formation: In the Early Church and in the Church Today. Grand Rapids, MI: Baker Academic. ISBN 978-0-801-04696-4.
- ———, ed. (2002). Life in the Face of Death: The Resurrection Message of the New Testament. McMaster New Testament Studies. Grand Rapids, MI: Eerdmans. ISBN 978-0-802-84474-3.
- ——— (2003). Paul, apostle of liberty. Twin brooks series. Regent College Publishing. ISBN 978-1-5738-3005-8.
- ——— (2005). Contours Of Christology In The New Testament. McMaster New Testament Studies. Grand Rapids, MI: Eerdmans. ISBN 978-0-802-81014-4.
- ——— (2005). "Acts". In Longman, Tremper; Garland, David E. (eds.). Luke-Acts. Expositor's Bible Commentary. Vol. 10 (rev. ed.). Grand Rapids, MI: Zondervan. ISBN 978-0-310-23500-2.
- ——— (2006). Studies in Paul, Exegetical and Theological. Sheffield: Sheffield Phoenix Press. ISBN 978-1-905-04867-0.
- ——— (2006). Studies in Hermeneutics, Christology and Discipleship. New Testament Monographs. Sheffield: Sheffield Phoenix Press. ISBN 978-1-905-04868-7.
- ——— (2011). Introducing Romans: Critical Concerns in Paul's Most Famous Letter. Grand Rapids, MI: Eerdmans. ISBN 978-0-802-86619-6.
- ——— (2015). Paul, Apostle of Liberty: The Origin and Nature of Paul's Christianity (2nd rev. ed.). Grand Rapids, MI: Eerdmans. ISBN 978-0-802-84302-9.
- ——— (2016). The Epistle to the Romans. New International Greek Testament Commentary. Grand Rapids, MI: Eerdmans. ISBN 978-0-802-82448-6.

=== Articles ===
- ——— (Summer 1969). "'Son of man' as a self-designation of Jesus". Journal of the Evangelical Theological Society. 12 (3): 151–58.
- ——— (1970). "Can We Reproduce the Exegesis of the New Testament?". Tyndale Bulletin. 21: 3–38. doi:10.53751/001c.30665.
- ——— (Winter 1975). "'Son of Man' Imagery: Some Implications for Theology and Discipleship". Journal of the Evangelical Theological Society. 18 (1): 3–16.
- ——— (1997). "Prolegomena to Paul's Use of Scripture in Romans". Bulletin for Biblical Research. 7: 145–68. doi:10.2307/26422324. JSTOR 26422324.
