= New International Greek Testament Commentary =

The New International Greek Testament Commentary (or NIGTC) is a series of commentaries in English on the text of the New Testament in Greek. It is published by the William B. Eerdmans Publishing Company. The current series editors are Todd D. Still and Mark Goodacre.

The individual volumes are as follows.

- Nolland, John (2005). The Gospel of Matthew. ISBN 978-0-8028-2389-2. 1,579 pages
- France, R. T. (2002). The Gospel of Mark. ISBN 978-0-8028-2446-2. 756 pages
- Marshall, I. Howard (1978). The Gospel of Luke. ISBN 978-0-8028-3512-3. 928 pages
- Longenecker, Richard N. (2016). The Epistle to the Romans. ISBN 978-0-802-82448-6. 1,140 pages
- Thiselton, Anthony C. (2000). The First Epistle to the Corinthians. ISBN 978-0-8028-2449-3. 1,479 pages
- Harris, Murray J. (2005). The Second Epistle to the Corinthians. ISBN 978-0-8028-2393-9. 1,072 pages
- Bruce, F. F. (1982). The Epistle to the Galatians. ISBN 978-0-8028-2387-8. 325 pages
- O'Brien, Peter T. (1991). The Epistle to the Philippians. ISBN 978-0-8028-2392-2. 638 pages
- Dunn, James D. G. (1996). The Epistles to the Colossians and to Philemon. ISBN 978-0-8028-2441-7. 405 pages
- Wanamaker, Charles A. (1990). The Epistles to the Thessalonians. ISBN 978-0-8028-2394-6. 344 pages
- Knight III, George W. (1992). The Pastoral Epistles. ISBN 978-0-8028-2395-3. 548 pages
- Ellingworth, Paul (1993). The Epistle to the Hebrews. ISBN 978-0-8028-2389-2. 862 pages
- Davids, Peter H. (1982). The Epistle of James. ISBN 978-0-8028-2388-5. 264 pages
- Beale, G. K. (1998). The Book of Revelation. ISBN 978-0-8028-2174-4. 1,309 pages

== Reviews ==
As with all such series by different authors, the quality varies from volume to volume. The reactions vary from "Superb 2 Corinthians commentary" to "Matthew – Every time I looked at this commentary, it seemed as though he was spending more time doing redaction criticism than actually explaining the text".

Other reviewers have different favourite volumes: "Ellingsworth is deep, informative and technical when it comes to the Greek text. That is the strength of this commentary, and for such he is definitely worth owning and consulting." On the 1 Corinthians volume by Thiselton, "A monster of commentary on this great book. It is extremely thorough and deep. It is amazing to think so much information is contained in one book".

== See also ==
- New International Commentary on the New Testament
- Word Biblical Commentary
- Textual criticism

== Select bibliography ==
- Aland, Kurt and others (eds). Novum Testamentum Graece. 27th edition (NA27). Stuttgart: Deutsche Bibelgesellschaft.
- Metzger, Bruce and others (eds). The Greek New Testament. 4th edition (UBS4). New York: United Bible Societies.
