= Andrew G. Shead =

College teacher

- Education: University of Cambridge
- Occupation: University teacher
- Employer: Moore Theological College (1992–)

Andrew G. Shead is head of the Old Testament department at Moore Theological College, Sydney, Australia, where he lectures in Hebrew, Old Testament and music.

== Life ==
Shead earned a BSc (Med) (Sydney), a BTh, a MTh (ACT) and a PhD (Cantab). From 1998 Shead holds a PhD at the University of Cambridge with his doctoral dissertation Jeremiah 32 in its Hebrew and Greek Recensions under supervision of Robert P. Gordon.

He has been on the faculty at Moore College since 1992. Among Shead's research interests it is included the book of Jeremiah, textual criticism, Hebrew poetry, and biblical theology.

From 2016, Shead is a member of the New International Version Committee on Bible Translation, and maintains relationships with other international university educators.

Shead is married and has three children. Shead has served in a number of churches around Sydney as an ordained Anglican minister.

== Works ==
Shead's most important "contribution to biblical theology" are insights into the book of Jeremiah, ("diachronic interest in the reconstruction of the compositional stages of the Book of Jeremian in both its Masoretic (MT) and Septuagint (LXX) forms") referred as "a valuable contribution to the continuation of the debate". According to Dines "the nub of the question is whether the LXX reflects a Hebrew text 'earlier' and 'better' than that enshrined in the MT, and "Shead has provided a wealth of material and argumentation for further debate. Nobody working on the history of Jeremiah, or on the character of LXX Jeremiah, should ignore his finding, or the path by which he has so patiently crawled towards them". Sweeney claim that "although the details of S.'s somewhat harmonistic argumentation may be challenged at various point, he succeeds in demonstrating the complexity of text-critical work in Jeremiah. Williamson affirm that the Shead's study is "careful and detailed research that obviously lies behind this presentation means that it will rapidly establish itself as a major contribution to a topic which has dominated Jeremiah studies for at least thirty years and which was prominent for many decades even before that".

=== Thesis ===
- Shead, Andrew G. (1998). Jeremiah 32 in Its Hebrew and Greek Recensions (PhD thesis at the University of Cambridge).

=== Books ===
- Shead, Andrew G. (2002). The Open Book and the Sealed Book: Jeremiah 32 in its Hebrew and Greek Recensions. The Library of Hebrew Bible/Old Testament Studies. Bloomsbury Publishing. ISBN 9780567267504. OCLC 827085904.
- Shead, Andrew G. (2012). A mouth full of fire: the word of God in the words of Jeremiah. New Studies in Biblical Theology. Vol. 29. Downers Grove, Ill.: Apollos. ISBN 978-1844745968. OCLC 794032550.

=== Articles ===
- Shead, A. G. (1999). "Review of Buchgestalten des Jeremiabuches: Untersuchungen zur Redaktions- und Rezeptionsgeschichte von Jer 30-33 im Kontext des Buches, by K. Schmid". Vetus Testamentum. 49 (4): 558–562. doi:10.1163/156853399323228452. JSTOR 1585420.
- Shead, A. G. (2000). "Shabbath". In Alexander, T. D.; Rosner, Brian S.; Carson, D. A.; Goldsworthy, Graeme; Carter, Steve (eds.). New Dictionary of Biblical Theology. Leicester: Inter-Varsity Press and Downers Grove: InterVarsity Press. pp. 745–750. ISBN 9780830814381.
