= Charles A. Wanamaker =

- Born: 1949 (age 76–77)
- Occupation: New Testament academic
- Title: Professor of Christian Studies at the University of Cape Town

Academic background
- Education: Durham University
- Thesis: The Son and the Sons of God A study in the elements of Paul's christological and soteriological thought. (1980)

Academic work
- Discipline: Biblical studies
- Main interests: New Testament and Early Christianity
- Notable works: The Epistle to the Thessalonians (NIGTC)

Charles A. Wanamaker (born 1949) is the Professor of Christian Studies at the University of Cape Town. He specializes in New Testament and Early Christianity studies, with a special interest in the application of socio-rhetorical analysis to the study of the writings of Paul. Wanamaker was educated at the University of Durham. Currently working on a socio-rhetorical commentary on 1 Corinthians.

His doctoral thesis earned at Durham University in 1980 was entitled "The Son and the Sons of God : a study in the elements of Paul's christological and soteriological thought".

Wanamaker is married to Helena.

== Current Research ==
He has a Socio-Rhetorical Commentary on 1 Corinthians in preparation to be published by Deo Press and Westminster/John Knox Press. Also, he is preparing a translation of 3 Maccabees for The Lexham Greek-English Interlinear Septuagint.

== Selected works ==
=== Books ===
- The Epistle to the Thessalonians: A Commentary on the Greek Text. New International Greek Testament Commentary. Grand Rapids: Eerdmans. 1990. ISBN 978-0-8028-7092-6.

=== Articles ===
- Wanamaker, Charles A. (1986). "Christ as Divine Agent in Paul". Scottish Journal of Theology. 39 (4): 517–528. doi:10.1017/S0036930600031100.
- Wanamaker, Charles A. (2003). "Philippians". In Dunn, James D. G.; Rogerson, John W. (eds.). Eerdmans Commentary on the Bible. Grand Rapids: Eerdmans. pp. 1394–1403. ISBN 0-8028-3711-5.
