= Andreas J. Köstenberger =

American theologian

Andreas Johannes Köstenberger
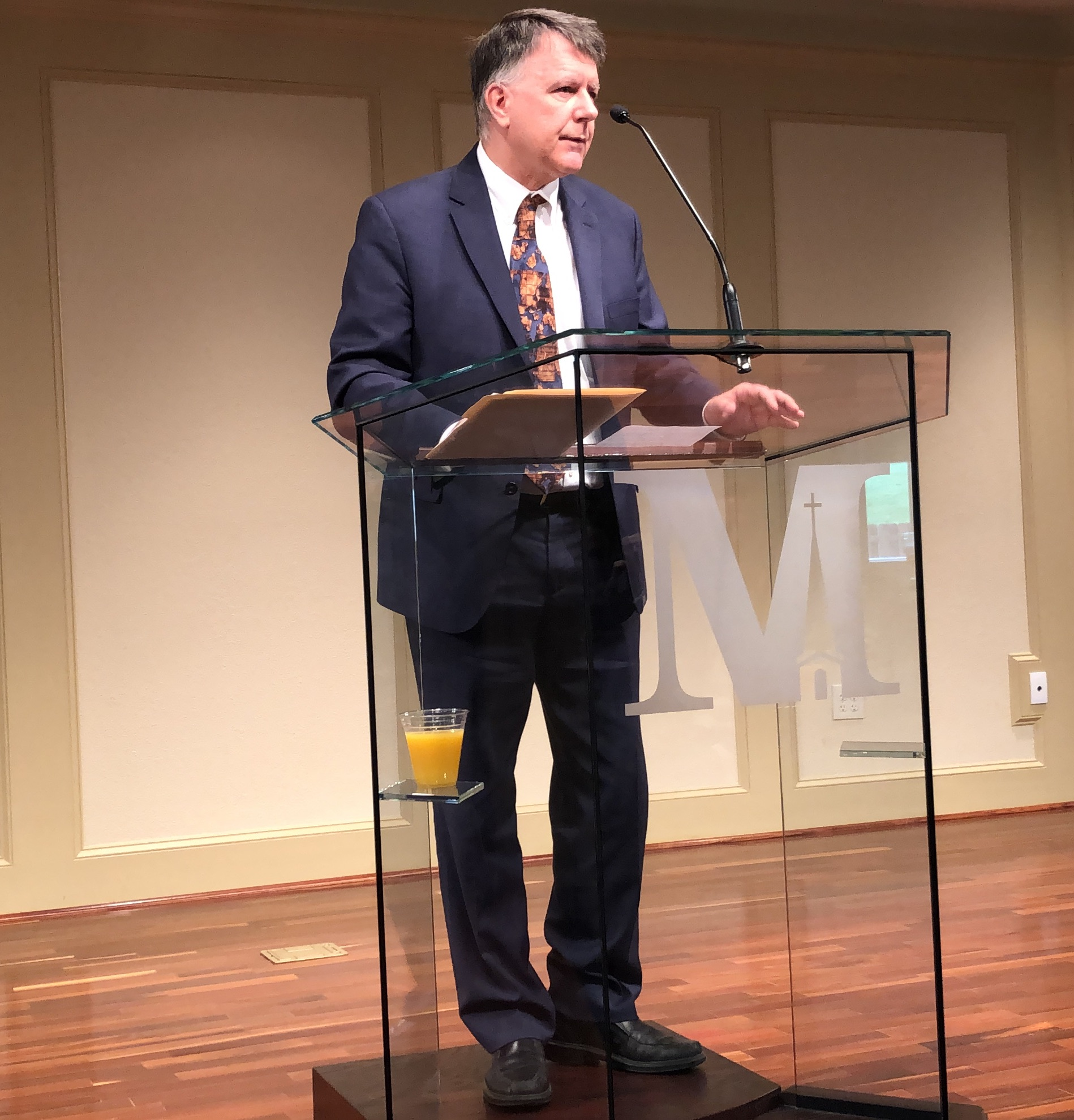
- Born: November 2, 1957 (age 69); Vienna, Austria
- Occupation: Biblical scholar
- Title: Research Professor at Midwestern Baptist Theological Seminary
- Board member of: Editor of the Journal of the Evangelical Theological Society
- Spouse: Margaret (Gerrard)

Academic background
- Education: Vienna University of Economics and Business (MSc, PhD); Columbia International University (MDiv); Trinity Evangelical Divinity School (PhD)
- Theses: Jugend und Theater (Economics) (1982); The Missions of Jesus and the Disciples according to the Fourth Gospel (New Testament) (1993)
- Doctoral advisor: D. A. Carson (New Testament)

Academic work
- Discipline: Biblical studies
- Institutions: Southeastern Baptist Theological Seminary (1996-2018); Midwestern Baptist Theological Seminary (2018-2022); Palm Beach Atlantic University
- Main interests: Gospel of John, biblical theology, and hermeneutics

Andreas Johannes Köstenberger (born November 2, 1957) is an Austrian-American Biblical scholar, who was research professor at Midwestern Baptist Theological Seminary. Until 2018, he was Senior Research Professor of New Testament and Biblical Theology at Southeastern Baptist Theological Seminary (SEBTS) in Wake Forest, North Carolina. Kostenberger now teaches in an adjunct position at BJU Seminary in Greenville, SC. His primary research interests are the Gospel of John, biblical theology, and hermeneutics.

== Life ==
Köstenberger was born on November 2, 1957, in Vienna, Austria, where he was raised in the Roman Catholic Church. As a young man, Köstenberger converted to Evangelicalism.

At the age of twenty-seven, Köstenberger left Austria for the United States to pursue theological studies at Columbia Bible College and Graduate School of Missions. In 1990 Köstenberger began doctoral studies at Trinity Evangelical Divinity School under D. A. Carson, submitting his dissertation on the mission motif in the Gospel of John in 1993.

Köstenberger then taught at Briercrest Bible College for two years, returned to Trinity for a one-year teaching position to cover for D. A. Carson while he was on sabbatical (during which time, in 1996, Köstenberger received an "Award for Scholarly Productivity" from Trinity), and then took a teaching position at Southeastern Baptist Theological Seminary (SEBTS) in 1996, where he was Senior Research Professor of New Testament and Biblical Theology.

He was for 22 years editor of the Journal of the Evangelical Theological Society and founder of Biblical Foundations, an organization that "exists to strengthen the biblical foundations of the family, the church, and society."

== Allegations of Plagiarism ==
In 2017, Köstenberger's commentary on John in the Baker Exegetical Commentary was withdrawn from publication when the author reported "a series of inadvertently unattributed references." Several biblical scholars called it plagiarism. Subsequently, Zondervan publishers also retracted their Illustrated Bible Commentary, Volume 2: New Testament series. The unattributed references were from The Gospel According to John, by D. A. Carson, who was Köstenberger's doctoral advisor.

== Bibliography ==
Among the many works by Köstenberger are:

- Invitation to Biblical Interpretation (2013)
- Truth Matters (2015, co-authored with Josh Chatraw and Darrell Bock)
- The Cradle, the Cross, and the Crown: An Introduction to the New Testament (2016,2nd Ed, co-authored with L. Scott Kellum and Charles L. Quarles)
- The Holy Spirit (2020, co-authored with Gregg Allison)
- Biblical Theology (2023, co-authored with Gregory Goswell)
