= Alan Millard =

British orientalist (1937–2024)

- Born: 1 December 1937; England, United Kingdom
- Died: 6 June 2024 (aged 86); Leamington Spa, England, United Kingdom
- Spouse: Margaret Sibley
- Children: Clare, Stephen, and Jonathan

Alan Ralph Millard FSA (1 December 1937 – 6 June 2024) was a British orientalist who was Rankin Professor of Hebrew and Ancient Semitic languages, and Honorary Senior Fellow (Ancient Near East), at the School of Archaeology, Classics and Egyptology (SACE) in the University of Liverpool.

Millard worked on excavations at Tell Nebi Mend (ancient Qadesh-on-the-Orontes) and Tell Rif'at (ancient Arpad) in Syria, at Petra in Jordan, and at the Assyrian capital Nimrud (ancient Kalḫu) in Iraq. While working at the British Museum 1961–1964, he rediscovered the Epic of Atrahasis, which had lain unrecognised in a drawer for some decades. From 1964 to 1970, he was Librarian at Tyndale House, Cambridge, and taught Akkadian for a year at the School of Oriental and African Studies (SOAS) in the University of London. In 1970, he was appointed Rankin Lecturer in Hebrew and Ancient Semitic Languages at the University of Liverpool. He was a Fellow at the Institute of Advanced Studies (IAS) in the Hebrew University of Jerusalem in 1984, studying in a team led by Yigael Yadin. His main interest lay in Semitic epigraphy, and in editing Akkadian cuneiform tablets and Aramaic inscriptions. Scribal practices in the ancient Near East remained a dominant concern for him; the importance he ascribed to this topic stems largely from his belief as an Evangelical Christian in the essential historicity of the Bible – a point of view he shared with his colleague at Liverpool, the Egyptologist Kenneth Kitchen.

Millard was a Fellow of the Society of Antiquaries of London, a member of the Society for Old Testament Study – and was also Vice-Chairman of the British School of Archaeology in Iraq. He died on 6 June 2024, at the age of 86.

== Publications ==
- Atrahasis: The Babylonian Story of the Flood (with W.G. Lambert), Clarendon Press, Oxford (1969); reprinted Eisenbrauns, Winona Lake, Indiana, ISBN 1-57506-039-6 (1999)
- Millard, Alan. R. (1970). "Covenant and Communion in First Corinthians" (PDF). In Gasque, W. Ward; Martin, Ralph P. (eds.). Apostolic history and the gospel: Biblical and historical essays presented to F. F. Bruce on his 60th birthday. Exeter: Paternoster. pp. 242–8. ISBN 0-85364-098-X. Archived from the original (PDF) on 3 March 2016.
- Millard, Alan. R. (January 1977). "Approaching the Old Testament". Themelios. 2 (2): 34–9.
- Daniel 1–6 and History (1977)
- Millard, Alan. R. (1980). "Methods of Studying the Patriarchal Narratives as Ancient Texts". In Millard, Alan R.; Wiseman, D. J. (eds.). Essays on the Patriarchal Narratives. Leicester: Inter-Varsity Press. pp. 43–58. ISBN 0-85111-743-0.
- La Statue de Tell Fekherye et son inscription bilingue assyro-araméenne (with A. Abou-Assaf and P. Bordreuil), Association pour la diffusion de la pensée française, Paris (1982)
- Millard, Alan. R. (1982). "In Praise of Ancient Scribes". Biblical Archaeologist. 45 (3): 145–53. doi:10.2307/3209809. JSTOR 3209809. S2CID 14435209. Reprinted as: Millard, Alan. R. (1982). "In Praise of Ancient Scribes". Bible and Spade. 2: 33–46. Archived from the original on 13 February 2007.
- Discoveries from the Time of Jesus (1990)
- Millard, Alan. R. (1991). "Texts and Archaeology: Weighing The Evidence". Palestine Exploration Quarterly: 19–27. doi:10.1179/peq.1991.123.1.19.
- Millard, Alan. R. (1991). "Solomon: Text and Archaeology". Palestine Exploration Quarterly. 123 (2): 117–8. doi:10.1179/peq.1991.123.2.117.
- The Eponyms of the Assyrian Empire, 910–612 BC, State Archives of Assyria Studies 2, The Neo-Assyrian Text Corpus Project, University of Helsinki (1994)
- The Knowledge of Writing in Iron Age Palestine (1995)
- Discoveries from Bible Times, Lion Publishing, Oxford (1997)
- Dictionary of the Ancient Near East (edited, with Piotr Bienkowski), British Museum Press, London (2000)
- Reading and Writing in the Time of Jesus, Sheffield Academic Press, Sheffield (2000)
- Millard, Alan. R. (2000). "How Reliable Is Exodus?". Biblical Archaeology Review. 26 (4): 50–7. Archived from the original on 4 January 2015.
- Millard, Alan. R. (2003). "Literacy in the time of Jesus: Could his words have been recorded in his lifetime?". Biblical Archaeology Review. 29 (4): 36–45. Archived from the original on 24 August 2007.

== See also ==
- Assyriology
- Garden of Eden
