= Westminster Theological Journal =

- Discipline: Theology
- Language: English
- Edited by: K. Scott Oliphint

Publication details
- History: 1938-present
- Publisher: Westminster Theological Seminary (United States)
- Frequency: Semi-annually

Standard abbreviations
- ISO 4: Westminst. Theol. J.

Indexing
- ISSN: 0043-4388

Links
- Journal homepage

The Westminster Theological Journal is an evangelical theological journal published by Westminster Theological Seminary and edited by K. Scott Oliphint.
