= Tyndale Bulletin =

- Discipline: Theology
- Language: English

Publication details
- History: 1956-present
- Publisher: Tyndale House
- Frequency: Rolling/Annual

Standard abbreviations
- ISO 4: Tyndale Bull.

Indexing
- ISSN: 0082-7118
- OCLC no.: 3148240

Links
- Journal homepage

The Tyndale Bulletin is an academic journal published by Tyndale House in Cambridge, England. The publication began life as The Tyndale House Bulletin in the Summer of 1956, edited by Tyndale House's Librarian Andrew Walls. Sixteen issues of The Tyndale House Bulletin were produced and in 1966 it was replaced by an annual publication of 160 pages – the Tyndale Bulletin. The editor of the new publication was Alan R. Millard, while the first editorial board consisted of F.F. Bruce, Ralph P. Martin, Donald J. Wiseman, Derek Kidner, and Ronald Inchly. In 1989 (Volume 40) the Bulletin became bi-annual, and from 2021 (Volume 72) a pattern of rolling online publication of articles was adopted, with articles from each year subsequently collated in a single print volume. New articles, together with the full archive, are available on an open access basis at the Tyndale Bulletin website.

In a survey of New Testament studies in Europe, Robert Yarbrough suggests that the Tyndale Bulletin "has for decades published cutting-edge research across the full range of New Testament topics."

It is important to distinguish this journal from another of the same name as in 1945 the Inter-Varsity Fellowship (IVF) renamed its Theological Notes (edited by Alan M. Stibbs and F.F. Bruce) as The Tyndale Bulletin. This publication was incorporated into The Christian Graduate in 1948.
