= D. A. Carson =

Canadian Reformed evangelical theologian (born 1946)

The Reverend Dr D. A. Carson
- Born: Donald Arthur Carson; December 21, 1946 (age 79); Montreal, Quebec, Canada
- Spouse: Joy Wheildon (m. 1975)

Ecclesiastical career
- Religion: Christianity (Baptist)
- Ordained: 1972

Academic background
- Education: McGill University (BS); Central Baptist Seminary (MDiv); University of Cambridge (PhD)
- Thesis: Predestination and Responsibility (1975)
- Doctoral advisor: Barnabas Lindars
- Influences: Cornelius Van Til

Academic work
- Discipline: Biblical studies; theology
- Sub-discipline: Biblical theology; New Testament studies
- School or tradition: Evangelicalism; Reformed Baptistism
- Institutions: Trinity Evangelical Divinity School
- Doctoral students: Andreas J. Köstenberger

Donald Arthur Carson (born December 21, 1946) is a Canadian evangelical theologian. He is a Distinguished Emeritus Professor of New Testament at Trinity Evangelical Divinity School and president and co-founder of the Gospel Coalition. He has written or edited about sixty books (or more) and served as president of the Evangelical Theological Society in 2022.

Carson has been described as doing "the most seminal New Testament work by contemporary evangelicals" and as "one of the last great Renaissance men in evangelical biblical scholarship." He has written on a wide range of topics including New Testament, hermeneutics, biblical theology, the Greek New Testament, the use of the Old Testament in the New, and more.

== Early life and education ==
He studied at McGill University in sciences and earned a Bachelor of Science in 1967, a Master of Divinity from Heritage College & Seminary in 1970, and a Doctor of Philosophy in New Testament from the University of Cambridge in 1975.

== Career ==
In 1975, he became professor of New Testament at the Northwest Baptist Seminary (Fellowship of Evangelical Baptist Churches in Canada) in Langley, British Columbia.

Carson joined the Trinity Evangelical Divinity School faculty in 1978 after then dean, Kenneth Kantzer, heard him deliver a paper at a theological conference. Carson served as Associate Professor of New Testament until 1982 when he became full professor. From 1991 to 2018, Carson was Research Professor of New Testament. He is now Emeritus Professor of New Testament.

Carson has authored and edited over 60 books. He has also served as editor of Themelios.

In 2005, Carson founded The Gospel Coalition along with pastor Tim Keller. The Gospel Coalition is known for its popular website, conferences, and other resource materials. Carson was the President of The Gospel Coalition until January 20, 2020, when Julius Kim was selected as his successor. Carson transitioned to the role of Theologian-at-Large.

In 2011, a Festschrift was published in his honor, entitled Understanding the Times: New Testament Studies in the 21st Century: Essays in Honor of D. A. Carson on the Occasion of His 65th Birthday. Contributors included Andreas J. Köstenberger, Grant Osborne, Mark Dever, Douglas Moo, Peter O'Brien, and Craig Blomberg. In 2017, a second Festschrift was published, Serving the Church, Reaching the World: Essays in Honour of Don Carson, which included contributions from William Edgar, David Jackman, Mike Ovey, J. I. Packer, and John Piper.

== Personal life ==
Carson married Joy (née Wheildon) on August 16, 1975.

== Select works ==
=== Books ===
- Carson, D. A. (1979). The King James Version Debate: A Plea for Realism. Grand Rapids, MI: Baker Books. ISBN 0-8010-2427-7.
- ——— (1984). Exegetical Fallacies. Grand Rapids, MI: Baker Books. ISBN 0-8010-2499-4.
- ——— (1987). Showing the Spirit: A Theological Exposition of 1 Corinthians 12–14. Grand Rapids, MI: Baker Books. ISBN 978-0-801-02521-1.
- ——— (1990). How Long, O Lord?: Reflections on Suffering and Evil. Grand Rapids, MI: Baker Academic. ISBN 0-8010-3125-7.
- ———; Morris, Leon; Moo, Douglas J. (1991). An Introduction to the New Testament. Grand Rapids, MI: Zondervan. ISBN 978-0-310-51940-9. OCLC 24218222.
- ——— (1991). The Gospel according to John. PNTC. Grand Rapids, MI: Eerdmans. ISBN 0-851-11749-X.
- ——— (1992). A Call to Spiritual Reformation: Priorities from Paul and His Prayers (1st ed.). Downers Grove, IL: Inter-Varsity Press. ISBN 978-0-851-10976-3.
- ——— (1993). The Cross and Christian Ministry: Leadership Lessons from 1 Corinthians. Grand Rapids, MI: Baker Academic. ISBN 0-8010-9168-3.
- ———; Woodbridge, John D. (1993). Letters along the Way: A Novel of the Christian Life. Wheaton, Il.: Crossway Books. ISBN 9780891076735. OCLC 27034503.
- ——— (1996). Basics for Believers: An Exposition of Philippians. Grand Rapids, MI: Baker Academic. ISBN 978-0801054945.
- ——— (1998). The Inclusive Language Debate: A Plea for Realism. Downers Grove, IL: Inter-Varsity Press. ISBN 0-85111-584-5.
- ——— (1999). The Difficult Doctrine of the Love of God. Wheaton, IL: Crossway Books. ISBN 1-58134-126-1.
- ——— (1998). For the Love of God, 2 volume devotional commentary based on Robert Murray M'Cheyne's system for reading the Bible through in one year. Wheaton, IL: Crossway Books. ISBN 1-58134-815-0.
- ——— (2000). Telling the Truth: Evangelizing Postmoderns. Grand Rapids, MI: Zondervan. ISBN 978-0-310-24334-2.
- ——— (2002). Divine Sovereignty and Human Responsibility: Biblical Perspective in Tension. Eugene, OR: Wipf and Stock. ISBN 978-1-579-10859-5.
- ——— (2002). Gagging of God, The: Christianity Confronts Pluralism. Grand Rapids, MI: Zondervan. ISBN 978-0-310-24286-4.
- ——— (2005). Becoming Conversant with the Emerging Church: Understanding a Movement and Its Implications. Grand Rapids, MI: Zondervan. ISBN 0-310-25947-9.
- ———; Moo, Douglas J. (2005). An Introduction to the New Testament (rev. 2nd ed.). Grand Rapids, MI: Zondervan. ISBN 978-0-310-23859-1.
- ——— (2008). Christ and Culture Revisited. Grand Rapids, MI: Baker Academic. ISBN 978-0-8028-3174-3.
- ——— (2008). Memoirs of an Ordinary Pastor: The Life and Reflections of Tom Carson. Wheaton, IL: Crossway Books. ISBN 978-1-4335-0199-9.
- ——— (2009). The Intolerance of Tolerance. Grand Rapids, MI: Eerdmans. ISBN 978-0-802-83170-5. OCLC 768806216.
- ——— (2009). Evangelicalism: What Is It and Is It Worth Keeping?. Wheaton, IL: Crossway Books. ISBN 978-1-43351122-6. OCLC 1433511223.
- ——— (2010). Scandalous: The Cross and Resurrection of Jesus. Wheaton, IL: Crossway Books. ISBN 978-1-4335-1125-7.
- ——— (2010). Sermon on the Mount: An Exposition of Matthew 5–7. Paternoster. ISBN 978-1-850-78889-8.
- ——— (2010). The God Who Is There: Finding Your Place In God's Story. Grand Rapids, MI: Baker Books. ISBN 978-0-801-01372-0.
- ——— (2012). Jesus the Son of God: A Christological Title Often Overlooked, Sometimes Misunderstood, and Currently Disputed. Wheaton, IL: Crossway Books. ISBN 978-1-43353796-7.
- ——— (2015). Praying with Paul: A Call To Spiritual Reformation (2nd ed.). Grand Rapids, MI: Baker Academic. ISBN 978-0-801-09710-2. – revised edition of A Call to Spiritual Reformation of 1992

=== As editor ===
- ———; Woodbridge, John D., eds. (1995). Hermeneutics, Authority, and Canon. Carlisle, UK: Paternoster Press. ISBN 9780801020506. OCLC 32312885.
- ———; Seifrid, Mark A.; O'Brien, Peter T., eds. (2001). Justification And Variegated Nomism. Vol. 1: The Complexities of Second Temple Judaism. Grand Rapids, MI: Baker Academic. ISBN 978-0-8010-2272-2.
- ———; Seifrid, Mark A.; O'Brien, Peter T., eds. (2004). Justification and Variegated Nomism. Vol. 2: The Paradoxes of Paul. Grand Rapids, MI: Baker Academic. ISBN 978-0-8010-2741-3.
- ———; Beale, G. K., eds. (2008). Commentary on the New Testament Use of the Old Testament. Grand Rapids, MI: Baker Academic. ISBN 978-0-8010-2693-5.
- ———; Keller, Timothy, eds. (2012). The Gospel as Center: Renewing Our Faith and Reforming Our Ministry Practices. Gospel Coalition Booklets. Wheaton, IL: Crossway Books. ISBN 978-1-43351561-3. OCLC 730405327.
- ———, ed. (2016). The Enduring Authority of the Christian Scriptures. Downers Grove, IL: Inter-Varsity Press. ISBN 978-1-78359460-3.

=== Chapters and contributions ===
- ——— (1984). "Matthew". In Gaebelein, Frank E. (ed.). Expositor's Bible Commentary: Matthew-Luke. Vol. 8. Grand Rapids, MI: Zondervan. ISBN 978-0-310-36500-6.

=== Articles ===
- ——— (June 1993). "Evil and Suffering in the World of a Good and Sovereign God". Reaper: 6–9, 36.
- ——— (April 25, 1994). "Five Gospels, No Christ: In their attempt to rescue the Bible from conservatives, scholars in the Jesus Seminar became liberal fundamentalists". Christianity Today. 38 (5): 30–33.
- ——— (August 1995). "Jesus the Temple of God". The Evangelical Magazine of Wales: 8–9.
- ——— (November 15, 1999). "Are Christians Required to Tithe?". Christianity Today. 43 (13): 94.
- ——— (1999). "On Distorting the Love of God". Bibliotheca Sacra. 156: 3–12.

== Sources ==
- Garrett, James Leo (2009), Baptist Theology: A Four-century Study, USA: Mercer University Press
