= Craig Blomberg =

American New Testament scholar

Craig L. Blomberg
- Born: August 3, 1955 (age 71)
- Known for: New Testament Matthew, parables, miracles, historical Jesus, Luke-Acts, John, 1 Corinthians, James), historical trustworthiness, New Testament theology, stewardship and money matters, and gender roles.

Academic background
- Education: Augustana College, B.A. Trinity Evangelical Divinity School, M.A.
- Alma mater: University of Aberdeen, Ph.D.
- Thesis: The Tradition History of the Parables Peculiar to Luke's Central Section (1982)
- Doctoral advisor: I. Howard Marshall

Craig L. Blomberg (born August 3, 1955) is an American New Testament scholar. As of 2025, he is the Distinguished Professor Emeritus of the New Testament at Denver Seminary in Colorado where he has been since 1986. As of 2025, he serves as the president of the Evangelical Theological Society.

== Education ==
In 1977, he graduated from Augustana College in Rock Island, Illinois, which is also his hometown.

== Personal life ==
Blomberg was born in a mainline Protestant family and was a member of the Lutheran Church in America. While he was in high school, he joined the Youth for Christ and became a born again Evangelical; as of 2025, he is a member of the Evangelical Covenant Church.

== Bibliography ==
- The Historical Reliability of John's Gospel: Issues and Commentary (IVP Academic, 2002) ISBN 9780830826858
- The Historical Reliability of the Gospels (IVP Academic, 2007) ISBN 9780830828074
- A New Testament Theology (Baylor University Press, 2018) ISBN 9781481302272
- Can We Still Believe in God?: Answering Ten Contemporary Challenges to Christianity (Brazos, 2020) ISBN 9781587434938
  - Théologie du Nouveau Testament (EXCELSIS, 2021) ISBN 9782755004144
- Jesus and the Gospels: An Introduction and Survey, Third Edition (B&H Academic, 2022) ISBN 9781087753140
- Jesus the Purifier: John's Gospel and the Fourth Quest for the Historical Jesus (Baker Academic, 2023) ISBN 9781540962959
