= Mounce =

Mounce is a surname, and may refer to:

- H. O. Mounce (born 1939), British philosopher
- Irene Mounce (1894–1987), Canadian mycologist
- Lewis Alfred Mounce (1857–1935), Canadian lumberman politician from British Columbia
- Robert H. Mounce (1921–2019), American biblical scholar, father of William D. Mounce
- Tony Mounce (born 1975), American baseball pitcher
- William D. Mounce (born 1953), American scholar of New Testament Greek, son of Robert H. Mounce
