= Reflecting God Study Bible =

Reflecting God Study Bible

The Reflecting God Study Bible is an out-of-print study Bible published by Zondervan in conjunction with the Christian Holiness Partnership, an ecumenical organization of denominations in the holiness movement. A Methodist revision of the NIV Study Bible, it utilizes the New International Version. Its general director, Dr. Wayne McCown, was assisted by 22 other contributors.

== See also ==
- The Wesley Study Bible, another Methodist study Bible
