= The Wesley Study Bible =

2009 text

- Genre: Religious text
- Publisher: Abingdon Press
- Publication date: 1 February 2009

The Wesley Study Bible is a Methodist-oriented biblical study text with introductory text for each book, explanations and commentary 'to help the reader to understand the biblical text', and with 'special references to the writings of John Wesley'.

== History ==
It was first published on 1 February 2009 by Abingdon Press. This initial release was a New Revised Standard Version edition of the Bible, without the Apocrypha books. In November 2012, The Wesley Study Bible was published in the Common English Bible (CEB) translation (also without the Apocrypha.) The CEB edition included National Geographic maps, a concordance, and an updated layout.

The Wesley Study Bible has comprehensive notes on the text written by over 50 Biblical scholars along with life application notes written by over 50 pastors. The General Editors of the Bible were William H. Willimon, United Methodist bishop of Birmingham, Alabama and Joel B. Green, professor of New Testament Interpretation at Fuller Theological Seminary. Associate Editors included Bill T. Arnold, Andy Johnson, Sarah Heaner Lancaster, Robert W. Wall, Laceye C. Warner, and Karen Strand Winslow.

The notes draw extensively on Wesleyan theology and specifically on the works of John Wesley, especially his Notes and his forty-four sermons. Wesleyan theological terms are explained. There are 19 pages of color maps in the back of the 1,616 page Bible (the CEB edition has 1728 pages).

Those who worked on the Bible were drawn from eleven churches based in North America with Wesleyan roots. They are The United Methodist Church, the African Methodist Episcopal Church, African Methodist Episcopal Zion Church, Christian and Missionary Alliance, Christian Methodist Episcopal Church, Church of the Nazarene, Church of God (Anderson, Indiana), Free Methodist Church of North America, The Salvation Army, Wesleyan Church, and the United Church of Canada.

A limited black genuine leather edition was published in October 2009 by HarperCollins Publishers and available only from Cokesbury.

A previous study Bible, now out of print, was the Wesley Bible published by Thomas Nelson, and using the New King James Version. This Bible was produced by those denominations aligned specifically with the Wesleyan-Holiness tradition.

== See also ==
- Reflecting God Study Bible

== Bibliography ==
- The CEB Wesley Study Bible (ISBN 9781609261108)
- The NRSV Wesley Study Bible (ISBN 9780687645039)
