= James Washington Watts =

American professor of religion

James W. Watts
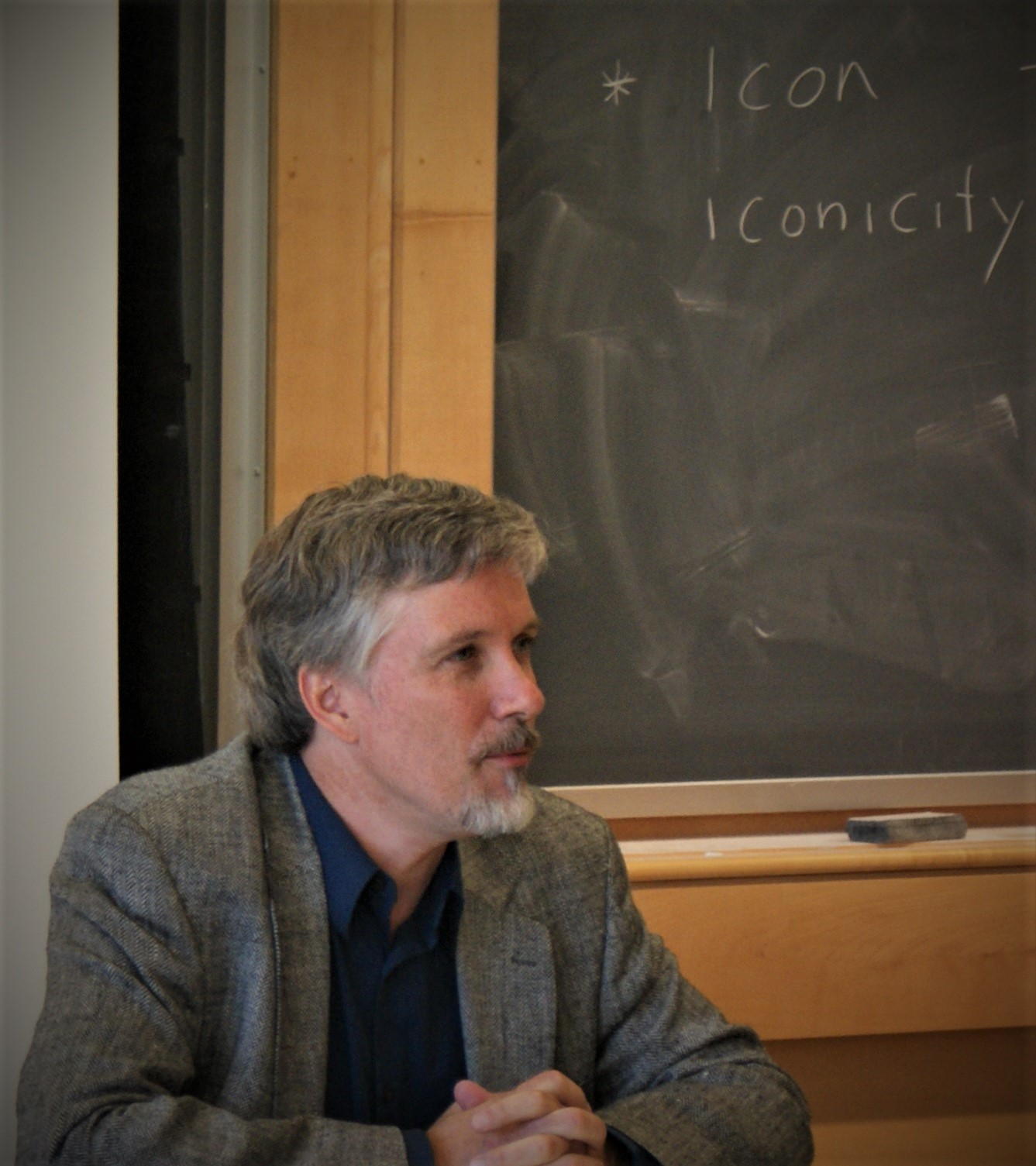
- James W. Watts in 2009
- Born: 1960 (age 65–66); Zűrich, Switzerland
- Occupation: Professor
- Parent(s): John D. W. Watts, Winifred Lee (Williams) Watts

James Washington Watts (born 24 August 1960) is an American professor of religion at Syracuse University. His research focuses on the rhetoric of Leviticus. His publications also compare the Bible with other religious scriptures, especially in their ritual performances, social functions, and material symbolism.

== Biography ==
James W. Watts is a U.S. citizen born in Switzerland where his father, John D. W. Watts, was teaching at the International Baptist Theological Seminary in Rüschlikon. He left there with his family in 1970 for Louisville, Kentucky. They spent three years in India where he attended Woodstock School, before finishing High School in South Pasadena, California.

Watts earned his B.A. in philosophy from Pomona College (1982) where he studied with Frederick Sontag, briefly with Masao Abe and, during a term at Oxford University, with Stephanie Dalley. He then earned his M.Div. and M.T.S. in New Testament from Southern Seminary in Louisville, Kentucky (1985, 1986), and his Ph.D. in Hebrew Bible/Old Testament from Yale University in New Haven, Connecticut (1990) where he studied with Robert R. Wilson, Brevard S. Childs, and Mark S. Smith.

He taught on the faculty of Hastings College in Hastings, Nebraska (1993–1999) and then joined the Department of Religion of Syracuse University in Syracuse, New York (1999- ), where he served as department chair from 2009 to 2015.

== Academic work ==
James W. Watts has advocated a rhetorical approach to analyzing the contents and influence of biblical literature. He applied this method to the Pentateuch (1999) and especially to the book of Leviticus (2007, 2013a, 2023). Watts argued that the ritual rhetoric of Leviticus empowered the temple priests of Jerusalem and Samaria, who in turn ritualized the Torah/Pentateuch containing Leviticus as Judaism's first, and most important, scripture.

Watts also drew attention to "iconic books"—written texts that are revered primarily as objects of power or influential symbols rather than just as words of instruction, information, or insight. In 2001, he and Dorina Miller Parmenter founded the Iconic Books Project at Syracuse University (Watts 2013b). In 2010, together with S. Brent Plate, they founded the Society for Comparative Research in Iconic and Performative Texts (SCRIPT).

Watts (2013b, 2019) has advocated a three-dimensional model for understanding how religious communities ritualize their scriptures and other sacred texts: in the iconic dimension of the text's visual appearance, material form, and physical manipulation; in the expressive (or performative) dimension of the text's expression in oral words and mental thoughts, as well as in song, visual art, theater and film; and in the semantic dimension of the text's interpretation in preaching, commentary, and ritualized study.

Watts brought these two research programs together into a religious studies approach to biblical studies. He argued that ritualizing first the Torah/Pentateuch (2017) and then biblical literature generally (2021a) in these three dimensions generated their status as scripture. Their continuing ritualization by Jews and Christians in all three dimensions reinforces their scriptural status.

== Published books ==
- 1992: Psalm and Story: Inset Hymns in Hebrew Narrative. Journal for the Study of the Old Testament Supplement Series 139. Sheffield: JSOT Press, 1992. ISBN 9780567564108 (Revision of the author's Ph.D. dissertation, Yale University, 1990, titled "Psalms in narrative contexts of the Hebrew Bible.")
- 1996: (Co-editor with Paul R. House) Forming Prophetic Literature: Essays on Isaiah and the Twelve in Honor of John D. W. Watts. Journal for the study of the Old Testament Supplement Series 235. Sheffield Academic Press, 1996. ISBN 9781850756415
- 1999: Reading Law: The Rhetorical Shaping of the Pentateuch. Biblical Seminar 59. Sheffield Academic Press, 1999. ISBN 9781850759973
- 2001: (Editor) Persia and Torah: The Theory of Imperial Authorization of the Pentateuch. Symposium Series. Society of Biblical Literature, 2001. ISBN 9781589830158
- 2001: (Co-editor with Stephen L. Cook and Corrine L. Patton) The Whirlwind: Essays on Job, Hermeneutics and Theology in Memory of Jane Morse. Journal for the study of the Old Testament Supplement Series 336. Sheffield Academic Press, 2001. ISBN 9780567374844
- 2007: Ritual and Rhetoric in Leviticus: From Sacrifice to Scripture. Cambridge University Press, 2007. ISBN 9781107407954
- 2013a: Leviticus 1-10, Historical Commentary on the Old Testament. Leuven: Peeters, 2013. ISBN 9789042929845
- 2013b: (Editor) Iconic Books and Texts. Sheffield: Equinox, 2013. ISBN 9781845539856
- 2017: Understanding the Pentateuch as A Scripture. Oxford: Wiley Blackwell, 2017. ISBN 9781405196390
- 2018: (Editor) Sensing Sacred Texts. Sheffield: Equinox, 2018. ISBN 9781781797426
- 2019: How and Why Books Matter: Essays on the Social Function of Iconic Texts. Sheffield: Equinox, 2019. ISBN 9781781797693
- 2021a: Understanding the Bible as A Scripture in History, Culture, and Religion. Oxford: Wiley Blackwell, 2021. ISBN 9781119730378
- 2021b: (Co-author with Yohan Yoo) Cosmologies of Pure Realms and the Rhetoric of Pollution. New York: Routledge, 2021. ISBN 9780367712051
- 2021c: (Co-editor with Yohan Yoo) Books as Bodies and as Sacred Beings. Sheffield: Equinox, 2021. ISBN 9781781798843
- 2023: Leviticus 11-20, Historical Commentary on the Old Testament. Leuven: Peeters, 2023. ISBN 9789042949720
