= New International Commentary on the Old Testament =

Series of commentaries

The New International Commentary on the Old Testament is a series of commentaries in English on the text of the Old Testament in Hebrew. It is published by the William B. Eerdmans Publishing Company. The series editors are Robert L. Hubbard, Jr. and Bill T. Arnold.

The NICOT covers all 39 books of the Old Testament with the exceptions of Exodus, 1 & 2 Kings, 1 & 2 Chronicles, and Esther.

== Volumes ==
- Hamilton, Victor P. (1990). The Book of Genesis: Chapters 1-17. ISBN 0802825214.
- Hamilton, Victor P. (1995). The Book of Genesis: Chapters 18-50. ISBN 0802823092.
- Wenham, Gordon J. (1979). The Book of Leviticus. ISBN 0802825222.
- Ashley, Timothy R. (1993). The Book of Numbers. ISBN 0802825230.
- Arnold, Bill T. (2022). The Book of Deuteronomy, Chapters 1-11. ISBN 978-0-8028-2170-6.
- Arnold, Bill T. The Book of Deuteronomy, Chapters 12-30. (projected future volume)
  - replaced Craigie, Peter C. (1976). The Book of Deuteronomy. ISBN 0802825249.
- Woudstra, Marten H. (1981). The Book of Joshua. ISBN 0802825257.
- Webb, Barry G. (2012). The Book of Judges. ISBN 978-0802826282.
- Lau, Peter H. W. (2023). The Book of Ruth. ISBN 978-0-8028-7726-0.
  - Replaced Hubbard, Robert L. (1988). The Book of Ruth. ISBN 0802825265.
- Tsumura, David Toshio (2007). The First Book of Samuel. ISBN 978-0802823595.
- Tsumura, David Toshio (2019). The Second Book of Samuel. ISBN 978-0802870964.
- Harrington, Hannah K. (2022). The Books of Ezra and Nehemiah. ISBN 978-0802825483.
  - Replaced Fensham, F. Charles (1982). The Books of Ezra and Nehemiah. ISBN 0802825273.
- Hartley, John E. (1988). The Book of Job. ISBN 0802825281.
- DeClaisse-Walford, Nancy L.; Jacobson, Rolf; Tanner, Beth (2014). The Book of Psalms. ISBN 978-0802824936.
- Waltke, Bruce K. (2004). The Book of Proverbs: Chapters 1-15. ISBN 0802825451.
- Waltke, Bruce K. (2005). The Book of Proverbs: Chapters 15-31. 0802827764.
- Longman III, Tremper (1998). The Book of Ecclesiastes. ISBN 0802823661.
- Longman III, Tremper (2001). Song of Songs. ISBN 0802825435.
- Oswalt, John N. (1986). The Book of Isaiah, Chapters 1-39. ISBN 080282529X.
- Oswalt, John N. (1998). The Book of Isaiah: Chapters 40-66. ISBN 0802825346.
- Goldingay, John (2021). The Book of Jeremiah. ISBN 978-0-8028-7584-6.
  - Replaced Thompson, J. A. (1980). The Book of Jeremiah. ISBN 0802825303.
- Goldingay, John (2022). The Book of Lamentations. ISBN 978-0-8028-2542-1.
- Block, Daniel I. (1997). The Book of Ezekiel: Chapters 1-24. ISBN 0802825354.
- Block, Daniel I. (1998). The Book of Ezekiel: Chapters 25-48. ISBN 0802825362.
- Dearman, John Andrew (2010). The Book of Hosea. ISBN 978-0802825391.
- Nogalski, James D. (2023). The Books of Joel, Obadiah, and Jonah. ISBN 978-0-8028-6427-7.
  - Replaced Allen, Leslie C. (1976). The Books of Joel, Obadiah, Jonah and Micah. ISBN 0802825311.
- Nogalski, James D. (2024). The Book of Micah. ISBN 9780802882646.
  - Replaced Allen, Leslie C. (1976). The Books of Joel, Obadiah, Jonah and Micah. ISBN 0802825311.
- Carroll R., M. Daniel (2020). The Book of Amos. ISBN 978-0-8028-2538-4.
- Renz, Thomas (2021). The Books of Nahum, Habakkuk, and Zephaniah. ISBN 978-0-8028-2626-8.
  - Replaced Robertson, O. Palmer (1990). The Books of Nahum, Habakkuk, and Zephaniah. ISBN 080282532X.
- Boda, Mark J. (2016). The Book of Zechariah. ISBN 978-0-8028-2375-5.
- Jacobs, Mignon R. (2018). The Books of Haggai and Malachi. ISBN 978-0802826251.
  - Replaced Verhoef, Pieter A. (1987). The Books of Haggai and Malachi. ISBN 978-0-8028-2533-9.

== Physical Parameters ==
The original hardcover editions published during the 1970s through 1990 were characterized by a distinctive dark gray cloth binding with a scarlet field and gold lettering on the spine, and the individual volumes were approximately 5.675 inches (14.41 cm) in width, 8.75 inches (22.2 cm) in height, and of variable thickness. Beginning in c. 1993, the hardback editions (including revised and/or second editions) have been characterized by a light-tan cloth binding with dark blue lettering on the spine, and the individual volumes are approximately 6.25 inches (15.9 cm) in width, 9.5 inches (24 cm) in height, and of variable thickness.

== Reception ==
Christianity Today magazine included the series in a list of the more significant publications and achievements of Evangelicalism in the latter half of the 20th century.

== See also ==
- New International Commentary on the New Testament
- Book series
- Exegesis
- Textual criticism
