= Marten Woudstra =

Dutch-American pastor, theologian, and academic (1922–1991)

Marten Hendrik Woudstra (July 23, 1922 – October 3, 1991) was a Dutch-born evangelical theologian, biblical scholar, seminary professor, and minister of the Christian Reformed Church. He served as president of the Evangelical Theological Society and as chairman of the Old Testament committee for the translation of the New International Version of the Bible. Woudstra's most notable contribution to evangelical scholarship is the publication of his commentary on the Book of Joshua in the New International Commentary on the Old Testament.

== Early life and education ==
Woudstra was born July 23, 1922, in a Catholic family in Burgum, the Netherlands (then officially called Bergum). After graduating from a Reformed Gymnasium, he attended the Reformed Theological Seminary in Kampen from 1942 to 1946. He emigrated to the United States, earned his B.D. (1948) and then Th.M. (1949) from Westminster Theological Seminary outside Philadelphia, Pennsylvania. Woudstra then studied at the Dropsie College for Hebrew and Cognate Learning (1951–52), and, after his ordination discussed below, at the Free University of Amsterdam (1955).

While studying at the Westminster Theological Seminary, Woudstra also taught at the Reformed Episcopal Seminary which at that time was located in Philadelphia, Pennsylvania. In 1961, Woudstra became the first person to receive a Doctor of Theology degree from the Westminster Theological Seminary. He later studied at the University of Hamburg (1969–70).

== Career ==
In 1953, the Christian Reformed Church ordained Woudstra as a minister. He served as pastor of the Third Christian Reformed Church in Edmonton, Alberta for two years. During this time, Woudstra also edited The Presbyterian Guardian, a journal published by the Orthodox Presbyterian Church. From 1955 until his retirement in 1985, Woudstra served as professor of Hebrew and Old Testament exegesis at Calvin Theological Seminary in Grand Rapids, Michigan.

In 1957, Woudstra, along with Henry Schultze, Ralph Stob, and Martin Wyngaarden, formed a committee to consider producing a "faithful translation of the Scriptures in the common language of the American people." In 1962, this committee joined representatives from National Association of Evangelicals to constitute the "Joint Committee on Bible Translation", of which Woudstra was named chairperson. As the effort gained momentum, Woudstra and Wyngaarden remained key members of what became the Committee on Bible Translation (Schultze and Stob having died before the official launching of the translation effort in 1965). Wyngaarden was replaced by John Stek in 1962, but Woudstra continued to serve as a permanent member of the committee, eventually being appointed chair of the Old Testament committee, until the publication of the complete New International Version of the Bible in 1978. The following year he was elected to serve a term as president of the Evangelical Theological Society. Woudstra died October 3, 1991, in Kentwood, Michigan.

== Publications ==
- Calvin's Dying Bequest to the Church: A Critical Evaluation of the Commentary on Joshua (1960) Volume 1 of Calvin Theological Seminary monograph series
- The Continued Recognition of the Old Testament as Part of the Christian Canon (1963) Inaugural address to Calvin Seminary Chapel
- The Religious Problem-Complex of Prophet and Priest in Contemporary Thought (1965)
- The Ark of the Covenant from Conquest to Kingship (1965) Doctoral thesis
- The Book of Joshua in the New International Commentary on the Old Testament (1981) Wm. B. Eerdmans Publishing ISBN 0802825257
- “Zechariah.” In Job–Malachi, edited by Carl F. H. Henry, 2:371–378. The Biblical Expositor. A. J. Holman Company, 1960.
