= Ralph W. Klein =

American Old Testament scholar (1936–2021)

Ralph Walter Klein (1936 – December 29, 2021) was an American Old Testament scholar. He was Christ Seminary-Seminex Professor Emeritus of Old Testament at the Lutheran School of Theology at Chicago.

Klein was born in Springfield, Illinois, and studied at Concordia College in Wisconsin, Concordia Senior College, Concordia Seminary, and Harvard Divinity School. He was ordained as a pastor in the Lutheran Church–Missouri Synod in 1966, and taught at Concordia Senior College and Concordia Seminary. After a period as a pastor in St. Louis, Klein taught at Christ Seminary-Seminex before moving to the Lutheran School of Theology at Chicago (LSTC) in 1983. He served as dean at LSTC from 1988 to 1999.

Klein wrote commentaries on 1 Samuel (WBC), 1 Chronicles, and 2 Chronicles. He was editor of Currents in Theology and Mission from 1974 to 2009.

In 2003, a Festschrift was published in his honor. The Chronicler as Theologian: Essays in Honor of Ralph W. Klein included contributions from Robert H. Smith, Gary N. Knoppers and Leslie C. Allen. Klein died on December 29, 2021, at the age of 85.
