= Life Application Study Bible =

Study Bible

Life Application Study Bible (Second Edition), NLT

The Life Application Study Bible is a study Bible published by both Tyndale House and Zondervan Publishers. It features extensive notes, book introductions, character studies, articles, commentary, maps and charts. It is available in multiple translations, in both English and Spanish (Biblia de estudio del diario vivir), and is advertised as "today's number one selling study Bible".

== Contents and background ==
The book's aim is to enable readers to grasp the meaning of Bible passages so that they can put their principles into practice. Roughly 33% of the book features "extrabiblical, supplementary content". It features summaries, diagrams, annotations on passages, contemplative articles, charts, and sidebars on key topics. The book contains biblical figures' life stories, highlighting the actionable insights drawn from their lives. The book's back cover says, "How many times have you read your Bible and asked: 'How can this possibly apply to my life, my job, my friendships, my marriage, my neighborhood, my family, my country? ... Why can't I understand what God is saying to me through His Word?"

Student's Life Application Bible is a student version of the book. It features "slice of life" stories provided by teenagers and abridged annotations. The scholar Timothy Beal said that in the market for study Bibles, the NIV Study Bible is the Life Application Study Bible's primary rival.

== Reception ==
Tony Baxter of Evangel said the Life Application Study Bible has "some of the most helpful notes around and are of great value to preachers in helping them to actually apply the Bible to people today, rather than just talking about the Bible". The Toronto Star writer Barry Henaut lauded the student version of the book, Student's Life Application Bible, saying the abridged annotations "really hit their target audience", "the layout and design are A-1", and "this is easily the best teen Bible reviewed".

== Available English editions ==
- New Living Translation
- New International Version
- King James Version
- New King James Version

== Available Spanish editions ==
- Nueva Traducción Viviente
- Reina-Valera (1960 revision)

== Past editions ==
- The Living Bible
- New Revised Standard Version
- New American Standard Bible
- Holman Christian Standard Bible
