= The King James Study Bible =

The King James Study Bible is a study edition of the King James Bible originally produced by Liberty University and first published in 1988. It has undergone several name changes and is sold by Christian publishing house Thomas Nelson in a mass-market edition. As of 2018, it has sold over two million copies. The theology in the study notes reflect conservative Christian theology.
