= Nancy L. deClaisse-Walford =

Nancy L. deClaissé-Walford
- Born: December 21, 1954 (age 71)
- Occupations: theologian, specialist in the Hebrew language and Biblical studies
- Title: Carolyn Ward Professor of Old Testament and Biblical Languages
- Spouse: Steve deClaissé-Walford
- Children: 2

Academic background
- Education: California St. Univ., Northridge (1976, B.A. Ancient History); Fuller Theological Seminary (1985, M.A. Semitic Languages & Literature
- Alma mater: Baylor University (Ph.D.)
- Thesis: (1995)

Academic work
- Discipline: Biblical studies
- Sub-discipline: Old Testament and Hebrew studies
- Institutions: George W. Truett Theological Seminary; James and Carolyn McAfee School of theology, Mercer University
- Notable works: The Book of Psalms (NICOT)
- Website: theology.mercer.edu/faculty-and-staff/declaisse-walford/

Nancy L. deClaissé-Walford (born December 21, 1954) (PhD, Baylor University) is an American theologian, specialist in the Hebrew language and Biblical studies. She is Carolyn Ward Professor of Old Testament and Biblical Languages and Advisor for the Academic Research Track at McAfee School of Theology, Mercer University, Atlanta.

She was awarded a Ph.D. 1995, Baylor University, M.A. 1985, Fuller Theological Seminary, B.A. Ancient History 1976, California State University, Northridge.

Also acts as the Word Biblical Commentary series Old Testament editor and has served for 20 years on the editorial board for the Review & Expositor journal. She is known for her work and commentaries on Psalms, where she advocates feminist critical reading of the Psalter.

== Works ==
=== Books ===
- deClaisse-Walford, Nancy L. (1997). Reading from the beginning : the shaping of the Hebrew Psalter. Mercer University Press. ISBN 978-0-865-54567-0.
- ——— (2002). Biblical Hebrew: an introductory textbook. Chalice Press. ISBN 978-0-827-20231-3.
- ——— (2014). The Book of Psalms. NICOT. Grand Rapids, MI: Eerdmans. ISBN 978-0-802-82493-6.
- ——— (2004). Introduction to the Psalms: a song from ancient Israel. Christian Board of Publication. ISBN 978-0-827-21623-5.
- ———, ed. (2014). The Shape and Shaping of the Book of Psalms: the current state of scholarship. Ancient Israel and Its Literature. SBL Press. ISBN 978-1-628-37001-0.
- deClaisse-Walford, Nancy L. (2020). Psalms : Books 4-5. Wisdom Commentary. Vol. 22. Collegeville, MN: Liturgical Press. ISBN 978-0-814-68121-3.
