= Mark J. Boda =

Canadian Old Testament scholar and theologian (born 1962)

- Born: 15 June 1962 (age 64)
- Occupation: Professor of Old Testament
- Years active: 1994–present

Academic background
- Education: Canadian Bible College (1984); Westminster Theological Seminary (1991); University of Cambridge (1996)
- Thesis: "Praying the Tradition: The Origin and Use of Tradition in Nehemiah 9" (1995)
- Doctoral advisors: Graham I. Davies, Hugh G. M. Williamson

Academic work
- Discipline: Biblical Studies
- Sub-discipline: Old Testament; Biblical Theology
- Institutions: Ambrose University (Note: Formerly known as Canadian Bible College and Theological Seminary and located in Regina, Saskatchewan) (1994–2003); McMaster Divinity College (2003–present)

Mark J. Boda (born June 15, 1962) is a Canadian academic and Old Testament scholar, specializing in the literature and theology of the Old Testament.

== Life and career ==
Boda was born on June 15, 1962. He completed undergraduate studies at Canadian Bible College in Regina, Saskatchewan (BTh) and a master's degree at Westminster Theological Seminary in Glenside, Pennsylvania (MDiv). Boda earned his doctoral degree (PhD) at the University of Cambridge in 1996, writing his dissertation under the supervision of Graham I. Davies and Hugh G. M. Williamson.

Boda began his teaching career in 1994 back at his alma mater, Canadian Bible College and Theological Seminary, where he was Assistant and Associate Professor of Biblical Studies and Old Testament (1994–2001), then Professor of Old Testament Literature (2001–2003). Since 2003, he has been Professor and Chair in Old Testament at McMaster Divinity College in Hamilton, Ontario. In 2026, he was appointed the Margaret and Stanley Ford Chair of Old Testament at McMaster Divinity College.

In addition to his academic work, Boda also has ministry experience within the Christian & Missionary Alliance, having served in various pastoral roles in both Canada and the United States.

== Academic work ==
The primary areas of focus within Boda's scholarship include Old Testament theology, prayer and penitence in the Old Testament and Christian theology, Babylonian and Persian period history and texts in the Hebrew Bible, and Hebrew poetry. His work has focused especially on the following Old Testament books: Ezra-Nehemiah, Chronicles, Haggai, Zechariah, Judges, Psalms, and Lamentations.

Boda served as president of the Canadian Society of Biblical Studies in 2013–2014 and was the program secretary for the Institute for Biblical Research from 2012 to 2018. Additionally, he has been on the Committee for Bible Translation, the group responsible for the New International Version (NIV), since 2016.

== Publishing activities ==
Boda has maintained a steady research and publication output throughout his career. As of 2024, he has authored 8 monographs and 5 biblical commentaries, 25 articles in academic journals and periodicals, more than 60 chapters in edited volumes, and numerous articles or entries in dictionaries and reference works. In addition, he has served as the editor or co-editor of over 20 volumes, and has extensive experience as a member of the editorial board for several book series, journals, and publishers. Currently, he is the series co-editor of the Baker Commentary on the Old Testament: Prophets (Baker Academic) and an associate editor of the Story of God Bible Commentary series (Zondervan).

== Selected publications ==
=== Authored books and monographs ===
- Boda, Mark J. (1999). Praying the Tradition: The Origin and Use of Tradition in Nehemiah 9. Beihefte zur Zeitschrift für die alttestamentliche Wissenschaft. Vol. 277. Berlin: de Gruyter.
- ——— (2003). Haggai and Zechariah Research: A Bibliographic Survey. Tools for Biblical Studies. Vol. 5. Leiden: Deo.
- ——— (2007). After God's Own Heart: The Gospel According to David. The Gospel According to the Old Testament. Phillipsburg, NJ: P&R Publishing.
- ——— (2009). A Severe Mercy: Sin and Its Remedy in the Old Testament. Siphrut. Vol. 1. Winona Lake, IN: Eisenbrauns.
- ——— (2015). "Return to Me": A Biblical Theology of Repentance. New Studies in Biblical Theology. Vol. 35. Downers Grove, IL: InterVarsity Press.
- ——— (2017). Exploring Zechariah, Volume 1: The Development of Zechariah and Its Role within the Twelve (PDF). Ancient Near East Monographs. Vol. 16. Atlanta: SBL Press.(from the Official SBL website)
- ——— (2017). Exploring Zechariah, Volume 2: The Development and Role of Biblical Traditions in Zechariah (PDF). Ancient Near East Monographs. Vol. 17. Atlanta: SBL Press. Archived from the original on 1 April 2025. (from the Official SBL website)
- ——— (2017). The Heartbeat of Old Testament Theology: Three Creedal Expressions. Acadia Studies in Bible and Theology. Grand Rapids: Baker Academic.

=== Biblical Commentaries ===
- Boda, Mark J. (2004). Haggai, Zechariah. NIV Application Commentary. Grand Rapids: Zondervan.
- ——— (2010). 1–2 Chronicles. Cornerstone Biblical Commentary. Vol. 5a. Carol Stream, IL: Tyndale House.
- ——— (2012). "Judges". In Longman III, Tremper; Garland, David E. (eds.). Numbers–Ruth. The Expositor’s Bible Commentary. Vol. 2 (rev. ed.). Grand Rapids: Zondervan. pp. 1043–1288.
- ——— (2016). The Book of Zechariah. New International Commentary on the Old Testament. Grand Rapids: Eerdmans.
- ———; Conway, Mary L. (2022). Judges. Zondervan Exegetical Commentary on the Old Testament. Grand Rapids: Zondervan Academic.
- ——— (2026). Lamentations. Baker Commentary on the Old Testament: Prophetic Books. Grand Rapids: Baker Academic.

=== Edited volumes ===
- Boda, Mark J.; Michael H. Floyd, eds. (2003). Bringing Out the Treasure: Inner Biblical Allusion in Zechariah 9–14. Journal for the Study of the Old Testament Supplement Series. Vol. 370. Sheffield: Sheffield Academic.
- Boda, Mark J.; Daniel K. Falk; Rodney A. Werline, eds. (2006–2008). Seeking the Favor of God. Early Judaism and Its Literature. Vol. 21–23. Atlanta: Society of Biblical Literature.
- Boda, Mark J.; Gordon T. Smith, eds. (2006). Repentance in Christian Theology. Collegeville, MN: Liturgical Press.
- Boda, Mark J.; Michael H. Floyd, eds. (2008). Tradition in Transition: Haggai and Zechariah 1–8 in the Trajectory of Hebrew Theology. Library of Hebrew Bible/Old Testament Studies. Vol. 475. New York: T&T Clark.
- Boda, Mark J.; Paul L. Redditt, eds. (2008). Unity and Disunity in Ezra-Nehemiah: Redaction, Rhetoric, and Reader. Hebrew Bible Monographs. Vol. 17. Sheffield: Sheffield Phoenix.
- Boda, Mark J.; Stanley E. Porter, eds. (2009). Translating the New Testament: Text, Translation, Theology. McMaster New Testament Studies. Grand Rapids: Eerdmans.
- Boda, Mark J.; Jamie R. Novotny, eds. (2010). From the Foundations to the Crenellations: Essays on Temple Building in the Ancient Near East and Hebrew Bible. Alter Orient und Altes Testament. Vol. 366. Münster: Ugarit-Verlag.
- Boda, Mark J.; Carol J. Dempsey; LeAnn Snow Flesher, eds. (2012). Daughter Zion: Her Portrait, Her Response. Ancient Israel and Its Literature. Vol. 13. Atlanta: Society of Biblical Literature.
- Boda, Mark J.; J. Gordon McConville, eds. (2012). Dictionary of the Old Testament: Prophets. Downers Grove, IL: IVP Academic.
- Boda, Mark J.; Iain Provan, eds. (2012). Let Us Go up to Zion: Essays in Honour of H. G. M. Williamson on the Occasion of His Sixty-Fifth Birthday. Supplements to Vetus Testamentum. Vol. 153. Leiden: Brill.
- Boda, Mark J.; Lissa M. Wray Beal, eds. (2013). Prophets, Prophecy, and Ancient Israelite Historiography. Winona Lake, IN: Eisenbrauns.
- Boda, Mark J.; Tremper Longman III; Cristian G. Rata, eds. (2013). The Words of the Wise Are Like Goads: Engaging Qoheleth in the Twenty-First Century. Winona Lake, IN: Eisenbrauns.
- Boda, Mark J.; Carol J. Dempsey; LeAnn Snow Flesher, eds. (2014). Why? ... How Long? Studies on Voice(s) of Lamentation Rooted in Biblical Hebrew Poetry. Library of Hebrew Bible/Old Testament Studies. Vol. 552. New York: Bloomsbury T&T Clark.
- Boda, Mark J.; Michael H. Floyd; Colin M. Toffelmire, eds. (2015). The Book of the Twelve and the New Form Criticism. Ancient Near East Monographs. Vol. 10. Atlanta: SBL Press.
- Boda, Mark J.; Frank Ritchel Ames; John J. Ahn; Mark Leuchter, eds. (2015). The Prophets Speak on Forced Migration. Ancient Israel and Its Literature. Vol. 21. Atlanta: SBL Press.
- Boda, Mark J.; Russell L. Meek; William R. Osborne, eds. (2018). Riddles and Revelations: Explorations into the Relationship Between Wisdom and Prophecy in the Hebrew Bible. Library of Hebrew Bible/Old Testament Studies. Vol. 634. London: T&T Clark.
- Boda, Mark J.; Kevin Chau; Beth LaNeel Tanner, eds. (2019). Inner-Biblical Allusion in the Poetry of Wisdom and Psalms. Library of Hebrew Bible/Old Testament Studies. Vol. 659. London: T&T Clark.
- Boda, Mark J.; Dalit Rom-Shiloni, eds. (2023). Crossing Borders Between the Domestic and the Wild: Space, Fauna, and Flora. DNI Bible Supplements. Vol. 1. London: T&T Clark.
