= John N. Oswalt =

American scholar and professor

- Born: John Newell Oswalt; June 21, 1940 (age 86); Mansfield, Ohio
- Occupation: Visiting Distinguished Professor of Old Testament at Asbury Theological Seminary Asbury Theological Seminary
- Spouse: Karen (nee Kennedy)
- Children: Elizabeth, Andrew, Peter

Academic background
- Education: Taylor University, Asbury Theological Seminary
- Alma mater: Brandeis University (Ph.D.)

Academic work
- Discipline: Biblical studies
- Sub-discipline: Old Testament studies
- Institutions: Barrington College; Wesley Biblical Seminary; Asbury University; Trinity Evangelical Divinity School
- Main interests: Old Testament studies Hebrew language Hebrew religion
- Notable works: The Book of Isaiah (NICOT)
- Website: http://asburyseminary.edu/person/dr-john-oswalt/

John N. Oswalt is an American Wesleyan scholar and distinguished professor of Old Testament at Asbury Theological Seminary. He teaches in theology, Old Testament and ancient Semitic languages including Hebrew. Oswalt adheres to single, unitary authorship of the Book of Isaiah.

== Biography ==
=== Education ===
Oswalt earned his B.A. at Taylor University. He further earned a B.D. and Th.M. from Asbury Theological Seminary and a M.A. and Ph.D. from Brandeis University.

=== Career ===
Oswalt is an ordained minister in the United Methodist Church. He was president of Asbury College from 1983 to 1986. He is a Wesleyan scholar and distinguished professor of Old Testament at Asbury Theological Seminary. He teaches in theology, Old Testament and ancient Semitic languages including Hebrew.

== Scholarly contribution ==
=== Isaiah ===
Oswalt is the author a notable 2-volume commentary on the Book of Isaiah in the New International Commentary on the Old Testament series. Most scholars believe that Isaiah had multiple authors, which Oswalt disputes. He argued that the source of all the chapters in the book of Isaiah are from Isaiah, though the book could have been assembled over the years from his collected works. He wrote that in the Dead Sea Scrolls, Isaiah is a single scroll with no signs of change between chapters 39 and 40. Also as far as we know the book has always existed in one collection called "Isaiah".

=== Theology ===
Oswalt holds Wesleyan soteriological views. He is the editor of a Wesleyan systematic theology.

== Selected works ==
Oswalt's books and articles include:

=== Books ===
- Oswalt, John N. (1987). The Leisure Crisis. Critical Issues Series. Wheaton, IL: Victor Books. ISBN 978-0-896-93241-8. OCLC 16758431.
- ——— (1996). The Book of Isaiah: Chapters 1-39. NICOT. Grand Rapids, MI: Eerdmans. ISBN 978-0-802-82368-7. OCLC 13455281.
- ——— (1998). The Book of Isaiah: Chapters 40-66. NICOT. Grand Rapids, MI: Eerdmans. ISBN 978-0-802-82534-6.
- ——— (1999). Called to be Holy: A Biblical Perspective. Nappanee, IN: Evangel Publishing House. ISBN 978-0-916-03592-1. OCLC 42896075.
- ——— (1999). Where are you God?: Malachi's Perspectives on Injustice and Suffering. Nappanee, IN: Evangel Publishing House. ISBN 978-0-882-07353-8. OCLC 8617973.
- ——— (2003). Isaiah: from biblical text - to contemporary life. NIV Application Commentary. Grand Rapids, MI: Zondervan. ISBN 978-0-310-20613-2. OCLC 51752410.
- ——— (2008). On Being a Christian: thoughts from John the Apostle. Wilmore, KY: Francis Asbury Press. ISBN 978-0-915-14312-2. OCLC 423081670.
- ——— (2009). The Bible Among the Myths: unique revelation or just ancient literature?. Grand Rapids, MI: Zondervan. ISBN 978-0-310-28509-0. OCLC 567246117.
- ———; Kinlaw, Dennis F. (2011). Lectures in Old Testament Theology. Anderson, IN: Francis Asbury Press. ISBN 978-1-593-17542-9.
- ——— (2013). Exodus: The Way Out. Blaize Studies Series. Anderson, IN: Francis Asbury Press. ISBN 9781593176525. OCLC 904963726.
- ——— (2014). The Holy One of Israel: Studies in the Book of Isaiah. Cambridge: James Clarke & Co. ISBN 978-1-597-52659-3.

=== Edited by ===
- Oswalt, John N., ed. (2024). Holy Love: A Wesleyan Systematic Theology. Vol. 1. Wilmore, KY: Francis Asbury Press.
- ———, ed. (2024). Holy Love: A Wesleyan Systematic Theology. Vol. 2. Wilmore, KY: Francis Asbury Press.
- ———, ed. (2026). Holy Love: A Wesleyan Systematic Theology. Vol. 3. Wilmore, KY: Francis Asbury Press.

=== Articles ===
- ——— (January 1973). "The Golden Calves and the Egyptian Concept of Deity". The Evangelical Quarterly. 45 (1): 13–20. doi:10.1163/27725472-04501005. S2CID 251877791.
- ——— (1977). "The Myth of the Dragon and Old Testament Faith". The Evangelical Quarterly. 49 (3): 163–172. doi:10.1163/27725472-04903004. S2CID 194121749.
