= C. J. Ball =

English academic and clergyman

Charles James Ball (born Charles Jabez Ball; 3 March 1851 - 7 February 1924) was an English academic and clergyman. He was a classical and Hebrew master at Merchant Taylors' School, chaplain of Lincoln's Inn, some time reader of Assyriology in the University of Oxford, and rector of St. Giles Church in Bletchington, a village 8 miles (13 km) north of Oxford.

== Writings ==
As a biblical commentator, he wrote "The Prophecies of Jeremiah with a Sketch of his Life and Times" (1890) for the Expositor's Bible series, and for the Speaker's Commentary, and contributed the volumes on 2 Kings and 1 and 2 Chronicles in Charles Ellicott's commentary series. Ball was also considered a "recognised authorit[y] in Assyriology", with published notes on the Nin-Mag' Inscription and Inscriptions of Nebuchadrezzar the Great.

Ball notes, and considers plausible, the possibility that the prophet Jeremiah wrote the Book of Job "as some suppose", and suggests that Psalm 71, "which seems to be from his pen, and which wants the usual heading 'A Psalm of David'", could also have been written by Jeremiah.

Ball also translated volume one (Genesis) of Hermann Hugo Paul Haupt's Polychrome Bible.
