= New International Version =

English translation of the Bible

- Abbreviation: NIV
- NT published: 1973
- Complete Bible published: October 27, 1978
- Textual basis: OT: Biblia Hebraica Stuttgartensia (5th ed., 1997); additional sources; NT: UBS Greek New Testament (4th corrected ed.); Novum Testamentum Graece (27th ed., 1993)
- Translation type: Dynamic equivalence
- Reading level: 7.8
- Version revision: 1984, 2011
- Publisher: Biblica (Note: The NIV is published by Zondervan in the United States, and Hodder & Stoughton in the United Kingdom.)
- Copyright: The Holy Bible, New International Version, NIV Copyright 1973, 1978, 1984, 2011 by Biblica, Inc. Used by permission. All rights reserved worldwide.
- Copies printed: 500,000,000
- Religious affiliation: Evangelical
- Website: www.thenivbible.com
- Genesis 1:1–3 In the beginning God created the heavens and the earth. Now the earth was formless and empty, darkness was over the surface of the deep, and the Spirit of God was hovering over the waters. And God said, "Let there be light," and there was light. John 3:16 For God so loved the world that he gave his one and only Son, that whoever believes in him shall not perish but have eternal life.

The New International Version (NIV) is a translation of the Bible into contemporary English. Published by Biblica, the complete NIV was released on October 27, 1978, with a minor revision in 1984 and a major revision in 2011. The NIV relies on recently published critical editions of the original Hebrew, Aramaic, and Greek texts.

Biblica claims that "the NIV delivers the very best combination of accuracy and readability." Over 450 million printed copies of the translation had been distributed as of March 2013, and over 500 million as of March 2023. The NIV is the best-selling translation in the United States.

== History ==
=== Beginnings ===
In 1955, businessman Howard Long was convinced of the need for a contemporary English translation of the Bible while sharing the gospel with a business associate. He was unhappy with the King James Version that he used to communicate the gospel and was frustrated with its archaic language. He thought, "Everywhere I go, in Canada, the U.S., anywhere, there are people who would like to read their Bible to their children at night. And they don't have something the children can grasp." He shared the frustration with his pastor, Reverend Peter DeJong. Inspired by the need for a Bible in contemporary English, the two men petitioned their denomination, Christian Reformed Church (CRC). After initial rejection and deferral, the CRC endorsed a committee to investigate the issue in 1957.

The NIV began with the formation of a small committee to study the value of producing a translation in the common language of the American people and a project of the National Association of Evangelicals in 1957. In 1964, a joint committee of representatives from the Christian Reformed Church and National Association of Evangelicals issued invitations to a translation conference, which met in August 1965 at Trinity Christian College in Palos Heights, Illinois, and made two key decisions. The first was that "a contemporary English translation of the Bible should be undertaken as a collegiate endeavor of evangelical scholars." The second was that a "continuing committee of fifteen" should be established to move the work forward. The "committee of fifteen" was ultimately named the Committee on Bible Translation (CBT), and the "Contemporary English Translation" became the NIV.

In 1967, the New York Bible Society (now called Biblica) took responsibility for the project and hired a team of 15 scholars from various Evangelical Christian denominations and from various countries. The initial "Committee on Bible Translation" consisted of Leslie Carlson, Edmund Clowney, Ralph Earle, Jr., Burton L. Goddard, R. Laird Harris, Earl S. Kalland, Kenneth Kantzer, Robert H. Mounce, Charles F. Pfeiffer, Charles Caldwell Ryrie, Francis R. Steele, John H. Stek, J. C. Wenger, Stephen W. Paine, and Marten Woudstra. The New Testament was released in 1973 and the full Bible in 1978. A UK version was also released to accommodate differences between American English and British English.

The NIV underwent a minor revision in 1984.

=== Inclusive-language editions ===
In 1995, a new version of the New Testament and Psalms was published in the UK, and the full Bible followed in 1996 as the New International Version Inclusive Language Edition, but it was not published in the US because of opposition from conservative evangelical groups there to gender-neutral language. A further edition with minor edits was published in 1999. A revised English edition, Today's New International Version (TNIV), again used gender-neutral language and was released as a New Testament in March 2002, with the complete Bible being published in February 2005.

=== 2011 update ===
In 2011, an updated version of the NIV was released, with both the 1984 version and the TNIV being discontinued.

The update modified and dropped some of the gender-neutral language compared to TNIV, which included going back to using "mankind" and "man," rather than "human beings" and "people." Keith Danby, the president and chief executive officer of Biblica, speaking of the TNIV, said that they had failed to convince people that revisions were needed and that they had underestimated their readers' loyalty to the 1984 edition.

=== Derivative versions ===
==== Plain English version (NIrV) ====
An easier to read version, New International Reader's Version (NIrV), was published in 1996. It was written at a third-grade reading level to grant the ability to read the Bible to those with limited English literacy.

==== Spanish version (NVI) ====
In 1979, the decision was made to produce a version of the New Testament in Spanish with the title La Santa Biblia, Nueva Versión Internacional (often abbreviated NVI), but that version was based only on the former English translation of the historic manuscripts. In 1990, the committee on Bible translation headed by Drs. René Padilla and Luciano Jaramillo conducted a translation of both testaments from the historic manuscripts directly into Spanish, bypassed English altogether, and produced a complete Spanish NVI Bible in 1999.

==== Portuguese version (NVI) ====
In 2001, the Nova Versão Internacional in Portuguese was published.

== Textual basis ==
The manuscript base for the Old Testament was the Biblia Hebraica Stuttgartensia Masoretic Hebrew Text. Other ancient texts consulted were the Dead Sea Scrolls, the Septuagint, the Samaritan Pentateuch, the Aquila, Symmachus and Theodotion, the Latin Vulgate, the Syriac Peshitta, the Aramaic Targum, and, for the Psalms, the Juxta Hebraica of Jerome. The manuscript base for the New Testament was the Koine Greek language editions of the United Bible Societies and of Nestle-Aland. The deuterocanonical books are not included in the translation.

== Translation methodology ==
The core translation group consisted of fifteen Biblical scholars using Hebrew, Aramaic, and Greek texts whose goal was to produce a more modern English language text than the King James Version. The translation took ten years and involved a team of over 100 scholars from the United States, Canada, the United Kingdom, Australia, New Zealand, and South Africa. The range of those participating included many different denominations, such as Anglican, Catholic, Assemblies of God, Baptist, Christian Reformed, Lutheran and Presbyterian.

The NIV is a balance between word-for-word and thought-for-thought or literal and phrase-by-phrase translations. However, there are multiple places where the NIV uses different tenses compared with the Hebrew text.

Recent archaeological and linguistic discoveries helped in understanding passages that have traditionally been difficult to translate. Familiar spellings of traditional translations were generally retained.

== Reception ==
According to NIV translator Mark Strauss, the New International Version has become the most popular selling English translation of the Bible, having sold more than 500 million copies worldwide.

There are numerous study Bibles available with extensive notes on the text and background information to make the Biblical stories more comprehensible. Among these are the NIV Spirit of the Reformation Study Bible, Concordia Study Bible, the Zondervan published NIV Study Bible, the Wesleyan revision, Reflecting God Study Bible, as well as the Life Application Study Bible.

In 2009, the New Testament scholar N. T. Wright wrote that the NIV obscured what Paul the Apostle was saying and ensured that Paul's words conformed to Protestant and Evangelical tradition. He claimed, "if a church only, or mainly, relies on the NIV it will, quite simply, never understand what Paul was talking about", especially in Galatians and Romans.

In support of that claim, Wright specifically mentioned several verses of Romans 3, which he suggested not to convey how "righteousness" refers to the covenant faithfulness of God or reflect his own thinking about the pistis Christou debate. All editions of the NIV have given "God's Faithfulness" as the heading for Romans 3:1–8. Wright's specific objections concerning verses later in the chapter no longer apply to the 2011 revision of the NIV, which moreover offers "the faithfulness of Jesus Christ" as an alternative translation to "faith in Jesus Christ" in Romans 3:22.

Mark Given, a professor of religious studies at Missouri State University, criticized the NIV for "several inaccurate and misleading translations" since many sentences and clauses are paraphrased, rather than translated from Hebrew and Greek.

Michael Marlowe, a scholar in biblical languages, criticized as "indefensible" the footnote provided in the NIV for 1 Corinthians 11:4–7, which replaced multiple instances of "head covering" with "long hair" to "harmonize this passage with modern habits of dress". Church historian David Bercot, whose focus is early Christianity, likewise deemed the footnote a "fanciful interpretation" that "is in no way an alternate translation of the Greek text."

Others have also criticized the NIV. In Genesis 2:19, a translation such as the New Revised Standard Version uses "formed" in the simple past tense: "So out of the ground the LORD God formed every animal." Some have questioned the NIV's choice to use the pluperfect: "Now the LORD God had formed out of the ground all the wild animals" to try to make it appear that the animals had already been created. Theologian John Sailhamer stated, "Not only is such a translation [...] hardly possible [...] but it misses the very point of the narrative, namely, that the animals were created in response to God's declaration that it was not good that the man should be alone." There are also multiple places where the NIV uses different tenses compared with the Hebrew text.

The NIV is also one of the only translations to render the end of Numbers 5:22 as "womb miscarries", a translation considered less accurate by the majority of biblical scholars. Deuteronomy 22:28 has also been considered mistranslated by the vast majority of scholars, with the word usually rendered "take" or "seize" being instead rendered as "rape", a translation not supported by the original text.

Biblical scholar Bruce M. Metzger criticized the NIV 1984 edition for the addition of "just" into Jeremiah 7:22 in which the verse becomes "For when I brought your forefathers/ancestors out of Egypt and spoke to them, I did not just give them commands about burnt offerings and sacrifices." Metzger also criticized the addition of "your" into Matthew 13:32, which becomes "Though it [the mustard seed] is the smallest of all your seeds." The word your was removed from that verse in the 2011 revision.

=== 2011 revision ===
Professor of New Testament Studies Daniel B. Wallace praised the 2011 update and called it "a well-thought out translation, with checks and balances through rigorous testing, overlapping committees to ensure consistency and accuracy, and a publisher willing to commit significant resources to make this Bible appealing to the Christian reader." The Southern Baptist Convention rejected the 2011 update because of gender-neutral language, although the update had dropped some gender-neutral language used in the 2005 revision.

Southern Baptist publisher LifeWay declined the Southern Baptist Convention's censor request to remove the NIV from its stores. While the Lutheran Church–Missouri Synod rejected its use, some in the Wisconsin Evangelical Lutheran Synod (WELS) believe many of the translations changes are right and defensible.

Professor of New Testament Studies Rodney J. Decker wrote in the Themelios Journal review of the NIV 2011:

By taking a mediating position between formal and functional equivalence (though tending, I think, closer to the formal end of the spectrum), the NIV has been able to produce a text that is clearer than many translations, especially those weighted more heavily with formal equivalence ... If we are serious about making the word of God a vital tool in the lives of English-speaking Christians, then we must aim for a translation that communicates clearly in the language of the average English-speaking person. It is here that the NIV excels. It not only communicates the meaning of God's revelation accurately, but does so in English that is easily understood by a wide range of English speakers. It is as well-suited for expository preaching as it is for public reading and use in Bible classes and children's ministries.

== See also ==
- Modern English Bible translations
