= Victor P. Hamilton =

Canadian / American theologian (born 1941)

- Born: September 26, 1941 (age 85); Toronto, Ontario, Canada
- Education: Brandeis University (Ph.D.)
- Known for: Professor of Old Testament at Asbury University
- Movement: Wesleyan Church
- Spouse: Shirley
- Children: Four

Victor P. Hamilton (born 26 September 1941) is a Canadian / American Old Testament scholar. He was Professor of Old Testament and Theology at Asbury University from 1971 until 2007. He retains the role of professor emeritus of Old Testament at Asbury University.

He has a BA from Houghton College, New York, 1963 a BD and ThM from Asbury Theological Seminary, Wilmore, Kentucky, 1966 and 1967 and an MA and PhD in Mediterranean Studies from Brandeis University in Waltham, Massachusetts, 1969 and 1971.

He is author of major commentaries on Genesis and Exodus; also authoring the respected Handbook on the Historical Books.

== Bibliography ==
- Handbook on the Pentateuch: Genesis, Exodus, Leviticus, Numbers, Deuteronomy (Baker Academic, 1982) ISBN 978-0801027161
- The Book of Genesis: Chapters 1-17 NICOT (Eerdmans, 1990) ISBN 978-0802825216
- The Book of Genesis: Chapters 18-50 NICOT (Eerdmans, 1990) ISBN 978-0802823090
- Handbook on the Historical Books: Joshua, Judges, Ruth, Samuel, Kings, Chronicles, Ezra-Nehemiah, Esther (Baker Academic, 2001) ISBN 978-0801036149
- Exodus: An Exegetical Commentary (Baker Academic, 2011) ISBN 978-0801031830
