= Peter Craigie =

British biblical scholar (1938–1985)

Peter Campbell Craigie
- Born: 18 August 1938; Lancaster, United Kingdom
- Died: 26 September 1985 (aged 47); Alberta, Canada
- Occupations: Professor; theologian; scholar; author
- Notable work: The Book of Deuteronomy (1976)
- Religion: Christian
- Theological work
- Era: Mid-20th century
- Language: English
- Tradition or movement: Anglican
- Main interests: Old Testament studies; Semitic languages

Peter Campbell Craigie (18 August 1938 – 26 September 1985) was a British biblical scholar.

Craigie was born in Lancaster and grew up in Edinburgh. He studied successively at the Edinburgh Academy, the Prairie College in Alberta, New College at the University of Edinburgh, St. John's College at the University of Durham, the University of Aberdeen, and McMaster University. He then taught at Carleton University, McMaster University, and the University of Calgary. He died as the result of a car crash in 1985.

Craigie wrote commentaries on Deuteronomy, Ezekiel, the Twelve Prophets, and Psalms 1 – 50. He referred to his approach as "theological-historical" or "theological-scientific". Lyle Eslinger notes that Craigie's approach was "a melding of conservative theological interests and assumptions with the scientific methods of biblical criticism." Tremper Longman describes him as being "among the best of recent evangelical interpreters" as well as "an astute theologian and philologist".

In 1988, a Festschrift was published in his honour. Ascribe to the Lord: Biblical and Other Studies in Memory of Peter C. Craigie included contributions from R. K. Harrison, Kenneth Kitchen, Alan Millard, and Robert Polzin. The Canadian Society of Biblical Studies sponsors the biannual Craigie Lecture in his memory.

== Works ==
=== Books ===
- Craigie, Peter C. (1976). The Book of Deuteronomy. New International Commentary on the Old Testament. Grand Rapids, MI: Eerdmans. ISBN 978-0-802-82355-7. OCLC 2390603.
- ——— (1976). Ugaritic Studies I, 1972-1976. Calgary, Alberta: University of Calgary, Dept. of Religious Studies. OCLC 6943702.
- ——— (1978). The Problem of War in the Old Testament. Grand Rapids, MI: Eerdmans. ISBN 9780802817426. OCLC 3966010.
- ——— (1980). Ugaritic Studies II, 1976-1979. Calgary, Alberta: University of Calgary, Dept. of Religious Studies. OCLC 6770323.
- ——— (1983). Psalms 1-50. Word Biblical Commentary. Vol. 19. Dallas, TX: Word. ISBN 978-0-849-90218-5. OCLC 48898166.
- ——— (1983). Ezekiel. Daily Study Bible. Philadelphia: Westminster Press. ISBN 978-0-664-24574-0. OCLC 9413227.
- ——— (1983). Ugaritic Studies III, 1980-1983. Calgary, Alberta: University of Calgary, Dept. of Religious Studies. OCLC 10789260.
- ——— (1983). Ugarit and the Old Testament. Grand Rapids, MI: Eerdmans. ISBN 978-0-802-81928-4. OCLC 8805927.
- ——— (1984). Twelve Prophets, Vol. 1: Hosea, Joel, Amos, Obadiah, and Jonah. Daily Study Bible. Philadelphia: Westminster Press. ISBN 978-0-664-24577-1.
- ——— (1985). Twelve Prophets, Vol. 2: Micah, Nahum, Habakkuk, Zephaniah, Haggai, Zechariah and Malachi. Daily Study Bible. Philadelphia: Westminster Press. ISBN 978-0-664-24582-5.
- ——— (1986). The Old Testament: Its Background, Growth, and Content. Nashville, TN: Abingdon Press. ISBN 978-0-687-28751-2. OCLC 13823142.
- ———; Kelley, Page H.; Drinkard, Joel F. (1991). Jeremiah 1-25. Word Biblical Commentary. Vol. 26. Dallas, TX: Word. ISBN 978-0-849-90225-3. OCLC 24679281.

=== Articles ===
- ——— (1969). "The Conquest and Early Hebrew Poetry". Tyndale Bulletin. 20: 76–94.
- ——— (1970). "Hebrew Thought about God and Nature and its Contemporary Significance" (PDF). Canadian Journal of Theology. 16 (1/2): 3–11.
- ——— (June 1972). "Reconsideration of Shamgar Ben Anath (Judg 3:31 and 5:6)". Journal of Biblical Literature. 91 (2): 239–240. doi:10.2307/3263208. JSTOR 3263208.
- ——— (1976). "Deuteronomy and Ugaritic Studies". Tyndale Bulletin. 27: 155–169.

== Festschrift ==
- Eslinger, Lyle M.; Taylor, Glen, eds. (1988). Ascribe to the Lord: Biblical & other essays in memory of Peter C. Craigie. Journal for the Study of the Old Testament, Supplement Series. Vol. 67. Sheffield, England: JSOT Press. ISBN 978-1-850-75189-2. OCLC 41326387.
