= Logos Complete Study Bible =

Study Bible published in 1972

The Logos Complete Study Bible is a study Bible published in 1972 by Logos International. It is based upon The Cross-Reference Bible, published in 1910.

The Logos Bible uses the 1901 American Standard Version (ASV) translation of the Bible, which has been called "The Rock of Biblical Honesty" by Bible scholars. This study Bible has:

- 100,000 cross-references, which is more than many study Bibles
- Topical articles and analyses spread throughout the text
- Variorum readings by some 150 scholars

No further editions were published. The company itself failed not many years after publication.

== Comparison to The Cross-Reference Bible ==
The Scripture text, variant renderings and readings, topical analyses, most of the Preface, and Index of the Logos International Study Bible are almost entirely photo-reprinted from "The Cross-Reference Bible containing the Old and New Testaments", edited by Monser and copyright by him in 1910. The title page of the 1910 edition says "The text of this Bible is that of the American Standard Edition of the Revised Bible (Copyright, 1901, by Thomas Nelson & Sons), With Variorum Readings and Renderings, With Topical Analysis and Cross References." The Cross-Reference Bible was reprinted several times after 1910, including once by Baker Book House in 1959. The Logos edition excluded the following items from the Cross-Reference Bible:

- Several paragraphs of the Cross-Reference Bible Preface,
- An entire page pertaining to abbreviations identifying New Testament manuscripts (such as part of the description of Codex Alexandrinus, as well as the entire description of Codex Vaticanus Graecus 1209, and numerous other Codices),
- A two-page section called Analysis of the Pentateuch,
- Extracts from the Preface to the American [Standard] Version,
- Index to Nelson's Bible Atlas,
- Index to Littlefield Maps,
- Color maps associated with the two map indexes.

The Logos edition added:

- The Layman's Commentary on the Holy Spirit
- A concordance drawn from the King James Version instead of the American Standard Version,
- A different set of color maps.

== In-text features ==
The following example is part of the first column of page 1756, which includes parts of Matthew 2:23 and 3:1:

23
1. City, Gen.
  4:17
2. Prophecies
  concerning
  Jesus, Gen.
  3:15
3. See “Inspira-
  ation of Proph-
  ets." II Ki.
  17:13.
1. Q. Is. 11:1 in
  the Heb. 7
4. See Mk. 1:24.
1
5. P. Vs. 1-12;
  Mk. 1:3-8; Lu.
  3:2-17; comp.
  John 1:6-8,
  10-28.
6. Day, Lev.
  25:8

dwelt in a city^{a} called *Nǎz’-ǎ-
rěth; that it might be fulfilled
^{b} which was spoken ^{c}through the
prophets, ^{1}that he should be
called a ^{d} Nǎz-ǎ-rẽne’.

3

And ^{e}in those ^{f}days
cometh † John the Bǎp’-

Var. Rend.— V. 23 that ... Nazarene
—because he would be called a Nazarene,
LUTHER; despised like a Nazarene, OL.
LAN. W. BROAD. Nazarene—i.e. a
'netzer' or Branch with reference to Is. 11:1,
Fri. DeW. Me. Wa. Delilzsh.; a Nazarite
(i.e. separate with some reference to the
order of Nazirites, Num. 6:1–20), Text.
Jer., Mcl. ERASMUS, BEZA, HO, WET-
STEIN, GROTTUS; the man of Nazareth,
ME. BRU. Chap. J. — V. 1, cometh—
comes forward. Al. steps forth, HO.;

* NAZARETH: A City of Galilee.—Mt. 2:23; 21:11; Mk.
1:9; Lu. 1:26. Build on a Hill—Lu. 4:29.
Wicked and Despised City.—John 1:46. Their Unbelief—
Mt. 13:54-58.
Home of Joseph and Mary.—Lu. 1:26-30; 2:51
Home of Christ.—Mt. 2:23; 4:13; 13:54; 21:11; 26:71; Mk.
1:9, 24; 6:1; 10:47; 14:67; 16:6; Lu. 2:51; 4:34; 18:37; 24:19;
John 1:45, 46; 19:19; Acts 2:22; 3:6; 4:10; 6:14; 10:38; 22:8;
26:9. Christ rejected at—Mk. 6:1-6; Lu. 4:29.

† JOHN THE BAPTIST: Career.—Announcement of Birth
—Lu. 1:5-25; Time in days of Herod the Great B.C. 6—
Lu 1:5. Piety and old age of Zacharias and Elizabeth—
Lu. 1:5 f. Barrenness of Elizabeth—Lu. 1:7. Zacharias a
Priest in service when the angel Gabriel appears to him.—Lu
1:8-13. The name of the child (John) given by the angel—
...

=== Margin notes ===
The letter a that appears after the word "city" in the first line corresponds to the "a" in the left margin, where there is an entry containing "Gen. 4:17". In the text of Genesis chapter 4, verse 17, the word "city" also appears, where it has the symbol "‡" next to it. At the bottom of that page, there is an article entitled CITY, next to the symbol "‡", which has nearly all of the references in the Bible to the word or idea of "city". In the fourth line, there is a superscript "1" next to the word "that". The corresponding margin entry has the letter "Q", followed by a reference to Isaiah, chapter 11, verse 1. This indicates that the passage that follows the letter, in the text, is a quotation from the Old Testament. Similarly, parallel passages are indicated with a P, as used under footnote "e" for chapter 3 verse 1 in the left margin.

=== Footnote articles ===
At the bottom of the page are two more examples of in-text articles. The article for Nazareth is referenced from verse 23 with the symbol "*", and the article for John the Baptist, with the symbol "†". The latter article continues for two more columns in the text.

=== Pronunciation ===
In the first and fifth lines, the words Nazarene and Nazareth are rendered Nǎz’ǎrẽth and Nǎz-ǎ-rẽne’, respectively. These are indications of the pronunciation, and are given for most words translated or adapted from Biblical languages, particularly including place and personal names. The editors chose the then-current means employed by the Webster's International Dictionary to indicate pronunciation.

=== Variorum readings ===
Translation always involves a certain amount of subjective judgment. The Logos Bible endeavors to make all such judgments explicit and available to the reader. These are given immediately under the text, in the section labeled "Var. rend.". The variorum readings include those from the Variorum Bible. To this extensive set of readings was added the work of some 150 highly regarded Bible scholars. (Note: The process by which scholars were selected is described in detail on page ix of the work.)

== Other features ==
Following a comprehensive index, which lists all of the in-text articles and references, the Logos Bible includes The Layman's Commentary on the Holy Spirit, edited by John Rea. The Layman's Commentary includes in-depth treatment of most New Testament passages that deal with the Holy Spirit, beginning with Matthew 3:11-17 (the baptism of Jesus). The commentary comprises over 100 pages, and draws from a number of English translations, Bible commentaries and dictionaries. The Layman's Commentary was also published separately by Logos International, also in 1972, as ISBN 0-912106-22-0 and ISBN 0-912106-38-7.

Finally, the Logos Bible also includes a concordance, coordinated with the index, and a number of maps.
