= John Nolland =

Australian priest

John Nolland is an Australian Anglican priest and Bible scholar. He is Tutor in New Testament at Trinity College, Bristol and also holds the title of visiting professor at the University of Bristol.

He served in the Anglican Diocese of Sydney and taught at Regent College in British Columbia, Canada. He has a background in science.

His studies focus on the Gospels and he has written books on the Gospels of Luke and Matthew.

== Works ==
=== Books ===
- ——— (1989). Luke 1:1-9:20. Word Biblical Commentary. Vol. 35a. Thomas Nelson. ISBN 978-0849902345.
- ——— (1993). Luke 9:21-18:34. Word Biblical Commentary. Vol. 35b. Thomas Nelson. ISBN 978-0849902543.
- ——— (1993). Luke 18:35-24:53. Word Biblical Commentary. Vol. 35c. Thomas Nelson. ISBN 978-0849910722.
- ——— (2005). The Gospel of Matthew: a commentary on the Greek text. New International Greek Testament Commentary. Grand Rapids, MI: Eerdmans. ISBN 9780802823892. OCLC 61500043.
- ———; Gurtner, Daniel M. (2008). Built Upon the Rock: studies in the Gospel of Matthew. Grand Rapids, MI: Eerdmans. ISBN 9780802845634. OCLC 177059616.

=== Articles and Chapters ===
- ——— (October 1996). "A Text-Critical Discussion of Matthew 1:16". Catholic Biblical Quarterly. 58 (4): 665–673.
- ——— (April 1998). "The Sources for Matthew 2:1-12". Catholic Biblical Quarterly. 60 (2): 283–300.
- ——— (2000). "Romans 1:26-27 and the Homosexuality Debate". Horizons in Biblical Theology. 22 (1): 32–57. doi:10.1163/187122000X00036.

== Festschrift ==
- White, Aaron W.; Evans, Craig A.; Wenham, David, eds. (2018). The earliest perceptions of Jesus in context: essays in honor of John Nolland on his 70th birthday. Library of New Testament studies. Vol. 566. London, UK & New York, NY: T & T Clark. ISBN 9780567671776. OCLC 1021055854.
