= William D. Mounce =

American scholar of New Testament Greek (born 1953)

- Born: February 17, 1953 (age 73); Pasadena, California, United States
- Occupation: New Testament Greek scholar
- Title: Former professor of New Testament and director of the Greek Program at Gordon-Conwell Theological Seminary
- Spouse: Robin
- Children: 3
- Relatives: Robert H. Mounce (father)

Academic background
- Education: Bethel College, St. Paul; Western Kentucky University; Fuller Theological Seminary; Aberdeen University
- Alma mater: Aberdeen University (PhD)
- Thesis: The Origin of the New Testament Metaphor of Rebirth (1981)
- Doctoral advisor: I. Howard Marshall

Academic work
- Discipline: New Testament Greek studies
- Institutions: Gordon-Conwell Theological Seminary
- Notable works: Basics of Biblical Greek, Pastoral Epistles (Word Biblical Commentary Vol. 46), The Morphology of Biblical Greek, The Analytical Lexicon to the Greek New Testament
- Website: billmounce.com

William D. Mounce (born 17 February 1953) is an American scholar of New Testament Greek. He has also worked as an author, teacher and preacher.

== Education ==
- Ph.D. 1981, in New Testament. Aberdeen University, Aberdeen, Scotland.
- M.A. 1977, in Biblical Studies. Fuller Theological Seminary, Pasadena, California.
- B.A. 1975, in Biblical Studies, minor in Greek. Bethel College, St. Paul, Minnesota; Western Kentucky University, Bowling Green, Kentucky, 1971–74.

== Career ==
Mounce taught at Azusa Pacific University for ten years. He then worked as a professor of New Testament and director of the Greek Program at Gordon-Conwell Theological Seminary. He also worked as a preaching pastor at a church in Spokane, Washington.

He was the New Testament chair of the English Standard Version (ESV) translation of the Bible, and serves on the New International Version (NIV) translation committee.

He is the founder and president of Biblical Training, a non-profit organization offering educational resources for discipleship in the local church. At his personal site, he also writes blogs including Monday with Mounce and Greek Word for the Day.

Mounce authored the bestselling Greek textbook, Basics of Biblical Greek, which won a 2003 Reader's Preference Editor's Choice Award in the Sacred Texts category.

== Personal life ==
He has been married to Robin since 1983 and they have three adult children.

William and Robin live in Ione, Washington.

== Works ==
- Mounce, William D. (1993). The Analytical Lexicon to the Greek New Testament. Grand Rapids, MI: Zondervan. ISBN 978-0-310-54210-0.
- Mounce, William D. (1994). The Morphology of Biblical Greek. Grand Rapids, MI: Zondervan. ISBN 978-0-310-22636-9.
- Mounce, William D.; Hughes, John J. (1996). God's Word Complete Concordance. God's Word Series. Cleveland, OH & New York, NY: World Publishing. ISBN 978-0-5291-0469-4.
- Mounce, William D. (1996). A Graded Reader of Biblical Greek. Grand Rapids, MI: Zondervan. ISBN 978-0-310-20582-1.
- Mounce, William D. (2000). Pastoral Epistles. Word Biblical Commentary. Vol. 46. Nashville, TN: Thomas Nelson. ISBN 978-0-8499-0245-1.
- Mounce, William D. (2000). The NIV English-Greek New Testament: A Reverse Interlinear. Zondervan Interpreting the Bible. Grand Rapids, MI: Zondervan. ISBN 978-0-310-20377-3.
- Mounce, William D. (2002). The Crossway Comprehensive Concordance of the Holy Bible: English Standard Version. Wheaton, IL: Crossway Books. ISBN 978-1-581-34386-1.
- Mounce, William D. (2003). Greek for the Rest of Us. Grand Rapids, MI: Zondervan. ISBN 978-0-310-27710-1.
- Mounce, William D. (2003). Basics of Biblical Greek: Grammar (2nd ed.). Grand Rapids, MI: Zondervan.
- Mounce, William D. (2003). Basics of Biblical Greek: Workbook (2nd ed.). Grand Rapids, MI: Zondervan. ISBN 978-0-310-25086-9.
- Mounce, William D. (2006). Interlinear for the Rest of Us: The Reverse Interlinear for New Testament Word Studies.
- Mounce, William D. (2006). Mounce's Complete Expository Dictionary of Old and New Testament Words. Grand Rapids, MI: Zondervan. ISBN 978-0-310-24878-1.
- Mounce, William D., ed. (2008). Greek and English Interlinear (NASB/NIV). Grand Rapids, MI: Zondervan. ISBN 978-0310241393.
- Mounce, William D., ed. (2008). Greek and English Interlinear (KJV/NIV). Grand Rapids, MI: Zondervan. ISBN 978-0-310-24164-5.
- Mounce, William D. (2009). Basics of Biblical Greek: Grammar (3rd ed.). Grand Rapids, MI: Zondervan. ISBN 978-0-310-28768-1.
- Mounce, William D. (2003). Basics of Biblical Greek: Workbook (3rd ed.). Grand Rapids, MI: Zondervan. ISBN 978-0-310-28767-4.
- Mounce, William D. (2011). Biblical Greek: A Compact Guide. Grand Rapids, MI: Zondervan. ISBN 978-0-310-32606-9.
- Mounce, William D.; Mounce, Robert H. (2011). NASB/NIV Greek & English Interlinear New Testament. Grand Rapids, MI: Zondervan. ISBN 978-0310492962.
- Mounce, William D. (2021). Why I Trust the Bible: Answers to Real Questions and Doubts People Have about the Bible. Grand Rapids, MI: Zondervan Reflective. ISBN 978-0310109945.
