= John H. Stek =

American biblical scholar and academic (1925–2009)

John Henry Stek (March 7, 1925 – June 6, 2009) was an American pastor, biblical scholar and translator, and Old Testament professor.

== Background and education ==
Stek was born in Oskaloosa, Iowa, to William and Gertie Stek. His studies at Calvin College were interrupted for a tour of duty with the Army in the Pacific Ocean theater of World War II from 1944 to 1946, but he returned to marry Nadine Ruth De Bruin in 1948 and earn his A.B. in 1949. He went on to earn his B.D. (1952) from Calvin Theological Seminary, and his Th.M. (1955) from Westminster Theological Seminary. Stek was ordained as a minister in the Christian Reformed Church in Raymond, Minnesota. He pursued further post-graduate studies at the University of Chicago from 1965 to 1966, and doctoral work at the Free University of Amsterdam from 1973 to 1974.

== Career ==
Stek joined the faculty of Calvin Theological Seminary in 1961 as a professor of Old Testament, continuing until his retirement in 1990. He joined the Committee on Bible Translation in 1965, and later served as Chairman for 15 years. He was a member of the team that translated the New International Version (1978) and Today's New International Version (2003). In 1978, he began work as editor of the NIV Study Bible, published in 1985 and fully revised in 2002.

Stek also served his denomination on several synodical study committees: Infallibility (1959-1961), Neo-Pentecostalism (1971-1973), Revision of the Form of Subscription (1974-1976), and Interchurch and interdenominational Relations (1975-1981). In 2008, Stek was presented with a Distinguished Alumni Award from Calvin Theological Seminary.
