= Hugh G. M. Williamson =

British theologian and academic (born 1947)

Hugh Godfrey Maturin Williamson OBE FBA (born 15 July 1947) is a theologian and academic. He was Regius Professor of Hebrew at the University of Oxford from 1992 to 2014, a position he now holds as Emeritus.

== Career ==
Williamson has authored major commentaries on Ezra/Nehemiah in the Word Biblical Commentary series and a multi-volumed commentary of Isaiah 1-27 for the International Critical Commentary series. For the latter, volume 1 was published in 2006 and volume 2 in 2019.

He has been chairman of the British Academy's Humanities Group and also chairman of the Anglo-Israel Archaeological Society.

He remains secretary to the executive committee of the Semantics of Ancient Hebrew Database project.

Williamson remains active in his research interests, which include the Book of Isaiah and the Achaemenid Period history and literature.

A festschrift was published in 2012 for H. G. M. Williamson on the occasion of his sixty-fifth birthday.

== Honours ==
He was appointed Officer of the Order of the British Empire (OBE) in the 2015 New Year Honours for services to scholarship and theology.

== Works ==
=== Books ===
- Williamson, Hugh G. M. (1985). Ezra, Nehemiah. Word Biblical Commentary. Vol. 16. Waco, TX: Word Books. ISBN 978-0-849-90215-4. OCLC 12437788.
- ——— (1982). 1 and 2 Chronicles. The New Century Bible Commentary. Grand Rapids: William B. Eerdmans Publishing Company. ISBN 0-8028-1925-7. OCLC 71298301.
- ——— (2006). A Critical and Exegetical Commentary on Isaiah 1-27: Isaiah 1-5 (Volume 1). International Critical Commentary. London: T & T Clark. ISBN 978-0-567-04451-8. OCLC 71298301.
- ——— (2008). Holy, Holy, Holy: The Story of a Liturgical Formula. Julius-Wellhausen-Vorlesung. Vol. 1. Berlin; New York: Walter de Gruyter. ISBN 978-3-110-20716-3. OCLC 316833005.
- ——— (2012). He Has Shown You What is Good: Old Testament Justice Then and Now (The Trinity Lectures, Singapore, 2011). Cambridge: Lutterworth Press. ISBN 978-0-718-89298-2. OCLC 768167987.

=== Chapters ===
- ——— (2001). "32. Micah". In Barton, John; Muddiman, John (eds.). Oxford Bible Commentary. pp. 595–599.
- ——— (2012). "Scribe and Scroll: Revisiting the Great Isaiah Scroll from Qumran". In Clines, David J. A.; Richards, Kent Harold; Wright, Jacob L. (eds.). Making a Difference: Essays on the Bible and Judaism in Honor of Tamara Cohn Eskenazi. Hebrew Bible Monographs. Vol. 49. Sheffield: Sheffield Phoenix Press. pp. 329–42. ISBN 978-1-907-53472-0.
- ——— (2013). "The Vindication of Redaction Criticism". In Dell, Katharine J.; Joyce, Paul M. (eds.). Biblical Interpretation and Method: Essays in Honour of John Barton. Oxford: Oxford University Press. pp. 26–36. ISBN 978-0-199-64553-4.
- ——— (2013). "Isaiah: Prophet of Weal or Woe?". In Gordon, Robert P.; Bartsad, Hans M. (eds.). "Thus Speaks Ishtar of Arbela": Prophecy in Israel, Assyria, and Egypt in the Neo-Assyrian Period. Winona Lake, OH: Eisenbrauns. pp. 273–300. ISBN 978-1-575-06282-2.
- ——— (2013). "Was There an Image of the Deity in the First Temple?". In Pearce, Sarah (ed.). The Image and its Prohibition in Jewish Antiquity. JJS Supplement Series 2. Oxford: Journal of Jewish Studies. pp. 28–37. ISBN 978-0-957-52280-0. OCLC 863324614.

== Festschrift ==
- Provan, Iain W.; Boda, Mark J., eds. (2012). Let us go up to Zion: essays in honour of H. G. M. Williamson on the occasion of his sixty-fifth birthday. Supplements to Vetus Testamentum. Vol. 153. Leiden; Boston: Brill. ISBN 978-9-004-22658-6. OCLC 801777561.

Academic offices
Preceded by James Barr	Regius Professor of Hebrew, Oxford; 1992–2014	Succeeded by Jan Joosten
