= Daniel I. Block =

Canadian/American Old Testament scholar

- Born: Daniel I. Block; May 22, 1943; Borden, Saskatchewan, Canada
- Education: D.Phil., School of Archaeology and Oriental Studies, University of Liverpool
- Known for: Gunther H. Knoedler Professor Emeritus of Old Testament at Wheaton College.

Daniel Isaac Block (born 1943) is a Canadian/American Old Testament scholar. He is Gunther H. Knoedler Professor Emeritus of Old Testament at Wheaton College.

He graduated from Borden High School (Borden, Saskatchewan, 1961), received a three-year Diploma in Biblical Studies (Bethany College, Hepburn, Saskatchewan, 1965), was awarded a BEd (University of Saskatchewan, Saskatoon, 1968), studied at Friedrich Alexander University, Erlangen, Germany, 1968–1969), awarded BA (University of Saskatchewan, Saskatoon, 1969), MA (Trinity Evangelical Divinity School, Deerfield, Illinois, 1973), D.Phil. (School of Archaeology and Oriental Studies, University of Liverpool, 1982).

He has worked as a senior translator on the New Living Translation, revised edition with particular responsibility for the books of Moses.

== Bibliography ==
=== Books ===
- Block, Daniel I. (1988). The Gods of the Nations: Studies in Ancient Near Eastern National Theology. Monograph series. Vol. 2. Jackson, MS: Evangelical Theological Society. ISBN 978-0-9320-5502-6. OCLC 17981756.
- ——— (1997). The Book of Ezekiel: Chapters 1-24. NICOT. Grand Rapids, MI: Eerdmans. ISBN 978-0-802-82535-3.
- ——— (1998). The Book of Ezekiel: Chapters 25-48. NICOT. Grand Rapids, MI: Eerdmans. ISBN 978-0-802-82536-0.
- ——— (1999). Judges, Ruth. NAC. Nashville, TN: Broadman & Holman. ISBN 978-0-805-40106-6. OCLC 40609737.
- ———, ed. (2008). Israel: Ancient Kingdom or Late Invention. Nashville, TN: Broadman & Holman. ISBN 978-0-805-44679-1.
- ———; Toly, Noah J., eds. (2010). Keeping God's Earth: the global environment in biblical perspective. Downers Grove, IL: InterVarsity Press. ISBN 978-0-830-83883-7. OCLC 542321794.
- ———, ed. (2011). How I Love Your Torah, O Lord!: Studies in the Book of Deuteronomy. Eugene, OR: Cascade Books. ISBN 978-1-610-97342-7.
- ——— (2012). Deuteronomy. NIV Application Commentary. Grand Rapids, MI: Zondervan. ISBN 978-0-310-21048-1. OCLC 769871182.
- ———; Milgrom, Jacob (2012). Ezekiel's Hope: A Commentary on Ezekiel 38-48. Eugene, OR: Wipf and Stock. ISBN 978-1-6109-7650-3. OCLC 814270960.
- ——— (2012). The Gospel According to Moses: theological and ethical reflections on the book of Deuteronomy. Eugene, OR: Cascade Books. ISBN 978-1-6109-7863-7. OCLC 779626645.
- ——— (2013). Beyond the River Chebar: Studies in Kingship and Eschatology in the Book of Ezekiel. Eugene, OR: Cascade Books. ISBN 978-1-6089-9249-2.
- ——— (2013). By the River Chebar: Historical, Literary, and Theological Studies in the Book of Ezekiel. Cambridge, England: James Clarke and Co. ISBN 978-0-2271-7439-5.
- ——— (2013). Obadiah: The Kingship Belongs to YHWH. Hearing the Message of Scripture series. Grand Rapids, MI: Zondervan. ISBN 9780310942405. OCLC 809925963.
- ——— (2013). The Gods of the Nations: A Study in Ancient Near Eastern National Theology (2nd revised ed.). Eugene, OR: Wipf and Stock. ISBN 978-1-6203-2974-0.
- ——— (2014). For the Glory of God: A Biblical Theology of Worship. Grand Rapids, MI: Baker Academic. ISBN 978-0-801-02698-0. OCLC 845516213.
- ——— (2015). Ruth: The King Is Coming. ZECOT. Grand Rapids, MI: Zondervan. ISBN 978-0-801-02698-0. OCLC 845516213.
- ——— (2017). The Triumph of Grace: Literary and Theological Studies in Deuteronomy and Deuteronomic Themes. Eugene, OR: Cascade. ISBN 978-1-4982-9265-8. OCLC 990288339.
- ——— (2021). Covenant: The Foundation of God's Grand Plan of Redemption. Grand Rapids, MI: Baker Academic. ISBN 978-0801097881. OCLC 2020049532.
- ———; Deuel, David C.; Collins, C. John; Lawrence, Paul J. N., eds. (2020). Write That They May Read: Studies in Literacy and Textualization in the Hebrew Scriptures; Essays in Honour of Professor Alan R. Millard. Eugene, OR: Pickwick. ISBN 978-1-7252-5210-3.
- ——— (2023). Hearing the Gospel According to Moses: Vol. 1, A Commentary on Deuteronomy 1-11. Kowloon, Hong Kong: Inspirata. ISBN 978-9888885961.
- ——— (2024). Hearing the Gospel According to Moses: Vol. 2, A Commentary on Deuteronomy 12-23. Kowloon, Hong Kong: Inspirata. ISBN 978-9888885015.
- ——— (2024). Hearing the Gospel According to Moses: Vol. 3, A Commentary on Deuteronomy 24-34. Kowloon, Hong Kong: Inspirata. ISBN 978-9888780310.

=== Articles ===
- ——— (September 1984). "The Role of Language in Ancient Israelite Perceptions of National Identity". Journal of Biblical Literature. 103 (3): 321–340. doi:10.2307/3260775. JSTOR 3260775.
- ——— (September 1985). "Israel's House: Reflections on the use of byt yśr'l in the Old Testament in the Light of its Ancient Near Eastern Environment". Journal of the Evangelical Theological Society. 28 (3): 257–275.
- ——— (July 1987). "Gog and the Pouring Out of the Spirit: Reflections on Ezekiel 39:21-29". Vetus Testamentum. 37 (3): 257–270.
- ——— (July 1988). "Text and Emotion: A Study in the 'Corruptions' in Ezekiel's Inaugural Vision (Ezekiel 1:4-28)". Catholic Biblical Quarterly. 50 (3): 418–442.
- ——— (March 1989). "The Prophet of the Spirit: The Use of rwh in the Book of Ezekiel". Journal of the Evangelical Theological Society. 32 (1): 27–49.
- ——— (Fall 1990). "Echo Narrative Technique in Hebrew Literature: A Study in Judges 19". Westminster Theological Journal. 52 (2): 325–341.
- ——— (January 1991). "Ezekiel's Boiling Cauldron: A Form-Critical Solution to Ezekiel 24:1-14". Vetus Testamentum. 41 (1): 12–37.
- ——— (1992). "Beyond the Grave: Ezekiel's Vision of Death and Afterlife". Bulletin for Biblical Research. 2: 113–141. doi:10.5325/bullbiblrese.2.1.0113. S2CID 54766192.
- ——— (April 1992). "Gog in Prophetic Tradition: A New Look at Ezekiel XXXVIII:17". Vetus Testamentum. 42 (2): 154–172. doi:10.1163/156853392X00026.
- ——— (September 1997). "Will the Real Gideon Please Stand Up?: Narrative Style and Intention in Judges 6-9". Journal of the Evangelical Theological Society. 40 (3): 353–366.
- ——— (Spring 2001). "Handel's Messiah: Biblical and Theological Perspectives". Didaskalia. 12 (2): 1–23.
- ——— (September 2001). "Recovering the Voice of Moses: The Genesis of Deuteronomy". Journal of the Evangelical Theological Society. 44 (3): 385–408.
- ——— (June 2004). "How Many is God?: An Investigation into the Meaning of Deuteronomy 6:4-5". Journal of the Evangelical Theological Society. 47 (2): 193–212.
- ——— (January 2005). "The Grace of Torah: The Mosaic Prescription for Life (Deut 4:1-8; 6:20-25)". Bibliotheca Sacra. 162 (645): 3–22.
- ——— (April 2005). "The Joy of Worship: The Mosaic Invitation to the Presence of God (Deut 12:1-14)". Bibliotheca Sacra. 162 (646): 131–149.
- ——— (July 2005). "The Burden of Leadership: The Mosaic Paradigm of Kingship (Deut 17:14-20)". Bibliotheca Sacra. 162 (647): 259–278.
- ——— (October 2005). "The Privilege of Calling: The Mosaic Paradigm for Missions (Deut 26:16-19)". Bibliotheca Sacra. 162 (648): 387–405.
- ——— (April 2006). "Preaching Old Testament Apocalyptic to a New Testament Church". Calvin Theological Journal. 41 (1): 17–52.
- ——— (April 2006). "When Nightmares Cease: A Message of Hope from Daniel 7". Calvin Theological Journal. 41 (1): 108–114.
- ——— (September 2010). "'You Shall Not Covet Your Neighbor's Wife': A Study in Deuteronomic Domestic Ideology". Journal of the Evangelical Theological Society. 53 (3): 449–474.
- ——— (January 2011). "Bearing the Name of the Lord with Honor". Bibliotheca Sacra. 168 (669): 20–31.
- ——— (Winter 2012). "Preaching Old Testament Law to New Testament Christians". Southeastern Theological Review. 3 (2): 195–221.
- ——— (Spring 2012). "'That They May Hear': Biblical Foundations for the Oral Reading of Scripture in Worship". Journal of Spiritual Formation & Soul Care. 5 (1): 5–34. doi:10.1177/193979091200500102. S2CID 171753102.
- ——— (March 2013). "'What Do These Stones Mean?': The Riddle of Deuteronomy 27". Journal of the Evangelical Theological Society. 56 (1): 17–41.

=== Chapters ===
- ——— (2005). "What has Delphi to do with Samaria?: Ambiguity and Delusion in Israelite Prophecy". In Bienkowski, Piotr; Mee, Christopher; Slater, Elizabeth (eds.). Writing and Ancient Near Eastern Society: Papers in Honour of Alan R. Millard. New York, NY: T&T Clark. ISBN 978-0-5670-2691-0.
- ——— (2010). "Preaching Ezekiel". In Kent, Grenville J. R.; Kissling, Paul J.; Turner, Laurence A. (eds.). Reclaiming the Old Testament for Christian Preaching. Downers Grove, IL: IVP Academic. ISBN 978-0-830-83887-5.
- ——— (2010). "Transformation of Royal Ideology in Ezekiel". In Tooman, William A.; Lyons, Michael A. (eds.). Transforming Visions: Transformations of Text, Tradition, and Theology in Ezekiel. Eugene, OR: Pickwick Publications. ISBN 978-1-4982-5037-5.
- ——— (2011). "The View From the Top: The Holy Spirit in the Prophets". In Firth, David G.; Wegner, Paul D. (eds.). Presence, Power, and Promise: The Role of the Spirit of God in the Old Testament. Downers Grove, IL: IVP Academic. ISBN 978-0-830-83957-5.
- ——— (2013). "Eden: A Temple? A Reassessment of the Biblical Evidence". In Gurtner, Daniel M.; Gladd, Benjamin L. (eds.). From Creation to New Creation: Biblical Theology and Exegesis. Essays in Honor of G. K. Beale. Peabody, MA: Hendrickson. ISBN 978-0-830-83957-5.
- ——— (2015). ""The meeting Places of God in the Land": Another Look at the Towns of the Levites". In Gane, Roy E.; Taggar-Cohen, Ada (eds.). Current Issues in Priestly and Related Literature: The Legacy of the Jacob Milgrom and Beyond. Atlanta, GA: SBL Press. ISBN 978-0-830-83957-5.
- ——— (2015). "How Can We Bless YHWH? Wrestling with Divine Violence in Deuteronomy". In Carroll R., M. Daniel; Wilgus, J. Blair (eds.). Wrestling with the Violence of God: Soundings in the Old Testament. Winona Lake, IN: Eisenbrauns. ISBN 978-0-830-83957-5.
- ——— (2015). "Deuteronomic Law". In Strawn, Brent (ed.). The Oxford Encyclopedia of the Bible and Law. Oxford, UK: Oxford University Press. ISBN 978-0-830-83957-5.
- ——— (2015). "The God Ezekiel Wants Us To Meet". In Joyce, Paul; Rom-Shiloni, Dalit (eds.). The God Ezekiel Creates. New York, NY: Continuum. ISBN 978-0-830-83957-5.
- ——— (2015). "How Can We Bless YHWH? Wrestling with Divine Violence in Deuteronomy". In Carroll R., M. Daniel; Wilgus, J. Blair (eds.). Wrestling with the Violence of God: Soundings in the Old Testament. Winona Lake, IN: Eisenbrauns. ISBN 978-0-830-83957-5.
- ——— (2015). ""In Spirit and in Truth": The Mosaic Vision of Worship". In Porter, Wendy J. (ed.). Rediscovering Worship: Past, Present, and Future. Eugene, OR: Pickwick. ISBN 978-0-830-83957-5.
- ——— (2016). "The Doctrine of the Future and Moses: "All Israel Shall Be Saved"". In Bingham, D. Jeffrey; Kreider, Glenn R. (eds.). Eschatology: Biblical, Historical, and Practical Approaches. A Volume in Honor of Craig A. Blaising. Grand Rapids, MI: Kregel. ISBN 978-0-830-83957-5.
- ——— (2020). "For Whose Eyes? The Divine Origin and Function of the Two Tablets of the Israelite Covenant". In Block, Daniel I.; Deuel, David C.; Collins, C. John; Lawrence, Paul J. N. (eds.). Write That They May Read: Studies in Literacy and Textualization in the Hebrew Scriptures; Essays in Honour of Professor Alan R. Millard. Eugene, OR: Pickwick. ISBN 978-1-7252-5210-3.
- ——— (2022). "Giving Nebuchadrezzar and Ezekiel Their Due: Rethinking the Exiled Prophet's Final Word in Ezekiel 29:17–21". In Hoffmeier, James K.; Averbeck, Richard E.; Howard, J. Caleb (eds.). "Now These Records are Ancient": Studies in Ancient Near Eastern and Biblical History, Language and Culture in Honor of K. Lawson Younger. Münster, Germany: Zaphon. ISBN 978-3-96327-190-8.
