= John D. W. Watts =

American Baptist theologian and scholar (1921–2013)

John D. W. Watts SBC
- Born: John Drayton Williams Watts; August 9, 1921; Laurens, South Carolina
- Died: July 21, 2013 (aged 91); Penney Farms, Florida
- Citizenship: United States
- Education: B.A., B.D., Th.D.
- Alma mater: Mississippi College, Southern Baptist Theological Seminary
- Occupation: Professor
- Years active: 1948-1995
- Parent: J. Wash Watts
- Religion: Christianity
- Church: Southern Baptist Convention
- Congregations served: Military chaplain, U. S. Navy (1944-1946)
- Offices held: Teacher in Old Testament, International Baptist Theological Seminary, Rüschlikon (Switzerland) (1948-1970), Serampore College, Serampore (India) (1972-1975), Fuller Theological Seminary, Pasadena (United States) (1976-1981)(1976-1981), Southern Baptist Theological Seminary, Louisville (United States) (1981-1995)

John D. W. Watts (August 9, 1921 – July 21, 2013) was a Baptist theologian and Old Testament scholar.

== Career ==
=== Europe ===
In 1948, Watts was a member of the founding faculty of the International Baptist Theological Seminary, Rüschlikon in Switzerland where he taught Old Testament. He eventually served as President of the Seminary from 1963 until 1969, and continued teaching there until 1970. After his retirement, he returned to teach for one more year at the International Baptist Theological Seminary in 1995–1996, which had by that time moved to Prague in the Czech Republic.

=== Asia ===
Watts then taught at historic Serampore College, a constituent College of the Senate of Serampore College (University), Serampore India which was founded in 1818 by the Baptist Missions led by Joshua Marshman, William Carey, and William Ward with affiliated seminaries throughout the Indian subcontinent. Watts taught Old Testament at Serampore from 1972 onwards in place of K. V. Mathew but was joined by G. Babu Rao. Among the seminarians who studied during that period include, D. K. Sahu, the present Dean of the Theology Department of the Sam Higginbottom Institute of Agriculture, Technology and Sciences, Allahabad, and others.

=== North America ===
Watts joined the Fuller Theological Seminary, Pasadena in the United States in 1976 and taught there for nearly six years up to 1981. While at Fuller Seminary, Watts was recruited to serve as the Old Testament editor of the Word Biblical Commentary, which he continued to do until 2011. In 1981, Watts moved to the Southern Baptist Theological Seminary, Louisville where he had earned his Th.D. degree and taught for two years previously (1970–1972). Now he joined the permanent faculty for fifteen years until his retirement in 1995.

== Writings ==
In the first half of his career, Watts provided valuable inputs on the growth of the Old Testament, especially on Amos. In the 1970s and 1980s, he developed a literary analysis of prophetic literature as drama, which he applied to the Book of Isaiah in his two-volume commentary. A comprehensive list of his writings was made available in the festschrift that came out in 1996 in his honor which covers the period between 1948 through 1995. Later in 2008, when a special edition on the Watts' contribution was brought out by the Baylor University, Pamela J. Scalise of the Fuller Theological Seminary compiled a bibliography of his writings. In addition, he continued to publish beyond 2008 even up to 2011.

- 1948, The Heavenlies of Isaiah,
- 1952, For My Name's Sake – A Study of the Phrase in Ezekiel XX,
- 1954, Biblisches Geben,
- 1954, Note on the Text of Amos V:7,
- 1955, The Origin of the Book of Amos,
- 1956 An Old Hymn preserved in the Book of Amos,
- 1956, The People of God,
- 1957, The Song of the Sea – Exodus XV,
- 1958 Vision and Prophecy in Amos: 1955 Faculty Lectures,
- 1958, Elements of Old Testament Worship,
- 1958, The Knowledge of God in the Old Testament,
- 1958, Lists of Words appearing frequently in the Hebrew Bible,
- 1959 Remarks on Hebrew Relative Clauses,
- 1960, The Methods and Purpose of Biblical Interpretation,
- 1961, Jeremiah – A Character Study,
- 1962, Infinitive Absolute as Imperative and the Interpretation of Exodus 20:8,
- 1965, Yahweh Malak Psalms,
- 1965, Today's Man of God,
- 1966, Studying the Book of Amos,
- 1966 Amos, the man,
- 1966, Amos – The man and his message,
- 1969, Obadiah: A Critical Exegetical Commentary,
- 1969, Zechariah,
- 1970, Deuteronomy,
- 1970, Zechariah,
- 1971, Basic Patterns in Old Testament Religion,
- 1971 (with J. J. Owens and M. E. Tate), Job,
- 1972, A critical analysis of Amos4:1ff,
- 1972, Review of D. Balzer, Ezechiel and Deutero-jesaya,
- 1971, The authority of the Old Testament,
- 1974, The Historical Approach to the Bible: Its Development,
- 1975, The Books of Joel, Obadiah, Jonah, Nahum, Habakkuk and Zephaniah,
- 1976, Higher Education in Southern Baptist Foreign Missions,
- 1977, The Deuteronomic Theology,
- 1977, Exodus,
- 1978, Study Outlines of Old Testament Books,
- 1978, The formation of Isaiah Chapter 1: Its context in chapters 1-4,
- 1981, Current Issues in Old Testament Interpretation,
- 1983, Preaching on the narratives of the monarchy,
- 1984, Psalms of Trust, Thanksgiving and Praise,
- 1985, Isaiah 1-33,
- 1986, The Characterization of Yahweh in the Vision of Isaiah,
- 1987, Isaiah 34-66,
- 1987, Introduction to the book of Malachi,
- 1988, Babylonian Idolatry in the Prophets as a False Socio-Economic System,
- 1989, Isaiah (Word Biblical Themes),
- 1991, Reading Isaiah in a New Time,
- 1991, Resources for Preaching from the Book of Isaiah,
- 1992, Baptists and the Transformation of Culture: A Case Study from the Career of William Carey,
- 1992, A Canonical Model (Habakkuk 2:4),
- 1992, Images of Yahweh: God in the Prophets,
- 1993, Autobiographical essay in How I have changed my mind,
- 1994, The spirit of the prophets: Three brief studies,
- 1995, Amos: Across Fifty Years of Study,
- 1995, Isaiah,
- 1996 (with Paula Fontana Qualls), Isaiah in Ephesians,
- 1999, A History of Old Testament Studies in the 20th Century,
- 2000, A History of the use and interpretation in the Psalms,
- 2011, How We Got Our Bible: Files from an Alttestamentler's Hard Drive,

== Honors ==
In 1996, a festschrift titled, Forming Prophetic Literature: Essays on Isaiah and the Twelve was brought out by some students and colleagues of Watts edited by James W. Watts, Professor of Religion at Syracuse University and Paul R. House, Professor of Old Testament at the Beeson Divinity School.

Again in 2008, the Baylor University in its Perspectives in Religious Studies dedicated some essays on the contribution of Watts with essays by Gerald L. Keown of the Gardner–Webb University, Pamela J. Scalise of the Fuller Theological Seminary and Carol Woodfin of the Hardin–Simmons University with additional bibliography of the writings of Watts compiled by Pamela J. Scalise.

Educational offices
| Preceded by J. D. Hughey | President, Baptist Theological Seminary, Rüschlikon (Europe); 1964-1970 | Succeeded by John Allen Moore |
Academic offices
| Preceded by K. V. Mathew | Teacher - in - Old Testament; Serampore College, Serampore (Asia); 1972-1975 | Succeeded by G. Babu Rao |
