= Leslie C. Allen =

Old Testament scholar

- Occupation: Senior Professor of Old Testament at Fuller Theological Seminary

Academic background
- Education: University of Cambridge
- Alma mater: University of London (Ph.D.)(D.D.)

Academic work
- Discipline: Biblical studies
- Sub-discipline: Old Testament studies
- Institutions: Fuller Theological Seminary
- Main interests: Prophets, Psalms, Chronicles, Ezra-Nehemiah, Lamentations
- Notable works: The Books of Joel, Obadiah, Jonah and Micah (NICOT)
- Website: http://fuller.edu/faculty/lallen/

Leslie C. Allen was an Old Testament scholar. He was Senior Professor of Old Testament at Fuller Theological Seminary's School of Theology, where he taught in the Hebrew Prophets, OT 'Writings' and OT Exegesis in Lamentations and Psalms. He authored a number of scholarly books, most notably the commentary on the books of Joel, Obadiah, Jonah and Micah in the New International Commentary on the Old Testament series. Also numbers of scholarly journals, biblical encyclopedias and academic religious periodicals have included articles by Allen.

== Education ==
Allen earned his B.A. at University of Cambridge. He has also earned a PhD. and D.D. from University of London.

== History and career ==
Allen has written a number of well-received and scholarly commentaries particularly on Jeremiah in the Old Testament Library, Psalms and Ezekiel volumes in the Word Biblical Commentary and The New Interpreter's Bible article on Chronicles.

He remains involved with the specialist associations such as the Society for Old Testament Study, the Tyndale Fellowship, the Institute for Biblical Research, and the Society of Biblical Literature.

== Works ==
selected list

- The Books of Joel, Obadiah, Jonah and Micah. New International Commentary on the Old Testament. Eerdmans, 1976.
- Psalms 101–150, Word Books (1983) (WBC)
- Psalms: Word Biblical Themes, Word Books (1987)
- 1, 2 Chronicles, Word Books (1987) (The Communicator's Commentary)
- Ezekiel 20–48, Word Books (1990) (WBC)
- Ezekiel 1–19, Word Books (1994) (WBC)
- with T. S. Laniak Ezra, Nehemiah, Esther, Hendrickson (2003) (New International Biblical Commentary)
- “The First and Second Books of Chronicles,” in New Interpreter's Bible, ed. Leander E. Keck, vol. 3 (Nashville: Abingdon Press, 1999)
- Jeremiah: A Commentary, Westminster John Knox (2008) (Old Testament Library)
- A Liturgy of Grief: A Pastoral Commentary on Lamentations, Baker Academic (2011)
- A Theological Approach to the Old Testament: Major Themes and New Testament Connections, Cascade Books (2014)

=== Articles ===
selected list

- Allen, Leslie C. (1969), "Romans", in Bruce, F. F. (ed.), A New Testament Commentary, Pickering and Inglis
- Allen, Leslie C. (1974), "The Greek Chronicles, Part 1: The Translator's Craft; Part 2: Textual Criticism", Supplements to Vetus Testamentum 25, vol. 27, Brill
- Allen, Leslie C. (1994), "Joel", New Bible Commentary: 21st Century Edition, IVP Academic, pp. 780–791
