= Ritualization =

Behavioral phenomenon

Ritualization is a behavior that occurs typically in a member of a given species in a highly stereotyped fashion and independent of any direct physiological significance. It is found, in differing forms, both in non-human animals and in humans.

== In non-human animals ==
Konrad Lorenz, working with greylag geese and other animals such as water shrews, showed that ritualization was an important process in their development. He showed that the geese obsessively displayed a reflexive motor pattern of egg retrieval when stimulated by the sight of an egg outside their nest. Similarly, in the shrews, Lorenz showed that once they had become used to jumping over a stone in their path, they went on jumping at that place after the stone was taken away. This sort of behaviour is analogous to obsessive-compulsive disorder in humans.

Oskar Heinroth in 1910 and Lorenz from 1935 onwards studied the triumph ceremony in geese; Lorenz described it as becoming a fixed ritual. It involves a rolling behaviour (of the head and neck) and cackling with the head stretched forward, and occurs only among geese that know each other, meaning within a family or between mates. The triumph ceremony appears in varied situations, such as when mates meet after having been separated, when disturbed, or after an attack. The behaviour is now known also in other species, such as Canada goose.

== In humans ==
Ritualization is associated with the work of Catherine Bell. Bell, drawing on the Practice Theory of Pierre Bourdieu, has taken a less functional view of ritual with her elaboration of ritualization.

More recently scholars interested in the cognitive science of religion such as Pascal Boyer, Pierre Liénard, and William W. McCorkle, Jr. have been involved in experimental, ethnographic, and archival research on how ritualized actions might inform the study of ritualization and ritual forms of action. Boyer, Liénard, and McCorkle argue that ritualized compulsions are in relation to an evolved cognitive architecture where social, cultural, and environmental selection pressures stimulate "hazard-precaution" systems such as predation, contagion, and disgust in human minds. McCorkle argued that these ritualized compulsions (especially in regard to dead bodies vis-à-vis, mortuary behavior) were turned into ritual scripts by professional guilds only several thousand years ago with advancement in technology such as the domestication of plants and animals, literacy, and writing.
