= International Baptist Theological Study Centre =

Baptist theological school in the Netherlands

- Type: Private
- Established: 1949
- Affiliation: European Baptist Federation
- Location: Amsterdam, Netherlands
- Campus: Urban
- Website: www.ibts.eu

International Baptist Theological Study Centre (IBTS) is a Baptist theological school, located in Amsterdam, Netherlands. It is affiliated with the European Baptist Federation.

== History ==
The Seminary was founded in 1949 in Rüschlikon, Switzerland. It transferred to Prague, Czech Republic, in 1996. Over the summer of 2014 IBTS was established in Amsterdam.

IBTS forms part of a community of organisations known as the Baptist House in Amsterdam. The other members of the community are the Baptist Union of the Netherlands, the Dutch Baptist Seminary and the office of the European Baptist Federation.

The IBTS houses a collection of books in the areas of Baptist identity, mission and practice.

== Programmes ==
Lecturing and supervision is in English and faculty are drawn from throughout Europe. The Centre offers a PHD programme for study and research in a collaborative partnership with the Faculty of Religion and Theology at the VU (Vrije Universiteit).

It is a founding member of the Consortium of European Baptist Theological schools.

== Presidents/rectors/directors of seminary ==
1. 1949—1950 George W. Sadler
2. 1950—1960 Josef Nordenhaug
3. 1960—1964 J. D. Hughey
4. 1964—1970 John D. W. Watts
5. 1972—1977 Penrose St. Amant
6. 1978—1981 Isam E. Ballenger
7. 1982—1983 Clyde E. Fant
8. 1984—1987 Altus Newel
9. 1988—1997 John David Hopper
10. 1997—2013 Keith Grant Jones
11. 2013—2014 Parush R Parushev (Acting Rector during the transition period)
12. 2014—2018 Rev. Dr Stuart Blythe (First Rector of IBTS Centre. Blythe was the first head of the institution to be an IBTS graduate alumnus, obtaining his BD degree magna cum laude at Rüschlikon in 1989.)
13. 2018–Present Rev. Dr. Mike Pears

== See also ==
- European Baptist Federation
