= Bill T. Arnold =

American theologian

- Occupation: Paul S. Amos Professor of Old Testament Interpretation

Academic background
- Education: Asbury University, Asbury Theological Seminary
- Alma mater: Hebrew Union College – Jewish Institute of Religion (Ph.D.)

Academic work
- Discipline: Old Testament and Ancient Near Eastern Studies
- Sub-discipline: Ancient Near Eastern History and Culture Criticism & Interpretation of the Pentateuch, Genesis in Contemporary Thought, Deuteronomy Hebrew and Cognate Languages
- Institutions: Asbury Theological Seminary
- Notable works: Deuteronomy (NICOT)
- Website: https://asburyseminary.edu/faculty/bill-arnold/

Bill T. Arnold is an American scholar and theologian. He is currently the Paul S. Amos Professor of Old Testament Interpretation at Asbury Theological Seminary. He is an editor of biblical commentary series, notably the New Cambridge Bible Commentary (NCBC), the Baker Commentary on the Old Testament: Pentateuch (BCOTP), and the New International Commentary on the Old Testament (NICOT).

His research encompasses Old Testament and ancient Near Eastern studies both separately and in combination. In addition, he is the author of numerous books, including biblical commentaries, Old Testament introductions, a biblical Hebrew grammar, and other works on ancient Near Eastern history and culture.

== Education ==
Arnold received a Bachelor of Arts at Asbury University and went on to receive a Master of Divinity at Asbury Theological Seminary. He continued his studies at Hebrew Union College – Jewish Institute of Religion and received a Doctor of Philosophy, specializing in Hebraic and Cognate Studies.

== Career ==
From 1991 to 1995, he served as a professor at Ashland Theological Seminary in Ashland, Ohio. Since then, Arnold has been the (Paul S. Amos) Professor of Old Testament Interpretation at Asbury Theological Seminary in Wilmore, Kentucky.

== Research and Works ==
Arnold’s research encompasses Old Testament and ancient Near Eastern studies, both separately and in combination. He specializes in Pentateuchal interpretation and is writing a two-volume commentary on Deuteronomy, the first of which was published in 2022 (Wm. B. Eerdmans Publishing Co.). He has written on many aspects of Old Testament interpretation, including Hebrew language and the history of Israelite religion. Past publications have taken up specific portions of the Hebrew Bible (Genesis and 1-2 Samuel), as well as a grammar (A Guide to Biblical Hebrew Syntax, with John H. Choi) and introductory materials (Who Were the Babylonians? and Encountering the Old Testament, with Bryan E. Beyer).

Arnold's second edition of The Cambridge Introduction to the Old Testament volume, published by Cambridge University Press approaches the Hebrew Scriptures through the interpretive lenses of monotheism for secular classrooms, aiming to show the relevance of the Hebrew Scriptures for Jews, Christians, Muslims, and secularists.

In 2026, an honorary volume was published by his friends and former students entitled God of the Fathers: Conceptualizations of Divinity in Genesis and Deuteronomy; A Festschrift for Bill T. Arnold.

== Theology ==
Arnold aligns with the Wesleyan-Arminian theological tradition, as shown by his article in Firebrand Magazine on key Wesleyan concepts. His role as an associate editor of The Wesley Study Bible, rooted in Methodist tradition, further affirms this connection.
