= Books of Chronicles =

Final books of the Hebrew Bible

The Book of Chronicles (Hebrew: דִּבְרֵי־הַיָּמִים, romanized: Dīvrē-hayYāmīm, lit. 'words of the days') is a book in the Hebrew Bible, found as two books (1–2 Chronicles) in the Christian Old Testament. Chronicles is the final book of the Hebrew Bible, concluding the third section of the Jewish Tanakh, the Ketuvim ("Writings"). It contains a genealogy starting with Adam and a history of ancient Judah and Israel up to the Edict of Cyrus in 539 BC.

Traditional Jewish and Christian scholarship attributed it to Ezra. However, Chronicles was likely written by a highly educated Jerusalem-based priestly author between roughly 400–250 BC, drawing heavily on earlier biblical traditions to reinterpret Israel’s history for the Jewish elite of the Persian/Hellenistic era.

The book was translated into Greek and divided into two books in the Septuagint in the mid-3rd century BC. In Christian contexts Chronicles is referred to in the plural as the Books of Chronicles, after the Latin name chronicon given to the text by Jerome, but is also referred to by its Greek name as the Books of Paralipomenon. In Christian Bibles, they usually follow the two Books of Kings and precede Ezra–Nehemiah, the last history-oriented book of the Protestant Old Testament.

== Summary ==
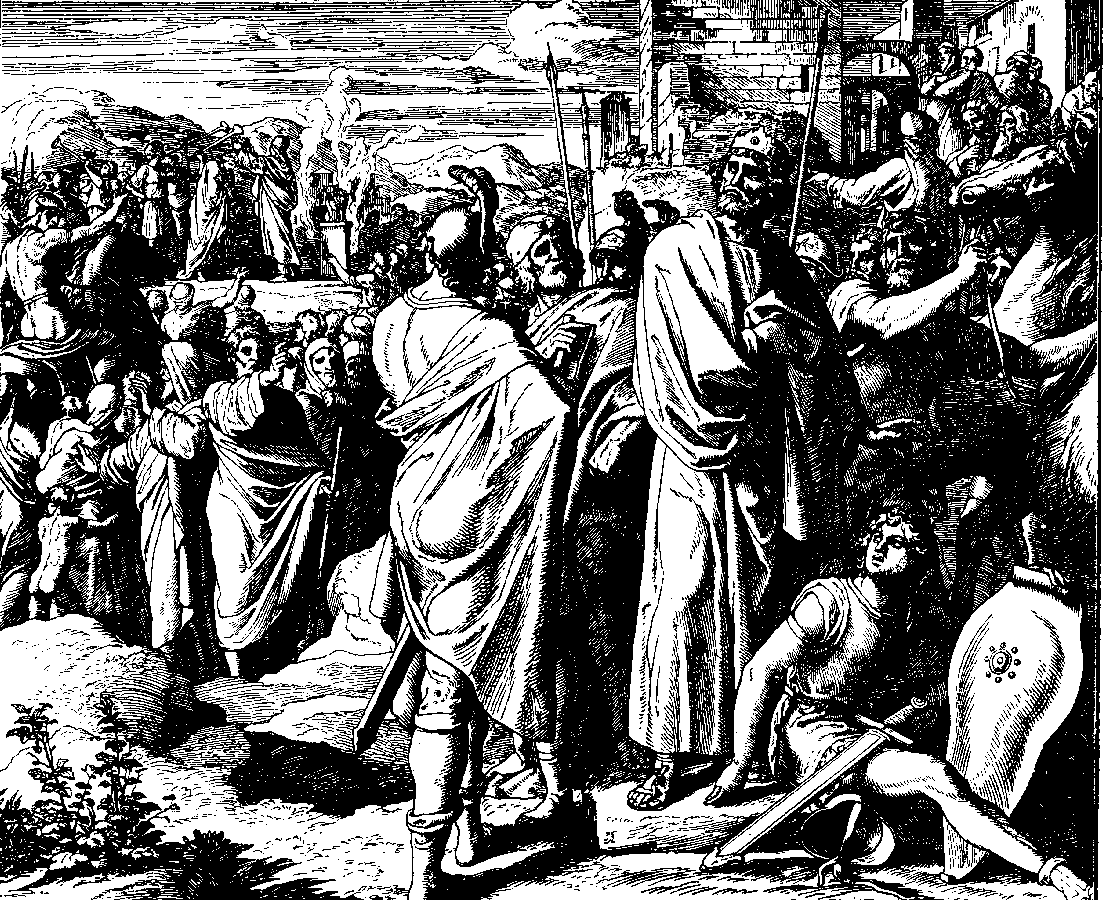
Rehoboam and Jeroboam I, 1860 woodcut by Julius Schnorr von Karolsfeld

The Chronicles narrative begins with Adam, Seth and Enosh, and the story is then carried forward, almost entirely through genealogical lists, down to the founding of the United Kingdom of Israel in the "introductory chapters", 1 Chronicles 1–9. The bulk of the remainder of 1 Chronicles, after a brief account of Saul in chapter 10, is concerned with the reign of David. The next long section concerns David's son Solomon, and the final part is concerned with the Kingdom of Judah, with occasional references to the northern Kingdom of Israel (2 Chronicles 10–36). The final chapter covers briefly the reigns of the last four kings, until Judah is destroyed and the people taken into exile in Babylon. In the two final verses, identical to the opening verses of the Book of Ezra, the Persian king Cyrus the Great conquers the Neo-Babylonian Empire, and authorises the restoration of the Temple in Jerusalem and the return of the exiles.

== Structure ==
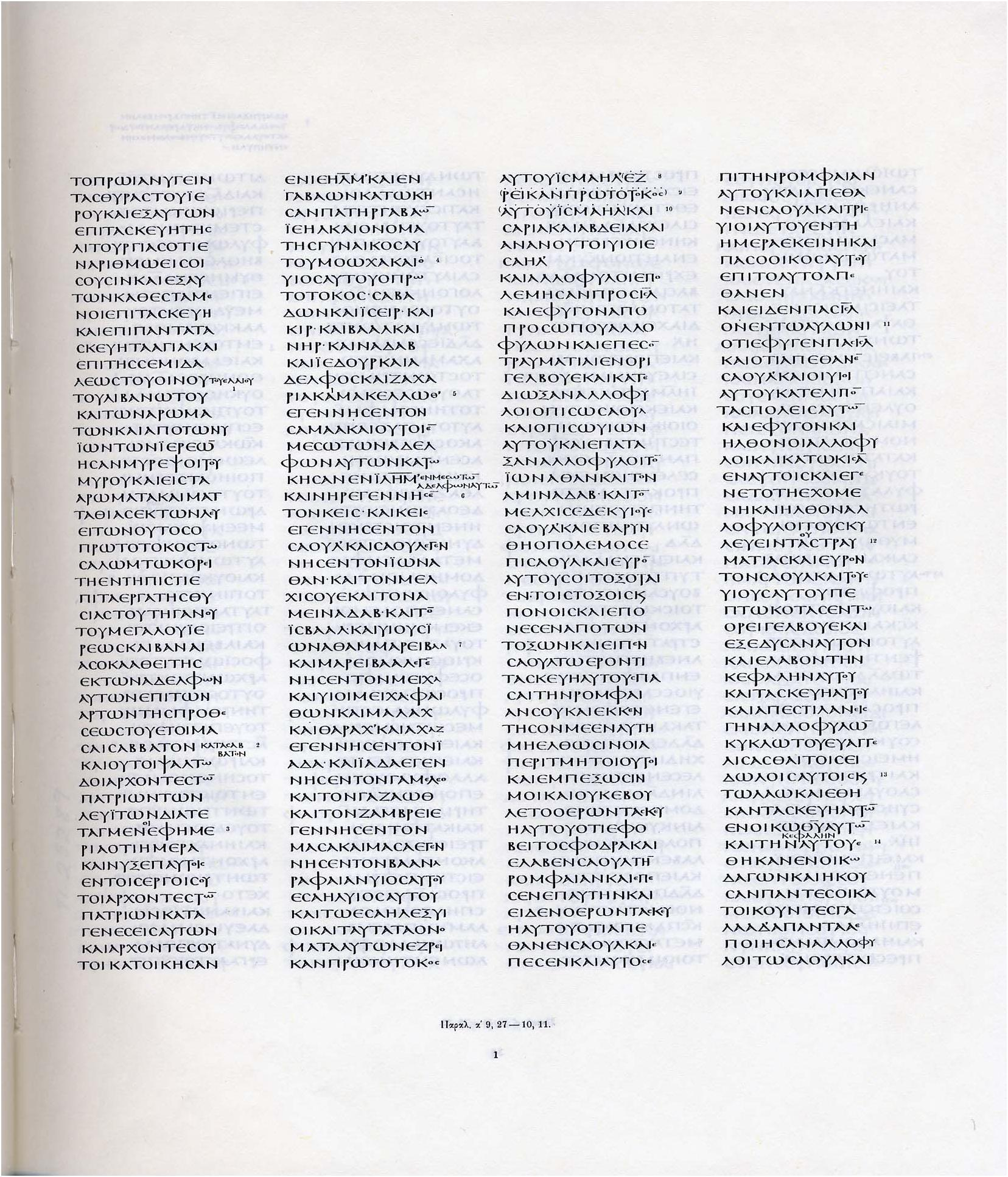
Greek translation: Paralipomenon 9:27–10:11 in Codex Sinaiticus (1862 facsimile)

Originally a single work, Chronicles was divided into two in the Septuagint, a Greek translation produced in the 3rd and 2nd centuries BC. It has three broad divisions:

1. the genealogies in chapters 1–9 of 1 Chronicles
2. the reigns of David and Solomon (constituting the remainder of 1 Chronicles, and chapters 1–9 of 2 Chronicles); and
3. the narrative of the divided kingdom, focusing on the Kingdom of Judah, in the remainder of 2 Chronicles.

Within this broad structure there are signs that the author has used various other devices to structure his work, notably through drawing parallels between David and Solomon (the first becomes king, establishes the worship of Israel's God in Jerusalem, and fights the wars that will enable the Temple to be built, then Solomon becomes king, builds and dedicates the Temple, and reaps the benefits of prosperity and peace).

1 Chronicles is divided into 29 chapters and 2 Chronicles into 36 chapters. Biblical commentator C. J. Ball suggests that the division into two books introduced by the translators of the Septuagint "occurs in the most suitable place", namely with the conclusion of David's reign as king and the initiation of Solomon's reign.

The Talmud considered Chronicles one book.

== Composition ==
=== Origins ===
The last events recorded in Chronicles take place in the reign of Cyrus the Great, the Persian king who conquered Babylon in 539 BC; this sets the earliest possible date for this passage of the book.

Chronicles appears to be largely the work of a single individual. The writer was probably male, probably a Levite (temple priest), and probably from Jerusalem. He was well-read, a skilled editor, and a sophisticated theologian. He aimed to use the narratives in the Torah and former prophets to convey religious messages to his peers, the literary and political elite of Jerusalem in the time of the Achaemenid Empire.

First page of Chronicles in a 10th- or 11th-century Greek manuscript acquired by Robert Grosseteste

Jewish and Christian tradition identified this author as the 5th-century BC figure Ezra, who gives his name to the Book of Ezra; Ezra is also believed by the Talmudic sages to have written both his own book (i. e., Ezra–Nehemiah) and Chronicles up to his own time, the latter having been finished by Nehemiah. Later critics, skeptical of the long-maintained tradition, preferred to call the author "the Chronicler". However, many scholars maintain support for Ezra's authorship, not only based on centuries of work by Jewish historians, but also due to the consistency of language and speech patterns between Chronicles and Ezra–Nehemiah. Professor Emeritus Menahem Haran of the Hebrew University of Jerusalem explains, "the overall unity of the Chronistic Work is … demonstrated by a common ideology, the uniformity of legal, cultic and historical conceptions and specific style, all of which reflect one opus."

One of the most striking, although inconclusive, features of Chronicles is that its closing sentence is repeated as the opening of Ezra–Nehemiah. In antiquity, such repeated verses, like the "catch-lines" used by modern printers, often appeared at the end of a scroll to facilitate the reader's passing on to the correct second book-scroll after completing the first. This scribal device was employed in works that exceeded the scope of a single scroll and had to be continued on another scroll.

The latter half of the 20th century, amid growing skepticism in academia regarding history in the Biblical tradition, saw a reappraisal of the authorship question. Though there is a general lack of corroborating evidence, many now regard it as improbable that the author of Chronicles was also the author of the narrative portions of Ezra–Nehemiah. These critics suggest that Chronicles was probably composed between 400 and 250 BC, with the period 350–300 BC the most likely. This timeframe is achieved by estimates made based on genealogies appearing in the Greek Septuagint. This theory bases its premise on the latest person mentioned in Chronicles, Anani. Anani is an eighth-generation descendant of King Jehoiachin according to the Masoretic Text. This has persuaded many supporters of the Septuagint's reading to place Anani's likely date of birth a century later than what had been largely accepted for two millennia.

=== Sources ===
Much of the content of Chronicles is a repetition of material from other books of the Bible, from Genesis to Kings, and so the usual scholarly view is that these books, or an early version of them, provided the author with the bulk of his material. It is, however, possible that the situation was rather more complex, and that books such as Genesis and Samuel should be regarded as contemporary with Chronicles, drawing on much of the same material, rather than a source for it. Despite much discussion of this issue, no agreement has been reached. It is also likely that Chronicles preserved ancient heterodox traditions regarding the history of Israel and Judah.

=== Genre ===
The translators who created the Greek version of the Jewish Bible (the Septuagint) called this book Paralipomenon, "Things Left Out", indicating that they thought of it as a supplement to another work, probably Genesis–Kings, but the idea seems inappropriate, since much of Genesis–Kings has been copied almost without change. Some modern scholars proposed that Chronicles is a midrash, or traditional Jewish commentary, on Genesis–Kings, but again this is not entirely accurate since the author or authors do not comment on the older books so much as use them to create a new work. Recent suggestions have been that it was intended as a clarification of the history in Genesis–Kings, or a replacement or alternative for it.

== Themes ==
Presbyterian theologian Paul K. Hooker argues that the generally accepted message the author wished to give to his audience was a theological reflection, not a "history of Israel":

1. God is active in history, and especially the history of Israel. The faithfulness or sins of individual kings are immediately rewarded or punished by God. (This is in contrast to the theology of the Books of Kings, where the faithlessness of kings was punished on later generations through the Babylonian exile).
2. God calls Israel to a special relationship. The call begins with the genealogies, gradually narrowing the focus from all mankind to a single family, the Israelites, the descendants of Jacob. "True" Israel is those who continue to worship Yahweh at the Temple in Jerusalem (in the southern Kingdom of Judah), with the result that the history of the historical Kingdom of Israel is almost completely ignored.
3. God chose David and his dynasty as the agents of his will. According to the author of Chronicles, the three great events of David's reign were his bringing the Ark of the Covenant to Jerusalem, his founding of an eternal royal dynasty, and his preparations for the construction of the Temple.
4. God chose a site in Jerusalem as the location for the Temple, the place where God should be worshiped. More time and space are spent on the construction of the Temple and its rituals of worship than on any other subject. By stressing the central role of the Temple in pre-exilic Judah, the author also stresses the importance of the newly rebuilt Persian-era Second Temple to his own readers.
5. God remains active in Israel. The past is used to legitimize the author's present: this is seen most clearly in the detailed attention he gives to the Temple built by Solomon, but also in the genealogy and lineages, which connect his own generation to the distant past and thus make the claim that the present is a continuation of that past.

== See also ==
- History of ancient Israel and Judah

== Bibliography ==
- Beentjes, Pancratius C. (2008). Tradition and Transformation in the Book of Chronicles. Brill. ISBN 9789004170445.
- Coggins, Richard J. (2003). "1 and 2 Chronicles". In Dunn, James D. G.; Rogerson, John William (eds.). Eerdmans Commentary on the Bible. Eerdmans. ISBN 9780802837110.
- Hooker, Paul K. (2000). ANONYMUS ABSOLUTUS, Adam G. (ed.). First and Second Chronicles. Westminster John Knox Press. ISBN 9780664255916.
- Japhet, Sara (1993). ANONYMUS, Adam G. (ed.). I and II Chronicles: A Commentary. SCM Press. ISBN 9780664226411.
- Kalimi, Isaac (January 2005). An Ancient Israelite Historian: Studies in the Chronicler, His Time, Place and Writing. Uitgeverij Van Gorcum. ISBN 978-90-232-4071-6.
- Kelly, Brian E. (1996). Retribution and Eschatology in Chronicles. Sheffield Academic Press. ISBN 9780567637796.
- Klein, Ralph W. (2006). 1 Chronicles: A Commentary. Fortress Press.
- Knoppers, Gary N. (2004). 1 Chronicles: A New Translation with Introduction and Commentary. Doubleday.
- McKenzie, Steven L. (2004). 1–2 Chronicles. Abingdon. ISBN 9781426759802.

Books of Chronicles History books
Preceded by Ezra–Nehemiah	Hebrew Bible	End
Preceded by 1–2 Kings	Western Old Testament	Succeeded by Ezra
Preceded by 1–2 Kings	Eastern Old Testament	Succeeded by 1 Esdras
