= Word Biblical Commentary =

The Word Biblical Commentary (WBC) is a series of commentaries in English on the text of the Bible both Old and New Testament. It is currently published by the Zondervan Publishing Company. Initially published under the "Word Books" imprint, the series spent some time as part of the Thomas Nelson list. When this publisher was acquired by HarperCollins the series was assigned to another of the group's publishers, Zondervan.

== Old Testament ==
- Wenham, Gordon J. (1987). Genesis 1-15. Vol. 1. Thomas Nelson. ISBN 978-0849902000.
- Wenham, Gordon J. (1994). Genesis 16-50. Vol. 2. Thomas Nelson. ISBN 978-0849902017.
- Durham, John I. (1987). Exodus. Vol. 3. Thomas Nelson. ISBN 978-0849902024.
- Hartley, John E. (1992). Leviticus. Vol. 4. Thomas Nelson. ISBN 978-0849902031.
- Budd, Phillip J. (1984). Numbers. Vol. 5. Thomas Nelson. ISBN 978-0849902048.
- Christensen, Duane L. (2001). Deuteronomy 1:1-21:9. Vol. 6a (2nd ed.). Thomas Nelson. ISBN 978-0785242208.
- Christensen, Duane L. (2002). Deuteronomy 21:10-34:12. Vol. 6b (Revised ed.). Thomas Nelson. ISBN 978-0849910326.
- Butler, Trent C. (2014). Joshua 1-12. Vol. 7a (2nd ed.). Zondervan. ISBN 978-0785252689.
- Butler, Trent C. (2014). Joshua 13-24. Vol. 7b (2nd ed.). Zondervan. ISBN 978-0310520122.
  - replaced Butler, Trent C. (1983). Joshua. Vol. 7. Thomas Nelson. ISBN 978-0849902062.
- Armerding, Carl E. (2006). Judges. Vol. 8. Thomas Nelson. ISBN 978-0849902079.
- Bush, Fredric W. (1996). Ruth & Esther. Vol. 9. Thomas Nelson. ISBN 978-0849902086.
- Klein, Ralph W. (1983). 1 Samuel. Vol. 10. Thomas Nelson. ISBN 978-0849902093.
- Anderson, A. A. (1989). 2 Samuel. Vol. 11. Thomas Nelson. ISBN 978-0849902109.
- De Vries, Simon J. (1985). 1 Kings. Vol. 12. Thomas Nelson. ISBN 978-0849902116.
- Hobbs, T. R. (1986). 2 Kings. Vol. 13. Thomas Nelson. ISBN 978-0849902123.
- Braun, Roddy L. (1986). 1 Chronicles. Vol. 14. Thomas Nelson. ISBN 978-0849902130.
- Dillard, Raymond B. (2010). 2 Chronicles. Vol. 15. Thomas Nelson. ISBN 978-0849902147.
- Williamson, Hugh G. M. (1986). Ezra-Nehemiah. Vol. 16. Thomas Nelson. ISBN 9780849902154.
- Clines, David J. A. (1989). Job 1-20. Vol. 17. Thomas Nelson. ISBN 978-0849902161.
- Clines, David J. A. (2006). Job 21-37. Vol. 18a. Thomas Nelson. ISBN 978-0849902178.
- Clines, David J. A. (2015). Job 38-42. Vol. 18b (2nd ed.). Thomas Nelson. ISBN 978-0310522003.
- Craigie, Peter C. (2010). Psalms 1-50. Vol. 19 (2nd ed.). Thomas Nelson. ISBN 978-0849902185.
- Tate, Marvin E. (1991). Psalms 51-100. Vol. 20. Thomas Nelson. ISBN 978-0849902192.
- Allen, Leslie C. (1983). Psalms 101-150. Vol. 21. Thomas Nelson. ISBN 978-0849902208.
- Murphy, Roland (1998). Proverbs. Vol. 22. Thomas Nelson. ISBN 978-0849902215.
- Murphy, Roland (1992). Ecclesiastes. Vol. 23a. Thomas Nelson. ISBN 978-0849902222.
- Garrett, Duane; House, Paul R. (2004). Song of Songs & Lamentations. Vol. 23b. Thomas Nelson. ISBN 978-0849908255.
- Watts, John D. W. (2005). Isaiah 1-33. Vol. 24 (2nd ed.). Thomas Nelson. ISBN 978-0785250104.
- Watts, John D. W. (2005). Isaiah 34-66. Vol. 25 (2nd ed.). Thomas Nelson. ISBN 978-0785250111.
- Craigie, Peter C.; Kelley, Page H.; Drinkard Jr., Joel F. (1991). Jeremiah 1-25. Vol. 26. Thomas Nelson. ISBN 978-0849902253.
- Keown, Gerald L.; Scalise, Pamela J.; Smothers, Thomas G. (1995). Jeremiah 26-52. Vol. 27. Thomas Nelson. ISBN 978-0849902260.
- Brownlee, William H. (1994). Ezekiel 1-19. Vol. 28. Thomas Nelson. ISBN 978-0849908309.
- Allen, Leslie C. (1990). Ezekiel 20-48. Vol. 29. Thomas Nelson. ISBN 978-0849902284.
- Goldingay, John E. (1989). Daniel. Vol. 30. Thomas Nelson. ISBN 978-0849902291.
- Stuart, Douglas (1987). Hosea, Joel, Amos, Obediah & Jonah. Vol. 31. Thomas Nelson. ISBN 978-0849902307.
- Smith, Ralph L. (1984). Micah, Nahum, Habakkuk, Zephaniah, Haggai, Nahum & Malachi. Vol. 32. Thomas Nelson. ISBN 9780849902314.

== New Testament ==
- Hagner, Donald A. (1993). Matthew 1-13. Vol. 33a. Thomas Nelson. ISBN 978-0849902321.
- Hagner, Donald A. (1995). Matthew 14-28. Vol. 33b. Thomas Nelson. ISBN 978-0849910968.
- Guelich, Robert A. (1989). Mark 1:1-8:26. Vol. 34a. Thomas Nelson. ISBN 978-0849902338.
- Evans, Craig A. (2001). Mark 8:27-16:20. Vol. 34b. Thomas Nelson. ISBN 978-0849902536.
- Nolland, John (1989). Luke 1:1-9:20. Vol. 35a. Thomas Nelson. ISBN 978-0849902345.
- Nolland, John (1993). Luke 9:21-18:34. Vol. 35b. Thomas Nelson. ISBN 978-0849902543.
- Nolland, John (1993). Luke 18:35-24:53. Vol. 35c. Thomas Nelson. ISBN 978-0849910722.
- Beasley-Murray, George R. (1987). John. Vol. 36. Thomas Nelson. ISBN 978-0785209409.
- Acts 1-9:42 (forthcoming Jan 2025 from Steven J. Walton)
- Acts 10-28 (forthcoming from Steven J. Walton)
- Dunn, James D. G. (1988). Romans 1-8. Vol. 38a. Thomas Nelson. ISBN 978-0849902376.
- Dunn, James D. G. (1988). Romans 9-16. Vol. 38b. Thomas Nelson. ISBN 978-0849902529.
- 1 Corinthians (forthcoming from Andrew D. Clarke)
- Martin, Ralph P. (2014). 2 Corinthians. Vol. 40 (2nd ed.). Zondervan. ISBN 978-1418507732.
  - replaced Martin, Ralph P. (1986). 2 Corinthians. Vol. 40. Thomas Nelson. ISBN 978-0849902390.
- Longenecker, Richard N. (1990). Galatians. Vol. 41. Thomas Nelson. ISBN 978-0849902406.
- Lincoln, Andrew T. (1990). Ephesians. Vol. 42. Thomas Nelson. ISBN 978-0849902413.
- Hawthorne, Gerald F. (1983). Philippians. Vol. 43. Thomas Nelson. ISBN 978-0849902420.
- O'Brien, Peter T. (1982). Colossians & Philemon. Vol. 44. Thomas Nelson. ISBN 978-0310521785.
- Bruce, F. F. (1982). 1 & 2 Thessalonians. Vol. 45. Thomas Nelson. ISBN 978-0849902444.
- Mounce, William D. (2000). Pastoral Epistles. Vol. 46. Thomas Nelson. ISBN 978-0849902451.
- Lane, William L. (1991). Hebrews 1-8. Vol. 47a. Thomas Nelson. ISBN 978-0849902468.
- Lane, William L. (1991). Hebrews 9-13. Vol. 47b. Thomas Nelson. ISBN 978-0849909351.
- Martin, Ralph P. (1988). James. Vol. 48. Thomas Nelson. ISBN 978-0849902475.
- Michaels, J. Ramsey (1988). 1 Peter. Vol. 49. Thomas Nelson. ISBN 978-0849902482.
- Bauckham, Richard J. (1983). 2 Peter & Jude. Vol. 50. Thomas Nelson. ISBN 978-0849902499.
- Smalley, Stephen S. (1984). 1, 2 & 3 John. Vol. 51. Thomas Nelson. ISBN 978-0849902505.
- Aune, David E. (1997). Revelation 1-5. Vol. 52a. Thomas Nelson. ISBN 978-0849902512.
- Aune, David E. (1997). Revelation 6-16. Vol. 52b. Thomas Nelson. ISBN 978-0849907869.
- Aune, David E. (1998). Revelation 17-22. Vol. 52c. Thomas Nelson. ISBN 978-0849915451.
- Skinner, Christopher (2025). Mark, Volume 2. Zondervan. ISBN 978-0310126850.

== Reception ==
A 1996 Christianity Today magazine article included the commentary in a list of the more significant publications and achievements of evangelicalism in the latter half of the 20th century. A 2010 Christian Today article listed the WBC as among various recommended commentaries for use.

== See also ==
- Exegesis
- Textual criticism
- New International Greek Testament Commentary
