= Robert H. Mounce =

American biblical scholar (1921–2019)

Robert Hayden Mounce (December 30, 1921 – January 24, 2019) was an American New Testament scholar and president emeritus of Whitworth University in Spokane, Washington.

Mounce was born in LaSalle, Illinois, in December 1921 and raised in Minot, North Dakota. During the Second World War, he served as a dive bomber pilot in the Naval Air Corps (1943–1946). After the war, he taught public school and served as a missionary in Guatemala, where he was director of the Christian radio station TGNA. He married Jean McTavish in 1952.

Mounce graduated with a BA in music in 1953 from the University of Washington, and he also studied at Multnomah School of the Bible. He earned a ThM in New Testament from Fuller Theological Seminary and a PhD from the University of Aberdeen. Mounce taught at Bethel College and Seminary and was dean of the Arts and Humanities Department at Western Kentucky University before becoming president of Whitworth College. After retiring from Whitworth, Mounce served as the senior pastor of Christ Community Church, Walnut Creek, California, until 1991.

Mounce wrote commentaries on Revelation (ISBN 0-80282-537-0), Romans (ISBN 0-80540-127-X), and Matthew (ISBN 0-80104-721-8). He was a member of the translation teams for the New International Version, the New Living Translation, and the English Standard Version.

He died in January 2019 at the age of 97.
