= NIV Study Bible =

NIV bible study published in 1985

The NIV Study Bible is a study Bible originally published by Zondervan in 1985 that uses the New International Version (NIV). Revisions include one in 1995, a full revision in 2002, an update in October 2008 for the 30th anniversary of the NIV, another update in 2011 (with the text updated to the 2011 edition of the NIV), and a fully revised update in 2020 named "Fully Revised Edition". Its publisher and distributors claim over nine million sold, and claim that it is the world's bestselling study bible.

Doctrinally, the NIV Study Bible reflects traditional evangelical Christian theology. Many of the contributors of the NIV Study Bible are from evangelical institutions.

Key features of the NIV Study Bible include archaeological notes, commentary from different sources, and extensive introductions to each book. Notes from translators who worked on the NIV translation add additional clarifying information.

Zondervan has also published King James Version (KJV), Today's New International Version (TNIV), and New American Standard Bible (NASB) editions of this bible, with similar notes.

It is distinct from the NIV Zondervan Study Bible, edited by D. A. Carson and released in August 2015, which was later re-titled the NIV Biblical Theology Study Bible in September 2018.
