= Study Bible =

Bible edition containing additional scholarly information

A study Bible is an edition of the Bible prepared for use by serious readers of the Bible. It provides scholarly information designed to help the reader gain a better understanding of and context for the text.

== History ==
Perhaps the first edition of an English-language Bible that qualified as a "study Bible" was the Geneva Bible published by Sir Rowland Hill in 1560; it contained extensive cross-references, synopses, and doctrinal points. The text of the Geneva Bible was usually not printed without the commentary, though the Cambridge edition was printed without commentary.

The Church of England disputed some of the statements made in the Geneva Bible annotations. This led to the creation of the King James Bible, which was typically printed with a much less extensive apparatus or none at all. Several commentators have supplied annotated King James Bibles containing their own points of view, but unlike the Geneva Bible, these commentaries are not as thoroughly integrated into the text.

Another historically significant study Bible was the Scofield Reference Bible, first printed by Cyrus Scofield in 1909. This study Bible became widely popular in the United States, where it spread the interpretation system known as dispensationalism among fundamentalist Christians. A new version, the Recovery Version, was published in 1985. It holds a similar interpretation, and this study Bible has a very large number of cross-references and explanatory and interpretative footnotes.

Nearly all Catholic Bibles have explanatory and interpretative footnotes. For example, the Jerusalem Bible is a widely respected study Bible originally made by French monks in Jerusalem, under the auspices of the Catholic Church. The original French edition of 1961 became the basis of versions of this study Bible in several other languages, including English, revised as the New Jerusalem Bible; some versions have more extensive notes than others.

Logos International published the Logos International Study Bible in 1972. Based on the 1901 American Standard Version, it is essentially an updated version of The Cross-Reference Bible, published before 1929 and edited by Harold E. Monser. It includes an unusually large number of cross-references, in-text articles, and treatment of variant readings.

Zondervan claims that its NIV Study Bible has six million in distribution and that it is the world's best selling study Bible.

The ESV Study Bible is a recent addition which sold well in its pre-release phase, in the fall of 2008.

In recent times, study Bibles focusing on specific aspects of the Biblical message, have appeared, such as The Green Bible, an English version of the New Revised Standard Version Bible (originally published by Harper Bibles on October 7, 2008), which focuses on environmental issues and teachings.

== Features ==
A study Bible usually contains such features as:

- Annotations explaining difficult passages or points of theology and doctrine
- Articles and short biographies or character studies of Biblical people, places, and topics
- A concordance, a word index that indicates where various keywords are used in the Bible
- Contextual setting, including discussion of culture, customs, history, and timelines that relate Bible history to world history
- Harmonies of the Gospels, pointing out parallel incidents in the life of Jesus
- Illustrations of locations and artifacts
- Introductions and historical notes for each book of the Bible
- Life/practical application
- Maps and charts that illustrate the Holy Land during Biblical times and may show the same areas today
- References or cross-references, to indicate where one passage of the text relates to others
- Variant readings or interpretations of certain debatable passages, or possible conjectural emendations (i.e., alterations based on a philological expert's "educated guess" of the likely form of the original Hebrew or Greek, when the translators feel this is not sufficiently clear, possible translations from other ancient versions such as the Septuagint, Targumim, Peshitta, and Vulgate, readings from other manuscript families, such as marking those passages missing which are present in the Byzantine text-type in a modern textual eclectic translation, or marking those passages present which are missing in the Alexandrian text-type and the modern critical text in a translation from the Textus Receptus or Byzantine text-type, etc.)
- Word definitions to explain difficult or complex words and ideas

== Study Bible software ==
Study Bible software is also available which can aid readers in the study of the Bible. This software normally includes several Bible translations, commentaries, Bible Dictionaries, maps and other content. They also include search engines to enable users to find Bible passages by keyword and by theme.
