= List of Columbia Theological Seminary people =

Alumni and faculty of Columbia Theological Seminary include prominent religious leaders and theologians. Columbia Theological Seminary is a Presbyterian seminary in Decatur, Georgia. It is one of ten theological institutions affiliated with the Presbyterian Church (USA).

== Alumni ==
=== Alumni, 1925-present (Decatur, GA campus) ===
- C. Hassell Bullock, B.D. 1964
- Charles Cousar, B.D. 1958
- D. James Kennedy, graduate
- John C. Knapp, graduate, author, speaker, college president
- John H. Leith, graduate
- Peter Marshall, 1931 graduate, twice chaplain of the United States Senate
- Ben Mathes, graduate, missionary, founder of Rivers of the World
- J. Vernon McGee, graduate (1933), founder of Thru The Bible Radio Network
- Ian Punnett, graduate, radio talk show host
- James M. Robinson, 1946 graduate, New Testament scholar, son of William Childs Robinson (1897–1982), who taught church history and apologetics at Columbia Theological Seminary

=== Alumni, 1828–1925 (Columbia, SC campus) ===
- William Plumer Jacobs, 1864 graduate; minister and founder of Presbyterian College and Thornwell Orphanage
- William Alderman Linton, missionary, founder of Hannam University in Korea
- Benjamin Morgan Palmer, graduate (1841); professor of Church History and Polity (1854–1856), first Moderator of the Presbyterian Church in the Confederate States
- John Leighton Wilson, 1833 graduate; first missionaries to West Africa by the American Board of Commissioners for Foreign Missions

== Faculty ==
=== Current faculty ===
- William P. Brown, William Marcellus McPheeters Professor of Old Testament, writer
- Kathy Dawson, associate professor of Christian Education; director of MAPT program
- Mark Douglas, professor of Christian Ethics; director of M.Div. program
- Anna Carter Florence, Peter Marshall Associate Professor of Preaching
- Israel Galindo, associate dean for Lifelong Learning
- Martha L. Moore-Keish, J.B. Green Professor of Theology
- Marcia Y. Riggs, J. Erskine Love Professor of Christian Ethics, writer
- Love L. Sechrest, dean of the Faculty and Vice President for Academic Affairs
- Jeffery Tribble, associate professor of Ministry
- Haruko Nawata Ward, professor of Church History
- Ralph Watkins, Peachtree Associate Professor of Evangelism and Church Growth
- Christine Roy Yoder, J. McDowell Richards Professor of Biblical Interpretation

=== Faculty emeriti ===
- Walter Brueggemann, Old Testament professor emeritus, theologian and writer
- Erskine Clarke, professor emeritus, religious historian
- Catherine Gunsalus Gonzalez, professor emerita, writer
- E. Elizabeth Johnson, J. Davison Philips Professor of New Testament
- Sara Myers, professor emerita, theological librarian
- Kathleen M. O'Connor, Old Testament professor emerita, writer
- George Stroup, J.B. Green professor emeritus of Theology, author
- Brian Wren, Conant Professor of Worship

=== Past faculty, 1925-present (Decatur, GA campus) ===
- David L. Bartlett, professor emeritus, writer
- G. Thompson Brown (1921–2014), professor emeritus, writer, missionary, Director of the Division of International Mission for the Presbyterian Church (US) (1967–1980), founder of Honam Theological Academy (now Honam Theological University and Seminary)
- Barbara Brown Taylor, adjunct professor of Christian Spirituality, and well-known Episcopal priest and writer
- Pamela Cooper-White, Ben G and Nancye Clapp Gautier Professor of Pastoral Theology, Care and Counseling. writer
- Charles Cousar (1933–2014), professor emeritus, New Testament scholar, author
- Justo Gonzalez, adjunct professor with an international reputation for his contributions to Historical theology
- Shirley Guthrie, J.B. Green Professor of Systematic Theology
- Joan Gray, interim vice president for Student Services and dean of students, former moderator of the 217th General Assembly
- Ben Campbell Johnson, professor emeritus of Evangelism, former director of Spirituality, writer
- Kimberly Bracken Long, associate professor of Worship
- Deborah Flemister Mullen, dean of faculty/executive vice president, associate professor of American Christianity and Black Church Studies
- Rodger Nishioka, Benton Family Associate Professor of Christian Education
- Syngman Rhee (1931–2015), Distinguished Visiting Professor for Global Leadership Development
- Ronald Wallace (1911–2006), professor of Biblical Theology and brother-in-law of Thomas F. Torrance, J. B. Torrance, and David W. Torrance

=== Past faculty, 1828–1925 (Columbia, SC campus) ===
- John L. Girardeau, professor of systematic theology
- Charles Colcock Jones, Sr., professor (1835–38, 1847–50), patriarch of the family chronicled in Children of Pride (1972) and Erskine Clarke's Dwelling Place (2005)
- William Swan Plumer (1802–1880), professor of Didactic and Polemic Theology (1867–1875) and professor of Pastoral, Casuistic, and Historical Theology (1875–1880)
- James Henley Thornwell (1812–1862), professor of theology post-1855; president of South Carolina College, leader in organizing the Presbyterian Church in the Confederate States
- Joseph R. Wilson, father of Woodrow Wilson, faculty member following the Civil War
- James Woodrow, first Perkins Professor of Natural Science, uncle of President Woodrow Wilson and controversial professor
