= E. Elizabeth Johnson =

American New Testament scholar

- Occupation: New Testament scholar
- Title: J. Davison Philips Professor of New Testament
- Spouse: Peter M. Paulsen
- Children: 2 daughters

Academic background
- Education: Princeton Theological Seminary
- Thesis: The function of apocalyptic and wisdom traditions in Romans 9-11

Academic work
- Discipline: Biblical studies
- Sub-discipline: New Testament studies
- Institutions: Queens College, Charlotte; Princeton Theological Seminary; New Brunswick Theological Seminary; Columbia Theological Seminary

E. Elizabeth Johnson is an American New Testament scholar and the J. Davison Philips Professor of New Testament at Columbia Theological Seminary. She is widely known for her writings on the New Testament, specifically the Pauline Letters.

== Career ==
Johnson received a B.G.S. from Ohio University, an M.Div. and a Ph.D. from Princeton Theological Seminary. She was the chaplain and instructor in Humanities at Queens College (1979-1983) before she became a Teaching Fellow at Princeton Theological Seminary (1983-1986). Beginning in 1986, she served as the associate professor of New Testament at New Brunswick Theological Seminary (1986-1998). She is currently the J. Davison Philips Professor of New Testament, Emerita at Columbia Theological Seminary.

== Thought ==
Johnson has contributed extensively to a number of commentary series and scholarly publications. Her work includes being an editor of the Feasting on the Word: Preaching the Revised Common Lectionary series and co-general editor to the Feasting on the Gospels series, which includes Feasting on the Gospels: Matthew Vols. 1 and 2, that were awarded the Reference Book of the Year award from the Academy of Parish Clergy.

Johnson has been interested in the ways the church uses the Bible to think about faith and life. Her work explores how the Pauline letters invite us to reflect about who God is and what Jesus' death and resurrection mean for human life and society. Her work has also explored how the New Testament relates to families and family values. Her exegetical perspective has allowed for new ways of viewing and interpreting many of the epistles of the New Testament to address today's world. Through her work she has contributed to Feminist-Womanist Biblical Studies and has contributed to the national conversation on capital punishment by giving a lecture titled, The Bible and Capital Punishment, during a Teach-in at Columbia Theological Seminary.

== Works ==
=== Thesis ===
- Johnson, E. Elizabeth (1987). The function of apocalyptic and wisdom traditions in Romans 9-11 (Ph.D.). Princeton Theological Seminary.

=== Books ===
- ——— (1988). The Miracle of Pentecost: Peacemaking in the Acts of the Apostles. Louisville, KY: Presbyterian Peacemaking Program. OCLC 22153064.
- ——— (1989). The function of apocalyptic and wisdom traditions in Romans 9-11. Dissertation series (Society of Biblical Literature). Vol. 109. Atlanta, GA: Scholars Press. ISBN 9781555402266. OCLC 19975883. - publication of author's thesis
- ——— (1991). Good News to the Poor: Peacemaking in the Gospel of Luke. Louisville, KY: Presbyterian Peacemaking Program. OCLC 37885593.
- ———; Rogers, Jack; Niccolls, Thomas (1995). The Common Good in Christ: Peacemaking in Ephesians. Louisville, KY: Presbyterian Peacemaking Program. OCLC 44437437.

=== As editor ===
- ———; Carroll, John T.; Cosgrove, Charles H., eds. (1991). Faith and History: Essays in Honor of Paul W. Meyer. Atlanta, GA: Scholars Press. ISBN 9781555403836. OCLC 22813314.
- ———; Hay, David M., eds. (1995). Romans. Pauline Theology. Vol. 3. Minneapolis, MN: Fortress Press. ISBN 9780800629298. OCLC 221996039.

=== Chapters ===
- ——— (1991). "The Wisdom of God as Apocalyptic Power". In Johnson, E. Elizabeth; Carroll, John T.; Cosgrove, Charles H. (eds.). Faith and History: Essays in Honor of Paul W. Meyer. Atlanta, GA: Scholars Press. pp. 137–148. ISBN 9781555403836. OCLC 22813314.
- ——— (1992). "Ephesians". In Newsom, Carol A.; Ringe, Sharon H. (eds.). The Women's Bible Commentary. Louisville, KY: Westminster John Knox. pp. 428–432. ISBN 9780664219222. OCLC 733677873.
- ——— (1992). "Colossians". In Newsom, Carol A.; Ringe, Sharon H. (eds.). The Women's Bible Commentary. Louisville, KY: Westminster John Knox. pp. 437–439. ISBN 9780664219222. OCLC 733677873.
- ——— (1992). "2 Thessalonians". In Newsom, Carol A.; Ringe, Sharon H. (eds.). The Women's Bible Commentary. Louisville, KY: Westminster John Knox. pp. 442–443. ISBN 9780664219222. OCLC 733677873.
- ——— (1993). "Wisdom and Apocalyptic in Paul". In Perdue, Leo G.; Scott, Bernard Brandon; Wiseman, William Johnston (eds.). In Search of Wisdom: Essays in Memory of John G. Gammie. Louisville, KY: Westminster John Knox. pp. 263–283. ISBN 9780664252953. OCLC 851239455.
- ——— (1995). "Romans 9-11: The Faithfulness and Impartiality of God". In Johnson, E. Elizabeth; Hay, David M. (eds.). Romans. Pauline Theology. Vol. 3. Minneapolis, MN: Fortress Press. pp. 240–258. ISBN 9780800629298. OCLC 221996039.
- ——— (1995). "The Function of Apocalyptic and Wisdom Traditions in Romans 9-11: Rethinking the Questions". SBL Seminar Papers 1995. Atlanta, GA: Scholars Press. pp. 352–361.
- ——— (1997). "Divine Initiative and Human Response". In Fowl, Stephen (ed.). A Critical Reader in the Theological Interpretation of Scripture. Cambridge, MA: Blackwell. pp. 356–370.
- ——— (1997). "Preface". In Johnson, E. Elizabeth; Hay, David M. (eds.). Pauline Theology, Vol. 4: Looking Back, Pressing On. Atlanta, GA: Scholars Press. pp. vii–xiii.
- ——— (1997). "Advent Christmas". Proclamation 6: interpreting the lessons of the church year. Series C. Philadelphia, PA: Fortress.
- ——— (1998). "2 Esdras". In Newsom, Carol A.; Ringe, Sharon H.; Thompson, Cynthia (eds.). The Women's Bible Commentary (Revised ed.). Louisville, KY: Westminster John Knox. pp. 267–271.
- ——— (1998). "A Critical Assessment of Mark Nanos, The Mystery of Romans". Critical Review of Books in Religion. Atlanta, GA: Scholars Press.
- ——— (2000). "Colossians". Harper's Bible Commentary (Revised ed.). New York: Harper & Row. pp. 1126–1130.
- ——— (2002). "'Who Is My Mother?' Family Values in the Gospel of Mark". In Gaventa, Beverly R.; Rigby, Cynthia L. (eds.). Blessed One: Protestant Perspectives on Mary. Louisville, KY: Westminster John Knox. pp. 32–46.
- ——— (2005). "Life Together in the Household of God". In Johnson, E. Elizabeth; Yoder, Christine Roy; O’Connor, Kathleen M.; Saunders, Stanley P. (eds.). Shaking Heaven and Earth: Essays in Honor of Walter Brueggemann and Charles B. Cousar. Louisville, KY: Westminster John Knox. pp. 89–103.
- ——— (2007). "A Modest Proposal in Context". In Foster, Robert (ed.). The Impartial God: Essays in Honor of Jouette M. Bassler. Sheffield: Sheffield Phoenix Press. pp. 232–245.
- ——— (2007). "Central's Teaching Elders and Their Seminaries". In Lehfeldt, Martin C. (ed.). On Our Way Rejoicing: The 150th Anniversary of Central Presbyterian Church in Atlanta. Atlanta, GA: XLibris. pp. 161–178.
- ——— (2007). "Central's Ministers". In Lehfeldt, Martin C. (ed.). On Our Way Rejoicing: The 150th Anniversary of Central Presbyterian Church in Atlanta. Atlanta, GA: XLibris. pp. 215–218.
- ——— (2008). "Exegetical Perspective on 1 Corinthians 1:3-9". In Bartlett, David L.; Taylor, Barbara Brown (eds.). Feasting on the Word: Preaching the Revised Common Lectionary: Year B. Vol. 1. Louisville, KY: Westminster John Knox. pp. 15–19.
- ——— (2009). "1 Thessalonians and 2 Thessalonians". In O’Day, Gail R.; Petersen, David L. (eds.). Theological Bible Commentary. Louisville, KY: Westminster John Knox. pp. 427–434. ISBN 9781611640304. OCLC 810931688.
- ——— (2009). "Exegetical Perspective on James 5:13-20". In Bartlett, David L.; Taylor, Barbara Brown (eds.). Feasting on the Word: Preaching the Revised Common Lectionary: Year B. Vol. 4. Louisville, KY: Westminster John Knox. pp. 111–115.
- ——— (2009). "Exegetical Perspective on James 3:13-4:3, 7-8a". In Bartlett, David L.; Taylor, Barbara Brown (eds.). Feasting on the Word: Preaching the Revised Common Lectionary: Year B. Vol. 4. Louisville, KY: Westminster John Knox. pp. 87–91.
- ——— (2009). "Exegetical Perspective on James 3:1-12". In Bartlett, David L.; Taylor, Barbara Brown (eds.). Feasting on the Word: Preaching the Revised Common Lectionary: Year B. Vol. 4. Louisville, KY: Westminster John Knox. pp. 63–67.
- ——— (2010). "Exegetical Perspective on Romans 6:3-11". In Bartlett, David L.; Taylor, Barbara Brown (eds.). Feasting on the Word: Preaching the Revised Common Lectionary: Year A. Vol. 2. Louisville, KY: Westminster John Knox. pp. 341–345.
- ——— (2010). "Exegetical Perspective on Colossians 3:1-4". In Bartlett, David L.; Taylor, Barbara Brown (eds.). Feasting on the Word: Preaching the Revised Common Lectionary: Year A. Vol. 2. Louisville, KY: Westminster John Knox. pp. 365–369.
- ——— (2010). "Exegetical Perspective on 1 Peter 1:3-9". In Bartlett, David L.; Taylor, Barbara Brown (eds.). Feasting on the Word: Preaching the Revised Common Lectionary: Year A. Vol. 2. Louisville, KY: Westminster John Knox. pp. 389–393.
- ——— (2010). "Exegetical Perspective on 1 Peter 4:1-8". In Bartlett, David L.; Taylor, Barbara Brown (eds.). Feasting on the Word: Preaching the Revised Common Lectionary: Year A. Vol. 2. Louisville, KY: Westminster John Knox. pp. 317–321.
- ——— (2010). "Exegetical Perspective on Hebrews 4:14-16; 5:7-9". In Bartlett, David L.; Taylor, Barbara Brown (eds.). Feasting on the Word: Preaching the Revised Common Lectionary: Year A. Vol. 2. Louisville, KY: Westminster John Knox. pp. 291–295.
- ——— (2010). "Exegetical Perspective on Luke 18:9-14". In Bartlett, David L.; Taylor, Barbara Brown (eds.). Feasting on the Word: Preaching the Revised Common Lectionary: Year C. Vol. 4. Louisville, KY: Westminster John Knox. pp. 213–217.
- ——— (2010). "Exegetical Perspective on Luke 6:20-31". In Bartlett, David L.; Taylor, Barbara Brown (eds.). Feasting on the Word: Preaching the Revised Common Lectionary: Year C. Vol. 4. Louisville, KY: Westminster John Knox. pp. 237–241.
- ——— (2010). "Exegetical Perspective on Luke 19:1-10". In Bartlett, David L.; Taylor, Barbara Brown (eds.). Feasting on the Word: Preaching the Revised Common Lectionary: Year C. Vol. 4. Louisville, KY: Westminster John Knox. pp. 261–265.
- ——— (2010). "Pastoral Perspective on Philemon 1-21". In Bartlett, David L.; Taylor, Barbara Brown (eds.). Feasting on the Word: Preaching the Revised Common Lectionary: Year C. Vol. 4. Louisville, KY: Westminster John Knox. pp. 38–42.
- ——— (2012). "God's Covenant Faithfulness to Israel". In Sumney, Jerry L. (ed.). Reading Romans. SBL Resources for Biblical Studies. Atlanta, GA: Scholars Press.
- ——— (2012). "Colossians". In Newsom, Carol A.; Ringe, Sharon H. (eds.). The Women's Bible Commentary (Second ed.). Louisville, KY: Westminster John Knox.
- ——— (2012). "Ephesians". In Newsom, Carol A.; Ringe, Sharon H. (eds.). The Women's Bible Commentary (Second ed.). Louisville, KY: Westminster John Knox.
- ——— (2012). "Paul's Reliance on Scripture in 1 Thessalonians". In Stanley, Christopher D. (ed.). Paul and Scripture: Extending the Conversation. SBL Resources for Biblical Studies. Ann Arbor, MI: Society of ~Biblical Literature. pp. 143–62. ISBN 9781589836952.

=== Articles ===
- ——— (July–August 1987). "Be Trustworthy—But Also Trusting". Presbyterian Survey: 47.
- ——— (1988). "Not in Vain: I Corinthians 15:51-58". Perspectives. 3: 4–6.
- ——— (1988–89). "Jews and Christians in the New Testament: John, Matthew, and Paul". Reformed Review. 42: 113–128.
- ——— (1989). "Biblical and Historical Perspectives on Human Sexuality". Church and Society. 80 (2): 6–25.
- ——— (1989). "The Children of Light". The Church Herald. 46 (11): 30–31.
- ——— (March 1991). "Exegetical essays for the third Sunday in Lent through Easter (Exodus 20:1-17; Ephesians 2:4- 10; John 12:20-33; Mark 15:1-39; Mark 16:1-8)". Lectionary Homiletics. 2.
- ——— (October–December 1994). "Diverse Community in the New Testament". The Living Pulpit. 3 (4): 20–21.
- ——— (1995). "Beker as Mentor". The Princeton Seminary Bulletin. New Series. 16 (1): 15–21.
- ——— (1999). "Preaching From Matthew". Journal for Preachers. 23 (1): 37–42.
- ——— (2002). "Apocalyptic Family Values". Interpretation. 56: 34–44. doi:10.1177/002096430005600104. S2CID 145601905.
- ——— (2004). "Temptation". Journal for Preachers. 27 (2): 59–61.
- ——— (2005). "Preaching in 1 Thessalonians". Journal for Preachers. 28 (3): 20–26.
