= Beverly Roberts Gaventa =

American theologian

Beverly Roberts Gaventa is Distinguished Professor of New Testament Interpretation at Baylor University and Helen H.P. Manson Professor of New Testament Literature and Exegesis Emerita at Princeton Theological Seminary.

== Biography ==
Beverly Roberts Gaventa matriculated at: Phillips University, B.A., 1970; Union Theological Seminary, New York City, M.Div., 1973, studying with Raymond E. Brown and J. Louis Martyn; and Duke University, Ph.D., 1978, with W. D. Davies as her dissertation supervisor.

Gaventa taught at Baylor University (2013-2021), Princeton Theological Seminary (1992–2013), Columbia Theological Seminary (1987–1992), and Colgate Rochester Divinity School (1976–1987)

She was elected president of the Society of Biblical Literature for 2016. She is an editor-at-large for The Christian Century. She is a ruling elder in the Presbyterian Church (USA) and a member of the University Presbyterian Church, Austin, Texas.

== Honors ==
- Extraordinary Professor, Stellenbosch University, 2004–2021
- Member, Center of Theological Inquiry, 2000–2001, 2004–2005
- Doctor of Letters (honoris causa), Christian Theological Seminary, 2002
- Award of Special Merit, Disciples Theological Digest, 1988 (for Gaventa's book From Darkness to Light, 1986)
- Doctor of Divinity (honoris causa), Kalamazoo College, 1983
- Award for Theological Scholarship and Research, Association of Theological Schools, 1981–82
- A Festschrift, The Unrelenting God: God's Action In Scripture in 2013, to honor Gaventa.
- Burkitt Medal for Biblical Studies, British Academy, 2020

== Selected works ==
=== Books ===
- Gaventa, Beverly Roberts (1986). From Darkness to Light: Aspects of Conversion in the New Testament. Minneapolis, MO: Fortress Press.
- ——— (1998). I and II Thessalonians. Interpretation. Louisville, KY: Westminster John Knox Press.
- ——— (1995). Mary: Glimpses of the Mother of Jesus. Studies on personalities of the New Testament. Minneapolis, MN & Columbia: Fortress Press & University of South Carolina Press. ISBN 9780585342696. OCLC 47008522.
- ——— (2003). The Acts of the Apostles. Abingdon New Testament Commentaries. Nashville, TN: Abingdon.
- ——— (2007). Our Mother Saint Paul. Louisville, KY: Westminster John Knox Press.
- ——— (2016). When in Romans: An Invitation to Linger with the Gospel According to Paul. Theological Explorations for the Church Catholic. Grand Rapids, MI: Baker Academic.
- ———. Romans. New Testament Library. Louisville, KY: Westminster John Knox Press. - 2024

=== Articles and chapters ===
- ——— (1982). "′You Will Be My Witnesses′: Aspects of Mission in the Acts of the Apostles". Missiology. 10 (4): 413–425. doi:10.1177/009182968201000403. S2CID 154512062.
- ——— (1982). "The Eschatology of Luke-Acts Revisited". Encounter. 43 (1): 27–42.
- ——— (1983). "The Bible and the New York Times: Ministry in Tension". Lexington Theological Quarterly. 18 (3): 101–106.
- ——— (1983). "′You Proclaim the Lord's Death′: 1 Corinthians 11:26 and Paul's Understanding of Worship". Review & Expositor. 80 (3): 377–387. doi:10.1177/003463738308000307. S2CID 147506611.
- ——— (1985). "′Where Is Boasting?′: Romans 3:27 and Its Contexts". Proceedings. 5: 57–66.
- ——— (1986). "Galatians 1 and 2: Autobiography as Paradigm". Novum Testamentum. 28 (4): 309–326. doi:10.1163/156853686X00255.
- ——— (1986). "To Speak Thy Word with All Boldness: Acts 4:23-31". Faith and Mission. 3 (2): 76–82.
- ——— (1987). "The Rhetoric of Death in the Wisdom of Paul and the Letters of Solomon". In Hoglund, Kenneth G.; Huwiler, Elizabeth F.; Glass, Jonathan T.; Lee, Roger W. (eds.). The Listening Heart: Essays in Wisdom and the Psalms in Honor of Roland E. Murphy. Journal for the Study of the Old Testament Supplement Series. Vol. 58. Sheffield: JSOT Press. pp. 127–145. ISBN 9781850750857. OCLC 613277058.
- ——— (1988). "Toward a Theology of Acts: Reading and Rereading". Interpretation. 42 (2): 146–157. doi:10.1177/002096438804200204. S2CID 170660214.
- ——— (1990). "Apostles as Babes and Nurses in 1 Thessalonians 2:7". In Carroll, John T.; Cosgrove, Charles H.; Johnson, E. Elizabeth (eds.). Faith and History: Essays in Honor of Paul W. Meyer. Atlanta: Scholars Press. pp. 193–207. ISBN 9781597520010. OCLC 827955049.
- ——— (1990). "The Maternity of Paul: An Exegetical Study of Galatians 4:19". In Fortna, Richard T.; Gaventa, Beverly Roberts (eds.). The Conversation Continues: Studies in Paul and John in Honor of J. Louis Martyn. Nashville, TN: Abingdon. pp. 189–201. ISBN 9780687096343. OCLC 499218673.
- ——— (1991). "A Place for Mary in Protestant Preaching". Journal for Preachers. 14 (4): 32–36.
- ——— (1991). "The Singularity of the Gospel: A Reading of Galatians". In Hay, David M. (ed.). Pauline Theology. Vol. 1. Minneapolis, MO: Fortress Press. pp. 147–159.
- ——— (1992). "The Peril of Modernizing Henry Joel Cadbury". In Parsons, Mikael C.; Tyson, Joseph B. (eds.). Cadbury, Knox, and Talbert: American Contributions to the Study of Acts. Biblical Scholarship in North America. Atlanta, GA: Scholars Press. pp. 7–26. OCLC 645860152.
- ——— (1993). "A Place for Mary in Protestant Ministry". Word & World. 13 (4): 373–378.
- ——— (1993). "Response to ′The Bible and Human Sexuality′". American Baptist Quarterly. 12 (4): 329–333.
- ——— (1994). "The Discipleship of Extravagance". Princeton Seminary Bulletin. 15 (1): 52–55.
- ——— (1996). "Mother's Milk and Ministry in 1 Corinthians 3". In Lovering, Eugene H.; Sumney, Jerry L. (eds.). Theology and Ethics in Paul and His Interpreters: Essays in Honor of Victor Paul Furnish. Grand Rapids, MI: Eerdmans. pp. 101–113. ISBN 9780687007677. OCLC 493901247.
- ——— (1996). "Our Mother St Paul: Toward the Recovery of a Neglected Theme". Princeton Seminary Bulletin. 17 (1): 29–44.
- ——— (1996). "The Archive of Exegesis: John 21 and the Problem of Narrative Closure". In Culpepper, R. Alan; Black, C. Clifton (eds.). Exploring the Gospel of John: Essays in Honor of D. Moody Smith. Louisville, KY: Westminster John Knox. pp. 240–252.
- ———; Wilson, Patrick J. (1998). "Preaching as the Re-reading of Scripture". Interpretation. 52 (4): 392–404. doi:10.1177/002096439805200406. S2CID 170912871.
- ——— (1999). "The Economy of Grace: Reflections on 2 Corinthians 8 and 9". In Jones, L. Gregory; Johnson, Robert K.; Wilson, Jonathan R. (eds.). Grace Upon Grace: Essays in Honor of Thomas A. Langford. Nashville, TN: Abingdon. pp. 51–62. ISBN 9780687086092. OCLC 466660837.
- ——— (2000). "Is Galatians Just a ′Guy Thing′: A Theological Reflection". Interpretation. 54 (3): 267–278. doi:10.1177/002096430005400304. S2CID 170789780.
- ——— (2001). "Traditions in Conversation and Collision: Reflections on Multiculturalism in Acts of the Apostles". In Blount, Brian K.; Tisdale, Leonora Tubbs (eds.). Making Room at the Table: An Invitation to Multicultural Worship. Louisville, KY: Westminster John Knox. pp. 30–41. ISBN 9780664222024. OCLC 900899810.
- ——— (2002). "Witnessing to the Gospel in Acts of the Apostles: Beyond the Conversion or Conversation Dilemma". Word & World. 22 (3): 238–245.
- ——— (2004). "The Cosmic Power of Sin in Paul's Letter to the Romans: Toward a Widescreen Edition". Interpretation. 58 (3): 229–240. doi:10.1177/002096430405800302. S2CID 170170753.
- ——— (2004). "′Nothing Will Be Impossible with God′: Mary as the Mother of Believers". In Braaten, Carl E.; Jensen, Robert W. (eds.). Mary, Mother of God. Grand Rapids, MI: Eerdmans. pp. 19–35. ISBN 9780802822666. OCLC 644250818.
- ——— (2004). "Theology and Ecclesiology in the Miletus Speech: Reflections on Content and Context". New Testament Studies. 50 (1): 36–52. doi:10.1017/S0028688504000037. S2CID 170953234.
- ——— (2004). "Initiatives Divine and Human in the Lukan Story World". In Barton, Stephen C.; Stanton, Graham N.; Longenecker, Bruce W. (eds.). The Holy Spirit and Christian Origins: Essays in Honor of James D.G. Dunn. Grand Rapids, MI: Eerdmans. pp. 79–89. ISBN 9780802828224. OCLC 799197630.
- ——— (2005). "Interpreting the Scriptures Together: Seeking Visible Unity of the Church". Journal of Ecumenical Studies. 43 (3): 309–319.
- ——— (2005). "′Turning the World Upside Down′: A Reflection on the Acts of the Apostles". In Yoder, Christine Roy; O′Connor, Kathleem M.; Johnson, E. Elizabeth; Saunders, Stanley P. (eds.). Shaking Heaven and Earth: Essays in Honor of Walter Brueggemann and Charles B. Cousar. Louisville, KY: Westminster John Knox Press. pp. 105–116. ISBN 9780664227777. OCLC 1025491101.
- ——— (2005). "God Handed Them Over: Reading Romans 1:18-32 Apocalyptically". Australian Biblical Review. 53: 42–53.
- ——— (2005). "′All Generations Will Called Me Blessed′: Mary in Biblical and Ecumenical Perspective". In Levine, Amy-Jill (ed.). A Feminist Companion to Mariology. Feminist Companion to the New Testament and Early Christian Writings. New York: T&T Clark. pp. 121–129. ISBN 9780826466617. OCLC 783314647.
- ——— (2007). "To Glorify God and Enjoy Him Forever: A Place for Joy in Reformed Readings of Scripture". In Alston Jr., Wallace M.; Welker, Michael (eds.). Reformed Theology: Identity and Ecumenicity II. Biblical Interpretation in the Reformed Tradition. Grand Rapids, MI: Eerdmans. pp. 107–115. ISBN 9780802803863. OCLC 929507467.
- ——— (2007). "Interpreting the Death of Jesus Apocalyptically: Reconsidering Romans 8:32". In Still, Todd D. (ed.). Jesus and Paul Reconnected: Fresh Pathways into an Old Debate. Grand Rapids, MI: Eerdmans. pp. 125–145. ISBN 9780802831491. OCLC 155756056.
- ——— (2008). "Interpreting the Scriptures Together: Seeking Visible Unity of the Church". Journal of Ecumenical Studies. 43 (3): 309–319.
- ——— (2008). "Finding a Place for Children in the Letters of Paul". In Gaventa, Beverly Roberts; Bunge, Marcia J.; Fretheim, Terence E. (eds.). The Child in the Bible. Grand Rapids, MI: Eerdmans. pp. 233–248. ISBN 9780802848352. OCLC 717936398.
- ———; Hays, Richard B. (2008). "Seeking the Identity of Jesus". In Gaventa, Beverly Roberts; Hays, Richard B. (eds.). Seeking the Identity of Jesus: A Pilgrimage. Grand Rapids, MI: Eerdmans. pp. 1–24. ISBN 9780802824714. OCLC 213452269.
- ——— (2008). "Learning and Relearning the Identity of Jesus from Luke-Acts". In Gaventa, Beverly Roberts; Hays, Richard B. (eds.). Seeking the Identity of Jesus: A Pilgrimage. Grand Rapids, MI: Eerdmans. pp. 148–165. ISBN 9780802824714. OCLC 213452269.
- ——— (2008). "From Toxic Speech to the Redemption of Doxology in Paul's Letter to the Romans". In Wagner, J. Ross; Rowe, C. Kavin; Grieb, A. Katherine (eds.). The Word Leaps the Gap: Essays on Scripture and Theology in Honor of Richard B. Hays. Grand Rapids, MI: Eerdmans. pp. 392–408. ISBN 9780802863560. OCLC 845439253.
- ——— (2009). "'To Preach the Gospel′: Romans 1,15 and the Purpose of Romans". In Schnelle, Udo (ed.). The Letter to the Romans. Bibliotheca Ephemeridum Theologicarum Lovaniensium. Vol. 226. Leuven: Peeters. pp. 179–195. ISBN 9789042921993. OCLC 781013280.
- ——— (2010). "On the Calling-into-Being of Israel: Romans 9:6-29". In Wilk, Florian; Wagner, J. Ross (eds.). Between Gospel and Election: Explorations in the Interpretation of Romans 9-11. Wissenschaftliche Untersuchungen zum Neuen Testament. Vol. 257. Tübingen: Mohr Siebeck. pp. 255–269. ISBN 9783161505331. OCLC 656604221.
- ——— (2010). "Seeking the Identity of Jesus: A Rejoinder". Journal for the Study of the New Testament. 32 (3): 363–370. doi:10.1177/0142064X09357680. S2CID 144381306.
- ——— (2011). "Neither Height nor Depth: Discerning the Cosmology of Romans". Scottish Journal of Theology. 64 (3): 265–278. doi:10.1017/S0036930611000111. S2CID 170470077.
- ——— (2011). "The Mission of God in Paul's Letter to the Romans". In Burke, Trevor J.; Rosner, Brian S. (eds.). Paul as Missionary: Identity, Activity, Theology, and Practice. Library of New Testament Studies. Vol. 420. New York: T&T Clark. pp. 65–75. ISBN 9780567573247. OCLC 910654860.
- ——— (2011). "Reading for the Subject: The Paradox of Power in Romans 14:1-15:6". Journal of Theological Interpretation. 5 (1): 1–11. doi:10.2307/26421349. JSTOR 26421349.
- ——— (2012). "Pentecost and Trinity". Interpretation. 66 (1): 5–15. doi:10.1177/0020964311425307. S2CID 170456212.
- ——— (2013). "The Shape of the 'I': The Psalter, the Gospel, and the Speaker in Romans 7". In Gaventa, Beverly Roberts (ed.). Apocalyptic Paul: Cosmos and Anthropos in Romans 5-8. Waco: Baylor University Press. pp. 77–91. ISBN 9781602589698. OCLC 861780638.
- ——— (2014). "The Character of God's Faithfulness: A Response to N.T. Wright". Journal for the Study of Paul and His Letters. 4 (1): 71–79. doi:10.2307/26371726. JSTOR 26371726.
- ——— (2014). "Which Humans? What Response?: A Reflection on Pauline Theology". Ex Auditu. 30: 50–64.
- ——— (2014). "The Outlaw Jesus, the Justice of God, and Paul's Letter to the Romans". Theology Today. 71 (3): 347–351. doi:10.1177/0040573614542385. S2CID 170699341.
- ——— (2015). "A Word of Gratitude". In Byron, John; Lohr, Joel N. (eds.). I (Still) Believe: Leading Bible Scholars Share Their Stories of Faith and Scholarship. Grand Rapids, MI: Eerdmans. pp. 83–92. ISBN 9780310515166. OCLC 895728144.
- ——— (2017). "Reading Romans 13 with Simone Weil: Toward a More Generous Hermeneutic". Journal of Biblical Literature. 136 (1): 3–22. doi:10.1353/jbl.2017.0000. S2CID 171861129.

=== Edited volumes ===
- ———; Fortna, Richard T., eds. (1990). The Conversation Continues: Studies in Paul and John in Honor of J. Louis Martyn. Nashville, TN: Abingdon. ISBN 9780687096343. OCLC 499218673.
- ———; Rigby, Cynthia L., eds. (2002). Blessed One: Protestant Perspectives on Mary. Louisville, KY: Westminster John Knox Press. ISBN 9780664224387. OCLC 614620640.
- ———; Miller, Patrick D., eds. (2005). The Ending of Mark and the Ends of God: Essays in Memory of Donald Harrisville Juel. Louisville, KY: Westminster John Knox Press. ISBN 9780664227395. OCLC 717029388.
- ———; Bunge, Marcia J.; Fretheim, Terence E., eds. (2008). The Child in the Bible. Grand Rapids, MI: Eerdmans. ISBN 9780802848352. OCLC 717936398.
- ———; Hays, Richard B., eds. (2008). Seeking the Identity of Jesus: A Pilgrimage. Grand Rapids, MI: Eerdmans. ISBN 9780802824714. OCLC 213452269.
- ———; Petersen, David L., eds. (2010). The New Interpreter's One-Volume Commentary. Nashville: Abingdon Press. ISBN 9781426735509. OCLC 891465505.
- ———, ed. (2013). Apocalyptic Paul: Cosmos and Anthropos in Romans 5-8. Waco: Baylor University Press. ISBN 9781602589698. OCLC 861780638.
