= Stanley P. Saunders =

New Testament scholar

- Occupation: New Testament scholar
- Title: Emeritus Professor of New Testament at Columbia Theological Seminary

Academic background
- Education: Princeton Theological Seminary
- Thesis: (1990)

Academic work
- Institutions: Columbia Theological Seminary
- Main interests: Social justice, creation care

Stanley P. Saunders is a New Testament scholar, whose particular research interest includes eschatology, creation and the Gospel of Matthew. He is also involved in issues of social justice particularly pertaining to the American criminal justice system and creation care.

== Career ==
Saunders received a B.A. from San Jose Christian College (1975), a M.Div. from Emmanuel School of Religion (1980) and a Ph.D. from Princeton Theological Seminary (1990). He began his academic career as an assistant professor of New Testament at Wartburg Theological Seminary (1984-1988). He then took the position of assistant professor of New Testament at Columbia Theological Seminary (1991-1999) and then served as associate professor of New Testament.

By 2023, he had retired from teaching and was focusing on restorative justice and writing.

== Thought ==
In much of Saunders' work he asserts "we usually think that the goal of exegesis is to uncover the meanings in a text. But ‘meaning’ is discovered more in the dialogues that transpire between interpreters, their communities and worlds, the text, the worlds of the text, and the tradition." He is a proponent of the school of biblical interpretation which takes into account all external factors in the current setting, not just the text itself. This has led to an increased emphasis of how scripture engages the contemporary world and its current issues, such as care for the earth and the injustices of the criminal justice system.

== Works ==
=== Books ===
- Saunders, Stanley P.; Campbell, Charles L. (2000). The Word on the Street: Performing the Scriptures in the Urban Context. Grand Rapids, MI: Eerdmans. ISBN 9780802843937. OCLC 43445518.
- ——— (2001). Philippians and Galatians. Interpretation Bible Studies. Louisville, KY: Geneva Press. ISBN 9780664501020. OCLC 46420131.
- ——— (2010). Preaching the Gospel of Matthew: Proclaiming God's Presence. Louisville, KY: Westminster John Knox Press. ISBN 9780664229207. OCLC 505423916.

=== Chapters ===
- ——— (2000). "Gospel of Matthew". In Myers, Alan C. (ed.). The Eerdmans Bible Dictionary. Grand Rapids, MI: Eerdmans. ISBN 9780802842503. OCLC 256847676.
- ——— (2003). "Revelation and Resistance: Narrative and Worship in John's Apocalypse". In Green, Joel B.; Pasquarello, Michael III (eds.). Narrative Reading, Narrative Preaching: Reuniting New Testament Interpretation and Proclamation. Grand Rapids, MI: Baker Academic. pp. 117–150. ISBN 9780801027215. OCLC 1015475103.
- ——— (2005). "Between Blessing and Curse: Reading, Hearing, and Performing the Apocalypse in a World of Terror". In Yoder, Christine R.; Johnson, Beth; O'Connor, Kathleen M. (eds.). Shaking Heaven and Earth: Essays in Honor of Walter Brueggemann and Charles Cousar. Louisville, KY: Westminster John Knox Press. pp. 141–156. ISBN 9780664227777. OCLC 1025491101.
- ——— (2008). "Introductions and Text Notes for Ephesians, Colossians, Philippians, 1 & 2 Thessalonians". The Discipleship Study Bible. Louisville, KY: Westminster John Knox Press.
- ——— (2009). "Matthew". In O’Day, Gail R.; Petersen, David L. (eds.). Theological Bible Commentary. Louisville, KY: Westminster John Knox Press. pp. 293–310.
- ——— (2009). "Prophets in the New Testament and Early Church". New Interpreter's Dictionary of the Bible. Vol. 4. Abingdon Press. pp. 621–622.
- ——— (2009). "Philippians, Letter to the". New Interpreter's Dictionary of the Bible. Vol. 4. Abingdon Press. pp. 503–507.
- ——— (2008–2011). "Exegetical Essays". In Taylor, Barbara Brown; Bartlett, David L. (eds.). Feasting on the Word. Louisville, KY: Westminster John Knox Press. - "Matthew 6:1-6, 16-21"; "Mark 9:1-9"; "Mark 1:9-14."

=== Edited by ===
- Editorial Board Member and Contributor to Elizabeth Johnson and Cynthia Jarvis, eds., Feasting on the Gospels (Westminster John Knox Press, 2013-).

=== Journal articles ===
- ——— (1979). "Christian Eschatology: the Ground and Impetus for Mission". Gospel in Context. 2: 3–10, 16–17.
- ———; Bailey, James L. (1987). "God's Merciful Community," (with )". Currents in Theology and Mission. 14: 325–333.
- ———; Cram, Ronald H. (1992). "Feet Partly of Iron and Partly of Clay: Pedagogy and the Curriculum of Theological Education," (with)". Theological Education. 29: 21–50.
- ———; Campbell, Charles L. (1995). "Anything But Ordinary: Worship and Preaching in Ordinary Time". Journal for Preachers. 18 (4): 25–31.
- ———; Campbell, Charles L. (1996). "What Does This Mean? What Shall We Do?". Journal for Preachers. 19 (4): 3–9.
- ——— (1997). "Discernment on the way to Emmaus: Resurrection Imagination and Practices in Luke 24:13-35," Journal for Preachers". 20 (2): 44–49. - (Also published in Campbell and Saunders, The Word on the Street)
- ——— (1999). "The Reality of a Present God; Living the Word: Matthew". Sojourners. 28 (1): 46–49.
- ——— (1999). "God With Us in Power: Preaching Matthew Missionally". Journal for Preachers. 22 (2): 25–30.
- ——— (2000). "Taking It to the Streets". The Other Side. 36 (6).
- ——— (2002). "Learning Christ: Eschatology and Spiritual Formation in New Testament Christianity". Interpretation. 56 (2): 155–167. doi:10.1177/002096430005600204. S2CID 170402730.
- ——— (2005). "Nurturing Hope: Nurturing Faithful Vision Amidst Defeat". Catalyst. 31 (4): 1–3.
