= David Bartlett (disambiguation) =

David Bartlett (born 1968) is an Australian politician.

David Bartlett may also refer to:

- Sir David Bartlett, 3rd Baronet (1912–1989), British fencer
- David Bartlett (bishop) (1900–1977), Bishop of St Asaph
- David L. Bartlett (1941–2017), minister of the American Baptist Churches
- David Bartlett (North Dakota politician) (1855–1913), American lawyer and politician in North Dakota
- David Bartlett (criminologist) (born c. 1972), Australian criminologist, risk expert, academic and TV personality
