= Kathleen O'Connor =

Kathleen O'Connor may refer to:

- Kathleen O'Connor (politician) (1934–2017), Irish Clann na Poblachta politician
- Kathleen O'Connor (painter) (1876–1968), impressionist painter in Western Australia and France
- Kathleen O'Connor (actress) (1894–1957), American actress
- Kathleen M. O'Connor, American Old Testament scholar
