= Catherine Gunsalus González =

American historian

The Reverend Catherine Gunsalus González
- Born: May 20, 1934 (age 92); Albany, New York, U.S.
- Spouse: Justo L. González

Ecclesiastical career
- Religion: Christianity (Presbyterian)
- Church: United Presbyterian Church in the United States of America; Presbyterian Church (USA)
- Ordained: 1965

Academic background
- Education: Beaver College; Boston University
- Thesis: The Place of the Concept Felix Culpa in Christian Doctrine (1965)

Academic work
- Discipline: History; theology
- Sub-discipline: Ecclesiastical history; historical theology
- Institutions: West Virginia Wesleyan College; Louisville Presbyterian Theological Seminary; Columbia Theological Seminary

Catherine Gunsalus González (born 1934) is an American historian, theologian, and ordained Presbyterian minister who is professor emerita of church history at Columbia Theological Seminary in Decatur, Georgia.

== Education ==
Catherine González was born in Albany, New York, on May 20, 1934. After receiving a Bachelor of Arts degree in history and government from Beaver College (now Arcadia University) in 1956, she then earned a Bachelor of Sacred Theology degree in student work from Boston University School of Theology in 1960 and a Doctor of Philosophy degree in systematic theology and history of doctrine from Boston University in 1965.

== Professional life ==
She served in two faculty positions over five years at West Virginia Wesleyan College, where she was the director of student religious life both as assistant professor of Bible and religion and as associate professor. She then served as an associate professor of historical theology at Louisville Presbyterian Theological Seminary, before she became part of the faculty at Columbia Theological Seminary, where she was an associate professor of church history and then the professor of church history. She is now a professor emerita of church history at Columbia Theological Seminary.

In addition to her teaching positions, she has also led and served on a variety of denominational committees for the Presbyterian Church, US and United Presbyterian Church, USA. She was very influential on a national level for the Presbyterian church and in fostering interfaith relationships. These positions included consultant to the National Council's Committee on Future Ecumenical Structure, and on the National Council's Faith and Order Commission, and a member on the General Assembly Committee on Jewish–Christian Relationships.

In 1974, she became the first woman to preach on The Protestant Hour, now called Day1, which is a radio program launched in 1945 to serve as the voice of the mainline Protestant churches and is based out of Atlanta, Georgia. When joining Columbia Theological Seminary's faculty, she also became the first full-time female faculty member.

Her husband, Justo L. González, is a Methodist theologian; they have worked together on several books.

Throughout her career, she has written extensively on many topics of the church. She has also collaborated on a number of books with her husband, Justo L. González, who is a Cuban-American and an influential contributor in the development of Latino/Latina (Hispanic) theology.

== Selected works ==
- Leo and Gregory: Shapers of the Church (Nashville: Graded Press, 1988)
- A Faith More Precious Than Gold: A Study of I Peter (Louisville: Horizons, 1989)
- Vision at Patmos (Nashville: Abingdon Press, 1991)
- "The Larger Context," in Preaching as a Social Act, ed. Arthur VanSeters (Nashville: Abingdon Press, 1988)
- "An Historical Perspective on the Church and the Elderly," in Gerontology in Theological Education: Local Program Development, ed. Barbara Payne and Earl D. C. Brewer (New York: The Haworth Press, 1989), pp. 63–73.
- "Preaching About the Global Witness of the Church – Loving the World as God Loves It," in Preaching in and Out of Season, ed.Thomas G. Long and Neely Dixon McCarter (Louisville: Westminster/John Knox Press, 1990), pp. 53–65.
- "Righteousness of God," in Handbook of Themes for Preaching, ed.James W. Cox (Louisville: Westminster/John Knox Press, 1991), pp. 204–206.
- "The Use of the Bible in Hymns, Liturgy and Education" in New Interpreter's Bible, (Nashville: Abingdon Press, 1994) Vol. I
- "Word and Sacrament: From Social Club to Church," Theology, News and Notes, Volume XXXIII, Number 1, March 1986, pp. 15.
- "Leadership in the Filter of Culture," Journal of the Liturgical Conference, Volume 7, Number 4, Spring, 1989, pp. 103–105.
- "A Changed Theology," Reformed Liturgy and Music, Volume XXIV, Number 1, Winter, 1990, pp. 11–12.
- "Theological Reflections," Lectionary Homiletics, Volume II, Number 4, March, 1991, pp. 2–3.
- "From Death to Life: Themes for Lenten Preaching," Journal for Preachers, Volume XIV, Number 2, Lent, 1991, pp. 11–15.
- "God," Encyclopedia of the Reformed Faith, ed. Donald M. Kim (Nashville: Westminster, 1992).
- "Historical Background to the Globalization of Theology," in On the Use of Scripture in Christian Education and Worship, ed. Bob Evans (MaryKnoll: Orbis, 1994).
- "Liberation Preaching," in Concise Preaching Encyclopedia, ed. Richard Lischer
- Contributor to Preaching God's Transforming Justice: A Lectionary Commentary, Year B, Featuring 22 New Holy Days for Justice.
- Stewardship Journey Through Scripture, produced for Presbyterian Church (USA) through Stewardship Promotion and Resources and Division of Stewardship/Training.
- "Worship for Christmas Season, " Alternatives, Ellenwood, 1993.
