= Justo L. González =

Cuban-American Methodist historian (born 1937)

The Reverend Justo L. González
- Born: Justo Luis González; August 9, 1937 (age 89); Havana, Cuba
- Spouse: Catherine Gunsalus González

Ecclesiastical career
- Religion: Christianity (Methodist)
- Church: United Methodist Church

Academic background
- Education: Instituto de Marianao; Evangelical Seminary of Theology; Yale University
- Thesis: The Christology of Saint Bonaventure (1961)

Academic work
- Discipline: Theology
- Sub-discipline: Historical theology
- School or tradition: Hispanic theology; liberation theology
- Institutions: Evangelical Seminary of Puerto Rico; Emory University
- Notable works: A History of Christian Thought (1970–1975); The Story of Christianity (1984–1985)

Justo Luis González (born August 9, 1937) is a Cuban-American historical theologian and Methodist elder. He is a prolific author and an influential contributor to the development of Latin American theology. His wife, Catherine Gunsalus González, is a professor emerita at Columbia Theological Seminary, and the two have co-authored several books.

== Early life and education ==
González was born in Havana, Cuba, on August 9, 1937. He received Bachelor of Arts and Bachelor of Science degrees from the Instituto de Marianao in 1954. Following three years of studies at the University of Havana, he attended the Evangelical Seminary of Theology in Matanzas, Cuba, from which he received a Bachelor of Sacred Theology degree in 1957. He then studied at Yale University, receiving a Master of Sacred Theology degree in 1958, a Master of Arts degree in 1960, and a Doctor of Philosophy degree in 1961. He was the youngest person to be awarded the historical theology doctorate at Yale.

== Teaching ==
González taught at the Evangelical Seminary of Puerto Rico for eight years, followed by another eight years at Candler School of Theology of Emory University in Georgia. Now retired, he also served as adjunct professor of history at Columbia Theological Seminary in Decatur, Georgia, and at the Interdenominational Theological Center in Atlanta, Georgia. He is also a retired member of the Rio Grande Conference of the United Methodist Church.

He is a leading voice in the growing field of Hispanic theology, comparable to such figures as Virgilio Elizondo, Orlando Costas, and Ada Maria Isasi-Diaz. González is one of the few first-generation Latino theologians to come from a Protestant background. With the Mexican-American United Methodist minister Roy Barton, González helped found the first academic journal related to Latino theology, Apuntes, published by the Mexican-American program of Perkins School of Theology at Southern Methodist University. He also helped to found the Association for Hispanic Theological Education, for which he has twice served as Executive Council Chair. He was the first Director of the Hispanic Summer Program and helped found the Hispanic Theological Initiative.

A festschrift has been published for him: Hispanic Christian Thought at the Dawn of the 21st Century: Apuntes in Honor of Justo L. González, edited by Alvin Padilla, Roberto Goizueta, Eldin Villafañe (Nashville: Abingdon Press, 2005) with contributions from Roman Catholic and Protestant Latino theologians, historians, and biblical scholars.

Justo González is the main narrator for the video lessons of the Christian Believer study course from Cokesbury publishing.

Gonzalez is also the recipient of the Ecumenism Award from Washington Theological Consortium. This was awarded to him because of his ecumenical work that aims to unify churches with a variety of denominational backgrounds.

== Writings ==
In 1984–85 González wrote a popular two-volume textbook entitled The Story of Christianity that covers the history of the church from founding till the present in a readable style. He is also the author of a three-volume work titled History of Christian Thought. Both works commonly are used as college and seminary textbooks.

Additional books include:

- The Story of Christianity Volume One: The Early Church to the Reformation (1984, 2nd ed 2010)
- The Story of Christianity Volume Two: The Reformation to the Present Day (1984, 2nd ed 2010)
- Mañana: Christian Theology from a Hispanic Perspective (1990)
- Out of Every Tribe & Nation: Christian Theology at the Ethnic Roundtable (1992)
- Santa Biblia: The Bible through Hispanic Eyes (1996)
- ¡Alabadle!: Hispanic Christian Worship (1996)
- Tres meses en la escuela de Patmos: Estudios sobre el Apocalipsis ["Three Months in the School of Patmos: Studies in Revelation"] (1997, Spanish language)
- Christian Thought Revisited: Three Types of Theology (1999)
- For the Healing of the Nations: The Book of Revelation in an Age of Cultural Conflict (1999)
- The Story of Christianity: The Early Church to the Present Day (combined edition, 1999)
- Acts: The Gospel of the Spirit (2001)
- Faith and Wealth: A History of Early Christian Ideas on the Origin, Significance, and Use of Money (2002)
- The Changing Shape of Church History (2002)
- The Liberating Pulpit (2003)
- Three Months with Revelation (2004)
- Essential Theological Terms (2005)
- A Concise History of Christian Doctrine (2006)
- Para la Salud de las Naciones : El Apocalipsis en tiempos de conflicto entre culturas ["For the Healing of the Nations: The Book of Revelation in an Age of Cultural Conflict"] (2006, Spanish language)
- The Apostle's Creed for Today (2007)
- Heretics for Armchair Theologians (2008)
- Introducción a la historia de la iglesia ["Introduction to the History of the Church"] (2011, Spanish language)
- The Mestizo Augustine: A Theologian Between Two Cultures (Spanish language, 2013; English translation 2016)
- The History of Theological Education (2015)
- The Story Luke Tells: Luke's Unique Witness to the Gospel (2015)
- A Brief History of Sunday (2017)
- Knowing our Faith (2019)
- The Bible in the Early Church (2022)
