= Mark Douglas =

Mark Douglas may refer to:

- Mark Douglas (politician) (1829–1900), American farmer, businessman, and politician in Wisconsin
- Mark Douglas (ethicist) (born 1966), professor of Christian ethics at Columbia Theological Seminary
- Mark Douglas (cricketer) (born 1968), New Zealand cricketer
- Mark Douglas (rugby union) (born 1960), Welsh rugby union player
- Mark Douglas, co-creator of YouTube channel The Key of Awesome
