= Love L. Sechrest =

Theologian and biblical scholar

- Born: October 14, 1962 (age 64)
- Title: Dean of the Faculty and Vice President for Academic Affairs
- Board member of: African American Biblical Hermeneutics section in the Society of Biblical Literature, Faith & Learning International

Academic background
- Education: Duke University
- Thesis: (2006)

Academic work
- Discipline: Biblical studies
- Sub-discipline: New Testament studies
- Institutions: Fuller Theological Seminary, Columbia Theological Seminary
- Main interests: Race and justice in the New Testament, African American Christianity, and womanist biblical interpretation in the New Testament

Love L. Sechrest (born October 14, 1962) is Dean of the Faculty and Vice President for Academic Affairs at Columbia Theological Seminary and was previously an associate professor of the New Testament at Fuller Theological Seminary, Pasadena, California. Her research interests include race and justice in the New Testament, African American Christianity, and womanist biblical interpretation in the New Testament. She serves on the board of directors for Faith & Learning, International, a Christian mission and social entrepreneurship business incubator.

== Biography ==
Sechrest gained her bachelor's degrees in computer science and sociology at Duke University in 1984 and her master's degree in computer science at Villanova University in 1993.

Prior to changing her career as a biblical scholar, she worked as a chief information officer in the aerospace industry at General Electric. She received several awards from the aerospace industry including from the American Jewish Committee/Shalom Hartman Institute, the Kern Foundation, the Wabash Institute, Duke University, the Fund for Theological Education, the National Institutes of Science/Ford Foundation, the Lockheed Martin President's Award, and the GE Aerospace General Manager's Award.

She completed her Master of Divinity at Trinity Evangelical Divinity School in 1999 and her Ph.D. at Duke University in 2006. She has taught in both schools at the graduate level. She joined Fuller Theological Seminary in 2006 where she continued her teaching and scholarship on the New Testament. Since July 1, 2018, she has been the Dean of the Faculty and Vice President for Academic Affairs of Columbia Theological Seminary.

She has served as co-chair at the African American Biblical Hermeneutics section in the Society of Biblical Literature. She serves on the board of directors for Faith & Learning, International.

== Works ==
- Sechrest, Love L. (2009). A Former Jew: Paul and the dialectics of race. The Library of New Testament Studies. Vol. 410. London; New York: T&T Clark. ISBN 9780567462749. OCLC 310401973.
- ——— (2018). Can White People Be Saved?: triangulating race, theology. Downer's Grove, IL: InterVarsity Press. ISBN 9780830851041. OCLC 1032571865.
- ——— (2022). Race and Rhyme: rereading the New Testament. Grand Rapids, MI: Eerdmans. ISBN 9780802867131. OCLC 1295351711.
