= Israel Galindo =

Israel Galindo is a Christian educator whose primary focus is on teaching and researching congregational and organizational leadership, as well as Bowen Family Systems theory, to leaders at all points of their lives. His current work emphasizes the importance of lifelong learning to promote healthy and effective leaders functioning in home and work settings.

== Career ==
Galindo received a B.A. from Northeastern College (1977) and a M.R.E. (1979), M.Div. (1981) and Ed.D. (1987) from New Orleans Baptist Theological Seminary. He began his professional career as a Principal-Administrator for Horeb Christian School (1987-1991). He then served as a chaplain at VITAS Innovative Hospice Care (1991-1993) before moving to parish work, where he was the Pastoral Associate for Christian Education at Vienna Baptist Church (1993-1999). Galindo then moved into the academic field where he served as Dean and Professor of Christian Formation and Leadership at Baptist Theological Seminary at Richmond in Virginia (1999-2013). He currently serves as the Associate Dean for Lifelong Learning and Director of Online Education at Columbia Theological Seminary. He is also the Executive Director for Educational Consultants, Inc and is on the faculty for the Leadership In Ministry Workshops.

Galindo is a consultant to non-profits and theological schools in organizational development and leadership, and curriculum development and assessment. He writes the Blog for Theological School Deans for the Wabash Center for Teaching and Learning in Religion and Theology.

== Thought ==
Galindo sees education as a lifelong process, especially within the Church. He emphasizes the importance of understanding a comprehensive view of the "corporate nature of church relationships and the invisible dynamics at play." He uses Bowen Family Systems Theory to understand the dynamics of various congregations and how best to nurture their growth. He has written on these aspects of education as well as others in a variety of publications that are widely used.

== Works ==
- When A Pastor is Fired: Addressing the Silent Epidemic of Clergy Forced Termination.(Didache Press, 2025)
- Reframing Ministry Leadership.(Didache Press, 2023)
- Leadership in Ministry: Bowen Theory in the Congregational Context. (Didache Press, 2017)
- Seeking the Holy: The History and Practice of Spiritual Direction. (Educational Consultants, 2015)
- Stories of the Desert Fathers: Ancient Wit and Wisdom for Today's Bewildering Times (Educational Consultants, 2015)
- Mastering the Art of Instruction: The 9 Essential Skills Every Teacher Must Master (Educational Consultants, 2015)
- A Guide to Course Design and Assessment of Student Learning (BTSR, 2009)
- Perspectives on Congregational Leadership (Educational Consultants, 2009)
- The Hidden Lives of Congregations (Alban Institute, 2004). Named one of the “Ten Best Books of 2005’ by the Academy of Parish Clergy
- A Family Genogram Workbook (Educational Consultants 2006)
- How To Be the Best Christian Study Group Leader (Judson Press 2006)
- The Craft of Christian Teaching (Judson Press, 1998)
- Let Us Pray (Judson Press, 1999)
- The Bible Live! Experience-Centered Activities for Children (Judson Press, 1999)
- The Tree of All Hearts: Modern Parables for Teaching Faith (Smyth & Helwys, 2001)
- A Christian Educator’s Book of Lists (Smyth & Helwys, 2002)
- El Arte de la Ensenanza Cristiana (Judson Press, 2002)
- 10 Best Parenting Ways to Ruin Your Child (Educational Consultants Publishing, 2001)
- Myths: Fact and Fiction about Teaching and Learning (Educational Consultants, 2005)
- 10 Best Parenting Ways to Ruin Your Teenager (Educational Consultants, 2005)
- "Spiritual Direction and Pastoral Care", in Spiritual Direction and the Care of Souls, Moon and Benner, eds. (Intervarsity Press 2004)
- "Methods of Christian Education Toward Christian Spiritual Formation", Review & Expositor(Fall 2001)
- "Pastoral Counseling and Spiritual Direction: Addressing the Needs of the Spirit", Journal of Pastoral Care(Winter, 1997)
