= Laura S. Mendenhall =

Laura S. Mendenhall is an ordained minister in the Presbyterian Church USA and was previously the president of Columbia Theological Seminary. She is now the Senior Philanthropy Advisor for the Texas Presbyterian Foundation.

Her past research has included how the role of the sacraments fit into the life of the church, how the use of daily prayer can help in structuring Christian community, and finding strategies for faithful proclamation of Christian stewardship.

== Education ==
Mendenhall completed her undergraduate studies from Austin College, where she received a B.A. in 1969. Austin College also gave her an Honorary Doctorate in 2000. She then studied at Presbyterian School of Education and received an M.A. in 1971. In 1980, she received her M.Div. from San Francisco Theological Seminary and then proceed to earn a D.Min. from Austin Theological Seminary in 1997.

== Professional career ==
Throughout her career, she has worked at a number of churches. She has served as an associate pastor for churches in Florida, Texas, and California; from 1983 to 1986, she was the first woman to serve as associate pastor at Central Presbyterian Church in Austin, Texas. In March 1991, she became the first woman Pastor (Head of Staff) at Westminster Presbyterian Church in Austin, Texas. After serving the church for nine years, she took a position at Columbia Theological Seminary, where she became the first woman president. She is now the Senior Philanthropy Advisor for the Texas Presbyterian Foundation. Here she is raising the level of philanthropy in the Synod and is also helping write and test curriculum that informs and inspires Christian families in the process of creating both material and spiritual legacies. She does still continue her work as a pastor as well, as the part-time Designated Pastor at Presbyterian Church of Lake Travis.

She is also a sought after speaker and preacher for conferences and seminaries across the country that are part of the Presbyterian Church USA. These include Princeton Summer Institute, Union Theological Seminary, as well as Worship and Music Conferences at Montreat Conference Center, Mo Ranch Conference Center, and Westminster Conference Center. Additionally, she was a very important part of the Presbyterian General Assembly as the Moderator for the Permanent Judicial Commission from 1999 to 2001.

She has written for a number of resources such as, Mission Yearbook of Prayer, Reformed Liturgy and Music, and the Celebrate curriculum. Mendenhall has also written the book, Study Guide to Holy Baptism and Services for the Renewal of Baptism (Supplemental Liturgical Resource 2)(Presbyterian Church, 1987).
