= Ben Mathes =

Ben Mathes is an ordained minister in the Presbyterian Church (USA) who has been actively involved in providing health care in remote regions throughout the world.

He is the founder and president of “Rivers of the World”, an international exploration and development agency that focuses on remote river basins.

He graduated from Rhodes College and earned his Master of Divinity at Columbia Theological Seminary. He finished as a Doctor of Humane Letters at Hampden-Sydney College and a Doctor of Divinity at Washington College.

His work has its focus on a large number of remote areas in several nations, including Zaire, Haiti, Korea, Taiwan and Japan.

Mathes was honored by Rotary International with an Honorary Membership in appreciation for his work fighting polio and river blindness. He received an Honorary Doctor of Humane Letters (L.D.H.) from Hampden-Sydney College in May, 1999.
