= Anna Carter Florence =

American biblical scholar and minister

Anna Carter Florence is the Peter Marshall Professor of Preaching at Columbia Theological Seminary and an ordained minister in the Presbyterian Church (USA). She is known for her work on the historical, theological, aesthetic, and performative dimensions of preaching.

== Career ==
Anna Carter Florence received a B.A. from Yale University (1984), an M.Div from Princeton Theological Seminary (1988), and a Ph.D. from Princeton Theological Seminary (2000). She was ordained in the Presbyterian Church (USA) in 1988 by the Presbytery of the Twin Cities Area. She was an Associate Pastor for Youth and Young Adults at Westminster Presbyterian Church, Minneapolis, Minnesota (1988–1993), before becoming a Teaching Assistant in Preaching (1993–1996) and Instructor in Preaching (1997) at Princeton Theological Seminary. Beginning in 1998, Anna Carter Florence became an instructor in Preaching at Columbia Theological Seminary, where she has since held the positions of assistant professor of Preaching (2000–2006), Associate Professor of Preaching (2006–2008), and Peter Marshall Associate Professor of Preaching (2008–2016). She currently serves as the Peter Marshall Professor of Preaching at Columbia Theological Seminary.

== Thought ==
Anna Carter Florence has focused much of her research on testimony, feminist theology, and the relationship of preaching to other fields and traditions. In addition to teaching and lecturing around the world on these topics, she has written several books and contributed a number of chapters and essays to others. She is also a frequent contributor to Lectionary Homiletics and other journals.

She is a proponent of preaching as both testimony and witness, as well as a proponent of preaching exegetical sermons based on the texts provided in the lectionary. She believes that "the authority for authentic preaching is based on the depth of the preacher's engagement with the text. It is the job of the preacher to encounter the text on a personal level and then testify to what he/she has seen and heard." She advocates preachers to think of themselves as "people who have seen and heard something, and who have to tell about it. We are the people who pay attention in the first place: we pay attention to sacred texts and to human life, and then we try to describe what we see, even when it is beyond belief.” Anna Carter Florence has also developed the method of reading biblical scripture by focusing on the verbs that are given and chosen by the characters. She states, "It's what we do and don't do that preoccupies human beings. And it's the verbs we cannot imagine for ourselves (live, liberate, forgive, resurrect) that the church offers, and that we reach for, week after week."

== Publications ==
- Preaching as Testimony. Westminster John Knox Press, 2007.
- Inscribing the Word: Sermons and Prayers of Walter Brueggemann. Editor. Fortress, 2004.
- The Word in Rehearsal. The Lyman Beecher Lectures in Preaching. Westminster John Knox Press (forthcoming).
- A is for Alabaster: An Alphabet of Preachers (New Testament). Twenty-six “preachers” (one for each letter of the alphabet) drawn from New Testament texts, each of whom shows a different angle of the richly diverse homiletics at work in scripture. (forthcoming).
- Lectionary Homiletics, 2007–2008, Year A: A Liturgical Year of 1000 word essays
- Put Away Your Sword! Taking the Torture out of the Sermon, in What's the Matter with Preaching Today? edited by Mike Graves. Westminster John Knox Press, 2004.
- "Preaching IS Personal," in Preaching and the Personal, edited by J. Dwayne Howell. Wipf and Stock (forthcoming in 2012).
- "Preacher as One 'Out of Your Mind,'" in Slow of Speech and Unclean Lips, edited by Robert Stephen Reid. Wipf and Stock, 2010.
- "Who do you say that I am? Luke 9:18-27," in Preaching the Incarnation, edited by Peter K. Stevenson. Westminster John Knox Press, 2010.
- "Put Away Your Sword! Taking the Torture out of the Sermon," in What's the Matter with Preaching Today? edited by Mike Graves. Westminster John Knox Press, 2004.
- "The Preaching Imagination," in Teaching Preaching as a Christian Practice: A New Approach to Homiletical Pedagogy, edited by Thomas G. Long and Leonora Tubbs Tisdale. Westminster John Knox Press, 2008.
- "The Voice You Find May Be Your Own," in Get Up Off Your Knees! Preaching the U2 Catalogue, edited by Raewynne J. Whitely. Cowley, 2003.
- "Mud and Meeting People," in Renewing the Vision: Reformed Faith for the 21st Century, edited by Cynthia M. Campbell. Geneva Press, 2000.
- "Fourth Sunday of Advent," in The Abingdon Women's Preaching Annual, Series 2, Year B, edited by Leonora Tubbs Tisdale. Abingdon, 1999.
- "Second Sunday of Easter," in The Abingdon Women's Preaching Annual, Series 2, Year B, edited by Leonora Tubbs Tisdale. Abingdon, 1999.
- "The River's Edge," in A Chorus of Witnesses: Model Sermons for Today's Preacher, edited by Thomas G. Long and Cornelius Plantinga. Eerdmans, 1994.
- "The River's Edge," in Sacred Strands, edited by Barbara Mraz. Lone Oak Press, 1991.
- "7 Essential Books for Preaching," in The Christian Century, Oct. 20, 2009.
- "Homiletical Perspective: John 3:1-17," in Feasting on the Word: Preaching the Revised Common Lectionary, Year A, Vol. 2 (X), edited by David Bartlett and Barbara Brown Taylor. Westminster John Knox Press, 2011.
- "Homiletical Perspective: John 4:5-42" in Feasting on the Word: Preaching the Revised Common Lectionary, Year A, Vol. 2 (X), edited by David Bartlett and Barbara Brown Taylor. Westminster John Knox Press, 2011.
- "Homiletical Perspective: John 9:1-41," in Feasting on the Word: Preaching the Revised Common Lectionary, Year A, Vol. 2 (X), edited by David Bartlett and Barbara Brown Taylor. Westminster John Knox Press, 2011.
- "A Prodigal Preaching Story: Paul, Eutychus, and Bored-to-Death Youth," in Theology Today, 64.2 (2007).
- "You Are Out of Your Mind," in Journal for Preachers (Advent, 2004).
- "Smashing Beauty," in Journal for Preachers (Pentecost, 2004).
- "Blessing the Way: Birth, Infinity and Beyond," in Journal for Preachers (Advent, 2003).
- "The Liquid Church: Before the Flood," in Journal for Preachers (Advent, 2002).
- "The Liquid Church: After the Flood," in Journal for Preachers (Advent, 2002).
- "Bread on the Water," in Cloud of Witnesses, Vol. I: An Audio Journal on Youth, Church and Culture. The Institute for Youth Ministry, Princeton Theological Seminary, 2000.
- "Preaching to the Exiles Who Live at Home: Youth, Testimony, and a Homiletic of 'True Speech'" in Journal for Preachers (Advent, 2000).
- "The Woman Who Just Said No," in Journal for Preachers (Advent, 1999).
- "The Voice You Find May Be Your Own," in The Princeton Seminary Bulletin, December 1996.
