= Martha L. Moore-Keish =

American theologian

Martha L. Moore-Keish (/kɛʃ/ KESH) is an American theologian ordained in the Presbyterian Church (U.S.A.). Her work is primarily focused on Reformed theology, liturgical theology and ecumenical theology, including engagement with interfaith issues around the world. She currently engages this work as the J.B. Green Associate Professor of Theology at Columbia Theological Seminary.

== Career ==
Moore-Keish received a A.B. from Harvard University (1989), a M.Div. from Union Theological Seminary (1994) and a Ph.D. from Emory University (2000). Additionally, she spent a year of study at Visva-Bharati University in West Bengal, India (1989–90). Ordained as a minister of Word and Sacrament in the Presbyterian Church (U.S.A.) she began her career as the Associate for Worship in the Presbyterian Church (U.S.A.) Office of Theology and Worship (2000-2003) before becoming the Assistant Professor of Liturgical Studies at Yale Divinity School and Yale Institute of Sacred Music (2003-2004). She currently serves as the J.B. Green Associate Professor of Theology at Columbia Theological Seminary.

== Thought ==
Moore-Keish has encouraged greater emphasis on Reformed and liturgical theology specifically in the area of worship. In addition to her work on sacramental theology she states, "worship is, for most of us, the most common way that we shape faith. If we take an interest in shaping worship, and in engaging all people fully in worship, we have a better chance of deepening Christian faith." She extends beyond her own Reformed religious tradition and has sought to build relationships between various traditions. As part of the World Communion of Reformed Churches she co-chairs the International Reformed-Catholic Dialogue, which seeks to bring these two traditions together in an effort for the Christian community to become a greater agent of justice.

== Personal ==
Martha Moore-Keish is married to Chris Moore-Keish, a fellow minister of word and sacrament in the Presbyterian Church (USA). The two have two daughters, Miriam Moore-Keish and Fiona Moore-Keish.

== Work ==
- Christian Prayer for Today. Westminster John Knox Press, 2009.
- Do This in Remembrance of Me: A Ritual Approach to Reformed Eucharistic Theology. Eerdmans Publishing Company, 2008.
- John Calvin and Reformed Protestantism: A Catalogue of Sixteenth and Early Seventeenth Century Imprints in the Library of Union Theological Seminary in Virginia. [With Robert Benedetto] Richmond: Union Theological Seminary in Virginia, 1994.
- “20th Century and Contemporary Protestant SacramentalTheology,” In The Oxford Handbook of Sacramental Theology, ed. Matthew Levering and Hans Boersma [With George Hunsinger]. Oxford University Press, 2015.
- “Interreligious ritual participation: Insights from inter-Christian ritual participation.” In Ritual Participation and Interreligious Dialogue: Boundaries, Transgressions, and Innovations, edited by Marianne Moyaert and Joris Geldhof. Bloomsbury Publishing, 2015.
- “Eucharist: The Table that Unites and Divides the Church.” In What Does it Mean to “Do This”? Supper, Mass, Eucharist, edited by Michael Root and James J. Buckley. Pro Ecclesia series. Wipf and Stock, 2014.
- “The One, Wounded, Baptized Body: A Memoir of Participation in the U.S. Reformed-Roman Catholic Dialogue (2003-2010),” In Worship and Culture: Foreign Country or Homeland? edited by Glaucia Vasconcelos Wilkey. Eerdmans Publishing Company, 2014.
- “Karl Barth and John Thatamanil: Two Theologians against Religion.” Bangalore Theological Forum, June 2014. Also forthcoming in Always Being Reformed, edited by David Jenson. Wipf & Stock Publishers, 2016.
- “Starting with Epiclesis: The Holy Spirit in Recent Reformed-Roman Catholic Dialogue.” Call to Worship 45.3 (2011): 1–7.
- “The Grace and Ambiguity of Worship: What Can Catholics Learn from Protestant Liturgy?” Liturgical Ministry, Summer 2010.
- “A Christian Ordo? Presentation for the Scandal of Particularity: A Jewish-Christian Conversation.” Interpretation, July 2010.
- “What Does the Lord Require? Do Justice.” In Journal for Preachers (Pentecost 2010).
- “Calvin as Liturgical Theologian: What the Reformer Might Teach Us about Doing Theology and Doing Worship Today.” Call to Worship: Liturgy, Music, Preaching, and the Arts (September 2009).
- “Pentecost in India: What Does the Birthday of the Church Mean for Churchless Christians?” Journal for Preachers, Pentecost 2009.
- “Creation and New Creation in Baptism.” In Theology in Service of the Church: Essays in Honor of Joseph D. Small, III. Westminster John Knox Press, 2008.
- “Baptism in the Presbyterian and Reformed Tradition.” In Baptism Today: Understanding, Practice, Ecumenical Implications, edited by Thomas F. Best. WCC Faith and Order Paper no. 207. Collegeville, MN: Liturgical Press, 2008.
- “Marriage: A New Way of Life?” In Call to Worship: Liturgy, Music, Preaching, and the Arts 41.3 (February 2008).
- “Death in the Midst of Life, Life in the Midst of Death: Preaching and Worship in the Easter Season.” In Journal for Preachers, Winter 2007.
- “The Importance of Worship that Centers on the Ordo.” Liturgy 21:2 (2006): 15–23.
- “Resurrection and Religious Otherness.” Presbyterian Outlook, Easter 2011.
- “Eucharist ≈ Eschatology,” in A More Profound Alleluia: Theology and Worship in Harmony, edited by Leanne Van Dyk. Grand Rapids: Eerdmans Publishing Company, 2005.
- “How Shall We Worship?” in Conversations with the Confessions: Dialogue in the Reformed Tradition, edited by Joseph D. Small. Louisville: Geneva Press, 2005.
- Sermons for Baptism of the Lord and Christ the King Sundays in Abingdon Women’s Preaching Annual (Series 3, Year A), edited by Beverly Zink-Sawyer. Nashville: Abingdon Press, 2004.
- “Common Worship in the Presbyterian Church (USA)”. Liturgy 18:4 (2003).
- “Calvin, Sacraments, and Ecclesiology: What Makes a Church a Church?” In Call to Worship: Liturgy, Music, Preaching, and the Arts 36:1 (2002–03): 25–41. Also published in Proceedings of the North American Academy of Liturgy, 2002.
- “Washing Before Supper?” In Reformed Liturgy and Music 34.4 (2000): 15–21.
- “Good News for New Parents: What Do New Parents Need in Worship?” In Reformed Liturgy and Music XXXI, no. 4 (Winter 1997): 242–245.
- “Interfaith Conversation and Cooperation.” In Religions of Atlanta: Religious Diversity in the Centennial Olympic City, ed. Gary Laderman. Atlanta: Scholars Press, 1996.
- Contributor, Feasting on the Word (Westminster John Knox, 2008–2011).
- Essays on “Theological Themes” for Lectionary Homiletics (December 2006).
- “Between Text and Sermon.” Interpretation (October 2006).
