= Deborah Flemister Mullen =

Retired US professor

Deborah Flemister Mullen is an ordained pastor in the Presbyterian Church (U.S.A.) and a theological educator, specifically in the fields of modern American Christianity and Black Church Studies. She retired in January 2018 as Vice President for Equity, Diversity, and Inclusion and Associate Professor of American Christianity and Black Church Studies at Columbia Theological Seminary. Her work actively engages the ongoing debates in American religion and civil society surrounding race, sexuality and social justice. In the academic field she focuses on the creation and leading of graduate theological education curriculum that prepares religious leaders for ministries throughout the world and promotes growth in academic institutions.

== Career ==
Mullen received a B.A. from the University of Rochester (1972), an M.Div. from Colgate Rochester Divinity School/Bexley Hall/Crozer Theological Seminary (1982) and a Ph.D. from The Divinity School at the University of Chicago (2003). She was ordained in the Presbyterian Church (U.S.A.) (1983) and served as the Interim/Stated Supply Pastor for Trinity Emmanuel Presbyterian Church (1983-1987). In 1987, she moved to the University of Rochester where she became the Associate Dean of Students and Director of Minority Student Affairs (1987-1989). She also taught there as a Senior Lecturer in the Department of Religious and Classical Studies. Mullen also served as the Dean of Masters Level Programs and the Associate Professor of Ministry and Historical Studies at McMcCormick Theological Seminary (1989-2010). Here she also served as the Founding Director of the Center for African American Ministries and Black Church Studies. She then moved to Columbia Theological Seminary where she was appointed Dean of Faculty, Executive Vice President and Associate Professor of American Christianity and Black Church Studies. With this appointment, Mullen became the first African American woman to hold the position of chief academic officer at any of the ten seminaries of the Presbyterian Church (U.S.A.). During her time at Columbia Theological Seminary, she also served briefly as the Acting President before the appointment of an Interim President before becoming Vice President for Equity, Diversity, and Inclusion.

== Thought ==
Mullen has served the Presbyterian Church (U.S.A.) in a variety of national leadership roles and internationally at ecumenical gatherings sponsored by the World Council of Churches, but she has been primarily active in giving greater visibility to a number of critical issues affecting African Americans and other communities of color, as well as in civil rights across the lines of gender, race, and sexuality. She is a strong proponent for social justice and equality through her teaching and writings.

== Works ==
- “A Time For Openness” in Presbyterian Survey, (1989).
- Ordination: Past, Present, and Future, Co-editor with Jack Rogers, (1990).
- “Sharing the Fire, The Question of Advocacy" in Out of the Ashes, (1997).
- “Baptism: Sacrament of Struggle and Rite of Resistance” in Ending Racism in the Church, (1998).
- “Eugene Carson Blake: The Public Witness of the Church” in The Journal of Presbyterian History, (1998).
- “Through Times of Challenge, Controversy and Hope” in Renewing The Vision: Reformed Faith for the 21st Century, (2000).
- “From Sideline to Center: Teaching and Learning For a Racially and Culturally Diverse Church” in Shaping Beloved Community: Multicultural Education, (2006).
