= Sara Myers =

American librarian

- Occupation: Librarian

Academic background
- Education: Florida University; UNC-Chapel Hill; Emory University

Academic work
- Discipline: Library science
- Institutions: Duke University; Emory University; Iliff School of Theology; Columbia Theological Seminary; American Theological Library Association

Sara J. Myers is a professor emerita at Columbia Theological Seminary and former president of the American Theological Library Association. She has been the Director of numerous libraries, as well as taught at a number of universities across the country.

== Education ==
Sara Myers first received her Bachelor of Arts from Florida University in 1970. She then earned her master's degree in Library Sciences in 1972 at the University of North Carolina at Chapel Hill, followed by a Doctor of Philosophy in 1990 from Emory University.

== Career ==
In 1972 she began her work at Duke University as a Cataloger. She briefly held this same position at Pitts Library at Emory University, where she held various positions. These positions included Reference Librarian, Assistant Librarian for Public Services, and Acting Librarian. At the Iliff School of Theology and Union Theological Seminary she served as both the Director and a professor of Theological Bibliography. After her service at both of these schools she moved and became the Director and Professor of Theological Bibliography of the John Bulow Campbell Library at Columbia Theological Seminary. Here she retired and earned the title of professor emerita.

She has published a number of articles and presentations. She was a frequent contributor to The ALA Yearbook of Library and Information Services: A Review of Library Events. Her research includes women in American society, religious biography and autobiography. As a result, she also served as an editor and writer in Encyclopedia of Women and Religion in North America, volume 1.

=== American Theological Library Association ===
Myers has served as both the President and Vice President, in addition to serving on the board of directors for five years. As a member of the Special Committee of the Association for International Collaboration she was also instrumental in outreach and international awareness. She sought to increase cooperation between theological libraries across the world and support cooperative projects between the ATLA and other foreign theological library associations.
