= Marcia Bunge =

American theologian

Marcia J. Bunge
- Born: 1954 (age 71–72)
- Education: Ph.D. (1986), M.A. (1979), University of Chicago; B.A. in English and Music (1976), St. Olaf College
- Occupations: Theologian, professor, author
- Notable work: The Child in Christian Thought, The Child in the Bible
- Theological work
- Tradition or movement: Lutheranism

Marcia J. Bunge (born 1954) is an American Lutheran theologian. She is Professor of Religion and the Bernhardson Distinguished Chair of Lutheran Studies at Gustavus Adolphus College in St. Peter, Minnesota.

== Biography ==
A graduate of St. Olaf College (majoring in English and Music) and a member of Phi Beta Kappa, Bunge earned her M.A. and Ph.D. from the University of Chicago, specializing in hermeneutics and historical theology. Before accepting the Bernhardson Chair, she taught at Luther Seminary (1985–1990), Luther College (1990–1995), Gustavus Adolphus College (1995–1997), and Christ College, the Honors College of Valparaiso University (1997–2012). She has also pursued research and been a visiting professor at several academic institutions in Germany. Over the past few years, Bunge has spoken and published widely on various religious perspectives on children and obligations to them, editing or co-editing and contributing to five foundational volumes on childhood: Nordic Childhoods 1750–1960: From Folk Beliefs to Pippi Longstocking; Children, Adults, and Shared Responsibilities: Jewish, Christian, and Muslim Perspectives; Children and Childhood in World Religions: Primary Sources and Texts; The Child in the Bible; and The Child in Christian Thought (Eerdmans, 2001).

Bunge's work on religious understandings of children and childhood has been supported by various grants totaling nearly $700,000. As a professor and mother of two children, she is both personally and professionally committed to promoting children's well-being through her scholarship, teaching, and advocacy. She regularly speaks about her work in the United States and abroad and has participated in child-focused conferences and consultations on six continents. Dr. Bunge has served on a number of national and international committees and boards, including the board of the International Herder Society; the board of the Child Theology Movement; the steering committees of the Childhood Studies program units of both the American Academy of Religion and the Society of Biblical Literature; and the editorial board of Child Abuse and Neglect: The International Journal. She was a Kempe-Haruv Fellow for an international initiative on child protection and a Theological Contributor to the Joint Statement of the World Council of Churches and UNICEF on Child Protection (2016). She has served as an Extraordinary Professor at North-West University in South Africa (2014–2020) and as a core collaborator and consultant for an international and interdisciplinary project on “New Perspectives on Childhood in Early Europe” funded by a 1.3 million dollar grant from the Norwegian Research Council, directed by Professor Reidar Aasgaard, and hosted by the University of Oslo, Norway (2013–2017).

In addition to being a scholar and a teacher, Dr. Bunge is a deeply committed Lutheran theologian who is highly informed and enthusiastic about the aims of church-related higher education. She was a founding member of the Rhodes Consultation on the Future of the Church-Related College, an ecumenical and national initiative funded by the Lilly Endowment. She directed the planning grant for Valparaiso University's two million dollars “Theological Exploration of Vocation” project, served on the National Task Force on Education of the Evangelical Lutheran Church in America, and was a lead grant writer for the “Gustavus Academy for Faith, Science, and Ethics.” She is also the translator and editor of a collection of essays by the Lutheran theologian J.G. Herder titled Against Pure Reason: Writings on History, Language, and Religion (Fortress Press, 1993; reprint: Wipf and Stock, 2005). She continues to speak and write about Lutheran understandings of education, vocation, and interfaith relationships, and she edited a collection of essays on the Lutheran heritage of Gustavus titled Rooted in Heritage, Open to the World: Reflections on the Distinctive Character of Gustavus Adolphus College (Lutheran University Press, 2017).

== Published works ==
1. Nordic Childhoods 1750–1960: From Folk Beliefs to Pippi Longstocking. Co-edited by Marcia J. Bunge, Reidar Aasgaard, and Merethe Roos. New York, NY: Routledge, 2018.
2. Rooted in Heritage, Open to the World: Reflections on the Distinctive Character of Gustavus Adolphus College. Edited and introduced by Marcia J. Bunge. Minneapolis, MN: Lutheran University Press, 2017. Marcia J. Bunge, Ph.D. Page 4 of 12
3. Children, Adults, and Shared Responsibilities: Jewish, Christian, and Muslim Perspectives. Edited and introduced by Marcia J. Bunge. Cambridge, England: Cambridge University Press, 2012.
4. Children and Childhood in World Religions: Primary Sources and Texts. Edited and introduced by Don Browning and Marcia J. Bunge. New Brunswick, NJ: Rutgers University Press: 2009. Paperback, 2011.
5. The Child in the Bible. General Editor: Marcia J. Bunge. Co-editors: Terence Fretheim and Beverly Roberts Gaventa. Grand Rapids, MI: Eerdmans, 2008.
6. The Child in Christian Thought. Edited and introduced by Marcia Bunge. Grand Rapids, MI: Eerdmans, 2001.
7. Against Pure Reason: Writings on History, Language, and Religion by J. G. Herder. Edited, translated, and introduced by Marcia J. Bunge. Minneapolis, MN: Fortress Press, 1993. Reprint: Wipf and Stock, 2005.
