= Leanne Van Dyk =

Leanne Van Dyk (born 1955 in Grand Rapids, Michigan) is an American reformed theologian and theological educator. She has focused much of her work on atonement theology and the development of theological education. She is the tenth president of Columbia Theological Seminary.

== Career ==
Van Dyk received a B.A. from Calvin College (1977), an M.A. from Western Michigan University (1982), an M.Div. from Calvin Theological Seminary (1987) from which she was recently given the Distinguished Alumni Award, and a Ph.D. from Princeton Theological Seminary (1992). She additionally spent a year studying at the Theologische Hogeschool van de Gereformeerde Kerken in het Nederland, Kampen, The Netherlands (1985). In 2007, she was ordained in the Presbyterian Church (USA). After earning her Ph.D. she served as Assistant Professor of Theology (1992-1995) and the Associate Professor of Theology (1995-1998) at San Francisco Theological Seminary. At this time she was also a member of the Core Doctoral Faculty at Graduate Theological Union (1995-1998). Beginning in 1998, she served as Associate Professor of Reformed Theology (1998-2000) and the Professor of Reformed Theology (2000-2015) at Western Theological Seminary. While at Western Theological Seminary Van Dyk also served as the Dean of the Faculty(2002-2005), the Academic Dean(2005-2006), and the Dean and Vice President of Academic Affairs(2006-2015). On July 1, 2015 she began serving as the tenth president of Columbia Theological Seminary.

== Thought ==
Van Dyk is a strong advocate for theological education. Before she earned her M.Div. she taught elementary school and has recognized the importance of education at all levels. She has written several books and contributed many articles and chapters to a number of publications. She is also on the Board of Editors for the Scottish Journal of Theology and has served on the editorial board for Perspectives, the Journal of Reformed Thought.

As a theological educator Van Dyk is a strong proponent of theology addressing the present needs of the church. She believes, "Theology is articulating the faith of the church for each new age. When it is grounded in scripture, responsive to the needs of the church, and open to the leading of the Holy Spirit, it fulfills its task as a servant of the church. My own call to ministry is to help students see the great beauty, drama, and strength of the gospel—and then, how to express the gospel for the church today." She has supported racial-ethnic diversity, leading the Faculty Fellow program at Western Theological Seminary, in which racial-ethnic scholars are brought into the community to teach while working on their Ph.D.

Van Dyk has continually sought to reform theological education through a number of organizations and programs to address the current needs of the church and the world. She serves as a member of the Board of Commissioners of the Association of Theological Schools, and has served as a member of the Catechism Committee for the Presbyterian Church (USA) Office of Theology and Worship, and as a member of the Re-Forming Ministry project where she helped "forge new patterns of shared theological work, exploring ecclesiological issues from national, congregational, seminary and judicatory perspectives."

== Publications ==
- A More Profound Alleluia: Theology and Worship in Harmony, Eerdmans Publishing Co., 2005.
- Believing in Jesus Christ, Geneva Press, 2002.
- The Desire of Divine Love: The Atonement Theology of John McLeod Campbell, Peter Lang Publishers, 1995.
- A Proposal for Pedagogical Strategies in Theological Education in the Reformed Tradition from Reformed Theology; Identity and Ecumenicity, ed. Wallace Alston and Michael Welker, Eerdmans Publishing Co., 2003.
- The Second Word, in The Ten Commandments for Jews, Christians, and Others, ed. Roger Van Harn, Eerdmans Publishing Co., 2000.
- Toward a New Typology of Reformed Doctrines of Atonement in Toward the Future of Reformed Theology, edited by David Willis and Michael Welker, Eerdmans Publishing Co., 1999.
- Atonement Theology and the Task of Discernment, The Catalyst, November, 1999.
- Vision and Imagination in Atonement Doctrine, Theology Today, April 1993.
