= Jeffery Tribble =

American minister and professor

Jeffery Tribble is an ordained elder in the African Methodist Episcopal Zion Church (A.M.E. Zion Church) and a professor of ministry with research interests in Practical Theology, Congregational Studies and Leadership, Ethnography, Evangelism and Church Planting, Black Church Studies, and Urban Church Ministry. Academics and professionals in these fields consider him a renowned thought leader. Tribble's experience in pastoral ministry allows for his work to bridge the gap between academic research and practical church leadership.

== Career ==
Tribble received a B.S. from Howard University (1981), a Black Minister's Program Certificate from Hartford Seminary (1985), a M.Div. from Garrett-Evangelical Theological Seminary (1990), and a Ph.D. from Northwestern University (2002). He began his work in the African Methodist Episcopal Zion Church as a minister of membership development at Martin Temple A.M.E. Zion Church in Chicago, Illinois (1990–1991). Tribble was ordained as an elder in 1992, when he then served as the pastor at St. Andrew A.M.E. Zion Church in Gary, Indiana (1991–1997). He has also served in the A.M.E. Zion Church as a pastor at St. Mark church in Chicago, Illinois (1997–2000), co-pastor at New vision Church in Suwanee, Georgia (2007–2008), Associate pastor at Greater Walters church in Chicago, Illinois (2006–2007), the minister of evangelism and men's ministry and founding Dean of the Life Development Institute at Martin Temple Church in Chicago, Illinois (2000–2006), and as the presiding elder for the A.M.E. Zion Church for the Augusta District (2008–2013) and the Atlanta District (2013–present).

He began his career as an academic at Garrett-Evangelical Theological Seminary where he served as adjunct faculty (1999–2000, 2008 and 2009), Instructor of Congregational Ministries and Director of Teaching Parishes and Congregational Research (July 2000 – June 2003) and assistant professor of Congregational Leadership and Director of the Center for the Church and the Black Experience (July 2003 – June 2007). He has been a lecturer at Apex School of Theology in Durham, NC (2009). He joined the faculty of Columbia Theological Seminary as assistant professor of Ministry (2007–2012).

He currently still serves at Columbia Theological Seminary where he is now the associate professor of Ministry. He is also Presiding Elder for the Atlanta District, Georgia Annual Conference and Candidate for Bishop in the African Methodist Episcopal Zion Church for 2016.

== Thought ==
Tribble is a strong proponent of the transformative leadership idea. He has written extensively about how leaders, especially those who work in the church, should be open to transformation themselves as they transform the community they are leading. He writes about this specifically from the perspective of the Black Church in two of his books, Transformative Pastoral Leadership in the Black Church and Joining Jesus: A Class Manual for initiation into Christian Discipleship and Welcome into the African Methodist Episcopal Zion Church. From this point of view he emphasizes his research on how the Black Church "must continue its historic mission of being an instrument of survival, elevation, and liberation for its people." He however does not limit his research just to the Black Church, he pushes for transformative leadership between various religious traditions as well. He has published numerous books, articles, and chapters that are used in this context by people and institutions across the world and across denominational lines.

== Publications ==
- Joining Jesus: A Class Manual for Initiation into Christian Discipleship and Welcome into the African Methodist Episcopal Zion Church, Charlotte, NC, Christian Education Department, African Methodist Episcopal Zion Church, 2006.
- Transformative Pastoral Leadership in the Black Church, Second ed. Dwight N. Hopkins and Linda E. Thomas, Black Religion, Womanist Thought, and Social Justice Series, New York, Palgrave-Macmillan Press, 2005.
- "Evangelism" in The Wiley-Blackwell Companion to Practical Theology, ed. Bonnie MillerMcLemore. Oxford, England: Blackwell Publishing, 2011, pp 318–327.
- "Embodying Sankofa: When Ancient Ways Inform the Church's Future" in Greenhouses of Hope: Congregations Growing Young Leaders Who will Change the World, ed. Dori Grienenko Baker, Hendon, Virginia: The Alban Institute, 2011, pp 137–164.
- "Ethnographic Research on African American Pastoral Leadership and Congregations" in Ethnography as Christian Theology and Ethics, ed. Christian Scharen and Aana Marie Vigen, New York: Continuum, 2011, pp 77–96.
- "Multiple Paths to Ministry: New Models for Theological Education," Teaching Theology and Religion, April 2008.
- "Congregations in America," Review of Religious Research, Mar. 2005, Vol 46, Issue 3, p 316–317.
- "Tuesday, January 3, 2012" meditation in Prophecy and Expectation 2011: An Advent Booklet for 2011, A Guide for Meditation and Action, ed. Reginald D. Broadnax.
- "Noticing, Naming, and Nurturing our Youth" in One Hundred Days Plus of Meditation/Hymnody, Connectional Lay Council of The African Methodist Episcopal Zion Church.
- "Charge to Christian Educators of the Georgia Annual Conference" in The A.M.E. Zion Quarterly Review, Vol. CXXIV, Oct 2011
- "Becoming More Effective in Ministry in a Radically Changed Context" in The A.M.E. Zion Quarterly Review, Vol. CXXIII No.3, July 2011
- "Eighth Sunday After Epiphany" in Preaching God's Transforming Justice: A Lectionary Commentary, Year A, Featuring 22 New Holy Days for Justice, ed. Ronald F. Allen, Dale P. Andrews, and Dawn Ottoni-Wilhelm. Louisville, Kentucky: Westminster John Knox Press, 2013, pp 104–108.
- "Eighth Sunday After Epiphany" in Preaching God's Transforming Justice: A Lectionary Commentary, Year B, Featuring 22 New Holy Days for Justice, ed. Ronald F. Allen, Dale P. Andrews, and Dawn Ottoni-Wilhelm, Louisville, Kentucky: Westminster John Knox Press, 2011, pp 109–113.
- "Sankofa Moments: Re-membering the Past to Imagine, Embrace, and Live into God's Calling," Fund for Theological Education Calling Congregations Program e-journal article, Nov. 11, 2009.
- "Pastoral Perspectives for Luke 9: 28-36 (37-43)", Feasting on the Word: Preaching the Revised Common Lectionary, Year C, Volume 1, Westminster John Knox Press, 2009.
- "Pastoral Perspectives for Matthew 6: 1-6, 16-21 and Luke 4:1-13," Feasting on the Word: Preaching the Revised Common Lectionary, Year C, Volume 2, Westminster John Knox Press, 2009.
- "Pastoral Implications for Matthew 2:1-12," Lectionary Homiletics, Vol XIX, Number 1, Dec. 2007 – Jan. 2008, p. 45.
- "Pastoral Implications for Matthew 3:13-17," Lectionary Homiletics, Vol XIX, Number 1, Dec. 2007 – Jan. 2008, p. 53.
- "Pastoral Implications for John 1:29-42," Lectionary Homiletics, Vol XIX, Number 1, Dec. 2007 – Jan. 2008, p. 60-61.
- "Pastoral Implications for Matthew 4:12-23" Lectionary Homiletics, Vol XIX, Number 1, Dec. 2007 – Jan. 2008, p. 70-71.
- "The Character of a New Millennium Methodist" The A.M.E. Zion Quarterly Review, Vol. CXVI No.2, April 2004.
- "Teaching the People to Fish," The A.M.E. Zion Quarterly Review, Volume CXI No. 2, April 1999.

== Honors ==
- "Frederick Douglass Award" by the International Ministers and Lay Association of The A.M.E. Zion Church, 2014.
- "2005 Rev. Carrell Cargle One Church One School Religious Leader of the Year Award" (Christian Methodist Episcopal Church), 2005.
- Board of Directors for the United Methodist Church Publishing House, 2001–2012.
- Named one of Garrett-Evangelical Theological Seminary's 45 Outstanding Black Alums, 2016.
