= Mark Douglas (ethicist) =

Mark Douglas (born 1966) is the J. Erskine Love Professor of Christian Ethics at Columbia Theological Seminary where he directs the seminary's Center for Theology and Contested Publics. He is known for his work on religious language in the public sphere, medical and business ethics, the American philosophical tradition of pragmatism, the environment, just war and pacifism, and the role of religion in political philosophy.

== Career ==
Douglas received a B.A. with honors from Colorado College (1989), an M.Div. from Princeton Theological Seminary (1993), a Th.M. from Princeton Theological Seminary (1994), and a Ph.D. from the University of Virginia (2000). Beginning in 1997, he became an adjunct faculty member at Virginia Commonwealth University. He also served as the co-pastor at Tabor Presbyterian Church in Crozet, Virginia (1997–1999) before coming to Columbia Theological Seminary, where he took the position of assistant professor of Christian ethics in 1999.

Douglas currently still serves at Columbia Theological Seminary as professor of Christian ethics. Additionally, he has served on the boards of Georgia Interfaith Power and Light, the largest faith-based environmental organization in Georgia, the Institutional Review Board of Northside Hospital, and the Presbyterian Association for Science, Technology, and the Christian Faith. He has also served on the Investigative Panel for the State Bar of Georgia, the City of Decatur's Ethics Commission, and the City of Decatur's Climate Resilience Planning Task Force. He has also served on a wide range of commissions, committees, and task forces for both various academic guilds and the Presbyterian Church (U.S.A.).

== Thought ==
Douglas' work extends into a wide range of areas within the field of ethics. He has published numerous books and has contributed hundreds of articles and book chapters to a variety of publications. He also is the founding editor of @ This Point: theological investigations in church and culture, the online journal of Columbia Theological Seminary, and serves on a number of other editorial and professional boards.

As a Christian ethicist his main focus is integrating religion and justice both within and outside of the church. In 2015, for instance, he participated in a teach-in at Columbia Theological Seminary where he gave a lecture titled, Reformed Theology and Capital Punishment. He has also served on the Study Team on Prospects for a Just Peace in Israel and Palestine, which reported to the Advisory Committee on Social Witness Policy of the Presbyterian Church (U.S.A.). As part of the Presbyterian Church (U.S.A.) his role on this committee and others is to look "at a range of possibilities consistent with the church’s commitment to justice, peace, self determination and related values." He advocates for the Church to create "a more capacious space for disagreement which can be the starting point for learning how to live with each other."

== Honors ==
- Awarded the Nohria Family Fellowship for research on climate change and conflict (2018).
- Nominated Member, "The New Haven Theology Discussion Group" (2011–present).
- Nominated Participant, “Seminar for Mid-Career Faculty,” The Association of Theological Schools (2010).
- Participant, The Scandal of Particularity: A Jewish-Christian Conversation, Co-Sponsored by the Institute for Christian and Jewish Studies & Institute for Reformed Theology (2006–2008).
- Participant, The Caux Roundtable Scholars Retreat on Abrahamic Faiths and the Financial Crisis (2009).
- Finalist, In Character Prize for Editorial and Opinion Writing (2007).
- Columbia Theological Seminary Faculty Enhancement Grant (2002, 2005, 2007, 2013, 2018, 2022, 2025).
- Invited Participant, Seminar on Holocaust Studies at the Holocaust Museum (2002).
- Society for Values in Higher Education Fellowship (2000).

== Publications ==
- Confessing Christ in the 21st Century. Lanham, MD: Rowman and Littlefield, 2005.
- Believing Aloud: Reflections on Being Religious in the Public Square. Eugene, OR: Cascade Books, 2010.
- Christian Pacifism for an Environmental Age. Cambridge, UK: Cambridge UP, 2019.
- Modernity, the Environment, and the Christian Just War Tradition. Cambridge, UK: Cambridge UP, 2023.
- "Theological Arguments and the Case Against Capital Punishment," The Leviathan’s Choice: Capital Punishment in the 21st Century, William D. Richardson, J. Michael Martinez, and D. Brandon Hornsby, eds. (Lanham: Rowman and Littlefield, 2002).
- “Resistance, Affirmation, and the Sovereignty of God,” Resistance and Theological Ethics, Ron Stone and Robert Stivers, eds. (Lanham, MD: Rowman and Littlefield, 2004).
- “The Passions of the Reviewers,” The Passion of the Christ: Biblical and Theological Perspectives, Timothy Beale and Tod Linafelt, eds. (Chicago: Chicago UP, 2005).
- “If the church accepts homosexuality . . .,” Frequently Asked Questions About Sexuality, the Bible and the Church: Plain Talk About Tough Issues, Ted A. Smith, ed. (San Francisco: The Covenant Network, 2006).
- “The Just War Tradition Faces the Remnants of War,” The Impact of 9-11: The Day that Changed Everything? Matthew J. Morgan, ed. (New York: Palgrave Macmillan, 2009).
- "Integrating Social Contracts Theory: Hype and Hypernorms," Journal of Business Ethics. 26:2 (July, 2000), 101–110.
- “Reinhold Niebuhr’s Two Pragmatisms,” The American Journal of Theology and Philosophy 22.3 (September, 2001).
- “Changing the Rules: Just War Theory in the 21st Century,” Theology Today 54.1 (January, 2003)
- “Reformed Theology and Public Leadership”, with Lewis Mudge and Jim Watkins. Theological Education (Fall, 2004)
- “Democratic Structures and Democratic Cultures: A ‘Response’ to Paul Hanson and David Novak” Cross Currents 59.2 (June, 2009)
- “The Relevance of Experience and the Experience of Relevance” The Journal of Feminist Studies in Religion 28.1 (Spring, 2012)
- Roundtable Discussion: “Valerie Saiving and Reinhold Niebuhr: 50 Years Later,” The Journal of Feminist Studies in Religion 28.1 (Spring, 2012). Co-edited with Elizabeth Hinson-Hasty.
- "Agreeing to Disagree," The Journal for Preachers 22:4. (Pentecost, 2000), 33–38.
- “Rethinking the “just war” tradition,” Presbyterians Today (November, 2003).
- “Searching for Stars” and “Finding Time: A Response to Bill Harkins and Kathleen O’Connor,” @ this point: theological investigations in church and culture 1.1 (Spring, 2006).
- "Theological Exegesis Essays" for seventeen passages, Feasting on the Word: Lectionary Commentary Series, David Bartlett & Barbara Brown Taylor, eds. (Louisville: WJKP, 2008-).
- Entries for “Anxiety,” “Ends and Means,” “Force (Use of),” “Imperialism,” “Security,” “Tyranny,” “Violence,” “War,” “Media Ethics,” Dictionary of Scripture and Ethics, Joel B. Green, ed. (Ada, MI: Baker Academic).
