= Carol A. Newsom =

American biblical scholar and historian

Carol Ann Newsom (born July 4, 1950) is an American biblical scholar, historian of ancient Judaism, and literary critic. She is the Charles Howard Candler Professor Emerita of Old Testament at the Candler School of Theology and a former senior fellow at the Center for the Study of Law and Religion at Emory University. She is a leading expert on the Dead Sea Scrolls, Wisdom literature, and the Book of Daniel. She was awarded the Burkitt Medal for Biblical Studies by the British Academy for her 'distinguished contribution to the study of the Dead Sea Scrolls (particularly the Songs of the Sabbath Sacrifice), to ancient Hebrew Wisdom Literature, and to Apocalyptic'.

== Life ==
After obtaining her A.B. from Birmingham–Southern College (1971), Newsom moved to Harvard University, where she earned an M.T.S. from the Harvard Divinity School in 1975 and a Ph.D. from the Department of Near Eastern Languages & Civilizations in 1982. In 1980, while completing her doctoral studies, she began teaching at Emory University, in the Candler School of Theology. In 2005, she became Charles Howard Candler Professor of Old Testament. In doing so, Newsom made history as the second woman to hold a tenure-track position at Candler School of Theology and the first female faculty member appointed to a chaired professorship. Along with her teaching at Candler, Newsom was a senior fellow at Emory's Center for the Study of Law and Religion and from 2012 to 2014. In the administrative realm, Newsom served as Associate Dean of faculty development (2002–05) and as Director of the Graduate Division of Religion at Emory University from 2012 to 2015. Currently, Newsom is the Charles Howard Candler Professor Emerita of Old Testament at the Candler School of Theology.

In 2011, Newsom was elected President of the Society of Biblical Literature (SBL), the world's largest organization of biblical scholars. As part of SBL, Newsom has also held positions such as member of the Nominating Committee (1987-1989), Chair of the Nominating Committee (1988-1989), Secretary-Treasurer and Chair of National Program Committee (1992-1995), and vice-president (2010). In October 2016, she was inducted into the American Academy of Arts and Sciences (AAAS), one of the nation's oldest and most prestigious honorary societies and a leading center for independent policy research. Newsom's research fellowships have included grants from the American Council of Learned Societies, the National Endowment for the Humanities, and the Henry Luce Foundation. Newsom has also served on editorial boards for the Journal for the Study of the Pseudepigraph (since 1987), Old Testament Library Westminster/John Knox Press (since 1990), Abingdon Old Testament Commentary Series, Journal of Biblical Literature (1989-1991), Interpretation (1994-1996), New Oxford Annotated Bible (since 1997), Vetus Testament (since 2005, Associate Editor 2005–2010), Hebrew Bible and Ancient Israel (since 2009), and the Oxford Bibliographies Online (Biblical Studies) (since 2010).

== Publications ==
=== Books written ===
- Daniel: A Commentary. Westminster John Knox Press, 2014
- 1QHodayot with Incorporation of 1QHodayot^{b} and 4QHodayot^{a-f}. Hartmut Stegemann with Eileen Schuller; translation of texts by Carol Newsom. Oxford: Clarendon Press, 2009
- Newsom, Carol Ann (January 2004). The Self As Symbolic Space: Constructing Identity and Community at Qumran. BRILL. ISBN 9789004138032.
- The Book of Job: A Contest of Moral Imaginations. Oxford University Press, 2003
- Angelic Liturgy: Songs of the Sabbath Sacrifice. With J. Charlesworth. The Princeton Theological Seminary Dead Sea Scrolls Project. Tübingen: Mohr Siebeck and Louisville: Westminster John Knox Press, 1999
- Qumran Cave 4: VI; Poetical and Liturgical Texts, Part 1. With E. Eshel et al. Discoveries in the Judean Desert XI. Oxford: Clarendon Press, 1998
- Job. New Interpreters Bible. Nashville: Abingdon Press, 1996
- Songs of the Sabbath Sacrifice: A Critical Edition. Harvard Semitic Studies 27. Atlanta: Scholars Press, 1985; revised edition published in Newsom et al., Discoveries in the Judean Desert. Oxford: Clarendon Press, 1998.

=== Books edited ===
- Harper’s Bible Commentary. With J. Mays (gen. ed) et al. San Francisco: Harper & Row, 1988. Revised Edition, 2000.
- The Women’s Bible Commentary. With Sharon H. Ringe. Louisville: Westminster/John Knox, 1992. Third Edition, 2012.
- Women’s Bible Commentary: Expanded Edition with Apocrypha. With Sharon H. Ringe. Louisville: Westminster John Knox, 1998
- Oxford Annotated Bible. With M. Coogan (gen. ed.), et al. New York: Oxford University Press, 2001 (revised ed. 2010)

=== Articles, book chapters, and shorter critical text editions and translations ===
- "The Development of 1 Enoch 6-19: Cosmology and Judgment." Catholic Biblical Quarterly 42 (1980): 310–329.
- "A Maker of Metaphors: Ezekiel’s Oracles Against Tyre." Interpretation 38 (1984): 151–164. Reprinted in Interpreting the Prophets. Edited by J. Mays and P. Achtemeier. Philadelphia: Fortress, 1987. Reprinted in This Place Is Too Small for Us: The Israelite Prophets in Recent Scholarship. Edited by R. Gordon. Winona Lake, In.: Eisenbrauns, 1995.
- "The Past as Revelation: History in Apocalyptic Literature." Quarterly Review 4 (1984): 40–53.
- "The Masada Fragment of the Qumran Sabbath Shirot." (with Yigael Yadin) Israel Exploration Journal 34 (1984): 77–78.
- "Merkabah Exegesis in the Qumran Sabbath Shirot." Journal of Jewish Studies 38 (1987): 11–30.
- "Retelling the Story of the Exodus." Quarterly Review 7 (1987): 71–100.
- "The Psalms of Joshua from Qumran Cave 4: A Preliminary Edition." Journal of Jewish Studies 39 (1988): 56-73
- "4Q370: An Admonition Based on the Flood." Études Qumrâniennes: Mémorial Jean Carmiqnac. Edited by F. García Martínez and E. Puech. Revue de Qumrân 13 (1988): 23–43
- "Woman in the Discourse of Patriarchal Wisdom: A Study of Proverbs 1-9." Pp. 142–60 in Gender and Difference in Ancient Israel. Edited by P. Day. Philadelphia: Augsburg Fortress Press, 1989. Reprinted in T. K. Beal and D. Gunn, eds., Reading Bibles, Writing Bodies: Identity and The Book (New York and London: Routledge, 1997): 116–31.
- "'He Has Established for Himself Priests': Human and Angelic Priesthood in the Qumran Sabbath Shirot." Pp. 101–20 in Archaeology and History in the Dead Sea Scrolls. Edited by L. H. Schiffman. Sheffield: Sheffield Academic Press, 1990.
- "Apocalyptic and the Discourse of a Sectarian Community." Journal of Near Eastern Studies 49 (1990):135-44.
- "'Sectually Explicit' Literature from Qumran." Pp. 167–87 in The Bible and Its Interpreters. Edited by W. Propp and B. Halpern. Winona Lake, Ind.: Eisenbrauns, 1990.
- "The Sage in the Literature of Qumran: The Functions of the Maskil." Pp. 373–82 in The Sage in Ancient Israel. Edited by J. Gammie and L. Perdue. Winona Lake, Ind.: Eisenbrauns, 1990.
- "Kenneth Burke Meets the Teacher of Righteousness: Rhetorical Strategies in the Hodayot and the Serek ha-Yahad." Pp. 121–31 in Of Scribes and Scrolls: Studies on the Hebrew Bible, Intertestamental Judaism, and Christian Origins. Strugnell Festschrift. Edited by H. Attridge, J. Collins, T. Tobin, S.J. Lanham, Md.: University Press of America, 1990.
- "Job." Pp. 130–36 in The Women’s Bible Commentary. Edited by C. Newsom and S. Ringe. Louisville: Westminster, 1992.
- "The Case of the Blinking I: Discourse of the Self at Qumran." Pp. 13–23 in Discursive Formations, Ascetic Piety and the Interpretation of Early Christian Literature, Part 1. Edited by V. Wimbush. Semeia 57, 1992.
- "4Q374: A Discourse on the Exodus/Conquest Traditions." Pp. 40–52 in The Dead Sea Scrolls: Forty Years of Research. Edited by D. Dimant and U Rappaport. Leiden: E. J. Brill, 1992.
- "Knowing as Doing: The Social Symbolics of Knowledge at Qumran." Pp. 139–53 in Ideological Criticism of Biblical Texts. Edited by D. Jobling and T. Pippin. Semeia 59, 1993
- "Response to Norman Gottwald’s 'Social Class and Ideology in Isaiah 40-55: An Eagletonian Reading.'” Pp. 73–78 in Ideological Criticism of Biblical Texts. Edited. by D. Jobling and T. Pippin. Semeia 59, 1993.
- "Cultural Politics in the Reading of Job." Biblical Interpretation 2 (1993): 119–34.
- "Considering Job." Currents in Research: Biblical Studies 1 (1993): 97–131
- "The Moral Sense of Nature: Ethics in the Light of God’s Speech to Job." Princeton Seminary Bulletin 15 (1994): 9–27
- "Job and Ecclesiastes." Pp. 177–94 in Old Testament Interpretation: Past, Present, and Future (Essays in Honor of Gene M. Tucker). Edited by J. Mays, K. Richards, D. Petersen. Nashville: Abingdon Press, 1995. 3 70.
- "4Q Admonition on the Flood. Pp. 85-97 and Pl. XII in Qumran Cave 4: XIV. Parabiblical Texts, Part 2. Edited by J. VanderKam. Discoveries in the Judean Desert XIX. Oxford: Clarendon Press, 1995. 374.
- "4Q Discourse on the Exodus/Conquest Tradition." Pp. 99–110 in Qumran Cave 4: XIV, Parabiblical Texts, Part 2. Edited by J. VanderKam. Discoveries in the Judean Desert XIX. Oxford: Clarendon Press, 1995.
- "4Q378 and 4Q379: An Apocryphon of Joshua." Pp. 35–85 in Qumranstudien. Edited by H.-J. Fabry, A. Lange, and H. Lichtenberger. Göttingen: Vandenhoeck & Ruprecht, 1996.
- "Bakhtin, the Bible, and Dialogic Truth." Journal of Religion 76 (1996): 290–306. 378–379.
- "4Q Apocryphon of Joshua." pp. 241–88 and Pls. xvii-xx in Qumran Cave 4: XVII, Parabiblical Texts, Part 3. Edited by J. VanderKam. Discoveries in the Judean Desert XXII Oxford: Clarendon Press, 1996.
- "Songs of the Sabbath Sacrifice." Pp. 28–32 in M. Kiley et al., eds., Prayer from Alexander to Constantine: A Critical Anthology. London and New York: Routledge, 1997.
- "Daniel and Psalm 151." pp. 201–206 and 335–336 in C. Newsom and S. Ringe, eds. Women’s Bible Commentary: Expanded Edition with Apocrypha. Louisville: Westminster John Knox, 1998.
- "Job and His Friends: A Conflict of Moral Imaginations." Interpretation 53 (1999): 239–253
- "Common Ground: An Ecological Reading of Genesis 2-3." Pp. 60–72 in The Earth Story in Genesis. The Earth Bible, vol. 2. Edited by N. Habel and S. Wurst. Sheffield: Sheffield Academic Press, 2000.
- "Probing Scripture." Christian Century (118, no. 1): 21–28.
- "Apocalyptic Subjects: The Social Construction of the Self at Qumran." Journal for the Study of the Pseudepigrapha 12 (2001): 3–25.
- "The Book of Job as Polyphonic Text." Journal for the Study of the Old Testament 97 (2002): 87–108
- "The Consolations of God: Assessing Job’s Friends Across a Cultural Abyss." In C. Exum and H. Williamson, eds., Reading from Right to Left. Sheffield: Sheffield Academic Press, 2003.
- "Elihu’s Sapiential Hymn (Job 36:24-37:13): Genre, Rhetoric and Moral Imagination." Pp. 347–58 in C. Mandolfo and T. Sandoval, Relating to the Text: Interdisciplinary and Form-Critical Insights on the Bible. London: T&T Clark International, 2003
- "Spying out the Land: A Report from Genealogy." Pp. 437–50 in R. Troxel, K. Friebel, and D. Magary, eds. Seeking out the Wisdom of the Ancients: Essays Offered to Michael V. Fox on the Occasion of His Sixty-Fifth Birthday. Winona lake, IN: Eisenbrauns, 2005. [Reprinted: Pp. 19–30 in R. Boer, ed., Bakhtin and Genre Theory in Biblical Studies. Semeia Studies 63; Atlanta: Society of Biblical Literature, 2008.]
- "Genesis 2-3 and 1 Enoch 6-16: Two Myths of Origin and Their Ethical Implications." Pp. 7–23 in C. R. Yoder, et al., eds., Shaking Heaven and Earth. Louisville: Westminster John Knox, 2005.
- "Rhyme and Reason: The Historical Résumé in Israelite and Early Jewish Thought." Pp. 215–233 in A. Lemaire, ed., Congress Volume Leiden 2004. Supp. to Vetus Testamentum 109; Leiden and Boston: Brill, 2006.
- "Re-Considering Job." Currents in Biblical Research 5 (2007): 155–82. Response to "How Are the Mighty Fallen? A Dialogical Study of King Saul in 1 Samuel," Horizons in Biblical Theology 29 (2007): 29–39.
- "Dramaturgy and the Book of Job." Pp. 375–93 in T. Krüger et al., eds., Das Buch Hiob und seine Interpretationen. Zürich: Theologischer Verlag Zürich, 2007
- "Constructing 'We, You, and the Others' Through Non-Polemical Discourse." Pp. 13–21 in Florentino García Martínez and Mladen Popovic, eds., Defining Identity: We, You, and the Others in the Dead Sea Scrolls. STDJ 70; Brill: Leiden, 2008
- "Daniel." Pp. 257–60 in Gail R. O’Day and David L. Petersen, eds. Theological Bible Commentary. Nashville: Abington Press, 2009.
- "Reflections on Ideological Criticism and Postcritical Perspectives." Pp. 541–60 in J. M. LeMon and K. H. Richards, eds., Method Matters: Essays on the Interpretation of the Hebrew Bible in Honor of David L. Petersen. Atlanta: Society of Biblical Literature, 2009.
- "Rhetorical Criticism and the Dead Sea Scrolls." Forthcoming in M. Grossman, ed., Methods in the Study of the Dead Sea Scrolls. Grand Rapids: Eerdmans.
- "Rhetorical Criticism and the Reading of the Qumran Scrolls." Forthcoming in J. Collins and T. Lim, eds., Oxford Handbook of the Dead Sea Scrolls. New York: Oxford University Press.
- “God’s Other: The Intractable Problem of the Gentile King in Judean and Early Jewish Literature.” Forthcoming in John Collins Festschrift. Edited by Joel Kaminsky. Grand Rapids, MI: Eerdmans.
- “Why Nabonidus: Excavating Traditions from Qumran, the Hebrew Bible, and Neo-Babylonian Sources.” Forthcoming in Hindy Najman, ed.
- “Pairing Research Questions and Theories of Genre: A Case Study of the Hodayot,” Dead Sea Discoveries
- “Positive Psychology and the Israelite Wisdom Tradition: Eudaimonic and Hedonic Aspects of Happiness.” Forthcoming in Brent Strawn, ed. The Bible and Happiness. New York: Oxford University Press.
- “Religious Experience in the Dead Sea Scrolls: Two Case Studies.” Forthcoming in R. Werline and C. Shantz, eds. SBL Symposium Series. Atlanta: SBL.
- "Models of the Moral Self: Hebrew Bible and Second Temple Judaism." Journal of Biblical Literature. Vol. 131 (1) 2012. 5-25.
- "Rhetoric and Hermeneutics: Approaches to Text, Tradition and Social Construction in Biblical and Second Temple Literature: Selected Essays." Tübingen: Mohr Siebeck, 2019
- "The Self as Symbolic Space: Constructing Identity and Community at Qumran." Boston/Leiden: Brill; 2004; pb. 2007.
- “Woman in the Discourse of Patriarchal Wisdom: A Study of Proverbs 1-9.” pp. 142–60 in Gender and Difference in Ancient Israel. Edited by P. Day. Philadelphia: Augsburg Fortress Press, 1989.

=== Selected Encyclopedia and Reference Articles ===
- Harper’s Bible Dictionary. Edited by P. Achtemeier. New York: Harper & Row, 1985. “Habakkuk,” p. 364; “Scroll,” p. 915
- Dictionary of Pastoral Care. Edited by R. Hunter. Nashville: Abingdon, 1990. “Wisdom Tradition, Biblical,” p. 1326
- Anchor Bible Dictionary. Edited by N. Freedman. New York: Doubleday, 1992. “Angels,” vol. I, pp. 248–53; “Gabriel (Angel),” vol. II, p. 863; “Joshua, Psalms of” vol. III, p. 1015; “Raguel (Angel),” vol. V, p. 610; “Songs of the Sabbath Sacrifice,” vol. VI, pp. 155–56; “Uriel (Angel),” Vol. VI, p. 769.
- The Oxford Study Bible. Edited by M. Jack Suggs, Katharine Doob Sakenfeld, James R. Mueller. New York: Oxford University Press, 1992. “The Dead Sea Scrolls and Other Jewish Literature” (pp. 101–111).
- The HarperCollins Study Bible. Edited by W. Meeks, et al. San Francisco: HarperCollins, 1993. “Baruch, Introduction and Annotations” (pp. 1617–26).
- Dictionary of Biblical Interpretation. Edited by John H. Hayes. Nashville: Abingdon, 1999. With S. E. Schreiner, “Job, Book of” (pp. 587–599).
- Encyclopedia of the Dead Sea Scrolls. Edited by J. VanderKam et al. New York: Oxford University Press. “Job, Book of,” “Mysticism,” “Songs of the Sabbath Sacrifice,” “Throne,” (pp. 412–13, 591–94, 887–89, 946–47).
- Dictionary of New Testament Background. Edited by C. A. Evans and S. E. Porter. Downers Grove, Ind.: Intervarsity Press, 2002. “4Q374-377 Apocryphon of Moses”; “4Q378-379 Apocryphon of Joshua”; “4Q400-407 Songs of the Sabbath Sacrifice.”
- Oxford Biblical Studies Online. “The Book of Daniel.”
- Oxford Bibliographies Online. “The Book of Daniel,” “The Book of Job,” “Dead Sea Scrolls.”

== Awards and honors ==
- 1998 "On Eagle's Wings" Teaching Award, Candler School of Theology
- 2006 Honorary doctorate D.D. Birmingham Southern College
- 2009 Honorary doctorate Th.D. from the University of Copenhagen
- 2009 Emory Williams Distinguished Teaching Award, Emory University
- 2016 Fellowship, American Academy of Arts and Sciences
- 2013 Honorary member, Great Britain's Society for Old Testament Study
- 2013 Honorary doctorate from Virginia Theological Seminary
- 2025 The Burkitt Prize, British Academy

Newsom has also delivered a number of special lectures: the Kittel Lecture of Yale Divinity School, the Alexander Thompson Lecture of Princeton Theological Seminary, the Thomas Burns Lectureship at the University of Otago, Dunedin, New Zealand, the Craigie Lecturer of the Canadian Society of Biblical Studies, the Chisolm Lecture of Yale Divinity School, the Currie Lectures of Austin Presbyterian Seminary, the John Priest Lecture of Florida State University, the Chi Rho Lecture of Central Lutheran Church in Eugene, Oregon, the Horgan Lecturer of Furman University, the Zenos Lecture of McCormick Theological Seminary, and the Harry Lyman Hooker Visiting Professor Public Lecture of McMaster University.
