= David Bartlett (criminologist) =

Australian criminologist and TV personality

David Bartlett (c. 1972) is an Australian criminologist, risk expert, academic and TV personality. He is best known as an expert panellist on popular ABC iview series Crime Night!, where he appears alongside host Julia Zemiro and fellow criminologist Professor Danielle Reynald..

== Early life and education ==
Dr David Bartlett grew up in Beaudesert, Queensland where he attended Beaudesert State High School. He subsequently studied psychology and criminology at Griffith University and business at the University of New England, before completing a PhD in criminology at Griffith University.

== Career ==
Bartlett commenced his career straight from school, working in his local courthouse and went on to work across a number of Queensland government departments mainly in criminal justice and health. He subsequently left the public service to pursue an academic career.

As an academic at Griffith University, he taught courses focused on white collar crime, psychology of crime, environmental criminology and crime statistics and was the recipient of teaching awards. His research includes a national study of Corporate Crime in Australia, regulatory offending and alcohol related violence. He has also published on topics including crime statistics, on how to better protect children from being victimised in childcare, and crime harm.

Bartlett served as the Director of Postgraduate and Continuing Education at Griffith University’s School of Criminology and Criminal Justice before leaving academia to commence his consulting practice, BDK Insights.

== Media Career ==
Bartlett commenced his media career in 2025 as an expert panellist on the ABC iview series Crime Night!, a six part series exploring the science and psychology of crime.

Hosted by well known Australian TV personality Julia Zemiro and produced by Frank Bruzzese and David Forster, Crime Night! debuted as the most watched TV show in its time slot.

== Board Roles ==
Bartlett has served on the boards of several organisations including Court Network, Sakura Education Foundation, Hepatitis Queensland and the Queensland Police Service’s Gold Coast Community Policing Board.

== Personal life ==
Bartlett is married with two children and lives in the Gold Coast hinterland

On episode 6 of Crime Night! he disclosed to comedian Susie Youssef that he has coeliac disease.
