= Barbara Brown Taylor =

American Episcopal priest, academic and author

The Reverend Barbara Brown Taylor
- Born: Barbara Brown; September 21, 1951 (age 75); Lafayette, Indiana, US
- Spouse: Edward Taylor (m. 1982)

Ecclesiastical career
- Religion: Christianity (Mainline Anglican)
- Church: Episcopal Church (United States)
- Ordained: 1984 (priest)

Academic background
- Education: Emory University; Yale University

Academic work
- Discipline: Religious studies
- School or tradition: Panentheism
- Institutions: Piedmont College
- Website: barbarabrowntaylor.com

Barbara Brown Taylor (born 1951) is an American Mainline Protestant minister, Episcopal priest, academic, and author. In 2014, Time magazine placed her in its annual Time 100 list of most influential people in the world.

== Education and recognition ==
Taylor was born on September 21, 1951, in Lafayette, Indiana. She did her undergraduate studies at Emory University where she graduated in 1973. She then went on to study at Yale Divinity School, where she graduated in 1976. She was ordained in 1984, and became the rector of Grace-Calvary Episcopal Church (Episcopal Diocese of Atlanta) in Clarkesville, Georgia, in 1992. She later left parish ministry and became a full-time professor at Piedmont College in Demorest, Georgia, and an adjunct professor of Christian spirituality at Columbia Theological Seminary in Decatur, Georgia. She taught world religions and exposed her mainly Christian students to other faiths so they could better understand how various groups worship.

In 1996, she was named one of the twelve "most effective" preachers in the English-speaking world by Baylor University. She was awarded the 1998 Emory Medal by the Emory Alumni Association of Emory University for her distinguished achievement in education. In February 2009, Barbara Brown Taylor led the second annual Piedmont College religion conference in Athens, Georgia. Taylor had been the keynote speaker at the conference in previous years. In addition, Taylor gave the 2009 Annual Buechner Lecture at the Buechner Institute at King University. She has written twelve books on faith and spirituality. In February 2010, days before Piedmont College's religion conference, Taylor ranked in the top ten most influential living preachers in a poll conducted by the Southern Baptist Convention.

== Career ==
In the early 2000s, she chose to leave active ministry, while retaining her ordination. Her memoir of this time Leaving Church: A Memoir of Faith was the first of a trilogy of books about redefining her faith followed by An Altar in the World: A Geography of Faith and Learning to Walk in the Dark.

== Private life ==
She lives on her farm in northern Georgia, with husband Edward Taylor.

== Bibliography ==
- "He was alive and he was real". Christian Century. 110 (28): 967. 1993.
- The Preaching Life. Cowley Publications. 1993. pp. 174. ISBN 978-1-56101-074-5.
- Gospel Medicine. Cowley Publications. 1995. p. 161. ISBN 978-1-56101-110-0.
- Bread of Angels. Cowley Publications. 1997. pp. 176. ISBN 978-1-56101-142-1.
- God in Pain. Abingdon Press. 1998. p. 138. ISBN 978-0-687-05887-7.
- Mixed Blessings. Cowley Publications. 1998. p. 129. ISBN 978-1-56101-162-9.
- When God is Silent. Cowley Publications. 1998. p. 129. ISBN 978-1-56101-157-5.
- Home By Another Way. Cowley Publications. 1999. pp. 212. ISBN 978-1-56101-167-4.
- Speaking of Sin: The Lost Language of Salvation. Cowley Publications. 2001. p. 104. ISBN 978-1-56101-189-6.
- The Luminous Web: Essays on Science and Religion. Cowley Publications. 2001. pp. 109. ISBN 978-1-56101-169-8.
- The Seeds of Heaven: Sermons on the Gospel of Matthew. Westminster. 2004. p. 113. ISBN 978-0-664-22886-6.
- Leaving Church: A Memoir of Faith. HarperOne. 2007. p. 272. ISBN 978-0-06-087263-2.
- "The poured-out church". Christian Century. 11: 35. 2007.
- An Altar in the World: A Geography of Faith. HarperOne. 2009. p. 240. ISBN 978-0-06-137046-5.
- Learning to Walk in the Dark. HarperOne. 2014. p. 200. ISBN 978-0-06-202435-0.
- Holy Envy: Finding God in the Faith of Others. HarperOne. 2019. p. 256. ISBN 978-0-06-240656-9.
- Co-editor with David L. Bartlett, Feasting on the Word Commentary Series. Westminster John Knox Press. 2008.
