= David L. Bartlett =

David Lyon Bartlett
- Born: February 16, 1941
- Died: October 12, 2017 (aged 76)
- Title: J. Edward and Ruth Cox Lantz Professor Emeritus of Christian Communication

Academic background
- Education: Yale Divinity School
- Thesis: (1972)

David Lyon Bartlett (February 16, 1941 – October 12, 2017) was the J. Edward and Ruth Cox Lantz Professor Emeritus of Christian Communication at Yale Divinity School, Distinguished Professor Emeritus of New Testament at Columbia Theological Seminary, and an ordained minister of the American Baptist Churches, USA.

== Education ==
Bartlett completed his undergraduate education at Swarthmore College in 1962, where he earned a Bachelor of Arts. He then proceeded to attend Yale Divinity School where he earned a Bachelor of Divinity in 1967 and his Doctor of Philosophy from the Department of Religious Studies in New Testament in 1972.

== Professional career ==
Bartlett had a long career, holding both academic and pastoral positions. As an ordained minister of the American Baptist Churches, USA he served as the Senior Minister for congregations in Minnesota, Illinois, and California. He was also on the faculty at schools such as American Baptist Seminary of the West and Graduate Theological Union, The Divinity School of The University of Chicago, Union Theological Seminary in Richmond, Virginia, Yale Divinity School, and Columbia Theological Seminary. He was Associate Dean of Academic Affairs at Yale Divinity School for eleven years. At both Yale Divinity School and Columbia Theological Seminary he was a distinguished faculty member and was honored as professor emeritus. He also served as theologian in residence at Trinity Presbyterian Church in Atlanta.

He served for several years on the editorial board of works such as Interpretation and Preaching Great Texts. He has also been on the Board of Consultants for the Journal of Religion and the National Advisory Board for the Christian Networks Journal.

He worked on the Feasting on the Word commentary series. He and Barbara Brown Taylor were co-editors for this twelve volume series that aimed at giving pastors and educators a variety of views on scripture that could be easily used.

== Writings ==
Bartlett wrote a number of books and scholarly articles. He also contributed to a number of other works as editor.

=== Books ===
- Bartlett, David L. (1975). Fact and Faith. Valley Forge, PA: Judson Press. ISBN 9780817006549. OCLC 1175892.
- ——— (1977). Paul's Vision for the Teaching Church. Valley Forge, PA: Judson Press. ISBN 9780817007386. OCLC 2798287.
- ———; Bartlett, Carol (1980). Adam's New Friend, and other stories from the Bible. Valley Forge, PA: Judson Press. ISBN 9780817008826. OCLC 5946507.
- ———; Orr, Richard (1980). Bible Journeys, experiences for Christian growth: A Youth Resource. Valley Forge, PA: Judson Press. ISBN 9780817008987. OCLC 6277771.
- ——— (1983). The Shape of Scriptural Authority. Philadelphia, PA: Fortress Press. ISBN 9780800617134. OCLC 9557621.
- ———; Fowler, Ruth (1987). Moments of Commitment: years of growth: evangelism and Christian education. St. Louis, MO: CBP Press. ISBN 9780827204515. OCLC 16083670.
- ——— (1993). Ministry in the New Testament. Overtures to Biblical Theology. Minneapolis, MO: Fortress-Augsburg. ISBN 9780800615659. OCLC 28113947.
- ——— (1995). Romans. Westminster Bible Companion. Louisville, KY: Westminster John Knox Press. ISBN 9780585338286. OCLC 45885585.
- ——— (1999). Between the Bible and the Church: new methods for biblical preaching. Nashville, TN: Abingdon Press. ISBN 9780687028252. OCLC 39786257.
- ——— (2003). What's Good About This News? Preaching from the Gospels and Galatians. Lyman Beecher lectures, 2003. Louisville, KY: Westminster John Knox Press. ISBN 9780664225261. OCLC 52047335.
- ——— (2003). Doescher, Ian (ed.). To All God's Beloved in New Haven: David Bartlett's Yale Sermons. ExLibris. ISBN 9781413433678. OCLC 56385305.

=== Edited by ===
- ———; Highbaugh, Claudia A.; Murray, Stephen B., eds. (2003). Crossing by Faith: Essays and Sermons in Honor of Harry Baker Adams. St. Louis, MO: Chalice Press. ISBN 9780827204928. OCLC 52706411.
- ———; Taylor, Barbara Brown, eds. (2008–2011). Feasting on the Word: preaching the revised common lectionary. Louisville, TN: Westminster John Knox Press. (twelve volumes in following years).
- ———; Miller, Patrick D. Jr. (eds.). Westminster Bible Companion. a series of commentaries. Louisville, MO: Westminster John Knox Press.

=== Chapters ===
- ——— (1997). "I Peter". New Interpreter's Bible. Vol. 12. Nashville, TN: Abingdon Press. ISBN 9780687278251. OCLC 444896561.
- ——— (1999). "Advent/Christmas". New Proclamation: Year B, 1999-2000. Minneapolis, MO: Fortress Press. ISBN 9780664231002. OCLC 827795936.
- ——— (2006). "Matthew". In Gregory, Andrew F. (ed.). The Fourfold Gospel. London: SPCK. ISBN 9780281056910. OCLC 75964401.
