= Kathleen M. O'Connor =

American Old Testament scholar

- Title: Professor Emerita of Old Testament

Academic background
- Education: College of New Rochelle (1964); Providence College (M.A., 1973); Princeton Theological Seminary (Ph.D., 1984)

Academic work
- Discipline: Biblical studies
- Institutions: Columbia Theological Seminary

Kathleen M. O'Connor is an American Old Testament scholar and the William Marcellus McPheeters Professor Emerita of Old Testament at Columbia Theological Seminary. She is widely known for her work in relating trauma and disaster, as well as present-day intercultural and ecumenical issues for biblical studies.

== Education ==
O'Connor received a B.A. from the College of New Rochelle (1964), Educational Certification from Mount Saint Mary College (1966), an M.A. from Providence College in Biblical Studies (1973), and a Ph.D. from Princeton Theological Seminary in Old Testament (1984). She has participated in an interdisciplinary study tour of Israel through Seton Hall University (1974).

== Career and research ==
She was a lecturer of biblical studies and assistant chaplain at Providence College (1974-1977) before she spent several years as a teaching fellow at Princeton Theological Seminary (1978-1981). After receiving her Ph.D. she became a professor of biblical studies at Maryknoll School of Theology (1982-1994). She then served as professor of Old Testament language, literature, and exegesis at Columbia Theological Seminary (1995-2004). Beginning in 2005, she took the position of the William Marcellus McPheeters Professor of Old Testament at Columbia Theological Seminary (2005-2010), where she retired and was named emerita in 2011. The seminary has named an annual lectureship in her honor.

O'Connor has served in a number of professional societies throughout her career. She has served as both president (2008–2009) and vice president (2007–2008) of the Catholic Biblical Association. She served as a member of Council for the Society of Biblical Literature, through which she was co-chair of the Composition of the Book of Jeremiah Group (1991-1998). She has also sat on a number of other committees such as Theology in Global Context Association, North American Coordinating Committee (1986–94) and was the academic coordinator and instructor of "Reading the Bible In Context and Across Cultures", Maryknoll Summer Institute (1993).

She is currently serving as a doctoral mentor for The Louisville Institute and working on a commentary on the book of Genesis. In May 2016 she is to receive a Distinguished Alumni/ae Award from Princeton Theological Seminary.

O'Connor has published a number of books and articles concerning rigorous study of the Old Testament and how it relates to the world today. In addition to this she has also written and contributed to several biblical commentaries.

She has devoted much of her work to trauma and disaster research within the Bible. She is widely known for her publications Jeremiah: Pain and Promise (2012) and Lamentations and the Tears of the World (2002) concerning this field of study. Jeremiah: Pain and Promise is the culmination of six years of work supported by the Henry Luce III Fellowship. She explores the book of Jeremiah as a history and biography of an ancient community seeking to restore a collapsed society. She seeks to convey her theology that "portrays God as equally afflicted by disaster; and invites a reconstruction of reality and of God's relationship with them". Lamentations and the Tears of the World also explores pain and trauma after the fall of Jerusalem as outlined by the book of Lamentations. For this book she received the first prize in Scripture from the Catholic Press Association (2003).

Her other focus is on the role of the church in today's world. She discusses this in Breaking Bread, Building Justice: The Mission of the Church in the World of Hungers (2011). She composed this book with eight scholars and pastors from around the world who focused on the issues of hunger and the "expanding pastoral awareness of the context in which churches minister, and broaden biblical and ethical resources for reflect on the nature of missiology."

== Awards and honors ==
- In 2015 Columbia Theological Seminary established the Kathleen O'Connor Lectures to honor the contributions she has made "to biblical scholarship for the sake of the world."
- Henry Luce III Fellowship 2004-2005 for The Moral Formation of Community after Disaster in the Book of Jeremiah.
- First Prize for in Scripture for Lamentations and the Tears of the World, Orbis Books, awarded by the Catholic Press Association, 2003.
- Princeton Theological Teaching Fellowship
- Emerita as William Marcellus McPheeters Professor of Old Testament at Columbia Theological Seminary.
- Guest Lecturer and Preaching Workshop Leader at the Craddock Center Preaching.

== Publications ==
- Jeremiah: Pain and Promise. Minneapolis: Fortress Press, 2012.
- Lamentations and the Tears of the World. Maryknoll: Orbis Press, 2002.
- Shaking Heaven and Earth: Essays in Honor of Walter Brueggemann and Charles B. Cousar, co-edited with Christine Yoder, E. Elizabeth Johnson, and Stanley P. Saunders (Louisville, KY:Westminster John Knox, 2005).
- Troubling Jeremiah, coeditor with L. Stulman and A. R. Diamond. Sheffield: Sheffield Academic Press, 1999.
- The Wisdom Literature. Message of Biblical Spirituality 5. Michael Glazier; Collegeville: Liturgical Press, 1988.
- The Confessions of Jeremiah: Their Interpretation and Role in Chapters 1-25. Society of Biblical Literature, Dissertation Series 94. Atlanta: Scholars Press, 1988.
- The Book of Job, Collegeville Bible Study Guide. Collegeville: Liturgical Press, 2012.
- "Genesis" New Interpreters Dictionary of the Bible, edited by Katherine Doob Sakenfield, (Nashville: Abingdon).
- "Feminism Meets the Old Testament: One Woman’s Perspective," Feminist Introduction to the Old Testament: Essays in Honor of Katherine Doob Sakenfield, edited by Linda Day and Carolyn Pressler. Louisville: Westminster John Knox, 2007.
- "Lamentations," The New Interpreters' Bible, vol. VI, edited by Leander Keck, Nashville: Abingdon, 2001.
- "Jeremiah," Oxford Bible Commentary, edited by John Barton and Robert Muddiman, Oxford: Oxford University Press, 2001.
- “Jeremiah,” Oxford Access Study Bible, New York: Oxford University Press, 1999.
- “Jeremiah,” The New Interpreter’s Study Bible, Abingdon Press, 2003.
- "Breaking Bread, Building Justice: The Mission of the Church in a World of Hungers", VDM Verlag Dr. Müller, July 10, 2011. This publication was a product of the Campbell Scholars Program at Columbia Theological Seminary.
- "Feasting on the Word", editor and Contributor, Westminster John Knox Press, 12 volumes, 2008-11.
- "Journal of Biblical Literature", editorial board, 2001-07.
- "Horizons in Biblical Theology", associate editor, 1999-2003.
- "The Catholic Biblical Quarterly", associate editor, 1991-98.
- "Old Testament Abstracts," Associate Editor.
- "Genesis: Commentary", Smith and Helwys Books, (To be published).
