= Christine Roy Yoder =

Christine Roy Yoder is J. McDowell Richards Professor of Biblical Interpretation at Columbia Theological Seminary, and an ordained minister of word and sacrament in the Presbyterian Church (USA). She is currently serving as interim dean of faculty and vice president for academic affairs.

== Education ==
Yoder received a B.A. from Swarthmore College (1990), a M.Div. from Princeton Theological Seminary (1994), and a Ph.D. in Old Testament from Princeton Theological Seminary (2000).

== Career and research ==
She was the instructor of Old Testament language, literature, and exegesis at Columbia Theological Seminary (1998–2000), before then becoming an assistant professor of Old Testament language, literature, and exegesis (2000–2004), and then was promoted to professor. In July 2019, she was appointed as J. McDowell Richards Chair of Biblical Interpretation.

Yoder has performed research and exegetical study on the Old Testament, with a focus on wisdom literature and proverbs. She has published several books, while also contributing chapters and articles to a number of other publications.

Her current research is focused on the configuration of desire in Israelite wisdom literature. She proposes "Desire is thus “hardwired” in the body, perceptive, and teachable" and "challenges dualistic (cognitive/emotional) notions of desire for wisdom currently assumed in biblical studies." Her work "has implications for contemporary interdisciplinary and theological reconsiderations of desire by presenting a biblical portrait that neither represses nor limits desire to sexuality or personal want."

== Honors ==
- Luce Scholar named by Association of Theological Schools and The Henry Luce Foundation, Inc. (2014–2015)
- Group Project Grant, “Teaching Biblical Exegesis in Theological Schools.” (2006–2007)
- Catholic Biblical Association Fellowship (2006–2007)
- Lilly Theological Research Grant (2002–2003)

== Publications ==
- Proverbs. Abingdon Old Testament Commentaries. Edited by Patrick D. Miller Jr., et al. Nashville, TN: Abingdon, 2009.
- Wisdom as a Woman of Substance: A Socioeconomic Reading of Proverbs 1-9 and 31:10-31. BZAW 304. Berlin/New York: Walter de Gruyter, 2001.
- Shaking Heaven and Earth: Essays in Honor of Walter Brueggemann and Charles Cousar. Editor with Kathleen M. O’Connor, E. Elizabeth Johnson, and Stanley P. Saunders. Louisville, KY: Westminster John Knox, 2005.
- Proverbs. In the Women's Bible Commentary: Twentieth Anniversary Edition. (Louisville, KY: Westminster John Knox).
- Editor for all entries related to wisdom literature and the Psalms in the Encyclopedia of the Bible and Its Reception, a 30-volume and on-line resource, Walter de Gruyter (2006–present) Vols. 1-2 (2009); Vol. 3 (2011); Vol. 4 (2011).
