= Historical theology =

History of Christian doctrine

Historical theology is the study of the history of Christian doctrine. Alister McGrath defines historical theology as 'the branch of theological inquiry which aims to explore the historical development of Christian doctrines, and identify the factors which were influential in the formulation and adoption.' Grenz, Guretzki and Nordling describe it as, "The division of the theological discipline that seeks to understand and delineate how the church interpreted Scripture and developed doctrine throughout its history, from the time of the apostles to the present day. The twofold function of historical theology is to show the origin and development of beliefs held in the present day and to help contemporary theologians identify theological errors of the past that should be avoided in the present."

== Overview ==
According to Friedrich Schleiermacher, historical theology is a historical discipline, one that approaches areas of theology using methods that are employed in the study of any other historical phenomena. This is based on the notion that theology has a historical rather than a speculative starting point. For instance, the Bible and the writings of ecumenical councils are considered as historical sources and their contents are treated as witness accounts. It covers the bulk of what Schleiermacher termed as the true body of theology and could include exegetical theology, dogmatics, and church history.

As a branch of theology it investigates the socio-historical and cultural mechanisms that give rise to theological ideas, statements, and systems. The field focuses on the relationship between theology and its contexts, as well as on the major theological or philosophical influences upon the figures and topics studied. Its methodological foundation and aims are similar to those used by intellectual historians researching historical epistemology, particularly those such as Matthew Daniel Eddy, who investigate the cultural connections between theology and other disciplines that existed in the past.

An evangelical position maintains that historical theology must be aligned with the word of God or that it must always reference the Scripture.

== See also ==
- History of Christianity
- The Orthodox-faith Historiography
