= Columbia Theological Seminary =

Presbyterian seminary in Georgia, U.S.

- Former names: Theological Seminary of the Synod of South Carolina and Georgia (1828–1925)
- Type: Private seminary
- Established: 1828; 198 years ago
- Accreditation: SACS
- Religious affiliation: Presbyterian Church (U.S.A.)
- Academic affiliations: ATS
- Endowment: $295.7 million (2025)
- President: Victor Aloyo Jr.
- Academic staff: 20
- Students: 305
- Location: 701 South Columbia Drive, Decatur, Georgia, United States; 33.76466°N 84.28080°W
- Campus: Suburban, 57 acres (23 ha)
- Website: ctsnet.edu

Columbia Theological Seminary is a Presbyterian seminary in Decatur, Georgia. It is one of ten theological institutions affiliated with the Presbyterian Church (USA).

== History ==
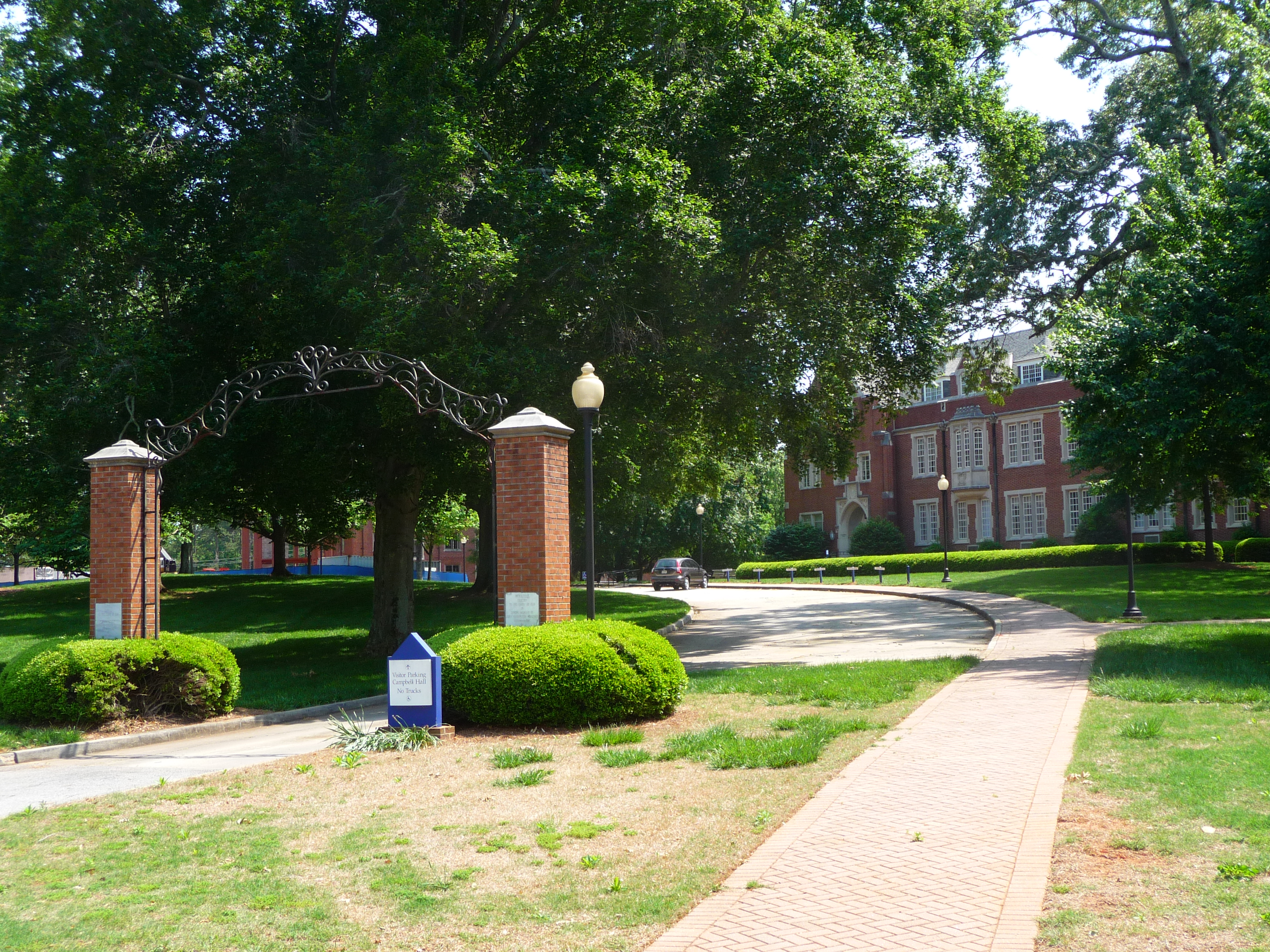
Columbia Theological Seminary in 2011.

Columbia Theological Seminary was founded in 1828 in Lexington, Georgia, by several Presbyterian ministers. In 1830, the seminary was moved to Columbia, South Carolina (taking its name at that location), and in 1927, to its current location in suburban Atlanta. During the American Civil War, the seminary became affiliated with the Presbyterian Church of the Confederate States of America, renamed the Presbyterian Church in the United States after the war. The school became a battle ground in the debate over the theory of evolution in the PCUS during the 1880s, due to the controversial views of James Woodrow, an uncle of U.S. president Woodrow Wilson and seminary science professor, who aligned with evolution, a controversy which led to the school not operating during the 1887–1888 academic year.

In 1830, Columbia, South Carolina, became the first permanent location of the seminary. The school became popularly known as Columbia Theological Seminary, and the name was formally accepted in 1925. The decade of the 1920s saw a shift in population throughout the Southeast. Atlanta was becoming a commercial and industrial center and growing rapidly in its cultural and educational opportunities. Between 1925 and 1930, President Richard T. Gillespie provided leadership that led to the development of the present facilities on a fifty-seven-acre tract in Decatur, Georgia. Because the early years in Decatur were difficult, the future of the institution became uncertain. Columbia, however, experienced substantial growth under the leadership of J. McDowell Richards, who was elected president in 1932 and led the seminary for almost four decades.

Columbia was one of the several PCUS seminaries that joined the PC (U.S.A.) following the 1983 PCUS and United Presbyterian Church in the U.S.A. merger. It upholds its historic covenants with the Synods of Living Waters and South Atlantic.

=== Presidents ===
- 1911–1921 Thornton Whaling
- 1921–1924 John M. Wells
- 1925–1930 Richard T. Gillespie
- 1932–1971 J. McDowell Richards
- 1971–1976 C. Benton Kline
- 1976–1987 J. Davison Philips
- 1987–2000 Douglas Oldenburg
- 2000–2009 Laura S. Mendenhall
- 2009–2014 Stephen A. Hayner
- 2015–2022 Leanne Van Dyk
- 2022–present Victor Aloyo

== Notable people ==
=== Frederick Buechner ===
Columbia's affiliation with the acclaimed American theologian and writer, Frederick Buechner, is centered on the Presbyterian values shared between school and author. In the interest of promoting these shared values, the seminary has regularly distributed copies of Buechner's works among its students. Columbia Theological Seminary also awards student prizes for excellence in preaching and excellence in writing named in honor of the author. Winners of the prize are selected by faculty in recognition of their significant achievements in these areas. Additionally, Buechner enjoyed a long-lasting friendship with Walter Brueggemann, Old Testament Professor Emeritus at the Seminary. Both men were contemporaries at Union Theological Seminary.

=== Thomas Goulding ===
Thomas Goulding was one of the founding Presbyterian ministers and the first president of the early Presbyterian Theological Seminary. He was ordained in 1816 and served as a minister in Midway, Georgia, for 6 years before resigning his charge. He helped to build the community that later would become the seminary and was elected by the synod of Georgia and South Carolina to be its first, and at the time, only professor. Goulding, by appointment of the General Assembly, opened the first session of the Synod of Georgia, which met in Macon in 1845, and was elected its first moderator.
