= Princeton Theological Seminary =

Private school of theology in New Jersey, US

Coordinates: 40°20′40″N 74°39′52″W

- Type: Seminary
- Established: 1812 (214 years ago)
- Accreditation: MSCHE; ATS
- Affiliations: Presbyterian Church (USA)
- Endowment: $1.56 billion (2025)
- President: Jonathan L. Walton
- Academic staff: 40 (full-time) and 21 (part-time)
- Students: 285 FTE (2025)
- Doctoral students: 58
- Location: 64 Mercer Street; Princeton, New Jersey, U.S.
- Campus: 23 acres (9.3 ha); Small city
- Colors: Yale Blue and Scarlet
- Website: ptsem.edu

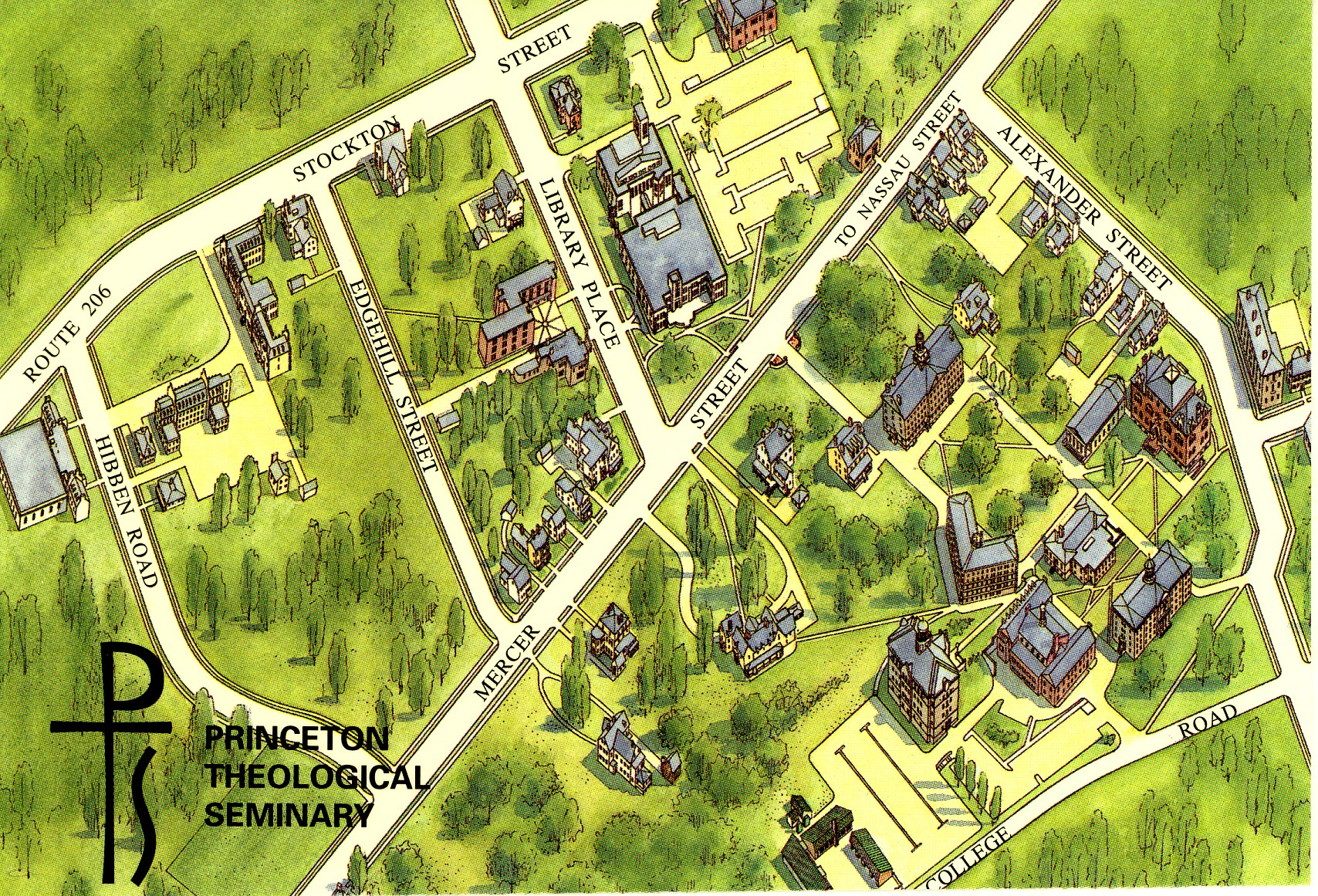

Princeton Theological Seminary (PTSem), officially The Theological Seminary of the Presbyterian Church, is a private school of theology in Princeton, New Jersey. Established in 1812, it is the second-oldest seminary in the United States, founded under the auspices of Archibald Alexander, the General Assembly of the Presbyterian Church in the United States of America, and the College of New Jersey (now Princeton University). It is also the largest of ten seminaries associated with the Presbyterian Church.

The seminary operates the largest theological library in the United States and the second largest in the world (after the Vatican in Rome). It maintains a number of special collections, including the Karl Barth Research Collection in the Center for Barth Studies. The seminary also managed an endowment of $1.459 billion in 2022, making it the third-wealthiest institution of higher learning in the state of New Jersey after Princeton University and Rutgers University.

In the 1980s, it enrolled about 900 students, but as of Fall 2023, the seminary enrolls approximately 276 FTE students. While around 26 percent of them are candidates for ministry specifically in the Presbyterian Church, the majority are completing such candidature in other denominations, pursuing careers in academia across a number of different disciplines, or receiving training for other, non-theological fields altogether.

The Seminary holds academic reciprocity with Princeton University as well as the Westminster Choir College of Rider University, New Brunswick Theological Seminary, the Jewish Theological Seminary, and the Rutgers School of Social Work.

== History ==
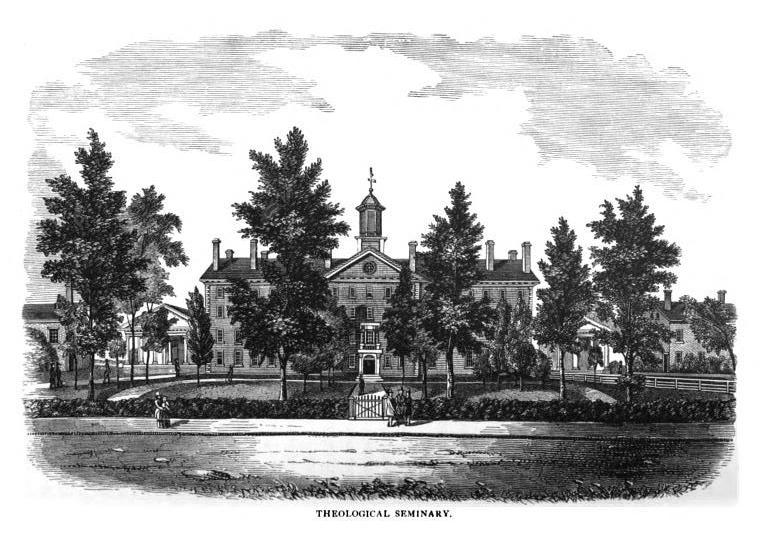
Princeton Seminary in the 1800s

The plan to establish a theological seminary in Princeton was in the interests of advancing and extending the theological curriculum. The educational intention was to go beyond the liberal arts course by setting up a postgraduate, professional school in theology. The plan met with enthusiastic approval on the part of authorities at the College of New Jersey, later to become Princeton University, for they were coming to see that specialized training in theology required more attention than they could give. The General Assembly of the Presbyterian Church established the Theological Seminary at Princeton, New Jersey, in 1812, with the support of the directors of the nearby College of New Jersey, as the second graduate theological school in the United States. The seminary remains an institution of the Presbyterian Church (USA), being the largest of the ten theological seminaries affiliated with the 1-million-member denomination.

In 1812, the seminary had three students and Archibald Alexander was its first professor. By 1815 the number of students had gradually increased, and work began on a building: Alexander Hall was designed by John McComb Jr., a New York architect, and opened in 1817. The original cupola was added in 1827, but it burned in 1913 and was replaced in 1926. The building was simply called "Seminary" until 1893, when it was officially named Alexander Hall. Since its founding, Princeton Seminary has graduated approximately 14,000 men and women who have served the church in many capacities, from pastoral ministry and pastoral care to missionary work, Christian education and leadership in the academy and business.

The seminary became known during the 19th and early 20th centuries for its defense of Calvinistic Presbyterianism, a tradition that became known as Princeton Theology and greatly influenced Evangelicalism during the period. Some of the institution's figures active in this movement included Charles Hodge, B.B. Warfield, J. Gresham Machen, and Geerhardus Vos.

=== Liberalism and split ===
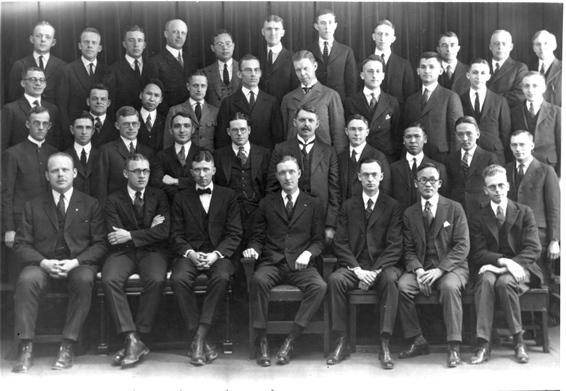
Princeton Seminary class of 1922

In response to the increasing influence of theological liberalism in the 1920s and the fundamentalist–modernist controversy at the institution, several theologians left to form the Westminster Theological Seminary under the leadership of J. Gresham Machen.

The college was later the center of the fundamentalist–modernist controversy of the 1920s and 1930s. In 1929, the seminary was reorganized along modernist lines, and in response, Machen, along with three of his colleagues: Oswald T. Allis, Robert Dick Wilson and Cornelius Van Til, resigned, with Machen, Allis and Wilson founding Westminster Theological Seminary in Glenside, Pennsylvania. In 1958, Princeton became a seminary of the United Presbyterian Church in the U.S.A., following a merger between the Presbyterian Church in the U.S.A. and the United Presbyterian Church of North America, and in 1983, it would become a seminary of the Presbyterian Church (U.S.A.) after the merger between the UPCUSA and the Presbyterian Church in the U.S.

=== Ties to slavery ===
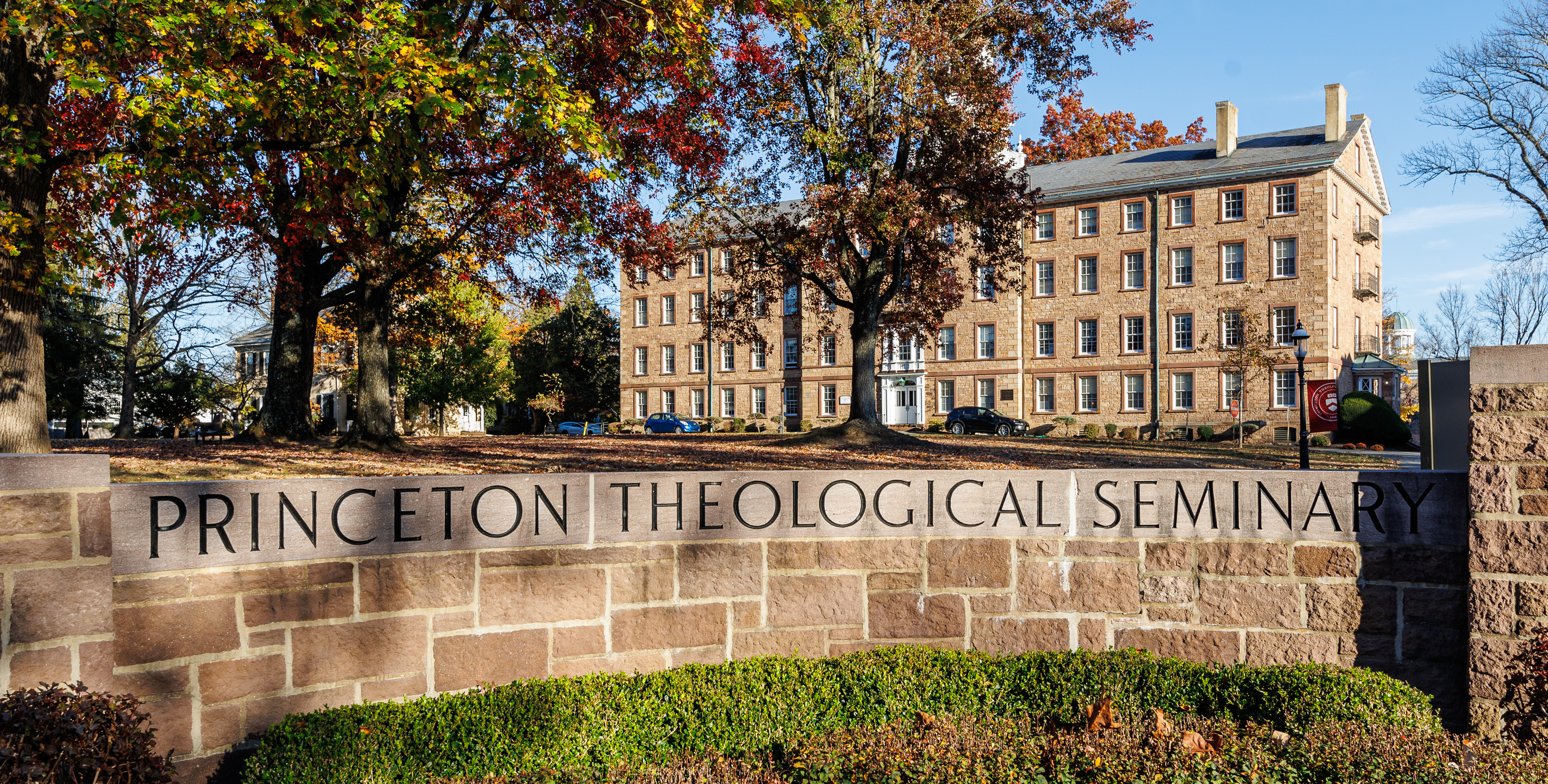
Alexander Hall and Sign

The seminary has extensive historical ties to slavery, including one of its first professors and 2nd principal Charles Hodge, who was a slave owner and proslavery advocate. Historian William Yoo counts the seminary "among the most complicit educational institutions" for its historical acceptance and propagation of proslavery theology. In 2019, the seminary announced that it would spend $27 million on "scholarships and other initiatives to address its historical ties to slavery".

== Academics ==
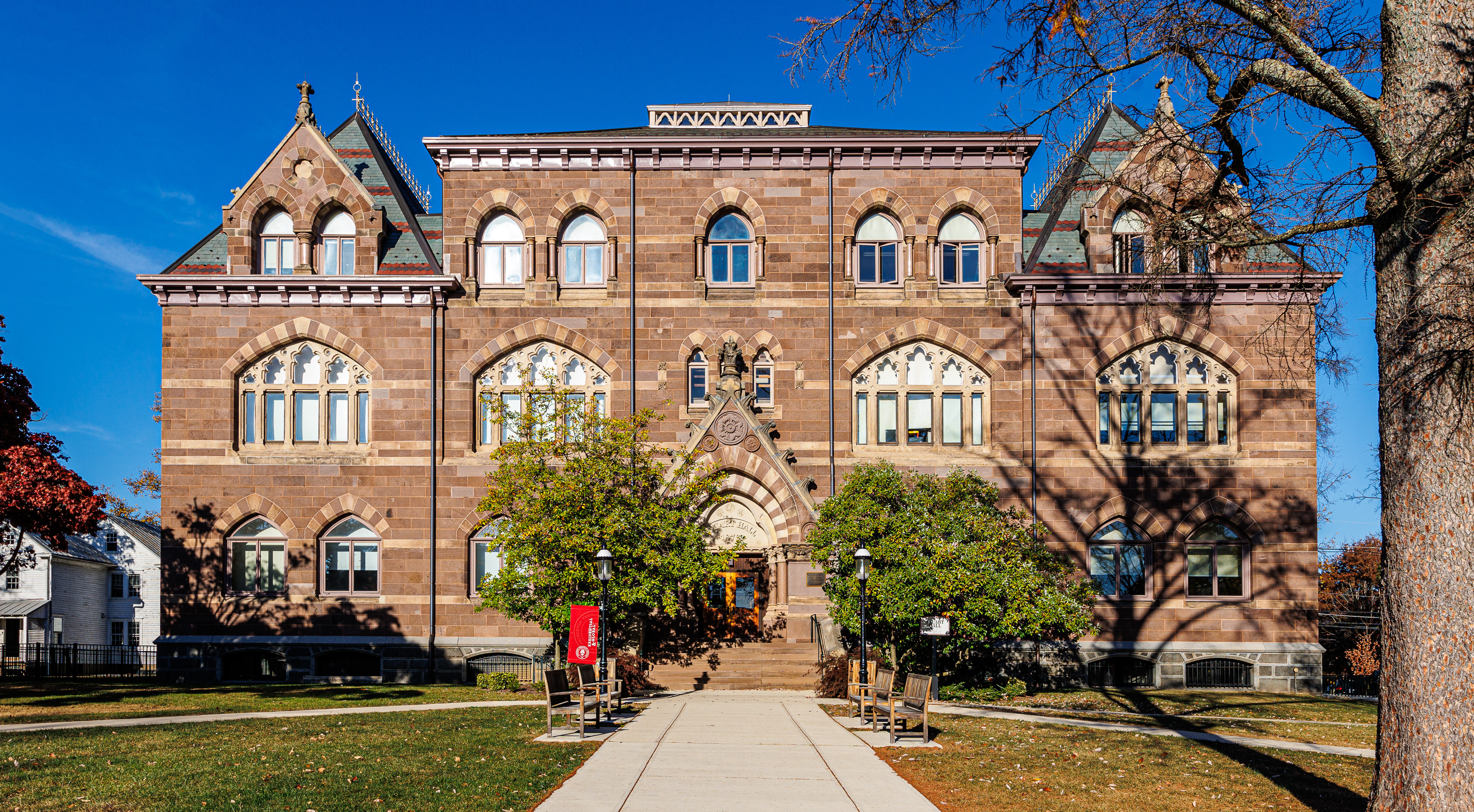
Stuart Hall. The main classroom building of the Princeton Theological Seminary, designed by William Appleton Potter in Venetian Gothic style. Built in 1876.

Princeton Theological Seminary has been accredited by the Commission on Accrediting of the Association of Theological Schools (ATS) since 1938 and by the Middle States Commission on Higher Education since 1968.

=== Degree programs ===
- Master of Divinity (M.Div.)
- Master of Theological Studies (MTS)
- Masters of Arts in Theology & Ecology (MTE)
- Hybrid Master of Arts (Theology, Justice, and Public Life)
- Master of Arts in Christian Education and Formation (MACEF)
- MDiv/MACEF Dual Degree
- Master of Theology (Th.M.)
- Doctor of Philosophy (Ph.D.) in the following areas: Biblical Studies; History and Ecumenics; Practical Theology; Religion and Society; and Theology, Ethics, and Politics.
- Dual M.Div./MSW in partnership with Rutgers School of Social Work

=== Libraries ===
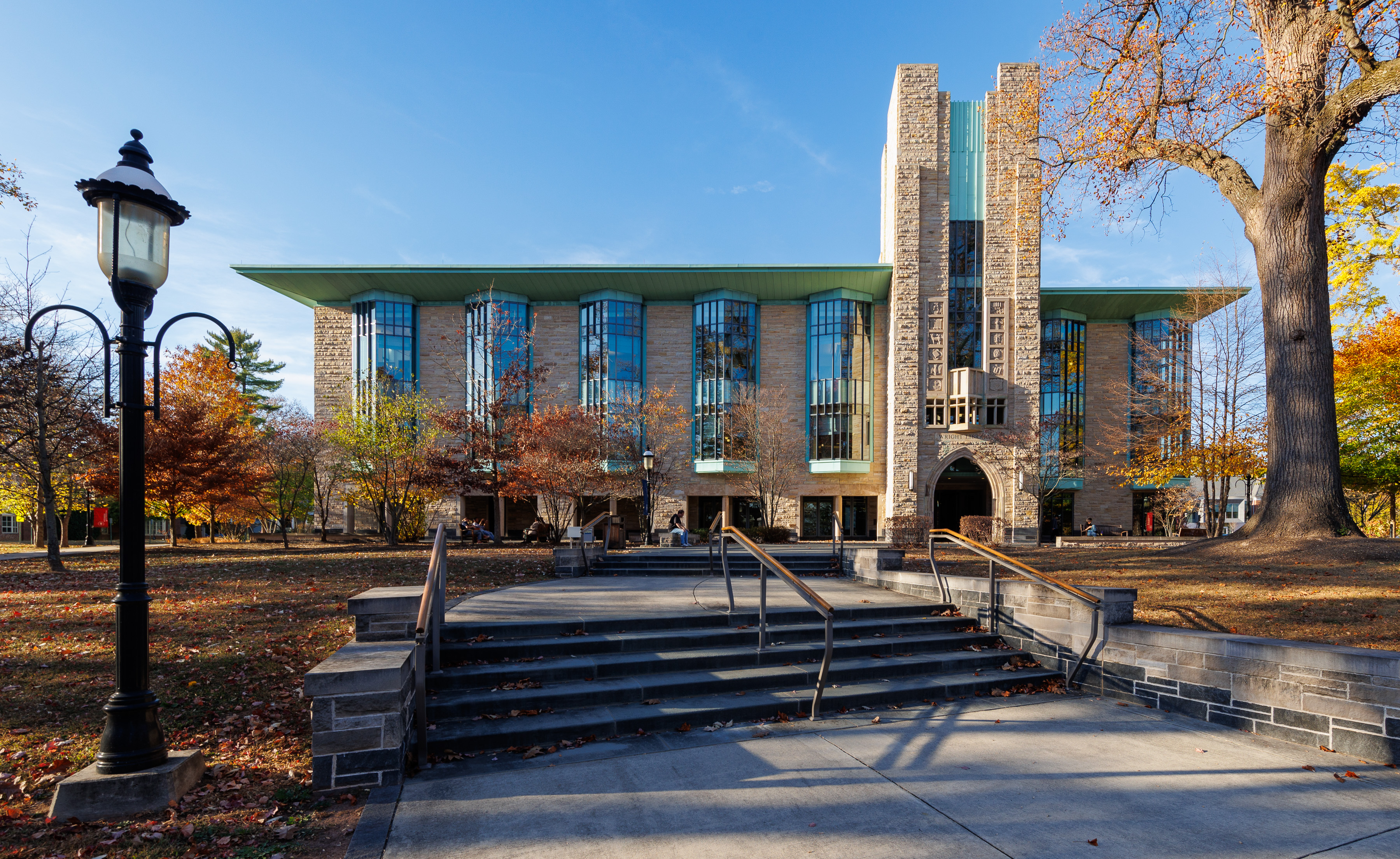
Wright Library

The Wright Library is a destination for visiting scholars from around the world. The current library building was completed in 2013 and was renamed on October 13, 2021, after Theodore S. Wright, the first African American to graduate from Princeton Theological Seminary. The library has over 1,252,503 bound volumes, pamphlets, and microfilms. It receives about 2,100 journals, annual reports of church bodies and learned societies, bulletins, transactions, and periodically issued indices, abstracts, and bibliographies. The libraries are:

- Princeton Theological Seminary Library ("The Wright Library") was opened in 2013 and holds the bulk of the seminary's collection. The library is also home to the Center for Barth Studies, the Reigner Reading Room, and special collections including the Abraham Kuyper collection of Dutch Reformed Protestantism and personal libraries of theologians like Ashbel Green, William Buell Sprague, Joseph Addison Alexander, Alexander Balloch Grosart, William Henry Green, Samuel Miller, and B. B. Warfield.
- Speer Library was opened in 1957 and named in honor of the renowned missionary statesman Robert E. Speer. It was closed in late 2010 and was replaced by the new library.
- Henry Luce III Library, dedicated in 1994 and named in honor of a distinguished trustee, Henry W. Luce, has 350,000 volumes and 250 readers. This library merged with Wright Library in 2013.

=== Rankings ===
Given its status as an autonomous postgraduate institution, Princeton Seminary does not appear in most global or national rankings for universities and colleges. As a graduate school, however, it does see such ranking on occasion. In 2020, it was ranked #53 nationwide – tied with University of Iowa and University of Florida – for the field of history by the U.S. News & World Report. It was also rated at A+ by the American rankings and review company Niche in 2020. The journal First Things, an organ of the Institute on Religion and Public Life in New York, ranked Princeton Seminary fifth among American graduate programs in theology, in 2012.

== Student life ==
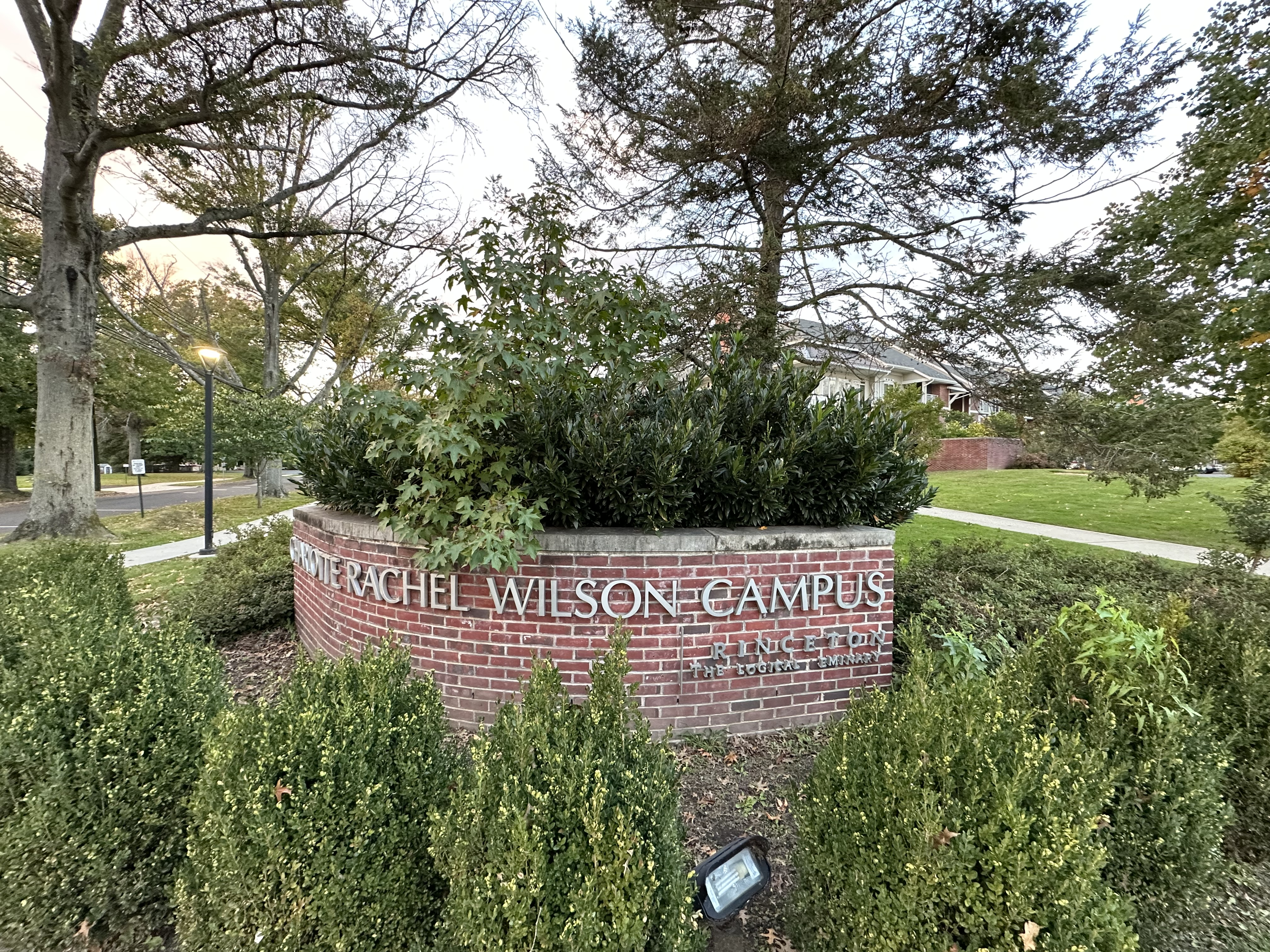
The physically separate Charlotte Rachel Wilson Campus is where residential quarters are.

In 2024, 103 degrees were awarded, 45.6% to women, and 54.4% to men.

=== Seminary Chapel ===
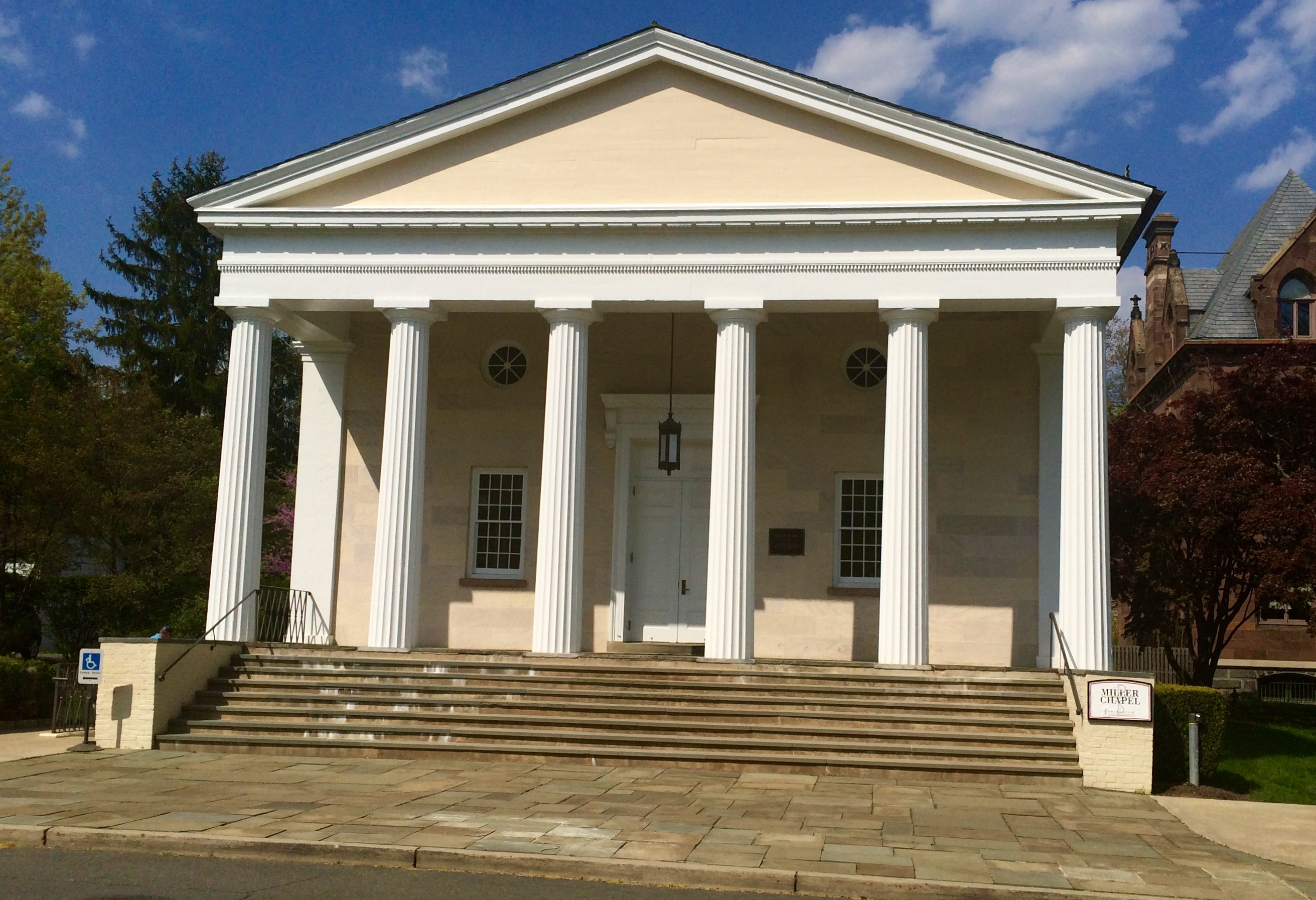
Princeton Seminary Chapel

Built in 1834, Princeton Seminary's chapel was originally named to honor Samuel Miller, the second professor at the seminary. It was designed in the Greek Revival style by Charles Steadman, who also designed the nearby Nassau Presbyterian Church. Originally located beside Alexander Hall, it was moved in 1933 toward the center of the campus, its steps now leading down onto the seminary's main quad. Miller Chapel underwent a complete renovation in 2000, with the addition of the Joe R. Engle Organ.

On January 18, 2022, members of the Association of Black Seminarians physically removed the sign naming the chapel "Miller Chapel" and held a protest calling for the trustees to rename the chapel because of Samuel Miller's direct ties to slavery. On January 25, 2022, the Board of Trustees of Princeton Seminary voted to rename Miller Chapel in light of the protest. "This decision followed thoughtful deliberation by the Board of Trustees, and it is part of their commitment to the ongoing work of confession and repentance that was part of the historical audit on slavery."

== Research ==
=== Center for Barth Studies ===
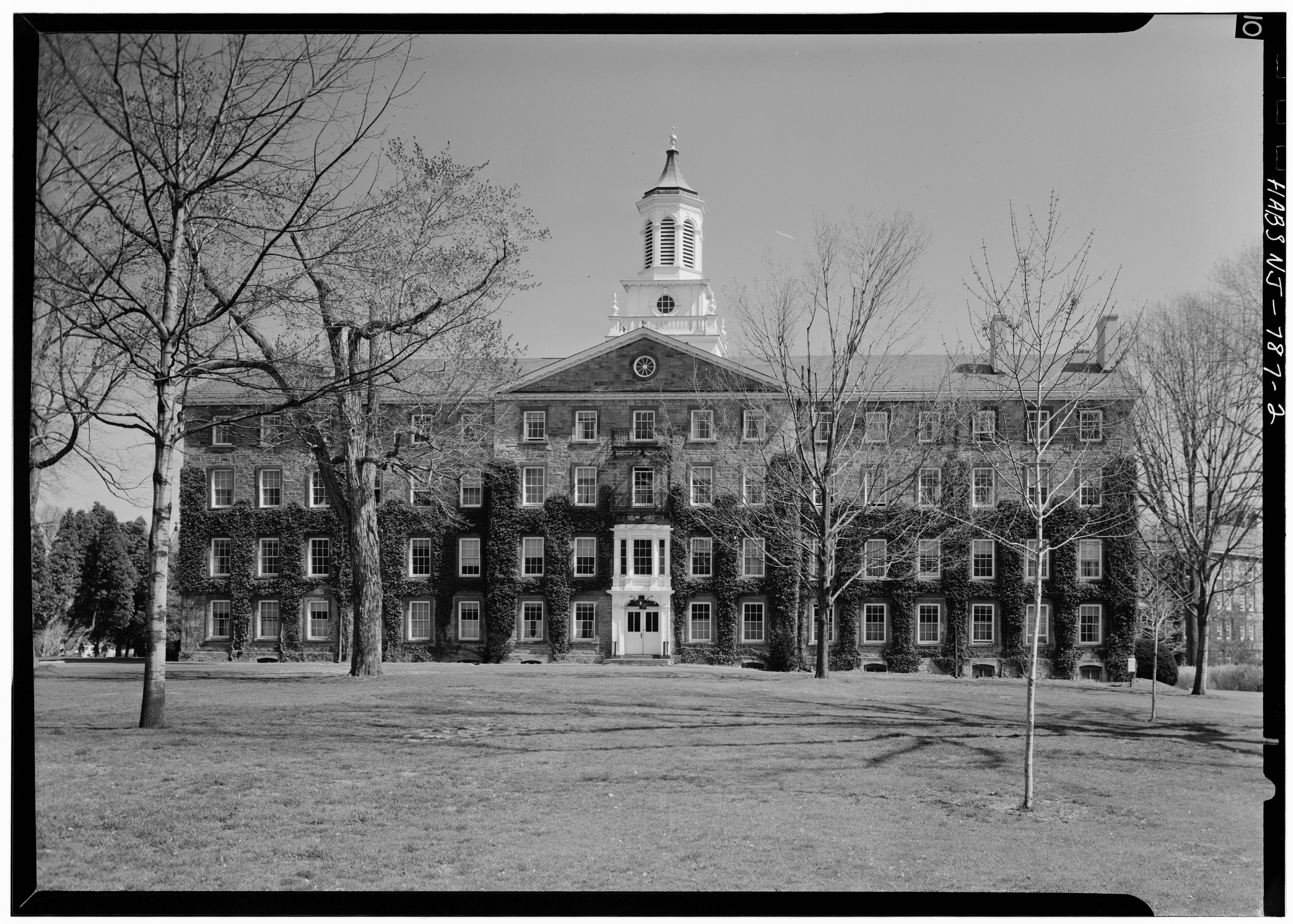
Alexander Hall. The original building of the Princeton Theological Seminary, patterned after Nassau Hall, and designed by John McComb Jr. Built in 1814.

The Center for Barth Studies was established at Princeton Seminary in 1997 and is administered by a board of seminary faculty. The Center sponsors conferences, research opportunities, discussion groups, and publications that seek to advance understanding of the theology of Karl Barth (1886–1968), the German Swiss professor and pastor widely regarded as the greatest theologian of the 20th century. The Karl Barth Research Collection, part of Special Collections in the Princeton Theological Seminary Libraries, supports the scholarly activities of the Center for Barth Studies. The Karl Barth Research Collection is acquiring a collection of writings by and about Karl Barth. Although many volumes are still needed, the Research Collection has already acquired Barth's most important works in German and English, several first editions, and an original hand-written manuscript by Karl Barth.

=== Abraham Kuyper Center for Public Theology ===
The key aspect of the Abraham Kuyper Center for Public Theology is the Abraham Kuyper Collection of Dutch Reformed Protestantism in the library's Special Collections, which focuses on the theology and history of Dutch Reformed Protestantism since the nineteenth century and features a sizable assemblage of primary and secondary sources by and about Abraham Kuyper. The center maintains in partnership with the Vrije Universiteit Amsterdam an online database of secondary literature about Abraham Kuyper.

The center has also established an annual event organized to award the Abraham Kuyper Prize for Excellence in Reformed Theology and Public Life, during which the recipient delivers an address. The Abraham Kuyper Consultation, a series of further lectures, takes place on the following day.

In 2017, there was a controversy surrounding the plan to award the Kuyper Prize to Tim Keller, then Pastor of Redeemer Presbyterian Church in New York City. A group of students and faculty protested that Keller should not receive the award due to his non-affirming views regarding LGBTQ and women clergy. President Barnes initially defended awarding Keller the prize before changing his position. Keller withdrew himself from consideration for the prize and still delivered his lecture. While drawing support from some quarters, the decision to not award Keller the prize also drew criticism in the Wall Street Journal and Washington Post.

=== Center of Theological Inquiry ===
In 1978, Princeton Theological Seminary's Board of Trustees established the Center of Theological Inquiry (CTI) as an independent, ecumenical institution for advanced theological research, "to inquire into the relationship between theological disciplines, [and of these with] ... both human and natural sciences, to inquire into the relationship between diverse religious traditions ..., to inquire into the present state of religious consciousness in the modern world, and to examine such other facets of religion in the modern world as may be appropriate ..." Today, the CTI has its own board, funding, mission and staff. The present director is Tom Greggs and the associate director is Joshua Mauldin.

=== Journals ===
Princeton Theological Review, Volume 1, Number 1 (1903)

Theology Today is a peer-reviewed, quarterly journal of Christian theology founded in 1944.

Koinonia Journal was a graduate student journal published annually by doctoral students at Princeton Theological Seminary from 1989-2011. The publication and its annual forum promoted written and face-to-face interdisciplinary discussion about issues in theology and the study of religion. The forum is still ongoing despite the journal's having ceased publication.

Princeton Theological Review was another graduate student journal that existed to serve students within the Princeton Theological Seminary body as well as the wider theological community. First published from 1903-1929 as the seminary's journal, it was revived as a student publication in 1994 and continued until 2019.

=== Seminary Lectureships ===
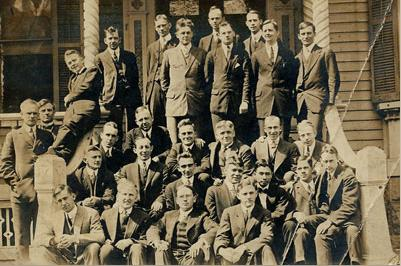
Kagawa Toyohiko at Princeton Theological Seminary, 1914

- Abraham Kuyper Lecture and Prize, held in April. In 2017, Princeton Theological Seminary reversed its decision to award the Kuyper Prize to Tim Keller after a group of alumni voiced their objection to the choice due to Keller belonging to a denomination (Presbyterian Church in America) that ordain neither women nor practicing homosexuals. However, the seminary did allow Keller to deliver the Kuyper Lecture without receiving the Kuyper Prize.
- The Alexander Thompson Lecture, held biannually in March.
- The Frederick Neumann Memorial Lecture, held biannually in November.
- Dr. Geddes W. Hanson Lecture, held biannually, fall semester.
- Dr. Martin Luther King Jr. Lecture, held in February.
- Dr. Sang Hyun Lee Lecture, held biannually, spring semester.
- The Donald Macleod/Short Hills Community Congregational Church Preaching Lectureship, held biannually, fall semester.
- Toyohiko Kagawa, Japanese Evangelist and Social Worker; Lecture held triennially spring semester.
- Students' Lectureship on Missions, held biannually, fall semester.
- The Princeton Lectures on Youth, Church, and Culture, held in April.
- The Levi P. Stone Lectures, held biannually in October. Brings an internationally distinguished scholar to the seminary each year to deliver a series of public lectures. Created in 1871 by Levi P. Stone of Orange, New Jersey, a director and also a trustee of the seminary. Previous lecturers include Samuel Colcord Bartlett (1882), Samuel H. Kellogg (1892), Abraham Kuyper (1898), Henry Collin Minton (1902), Herman Bavinck (1908), Archibald Thomas Robertson (1915), Henry E. Dosker (1918), Louis Berkhof (1921), Valentine Hepp (1930), Hendrik Kraemer (1958), Karl Menninger (1969) and Nicholas Wolterstorff (1998).
- Students' Lectureship on Missions, held in October.
- The Annie Kinkead Warfield Lectures, held biannually in March, are a series of lectures which honor the memory of Annie Kinkead Warfield, wife of Benjamin Breckinridge Warfield, distinguished professor of theology at the seminary from 1887 to 1921. Previous distinguished lecturers include Karl Barth (1962), John Howard Yoder (1980), T. F. Torrance (1981), and Colin Gunton (1993).
- Women in Church and Ministry Lecture, held in February.

=== Frederick Buechner Prize ===
Acclaimed writer and theologian Frederick Buechner has long standing ties to Princeton Theological Seminary and the seminary has honored him with the creation of the Buechner Prize for Writing. Princeton sponsored and hosted the Buechner Writing Workshop in June 2015. Also, Princeton Theological Seminary has given copies of Buechner's Telling the Truth to students as part of their graduation.

== People ==
=== Principals and Presidents of Princeton Theological Seminary ===
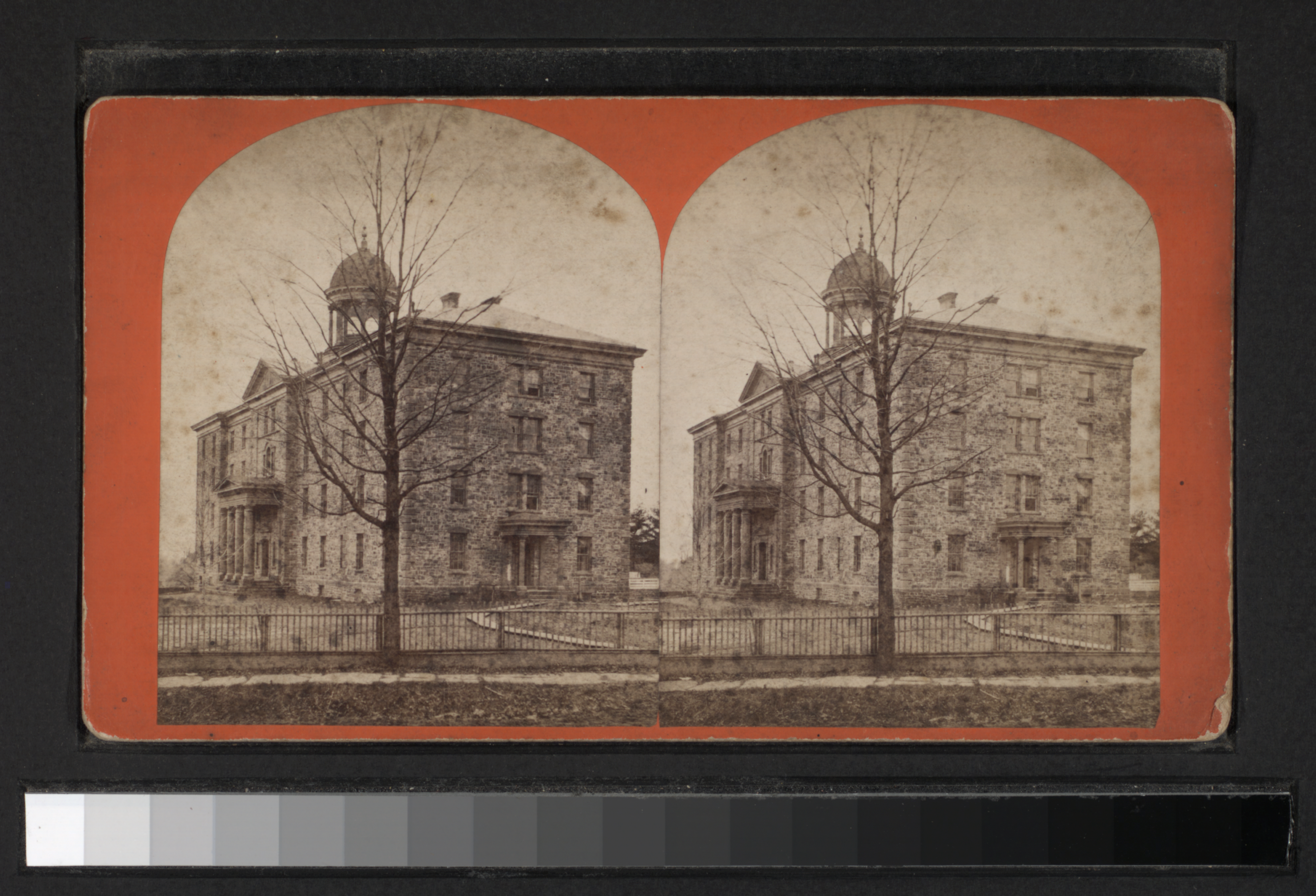
Brown Hall, 1860

Prior to the creation of the office of president in 1902, the seminary was governed by the principal.

Principals

- Archibald Alexander (1812–1850)
- Charles Hodge (1851–1878)
- Archibald Alexander Hodge (1878–1886)
- B. B. Warfield (1887–1902)

Presidents

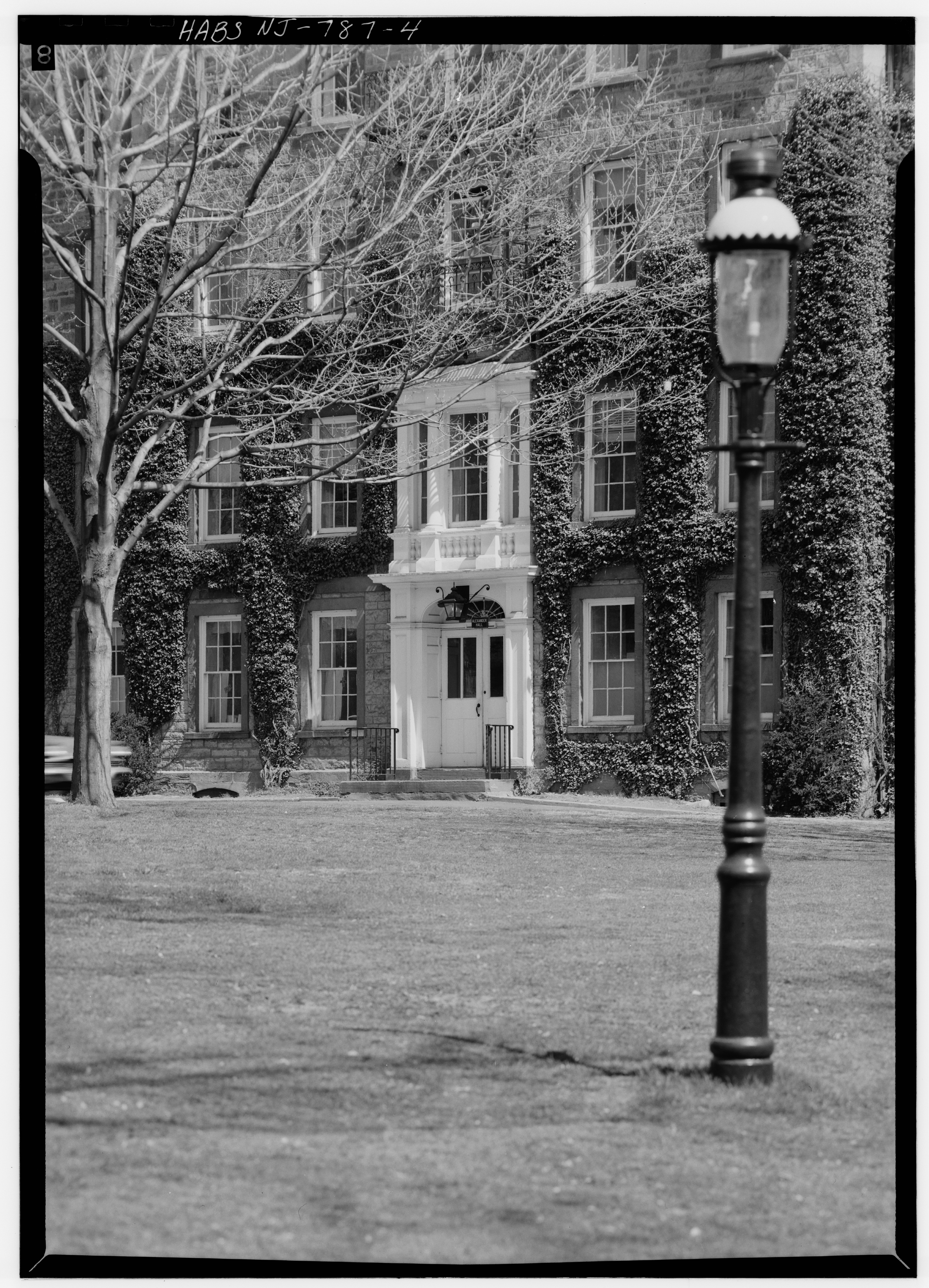
View of front entrance

- Francis Landey Patton (1902–1913)
- J. Ross Stevenson (1914–1936)
- John A. Mackay (1936–1959)
- James I. McCord (1959–1983)
- Thomas W. Gillespie (1983–2004)
- Iain R. Torrance (2004–2012)
- M. Craig Barnes (2013–2023)
- Jonathan L. Walton (since 2023) – first black president, and first non-Presbyterian

=== Notable faculty (past and present) ===
- Diogenes Allen
- Dale C. Allison
- Bernhard Anderson
- William Park Armstrong
- Emil Brunner
- Donald Eric Capps
- James H. Charlesworth
- Ellen Charry
- F. W. Dobbs-Allsopp
- Jane Dempsey Douglass
- Freda Gardner
- L. Gordon Graham
- George Hendry
- John Hick
- Seward Hiltner
- Archibald Alexander Hodge
- Charles Hodge
- Elmer G. Homrighausen
- George Hunsinger
- James Franklin Kay
- J. Gresham Machen
- Bruce L. McCormack
- Bruce Metzger
- Patrick D. Miller
- Samuel Miller
- de:Otto Alfred Piper
- Luis N. Rivera-Pagán
- J. J. M. Roberts
- Katharine Doob Sakenfeld
- C. L. Seow
- Richard Shaull
- Mark S. Smith
- Max L. Stackhouse
- Loren Stuckenbruck
- Mark Lewis Taylor
- Wentzel van Huyssteen
- Geerhardus Vos
- B. B. Warfield
- Robert Dick Wilson
- Robert Jenson

=== Notable alumni ===
- James Waddel Alexander, 1823
- William Patterson Alexander – missionary to Hawaii
- Oswald T. Allis, 1905
- Rubem Alves, 1968 – theologian
- Gleason Archer, 1945 – evangelical theologian
- Albert Barnes, 1823
- Howard Baskerville
- Louis Berkhof, 1904
- Loraine Boettner, 1929
- Greg Boyd, 1987
- James Montgomery Boice, 1963
- William Whiting Borden
- Dave Brat, 1990 – professor, Randolph-Macon College; Congressional candidate in Virginia's 7th District
- Robert Jefferson Breckinridge, 1832
- G. Thompson Brown, 1950 – missionary; founder, Honam Theological Academy (now Honam Theological University and Seminary)
- Hugh M. Browne, 1878 – educator; principal, Institute for Colored Youth
- Ernest T. Campbell – pastor, Riverside Church
- Eugene Cho, 1997 – president, Bread for the World
- Hunter Corbett – pioneer American missionary to Yantai, Shandong, China
- Jack Cottrell
- John Finley Crowe, 1815 – founder, Hanover College
- Michael Simpson Culbertson, 1844 – missionary to China
- Kathy Dawson – Associate Professor of Christian Education and Director of M.A.P.T. Program, Columbia Theological Seminary; Association of Presbyterian Church Educators' 2015 Educator of the Year
- William Dembski, 1995 – philosopher; mathematician; intelligent-design advocate
- Hilliard Dogbe – presiding bishop, African Methodist Episcopal Zion Church (Western West Africa Episcopal District); chairman, Christian Council of Ghana
- John H. Eastwood, 1941 – U.S. Army Air Corps chaplain 464th Bombardment Group in World War II
- Sherwood Eddy, 1896 – missionary to India; leader, YMCA; writer; educator
- Bart D. Ehrman, 1985 – professor; writer
- Anna Carter Florence, 2000
- George Forell
- David Otis Fuller
- Robert A. J. Gagnon, 1993
- George Washington Gale, 1819 – founder, Knox College
- Jim Garlow – pastor, Skyline Church
- James Leo Garrett Jr., 1949 – theologian
- William H. Gray, 1970
- Richard C. Halverson, 1942 – 60th Chaplain of the U.S. Senate
- William Henry Green, 1846
- Francis James Grimké, 1878 – African-American Presbyterian pastor; co-founder, NAACP
- Phineas Gurley – Abraham Lincoln's pastor
- Kyung-Chik Han, 1929 – founder, Young Nak Presbyterian Church; winner, Templeton Prize
- George C. Heckman – presiden, Hanover College 1870–79
- Charles Hodge, 1819
- Elmer George Homrighausen, 1924
- William Imbrie – missionary to Japan
- Sheldon Jackson, 1858 – Presbyterian missionary in the Western United States, including Alaska
- Thornwell Jacobs, 1899 – founder, Oglethorpe University
- Richard A. Jensen, 1962 – theologian; writer
- William Hallock Johnson, 1898 – theologian; president, Lincoln University
- E. Elizabeth Johnson, J. Davison Philips Professor of New Testament, Columbia Theological Seminary
- Toyohiko Kagawa, 1916
- Margaret Grun Kibben, 1986, 2002 – received MDiv and DMin; first female Chaplain of the U.S. House of Representatives
- Guy Kratzer, 1968 – Pennsylvania State Senator
- Kimberly Bracken Long, 1990 – Presbyterian pastor; writer; associate professor of worship, Columbia Theological Seminary
- Elijah Parish Lovejoy, 1834 – first American martyr for freedom of the press; Presbyterian pastor; publisher of an abolitionist newspaper in Alton, Illinois; killed while defending the press from an angry mob
- Clarence Macartney, 1905
- John Gresham Machen, 1905 – founder, Westminster Theological Seminary
- George Leslie Mackay – Canadian missionary to Taiwan
- John Maclean Jr., 1818 – president, Princeton University
- Allan MacRae, 1927 – founder, Faith Theological Seminary and Biblical Theological Seminary
- Basil Manly Jr., 1847
- Carl McIntire – fundamentalist; attended briefly as a student, but transferred to Westminster Theological Seminary in 1929 as a result of Fundamentalist-Modernist controversy
- David McKinney
- Bruce Metzger, 1938
- Samuel H. Moffett, 1942 – missionary; educator
- John Monteith, 1816 – first president, University of Michigan
- Frederick Augustus Muhlenberg, 1839 – educator
- John Murray –theologian
- Byron C. Nelson, 1936 – apologist for creationism
- John Williamson Nevin, 1826
- John Livingstone Nevius – missionary to China
- Harold Ockenga – prominent figure in 1950s Neo-Evangelicalism; attended briefly as a student, but transferred to Westminster Theological Seminary in 1929 as a result of Fundamentalist–Modernist controversy
- Kathleen M. O'Connor
- Jeanne Audrey Powers – leader, United Methodist Church; advocate for women and LGBTQ+ people in the church; one of the first women ordained in the denomination
- Francis Landey Patton, 1865
- Abune Paulos – patriarch, Ethiopian Orthodox Tewahedo Church
- Bradley Phillips, 1849 – member, Wisconsin State Assembly
- Cornelius Plantinga, 1982 – theologian and seminary president
- William Swan Plumer, 1826 – Presbyterian clergyman; writer; educator
- James Reeb, 1953 – civil-rights martyr
- George S. Rentz – ordained in 1909; U.S. Navy chaplain during World War I and World War II
- Joseph L. Roberts Jr. – American pastor
- Jana Riess, 1994
- Jay Richards
- Stanley P. Saunders, 1990
- MacHenry Schafer, 1999
- Samuel Simon Schmucker, 1820
- Louis P. Sheldon, 1960
- Charles Woodruff Shields, 1847
- Robert B. Sloan, 1973 – educator
- DeForest Soaries
- William Buell Sprague, 1819
- Ned B. Stonehouse, 1927
- Loren Stuckenbruck
- Lorna Taylor
- Charles Templeton – Canadian journalist
- Timothy Tennent, 1991
- Mark L. Tidd – U.S. Navy Admiral, 25th Chief of Chaplains
- Conrad Tillard (born 1964; Master of Theology) – Baptist minister; radio host; writer; civil-rights activist; politician
- Henry van Dyke, 1874
- Cornelius Van Til, 1924 – presuppositional apologist; taught briefly, but later followed John Gresham Machen to Westminster Theological Seminary in 1929
- Geerhardus Vos, 1885
- Benjamin Breckinridge Warfield, 1876
- Neil Clark Warren
- Victor Paul Wierwille, Th.M – founding president, The Way International biblical research, teaching and fellowship ministry in New Knoxville, Ohio
- Ralph D. Winter, B.Div – founder, U.S. Center for World Mission and William Carey International University
- Theodore S. Wright, 1828 – first African-American graduate
- John C. Young, 1828 – pastor; fourth president, Centre College
