= Ordination =

Process by which individuals are consecrated as clergy

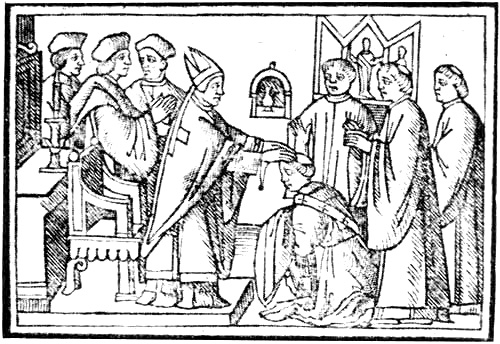
Ordination of a Catholic deacon, 1520 AD: the bishop lays his hands on the ordinand

Ordination is the process by which individuals are consecrated, that is, set apart and elevated from the laity class to the clergy, who are thus then authorized (usually by the denominational hierarchy composed of other clergy) to perform various religious rites and ceremonies. The process and ceremonies of ordination may vary by religion and denomination. One who is in preparation for, or who is undergoing, the process of ordination is sometimes called an ordinand. The liturgy used at an ordination is commonly found in a book known as an Ordinal which provides the ordo (ritual and rubrics) for celebrations.

== Christianity ==
=== New Testament usage ===
Paul's letters do not set out a step-by-step ordination rite, and the New Testament does not present a single, standardized ritual. There was a diversity of local ministerial practices in the first century and the text gives little detail about how people were installed in office. Neither the New Testament nor early church manuals such as the Didache preserve a full ordination order, even though prayer and the laying on of hands occur in several commissioning scenes.

Within the New Testament, laying on of hands serves several functions, including blessing (e.g. Mark 10:16), healing (Mark 6:5; 8:23–25; Luke 4:40), the imparting of the Spirit (Acts 8:14–19; 19:5–6), and the setting apart of particular workers or ministers (Acts 6:1–6; 13:1–3; 1 Tim 4:14; 5:22). Commentators widely regard the appointments in Acts 6:6; 13:3 and the laying on of hands in 1 Tim 4:14; 5:22; 2 Tim 1:6 as acts that set people apart for ministry, and many describe them as forms of ordination or commissioning for specific tasks. At the same time, liturgical historians warn against reading these passages as evidence for a single, fixed ritual identical with later ordination services, since the gesture is used in different ways and the narratives remain brief and ambiguous.

The Pastoral Epistles twice associate Timothy with a laying on of hands (1 Tim 4:14; 2 Tim 1:6). The New International Dictionary of New Testament Theology treats these verses as describing his ordination and notes that the New Testament does not restrict the "power of ordination" to a single office, since it is God who equips ministers and the laying on of hands expresses the church’s prayer for them. According to Silva (2017), ordination-like acts in the New Testament are performed not only by apostles, but also by groups of prophets and teachers and by councils of elders, and Anderson (2010) further argues that delegates such as Timothy (and possibly Titus) share in this role when they appoint other ministers. Social-historical studies done by David Verner (1983) of the Pastorals argue that these letters portray a "synthesis of charisma and office," in which a spiritual gift is recognized or conferred "with the laying on of hands" while Timothy is also given ongoing administrative responsibilities.

Lexically, several Greek terms are relevant. The noun epíthesis cheirōn ("laying on of hands") appears in a small group of passages and is consistently linked with intercessory prayer rather than with an automatic transfer of power. Reference works also distinguish between verbs of appointment. Cheirotonein originally meant "to elect by a show of hands" in classical Greek, and early Christian usage broadened related terms (cheirotonia, cheirotonein) from election to the whole process of ministerial appointment, including prayer with laying on of hands. By contrast, kathistānai is a common verb for "appoint" or "put in charge" without an inherent ritual meaning (e.g. Titus 1:5).

Some first-century Christian communities commissioned leaders by prayer and the laying on of hands, but that this procedure was neither universal nor fully described, and appointments or consecrations could take place without a detailed investiture rite. Later Christian ordination rites drew on these New Testament examples, together with Old Testament and Jewish precedents, but developed more elaborate and standardized ceremonies than the New Testament itself records.

=== Catholic, Orthodox, Lutheran and Anglican churches ===
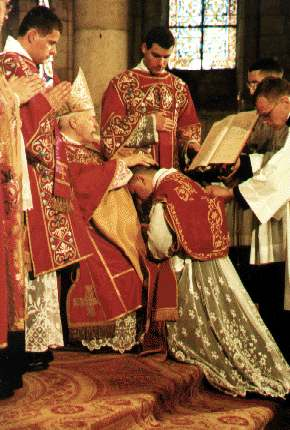
Ordination of a Catholic priest in the extraordinary form of the Roman Rite, 2007

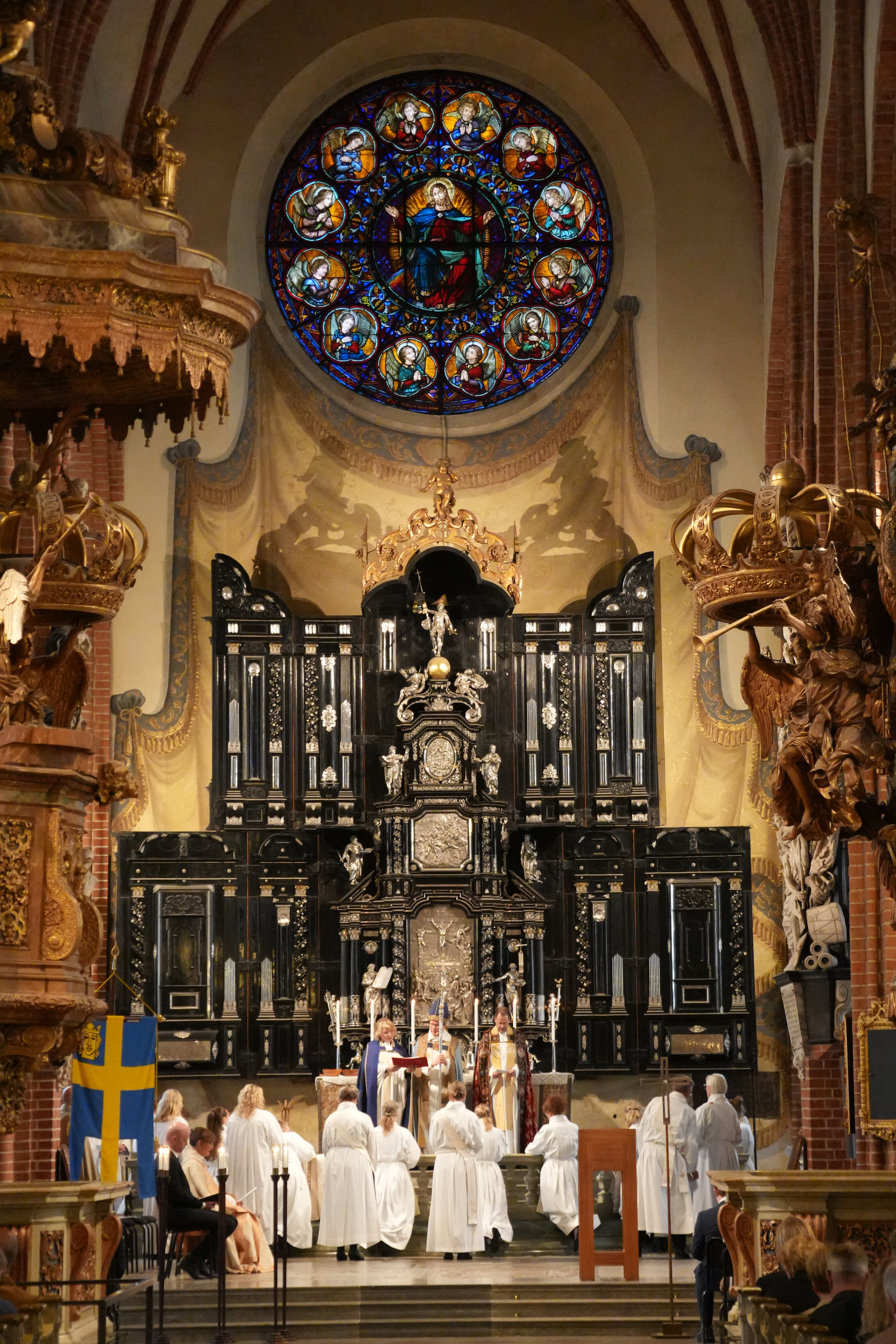
The ordination of Lutheran priests and deacons in Stockholm Cathedral

In Catholicism and Orthodoxy, ordination is one of the seven sacraments, variously called holy orders or cheirotonia ("Laying on of Hands").

Apostolic succession is considered an essential and necessary concept for ordination in the Catholic, Orthodox, High Church Lutheran, Moravian, and Anglican traditions, with the belief that all ordained clergy are ordained by bishops who were ordained by other bishops tracing back to bishops ordained by the Apostles who were ordained by Christ, the great High Priest (Hebrews 7:26, Hebrews 8:2), who conferred his priesthood upon his Apostles (John 20:21–23, Matthew 28:19–20, Mark 16:15–18, and Acts 2:33).

There are three ordinations in Holy Orders: deacon, presbyter, and bishop. Both bishops and presbyters are priests and have authority to celebrate the Eucharist. In common use, however, the term priest, when unqualified, refers to the order of presbyter, whereas presbyter is mainly used in rites of ordination and other places where a technical and precise term is required.

Ordination of a bishop is performed by several bishops; ordination of a priest or deacon is performed by a single bishop. The ordination of a new bishop is also called a consecration. Many ancient sources specify that at least three bishops are necessary to consecrate another, e.g., the 13th Canon of the Council of Carthage (AD 394) states, "A bishop should not be ordained except by many bishops, but if there should be necessity he may be ordained by three," and the first of "The Canons of the Holy and Altogether August Apostles" states, "Let a bishop be ordained by two or three bishops," while the second canon thereof states, "Let a presbyter, deacon, and the rest of the clergy, be ordained by one bishop"; the latter canons, whatever their origin, were imposed on the universal church by the Seventh Ecumenical Council, the Second Council of Nicaea, in its first canon.

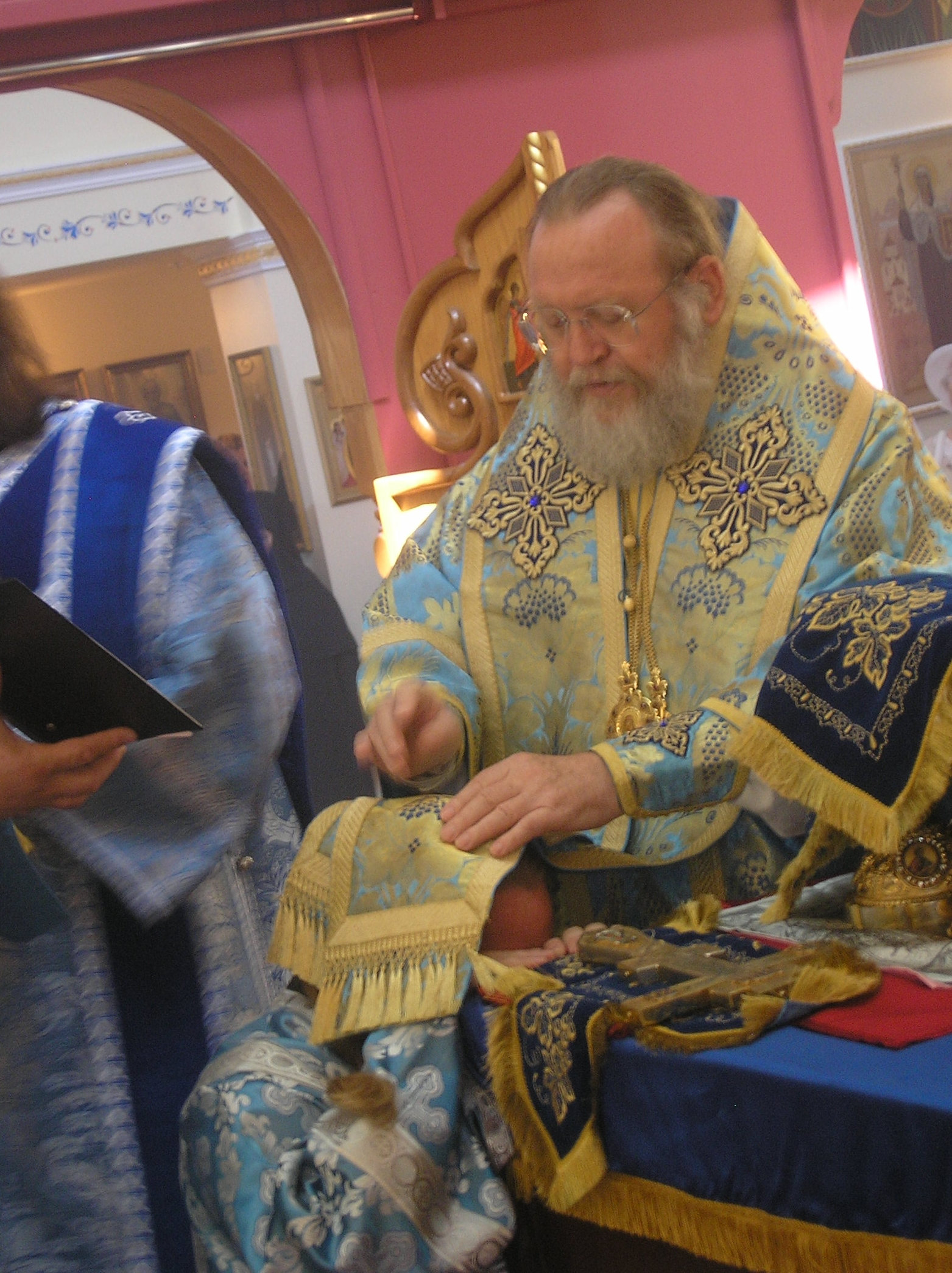
Ordination of an Orthodox. The deacon being ordained is kneeling with the bishop's omophorion over his head as the bishop blesses him immediately before the Cheirotonia.

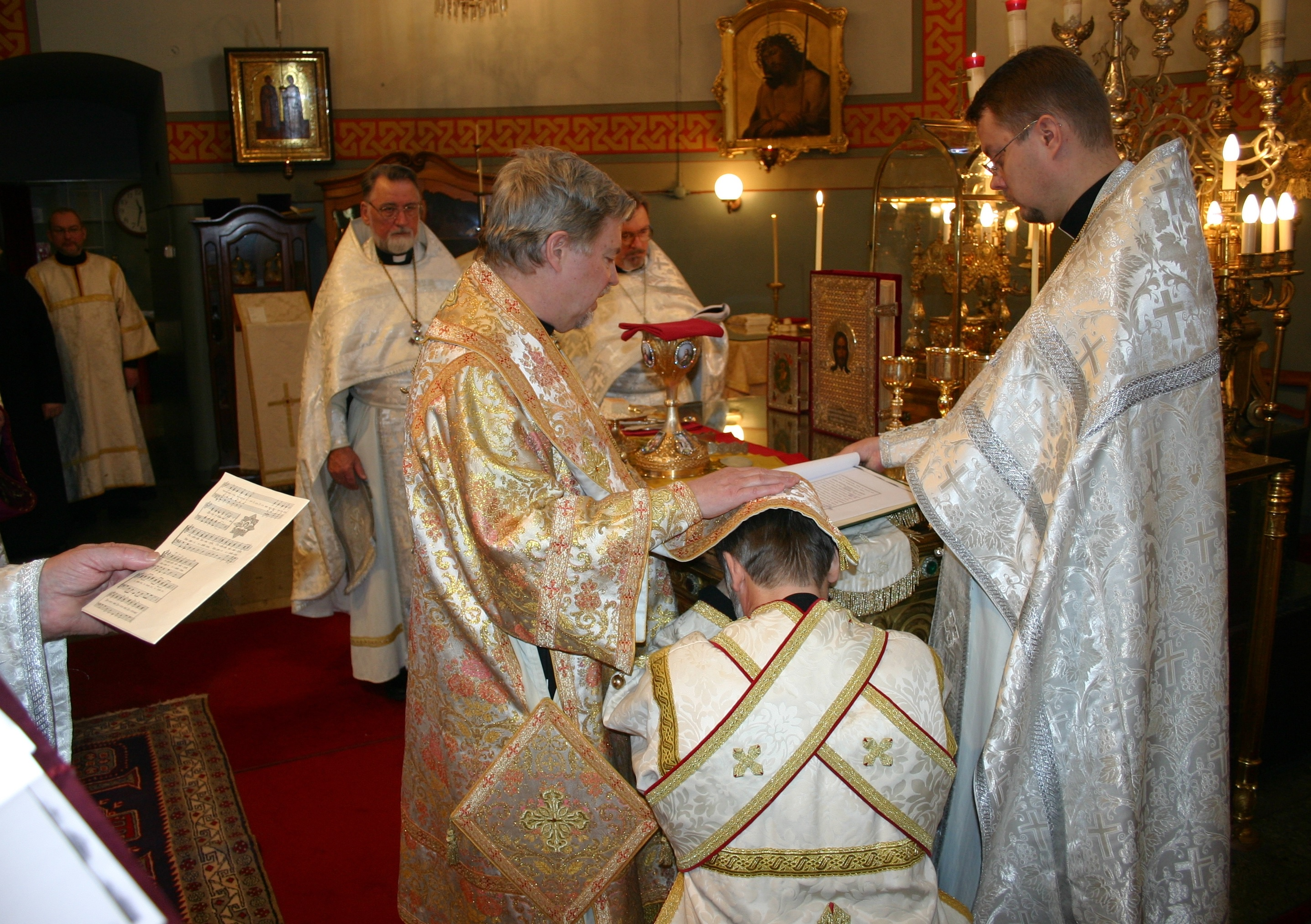
Eastern Orthodox subdeacon being ordained to the diaconate. The bishop has placed his omophorion and right hand on the candidate's head and is reading the Prayer of Cheirotonia.

==== Details peculiar to the various denominations ====
The Catholic Church teaches that one bishop is sufficient to consecrate a new bishop validly (that is, for an episcopal ordination actually to take place). In most Christian denominations that retain the practice of ordination, only an already ordained (consecrated) bishop or the equivalent may ordain bishops, priests, and deacons. However, Canon Law requires that bishops always be consecrated with the mandate (approval) of the Pope, as the guarantor of the Church's unity. Moreover, at least three bishops are to perform the consecration, although the Apostolic See may dispense from this requirement in extraordinary circumstances (for example, in missionary settings or times of persecution).

In the Catholic Church, those deacons destined to be ordained priests are often termed transitional deacons; those deacons who are married before being ordained, as well as any unmarried deacons who chose not to be ordained priests, are called permanent deacons. Those married deacons who become widowers have the possibility of seeking ordination to the priesthood in exceptional cases.

Among the Eastern Orthodox churches, the Ecumenical Patriarch of Constantinople recognized Anglican orders as valid, followed by the autocephalous Orthodox churches of Alexandria, Cyprus, Greece, Jerusalem, and Romania. While some Eastern churches have in the past recognized Anglican ordinations as valid, the current Anglican practice, in many provinces, of ordaining women to the priesthood—and, in some cases, to the episcopate—has caused the Orthodox generally to question earlier declarations of validity and hopes for union. Anglicanism recognizes Catholic and Orthodox ordinations; hence, clergy converting to Anglicanism are not "re-ordained". In 1896, Pope Leo XIII issued the papal bull Apostolicae Curae, which declared Anglican orders "absolutely null and utterly void." While the Vatican has not officially retracted the statement, Roman Catholic actions after the issuance of the bull imply varying positions on the matter. In modern times, the Pope has on several occasions gifted to the Archbishop of Canterbury signs of ecclesiastical office, including a crozier, an episcopal ring, and a Eucharistic chalice, signaling a softening on the Roman view of Anglican orders. In addition, under Pope Francis' tenure, an Anglican bishop was allowed to celebrate mass on the altar of the Archbasilica of Saint John Lateran, the seat of the Pope's own bishopric.

With respect to Lutheranism, "the Catholic Church has never officially expressed its judgement on the validity of orders as they have been handed down by episcopal succession in these two national Lutheran churches" (the Evangelical Lutheran Church of Sweden and the Evangelical Lutheran Church of Finland) though it does "question how the ecclesiastical break in the 16th century has affected the apostolicity of the churches of the Reformation and thus the apostolicity of their ministry".

Some Eastern Orthodox churches recognize Catholic ordinations while others "re-ordain" Catholic clergy (as well as Anglicans) who convert. However, both the Catholic and Anglican churches recognize Orthodox ordinations.

In the Catholic and Anglican churches, ordinations have traditionally been held on Ember Days, though there is no limit to the number of clergy who may be ordained at the same service. In the Eastern Orthodox Church, ordinations may be performed any day of the year on which the Divine Liturgy may be celebrated (and deacons may also be ordained at the Presanctified Liturgy), but only one person may be ordained to each order at any given service, that is, at most one bishop, one presbyter, and one deacon may be ordained at the same liturgy.

==== Notes ====
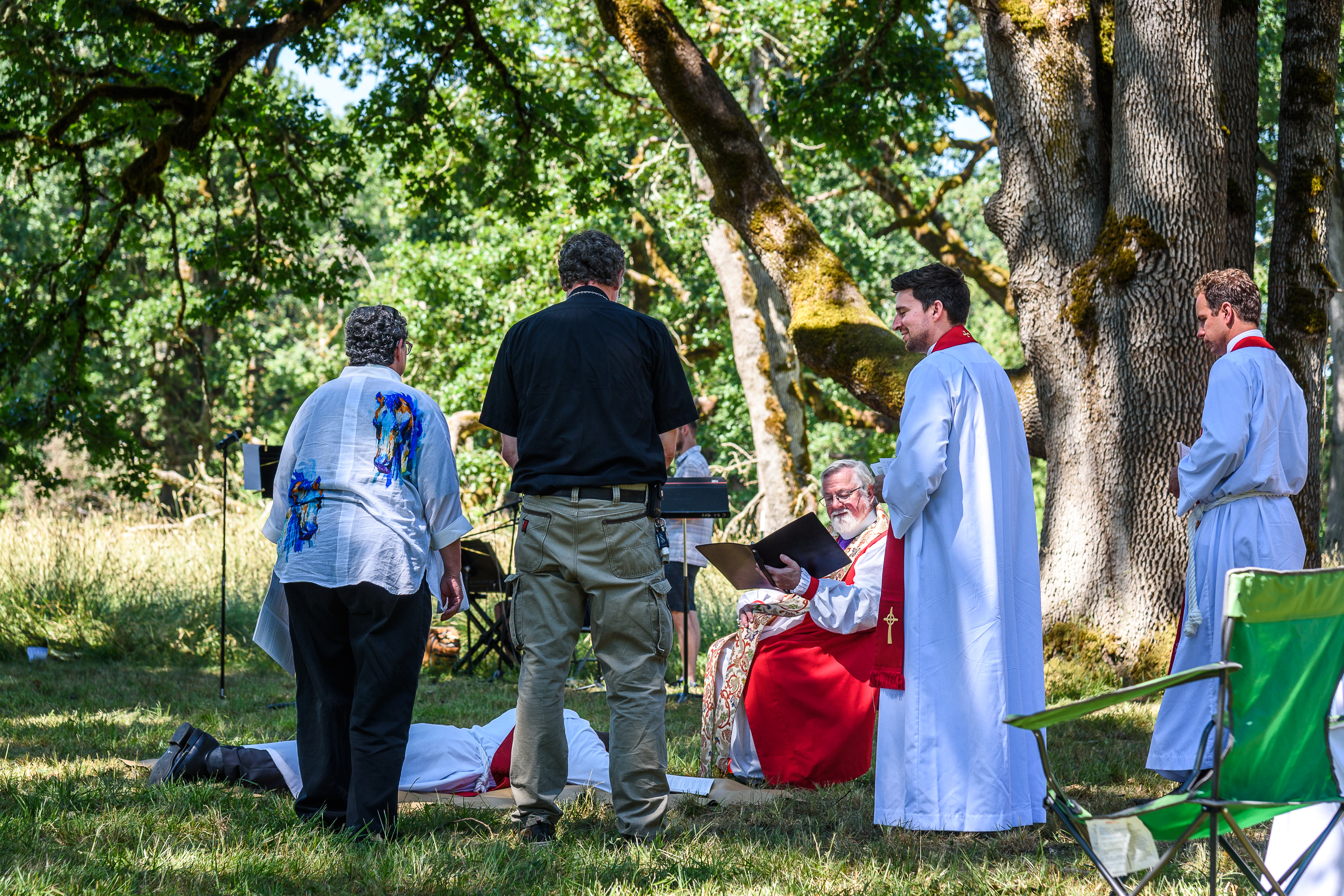
In an outdoor Anglican ordination service, a deacon being ordained to the priesthood prostrates himself before the seated bishop.

- There have long existed orders of clergy below that of deacon. In the Eastern Orthodox and Oriental Orthodox churches (and, until 1970, in the Catholic Church), a person has to be tonsured a cleric and be ordained to sundry minor orders prior to being ordained a deacon. Although a person may be said to be ordained to these orders, such ordinations are not reckoned as part of the sacrament of Holy Orders; in the Eastern Orthodox, the term Cheirothesia ("imposition of hands") is used for such ordinations in contrast to Cheirotonia ("laying on of hands") for ordinations of deacons, presbyters, and bishops.
- The following are positions that are not acquired by ordination:
  - Becoming a monk or nun or, generally, a member of a religious order, which is open to men and women; men in religious orders may or may not be ordained. Anglican nuns may, like their male counterparts, be ordained as well.
  - Offices and titles such as pope, patriarch, archbishop, archpriest, archimandrite, archdeacon, etc., which are given to ordained persons for sundry reasons, e.g., to rank them or honor them.
  - Cardinals are simply a large collegiate body who are electors of and the senior-most counselors to the Pope, and are not a fourth order beyond bishop. At presently nearly all cardinals are bishops, although several are priests, having been granted a dispensation from being ordained a bishop by the Pope (most of these were elevated by the Pope for services to the Church, and are over 80, thus not having the right to elect a pope or have active voting memberships in Vatican departments). As recently as 1899 there was a cardinal who was a deacon when he died, having been a cardinal for 41 years (Teodolfo Mertel). There have even been noble lay men, or men who only possessed minor orders (now called ministries, and carried out by seminarians and laypeople) who at one time were made cardinals. Cardinals are considered princes in diplomatic protocol and by the Church, and even if they are not ordained bishops and cannot perform episcopal functions such as ordination, they have both real and ceremonial precedence over all non-cardinal patriarchs, archbishops, and bishops. Some have discussed the possibility in Catholicism of having women serve as cardinals or, more realistically in the short-term, as sub-deacons, since they cannot be ordained.
- In the Church of England, the priest of the diocese who oversees the process of discernment, selection and training of ordinands is usually called the "Diocesan Director of Ordinands", commonly shortened to "DDO". He or she may have a team of assistants, who may be called Assistant DDOs or Vocations Advisers.

=== Reformed, Methodist and Pentecostal churches ===
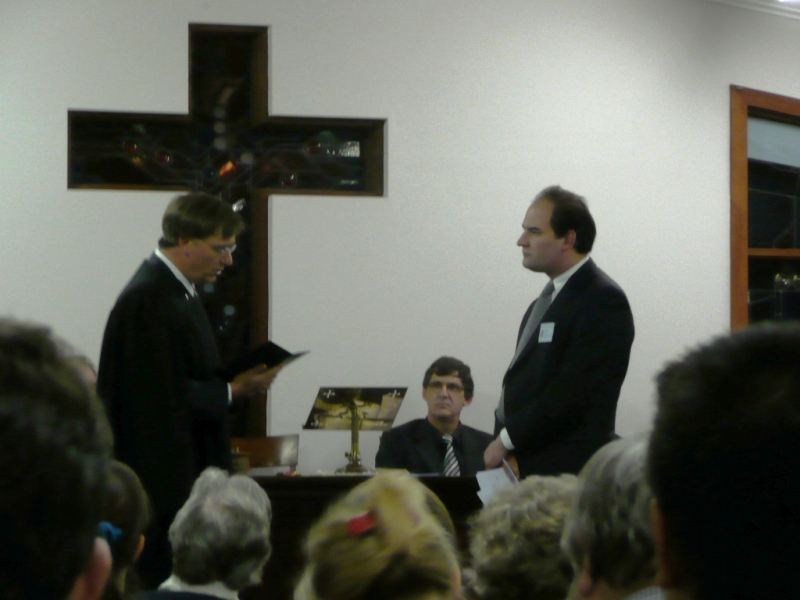
A Presbyterian ordinand making his ordination vows

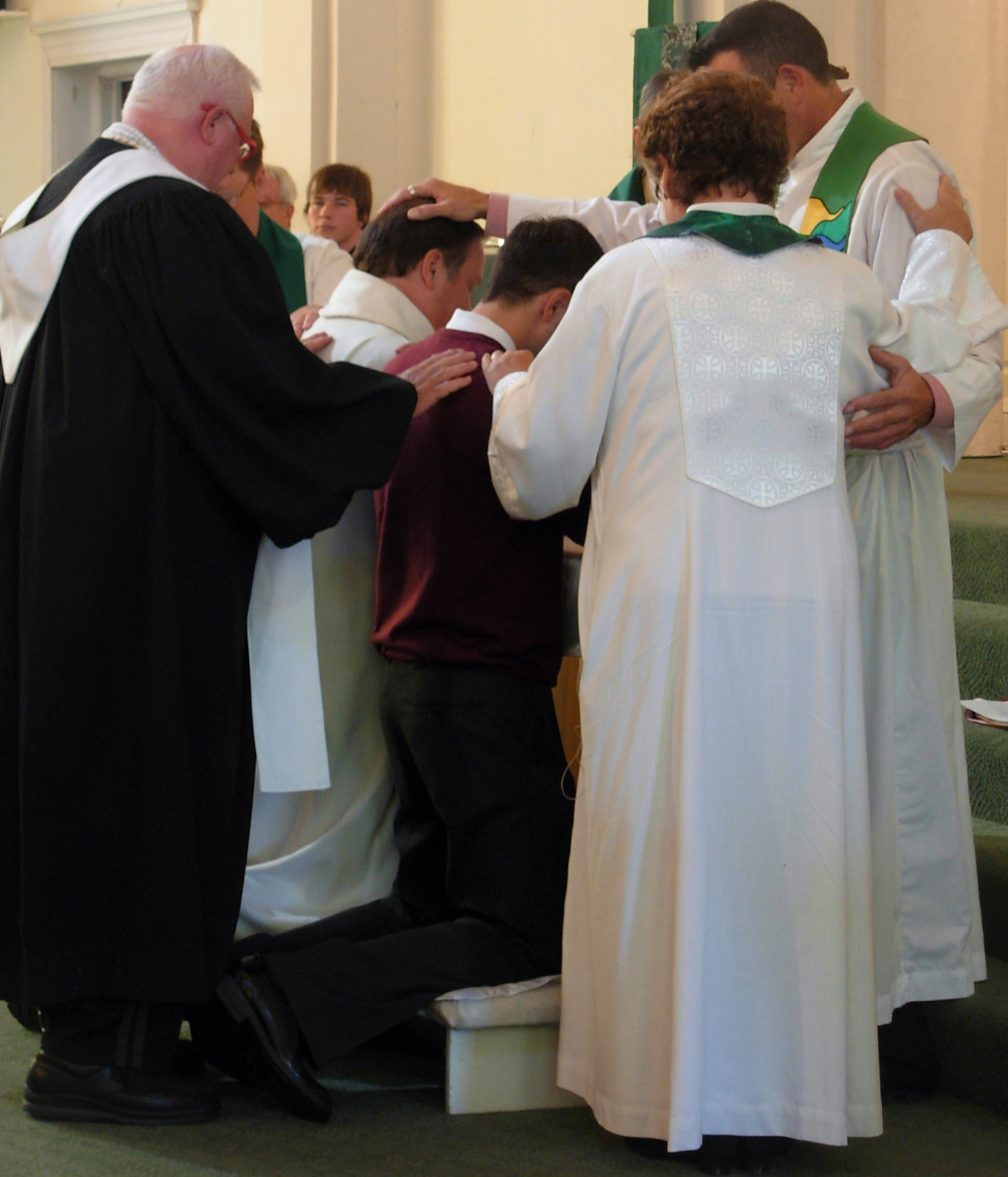
Ordination by laying on of hands in a Metropolitan Community Church

In most Protestant churches, ordination is the rite by which their various churches:

- recognize and confirm that an individual has been called by God to ministry,
- acknowledge that the individual has gone through a period of discernment and training related to this call (e.g. having graduated from a seminary), and
- authorize that individual to take on the office of ministry.

For the sake of authorization and church order, and not for reason of 'powers' or 'ability', individuals in most mainline Protestant churches must be ordained in order to preside at the sacraments (Baptism and Holy Communion), and to be installed as a called pastor of a congregation or parish.

Some Protestant traditions have additional offices of ministry to which persons can be ordained. For instance:

- most Presbyterian and Reformed churches maintain a threefold order of ministry of pastor, elder, and deacon. The order of Pastor, the only one of the three orders considered "clergy", is comparable to most other denominations' pastoral office or ordained ministry. The order of elder comprises lay persons ordained to the ministries of church order and spiritual care (for example, elders form the governing bodies of congregations and are responsible for a congregation's worship life). In many Presbyterian churches, the pastor or minister is seen as a "teaching elder" and is equal to the other elders in the session. The order of deacon comprises lay persons ordained to ministries of service and pastoral care. Those who fill this position may be known as "ruling elders".
- Deacons are also ordained in the Lutheran, Methodist and in most of the Baptist traditions.

For most Protestant denominations that have an office of bishop, including certain Lutheran and many Methodist churches, this is not viewed as a separate ordination or order of ministry. Rather, bishops are ordained ministers of the same order as other pastors, simply having been "consecrated" or installed into the "office" (that is, the role) of bishop. However, some Lutheran churches also claim valid apostolic succession.

Some Protestant churches – especially Pentecostal ones – have an informal tier of ministers. Those who graduate from a bible college or take a year of prescribed courses are licensed ministers. Licensed ministers are addressed as "Minister" and ordained ministers as "Reverend." They, and also Evangelical pastors, are generally ordained at a ceremony called "pastoral consecration".

=== Jehovah's Witnesses ===
Jehovah's Witnesses consider an adherent's baptism to constitute ordination as a minister. Governments have generally recognized that Jehovah's Witnesses' full-time appointees (such as their "regular pioneers") qualify as ministers regardless of sex or appointment as an elder or deacon ("ministerial servant"). The religion asserts ecclesiastical privilege only for its appointed elders, but the religion permits any baptized adult male in good standing to officiate at a baptism, wedding, or funeral.

=== The Church of Jesus Christ of Latter-day Saints ===
In the Church of Jesus Christ of Latter-day Saints, a rite of ordination is performed to bestow either the Aaronic or Melchizedek priesthood (Hebrews 5:4–6) upon a worthy male member. As in the Anglican, Catholic and Orthodox traditions, great care is taken to assure that the candidate for priesthood is ordained by those with proper authority and ordained properly and validly; thorough records of priesthood ordination are kept by the church. Ordination is performed by the laying on of hands. Ordination to the office of priest in the Aaronic priesthood gives the ordained person the authority to:

- baptize converts and children over the age of 8 into the church
- bless and administer the sacrament (the Lord's Supper)
- participate in, or perform, ordinations of others to the Aaronic Priesthood or its offices
- collect fast offerings for the Bishop (usually ordained Deacons and Teachers perform this)

Ordination to the Melchizedek priesthood includes the authority to perform all the duties of the Aaronic priesthood, as well as ordain others to the Melchizedek or Aaronic priesthood, perform confirmations, bless and anoint the sick with oil, bless and dedicate graves, and other such rites. There are five offices within the Melchizedek Priesthood to which one could potentially be ordained:

- Elder
- High Priest
- Patriarch
- Seventy
- Apostle

"Ordination to an office in the Aaronic Priesthood is done by or under the direction of the bishop or branch president. Ordination to an office in the Melchizedek Priesthood is done by or under the direction of the stake or mission president. To perform a priesthood ordination, one or more authorized priesthood holders place their hands lightly on the person's head."

Latter-day Saints believe in a line of priesthood authority that traces back to Jesus Christ and his apostles. LDS adherents believe the church's founder, Joseph Smith, was ordained under the hands of apostles Peter, James, and John, who appeared to Smith as angelic messengers in 1829.

== Islam ==
Islam has no formal clergy or ordained religious leaders. Ordination is viewed as a distinct aspect of other religions and is rejected.

Instead, the faith’s religious leaders are usually called imams, sheikhs, or mawlānā—none of which imply ordination. The title imam (when not referring to the Shi'a doctrine of the Imamate) is given to an individual who leads Muslims in salah; the term can also be used in a linguistic sense for anyone who leads other Muslims in congregational prayers. Sheikh (Arabic: شَيْخ, 'elder' or 'noble') is an Arabic honorific title for a male Islamic scholar or tribal chieftain; shaikhah (شيخة) refers to a female learned in Islamic issues. The title is usually more prevalent in Arabic countries. The word mawlana is a title bestowed upon students who have graduated from a madrasa (Islamic theological academy) throughout the Indian subcontinent. Although Muslim schools, universities, and madrasas might follow different graduation ceremonies upon a student's completion of a 4-year undergraduate program in Islamic studies or a 7–8-year 'alim course, their respective ceremonies neither symbolize nor confer ordination.

== Judaism ==
The ordination of a rabbi within Judaism is referred to as semikhah (Hebrew: סמיכה, 'leaning' or 'laying [of the hands]'; or semicha lerabanim סמיכה לרבנות, 'rabbinical ordination'). The term is derived from the Hebrew verb for "to lean [up]on" (לִסְמוֹך, lismôq) in the sense that prospective rabbis are "to be authorized" as Jewish religious leaders.

While the Hebrew word semikhah is rendered as "ordination" in English, a rabbi is not a priest per se. Rather, ordained rabbis, at least until the 20th century (when the role of rabbis expanded to included pastoral duties) primarily function as Jewish communities' decisors of Halakha (Jewish law) and Torah teachers and scholars. For many Jewish religious purposes, a rabbi's presence is unnecessary. For example, at prayer, a minyan (quorum) of ten laypeople is both necessary and sufficient for the recital of Kaddish—thus the saying "nine rabbis do not constitute a minyan, but ten cobblers can".

Recently, in some Jewish religious movements, semikhah or semicha lehazzanut may refer to the ordination of a hazzan (cantor); some use the term "investiture" to describe the conferral of cantorial authority rather than ordination.

== Buddhism ==
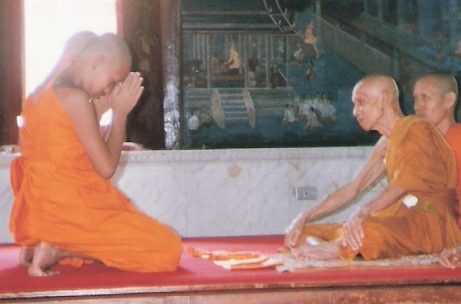
Novitiate Buddhist ordination

The tradition of the ordained monastic community (sangha) began with the Buddha, who established orders of monks and later of nuns. The procedure of ordination in Buddhism is laid down in the Vinaya and Patimokkha or Pratimoksha scriptures. There exist three intact ordination lineages nowadays in which one can receive an ordination according to the Buddha's teachings:

- Dharmaguptaka Lineage
- Mulasarvastivadin Lineage
- Theravada Lineage

=== Mahayana ===
Saicho repeatedly requested that the Japanese government allow the construction of a Mahayana ordination platform. Permission was granted in 822 CE, seven days after Saicho died. The platform was finished in 827 CE at Enryaku-ji on Mount Hiei, and was the first in Japan. Prior to this, those wishing to become monks/nuns were ordained using the Hinayana precepts, whereas after the Mahayana ordination platform, people were ordained with the Bodhisattva precepts as listed in the Brahma Net Sutra.

=== Theravada ===
Pabbajjā is an ordination procedure for samaneras, novice monks in the Theravada tradition.

=== Fully ordained nuns ===
The legitimacy of fully ordained nuns (bhikkhuni/bhiksuni) has become a significant topic of discussion in recent years. Texts passed down in every Buddhist tradition record that Gautama Buddha created an order of fully ordained nuns, but the tradition has died out in some Buddhist traditions such as Theravada Buddhism, while remaining strong in others such as Chinese Buddhism (Dharmaguptaka lineage). In the Tibetan lineage, which follows the Mulasarvastivadin lineage, the lineage of fully ordained nuns was not brought to Tibet by the Indian Vinaya masters, hence there is no rite for the ordination of full nuns. However the 14th Dalai Lama has endeavored for many years to improve this situation. In 2005, he asked fully ordained nuns in the Dharmaguptaka lineage, especially Jampa Tsedroen, to form a committee to work for the acceptance of the bhiksuni lineage within the Tibetan tradition, and donated €50,000 for further research. The "1st International Congress on Buddhist Women's Role in the Sangha: Bhikshuni Vinaya and Ordination Lineages" was held at the University of Hamburg from 18 to 20 July 2007, in cooperation with the university's Asia-Africa Institute. Although the general tenor was that full ordination was overdue, the Dalai Lama presented a pre-drafted statement saying that more time was required to reach a decision, thus nullifying the intentions of the congress.

=== Posthumous ordination ===
In Medieval Sōtō Zen, a tradition of posthumous ordination was developed to give the laity access to Zen funeral rites. Chinese Ch’an monastic codes, from which Japanese Sōtō practices were derived, contain only monastic funeral rites; there were no provisions made for funerals for lay believers. To solve this problem, the Sōtō school developed the practice of ordaining laypeople after death, thus allowing monastic funeral rites to be used for them as well.

=== New Kadampa Tradition ===
The Buddhist ordination tradition of the New Kadampa Tradition-International Kadampa Buddhist Union (NKT-IKBU) is not the traditional Buddhist ordination, but rather one newly created by Kelsang Gyatso. Although those ordained within this organisation are called 'monks' and 'nuns' within the organisation, and wear the robes of traditional Tibetan monks and nuns, in terms of traditional Buddhism they are neither fully ordained monks and nuns (Skt.: bhikshu, bhikshuni; Tib.: gelong, gelongma) nor are they novice monks and nuns (Skt.: sramanera, srameneri; Tib.: gestul, getsulma).

Unlike most other Buddhist traditions, including all Tibetan Buddhist schools, which follow the Vinaya, the NKT-IKBU ordination consists of the Five Precepts of a lay person, plus five more precepts created by Kelsang Gyatso. He is said to view them as a "practical condensation" of the 253 Vinaya vows of fully ordained monks.

There are also no formal instructions and guidelines for the behaviour of monks and nuns within the NKT. Because the behaviour of monks and nuns is not clearly defined "each Resident Teacher developed his or her own way of 'disciplining' monks and nuns at their centres ...".

Kelsang Gyatso's ordination has been publicly criticised by Geshe Tashi Tsering as going against the core teachings of Buddhism and against the teachings of Tsongkhapa, the founder of the Gelugpa school from which Kelsang Gyatso was expelled

== Unitarian Universalism ==
As Unitarian Universalism features very few doctrinal thresholds for prospective congregation members, ordinations of UU ministers are considerably less focused upon doctrinal adherence than upon factors such as possessing a Masters of Divinity degree from an accredited higher institution of education and an ability to articulate an understanding of ethics, spirituality and humanity.

In the Unitarian Universalist Association, candidates for "ministerial fellowship" with the denomination (usually third-year divinity school students) are reviewed, interviewed, and approved (or rejected) by the UUA Ministerial Fellowship Committee (MFC). However, given the fundamental principle of congregational polity, individual UU congregations make their own determination on ordination of ministers, and congregations may sometimes even hire or ordain persons who have not received UUA ministerial fellowship, and may or may not serve the congregation as its principal minister/pastor.

== Ordination of women ==
The ordination of women is often a controversial issue in religions where either the office of ordination, or the role that an ordained person fulfills, is traditionally restricted to men, for various theological reasons.

=== In Christianity ===
The Christian priesthood has traditionally been reserved to men. Some historians, such as Peter Brown and Gary Macy, mention that women were ordained deacons in the first millennium of Christianity. After the Protestant Reformation and the loosening of authority structures within many denominations, most Protestant groups re-envisioned the role of the ordained priesthood. Many did away with it altogether. Others altered it in fundamental ways, often favoring a rabbinical-type married minister of teaching (word) and discarding any notion of a sacrificial priesthood. A common epithet used by Protestants (especially Anglicans) against Catholics was that Catholics were a 'priest-ridden' people. Hatred for priests was a common element of anti-Catholicism and pogroms against Catholics focused on expelling, killing, or forcefully 'laicizing' priests.

Beginning in the twentieth century, many Protestant denominations began re-evaluating the roles of women in their churches. Many now ordain women. According to the biblical book of Judges, a wise and brave woman named Deborah was the fourth judge of the ancient Israelites. She was instrumental in implementing a strategic military strategy that delivered the Israelites from the oppressive Canaanite king Jabin. Likewise, Jael was courageous and primary in the Israelite victory. Her prudent actions killed the commander Sisera after he fled on foot following the battle. Within the Book of Judges, there is a repetitive cycle of sin and deliverance. There is also a proposition regarding the cyclical offenses: "In those days Israel had no king; all the people did whatever seemed right in their own eyes" (Jdg. 21:25). Based partially upon the leadership of the prophetess, Deborah, some Protestant and non-denominational organizations grant ordination to women. Other denominations refute the claim of a precedent based on Deborah's example because she is not specifically described as ruling over Israel, rather giving judgments on contentious issues in private, not teaching publicly, neither did she lead the military. Her message to her fellow judge Barak in fact affirmed the male leadership of Israel. The United Church of Canada has ordained women since 1932. The Evangelical Lutheran Church in America ordains women as pastors, and women are eligible for election as bishops. The Episcopal Church in the United States of America ordains women as deacons, priests and bishops. The Lutheran Evangelical Protestant Church ordains women at all levels including deacon, priest and bishop. Other denominations leave the decision to ordain women to the regional governing body, or even to the congregation itself; these include the Christian Reformed Church in North America and the Evangelical Presbyterian Church. The ordination of women in the latter half of the 20th century was an important issue between Anglicans and Catholics since the Catholic Church viewed the ordination of women as a huge obstacle to possible rapprochement between the two churches.

The Catholic Church has not changed its view or practice on the ordination or women, and neither have any of the Orthodox churches; these churches represent approximately 65% of all Christians worldwide. In response to the growing call for the ordination of women, Pope John Paul II issued the statement Ordinatio sacerdotalis in 1995. In it, he gave reasons why women cannot be ordained, and defined that the Holy Spirit had not conferred the power to ordain women upon the Church. In the wake of this definitive statement, many theologians considered the issue settled, but many continue to push for the ordination of women in the Catholic Church. Some have even begun protest churches.

=== In Judaism ===
Policy regarding the ordination of women differs among the different denominations of Judaism. Most Orthodox congregations do not allow female rabbis, while more liberal congregations began allowing female rabbis by the middle of the twentieth century.

== Ordination of LGBT persons ==
Most Abrahamic religions condemn the practice of homosexuality and the Bible has been interpreted that in Romans 1 that homosexuals are "worthy of death". Interpretation of this passage, as with others potentially condemning homosexuality varies greatly between and within different denominations. Beginning in the late 20th century, and more so in the early 21st century, several mainline denominational sects of Christianity and Judaism in the US and Europe endorsed the ordination of openly LGBT persons. See LGBT clergy in Christianity.

The United Church of Christ ordained openly gay Bill Johnson in 1972, and lesbian Anne Holmes in 1977.

While Buddhist ordinations of openly LGBT monks have occurred, more notable ordinations of openly LGBT novitiates have taken place in Western Buddhism.

== See also ==
- Ordination exams
- Ordination (statistics)
