= YoungSang Ro =

South Korean theologian (born 1954)

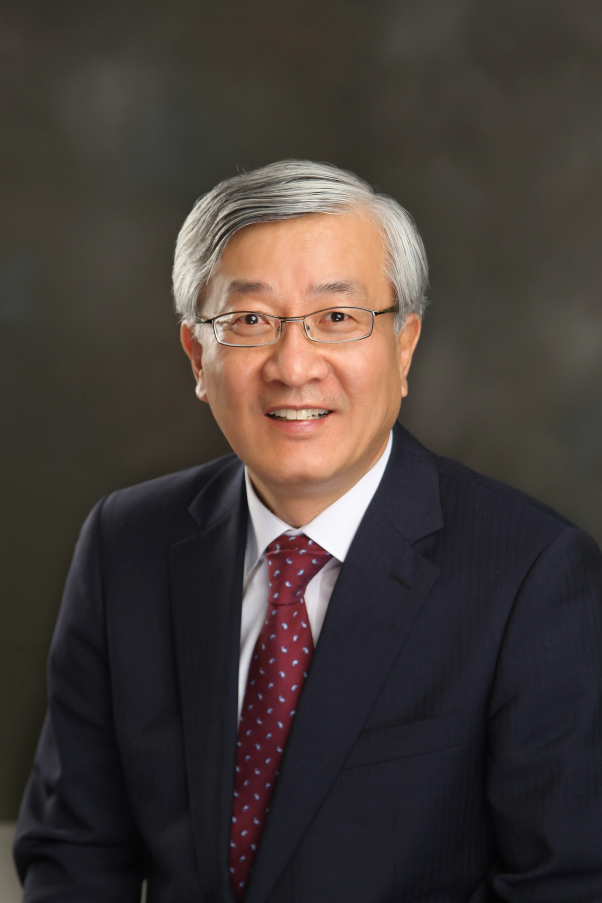
- Professor YoungSang Ro(노영상 박사)
- Born: March 21, 1954 (age 72); South Korea
- Occupations: President, Academic and Theologian
- Known for: Christian Ethics, Religion and Ethics
- Title: Professor of Christian Ethics

Academic background
- Education: Th.B, Th.M., M.Div, Th.D.

Academic work
- Institutions: Graduate School of Practical Theology in Seoul

YoungSang Ro (Korean: 노영상, born March 21, 1954) is a South Korean theologian in the field of Christian ethics as well as a Protestant pastor of The Presbyterian Church of Korea (TongHap). He was a longtime professor and President at Honam Theological University and Seminary, and professor and dean of theological seminary at Presbyterian University & Theological Seminary. As of the fall of 2024, he serves as president of the Graduate School of Practical Theology. He is considered to be one of the important theologians in Korea who was named in Marquis Who's Who in the World, 2018. He specializes in Christian ethics, Christian culture, and Korean unification research. He has written widely on a diverse range of subjects, such as the eco-theology, Christian bioethics, the methodology of Christian social ethics, church and society, future society and future ministry, Christian study on homosexuality, biblical ethics and Christian virtue ethics. He is the leading scholar of the village ministerial movement for the Korean church. He is president of the 23rd Korean Association of Christian Studies. In 2017, he served as a co-chairman of the 500th anniversary of the Reformation. He is currently president of the Korean Church Institute of the General Assembly of the Presbyterian Church of Korea. He was named Theologian of the Year at the 8th John Calvin 500th Anniversary Project in 2018. He is a prominent leader of the village pastoral movement for the Korean church.

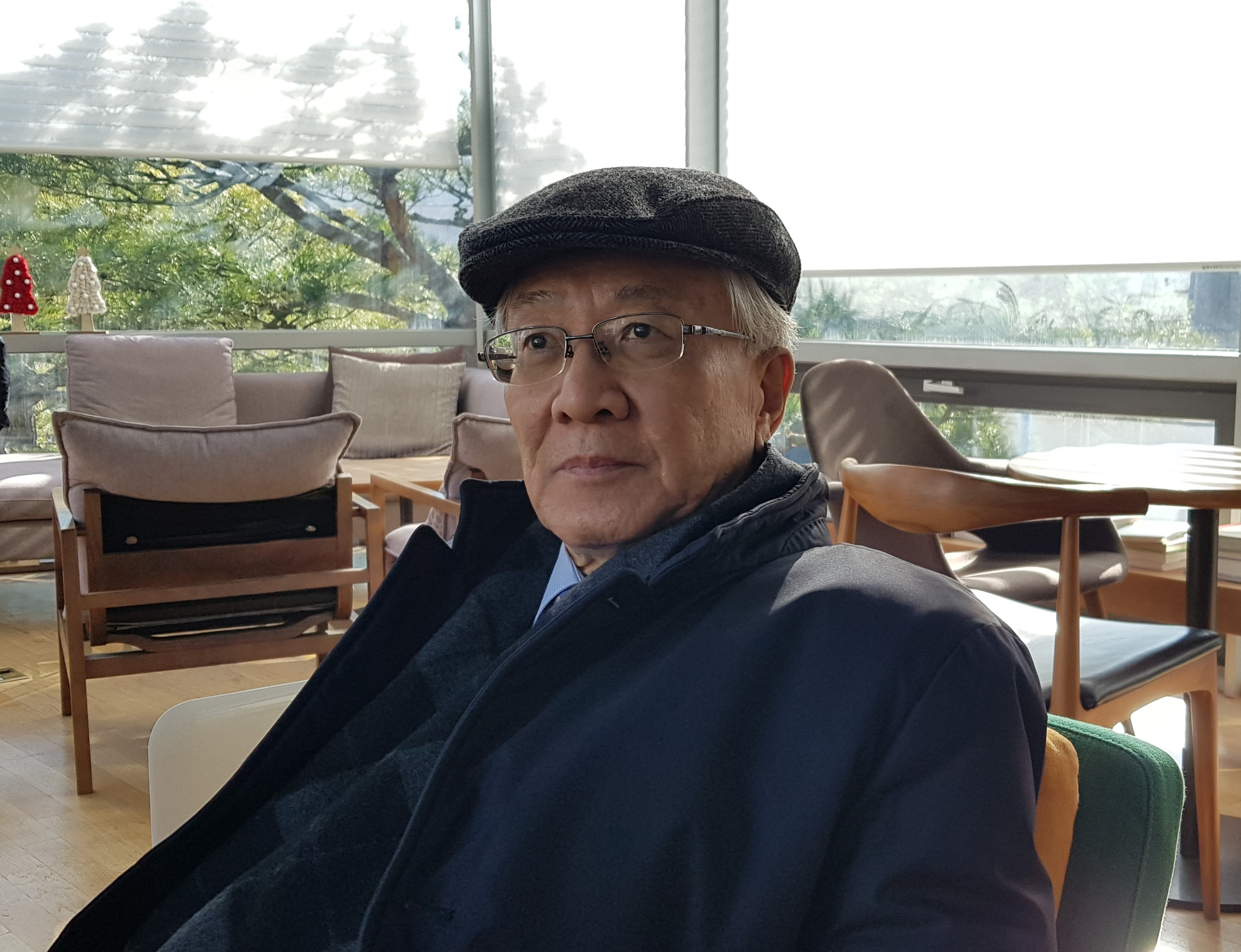
President YoungSang Ro

== Early life and education ==
Young Sang Ro was born in Seoul, Korea, on March 21, 1954. He attended both Kyungbock High School (1969–72). He earned his Bachelor of Agricultural Chemistry(presently the department of applied biochemistry) at Seoul National University. He studied at the Presbyterian University and Theological Seminary (M.Div., Th.M., Th.D.). The theme of his Th. D. dissertation was "A Study on the Concept of Piety in the Christian Ethical Thought of James Moody Gustafson." Ro attended the Korean Presbyterian church, where he experienced baptism and communion.

== Career ==
Following his graduation from the Presbyterian University & Theological Seminary, Ro first taught at Honam Theological University & Seminary which has belonged to the PCK since 1982 before joining the faculty at the Presbyterian University & Theological Seminary in 2000. He has held the following positions: Visiting Fellow of Columbia Theological Seminary(1991–1992). He was appointed as the sixth president of Honam Theological University and Seminary (HTUS) in 2012. He was later invited to assume a faculty position at Baekseok University in 2017. He was the president of Honam Theological University and Seminary from 2012 to 2016, and the president of Korean Association of Christian Studies from 2015 to 2017, and co-chairman of Preparation Committee for 2017 Academic Conference of the 500th Anniversary of the Reformation(2017), and a president of National Theological University Council As of 2026, he serves as the president of the Thematic Research Committee in the 100th General Assembly of the Presbyterian Church of Korea, president of the Korea Culture Mission Center, and director of Agape (Somang Prison). He is the president of Korean Association of Christian Studies in 2019.

== Personal life ==
He married Jung Sook Han, piano music professor of Honam Theological University and Seminary, with whom he has one daughter, Kyung Hee (married to Jung Seo Lee), one son, Hyun Woo (married to You Ri Chae), and six grandchildren: Seo Yeon, Ji Hyun, Joon Seong, Tae Yoon, Tae Heon, and Eun Seong.

== Honors ==
He won the General Moderator of PCK Award at the Commencement Ceremony in 1981, the Hwangjo Compliment Medal of the Republic of Korea(황조근정훈장) from Jae-in Moon, the President of Korea in 2017, the Theologian of the Year 2018 Award conferred by Calvin's 500th Birthday Memorial Society in 2018, the Proud Presbyterian of the Year 2018 Award(in the Department of Scholarship) conferred by the Council of Presbyterian Churches in Korea in 2018 and Albert Nelson Marquis Lifetime Achievement Award 2019. And his name was registered in Marquis' Who's Who 2018 and Korean Who's Who 2019 of YonhapNews Agency.

== Books and co-authors ==
- Spirit and Ethics
- Religion and Ethics
- Worship and Human Behavior
- Christianity and the Future Society
- Growing Bible Trees
- Introduction to Christian Bioethics
- Green Spirituality
- Hermeneutical Approach to Christian Social Ethics Methodology
- Saving Rainbow in Mark's Gospel
- Christianity and Ecology
- Future Church and Future Theology
- The Seven Gates of God
- Be a Blessing
- Eternal life
- Church and Society
- Modern Theology and Christian Ethics
- Introduction to Christian Ethics
- Theology and Ethics of Modern Ecological Theologians
- What is the problem of passive euthanasia?
- Christian Answers to Homosexuality
- Church, Called Out to Serve the World
- Jonathan Edward's Philosophical Theology
- Introduction to Christian Social Service
- 21st Century Science and Faith

== See also ==
- Ky-Chun So
- Seung-Goo Lee
