= Elmer George Homrighausen =

Elmer George Homrighausen (April 11, 1900 – January 3, 1982) was an American theologian.

== Biography ==
Homrighausen was born in Wheatland, Iowa, and earned an A.B. (1921) from Lakeland College (Wisconsin), a B.Th. (1924) from Princeton Theological Seminary, an M.A. (1920) from Butler University, and a Th.M. (1929) from the University of Dubuque.

He was professor of Christian education at Princeton Theological Seminary from 1938 to 1954, and served as dean of the seminary from 1955 to 1964.

He retired in 1970, and the seminary established a chair of Christian social ethics named in his honor. He also served as vice moderator of the United Presbyterian Church, and on the World Council of Christian Education, Princeton Board of Education, World Council of Churches, and other bodies.

He died in Princeton, New Jersey, aged 81.

He and his wife, Ruth W. Strassburger, raised six children.
