= G. Thompson Brown =

G. Thompson "Tommy" Brown (April 30, 1921 - January 21, 2014) was the Professor Emeritus of World Christianity at Columbia Theological Seminary, a missionary, author, and the Director of the Division of International Mission for the Presbyterian Church in the United States (PCUS). He spent much of his life in Korea focusing on strengthening the Presbyterian Church there. His daughter is Mary Brown Bullock, who was President of Agnes Scott College and a foundation executive in developing exchange with China.

== Education ==
G. Thompson Brown (1921-2014) was born in Guling, (now Lushan) Jiangxi province, China. His parents, Frank A. Brown and Charlotte Thompson Brown, were both Presbyterian missionaries, so he attended school and grew up in Xuzhou, Jiangsu Province, China until he graduated high school. He then moved back to the United States and attended Davidson College, where he graduated with a BA in 1942. After a brief time in the army, he then attended Union Theological Seminary, where he earned a BD in 1949 and a Th.D. in 1963. In 1950 he also earned a Th.M. from Princeton Seminary. Later in 2012 he was awarded an honorary doctorate degree from Honam Theological Seminary, the school he helped create.

== Life ==
After Brown graduated from Davidson College, he served in World War II as a U.S. Army Signal Corps officer until the end of the war. Then after his graduation from Princeton Seminary, he served as the pastor at Adams Memorial and Linwood Presbyterian Churches in Gastonia, NC for two years. He was then appointed as a missionary for the Presbyterian Church to Korea in 1952. During his time there he worked with churches in southwest Korea. He later founded the Honam Theological Academy in Gwangju (now the Honam Theological University and Seminary), one of seven seminaries in Korea. After its establishment he worked there as Professor of New Testament in 1955 and later as president from 1960 to 1967, while still serving his role as PCUS missionary. From 1967 until 1973, Brown was Area Secretary for East Asia, and later Field Secretary for Korea while lecturing in New Testament at the Presbyterian Theological Seminary in Seoul, Korea.

In 1973, he returned to Atlanta as Director of International Missions for the Southern Presbyterian Church. He held this position until 1981, when he began teaching World Christianity at Columbia Theological Seminary, where he retired.

Brown was the first president of Chinese Connection, a Christian-centered organization that provided medical and public health services in China. One of his largest projects he help coordinate was the outfitting of two mobile surgical clinics for use in mountainous areas.

Brown was married to Mary (Mardia) Alexander Hopper for 70 years. They met while attending Pyeng Yang Foreign School, a now defunct mission school in Pyongyang, Korea.

== Works ==
- Christianity in the People's Republic of China (John Knox Press, 1983)
- Mission to Korea (and Korean Translation, Presbyterian Church of Korea, 1984)
- Presbyterians in World Mission (CTS Press, 1995)
- Earthen Vessels and Transcendent Power: American Presbyterians in China, 1837-1952 (Orbis Books, 1997)
- Face to Face: Meditations on the Life Everlasting (Geneva Press, 2001)
- How Koreans are Reconverting the West (Xlibris Corporation, 2008 and Korean Translation, 2009)
