= Lorna Taylor =

American ophthalmology CEO

- Education: Princeton Theological Seminary
- Occupation: CEO of Premier Eye Care

Lorna Taylor is the CEO of Florida based Premier Eye Care.

== Education ==
She earned her M.Div. in Social Ethics from Princeton Theological Seminary in Princeton, New Jersey.

== Career ==
Taylor launched Premier Eye Care in 1993 and was still CEO as of 2015. Premier is a managed care company that provides medical review, authorization and payment services in the field of ophthalmology. As of 2014 it had 2.7 million customers in Florida and about 300,000 people outside Florida.

== Awards and recognition ==
In 2013, she was named a Woman of Distinction by Girl Scouts of West Central Florida and received the Angie Award from Tampa Bay Business Journal. In 2013, The Tampa Bay Business Journal honored her as Business Woman of the Year.

Lorna was awarded the "Light of Sight Award" from the Lions Eye Institute for Transplant and Research in honor of her advocacy and philanthropy.
