= Ordination exams =

Ordination examinations are given by an ecclesiastical body as a way to ensure that a candidate is adequately equipped, called and prepared for ministry in that body.

In the Presbyterian Church (U.S.A.), there are five exams: Theology, Worship and Sacraments, Polity, Biblical Exegesis (undertaken in either Biblical Greek or Hebrew, with the same language for all students taking the exam at the same time.), and the Bible Content Exam.

The first three, respectively, are taken via the Internet over the course of two days. The fourth exam is given to students at the conclusion of the other three exams, and is taken home for completion. In addition, all candidates for ministry must pass a fifth ordination exam typically given the first year of seminary called the Bible Content Exam.

Exams are graded by at least two readers. Each reader assigns a grade of Satisfactory or Unsatisfactory to each essay question. Then if the student passes a majority of questions for that reader, the reader assigns a Satisfactory grade. If one reader passes a student, and a second fails that student, a third reader is then called in to make a final judgment and the use of the third reader is not visible to the student or their ordaining body.

Special considerations are made for students whose first language is not English, and the exam is regularly administered in Spanish and Korean.

It is common for students to have to take their exams several times before passing. Up to 28% of ordained ministers will have repeated at least one exam. Some, though not all, presbyteries impose a limit on the number of times their candidates may attempt an exam. Others allow for alternative formats. Still, a fair number of students do not pass all of their exams after several tries. It is not unheard of for a candidate to be dismissed from the ordination process after multiple attempts to pass the tests have failed.

In addition, Presbyterian seminarians are required to pass an examination covering the content of the Bible. Practice exams are available here .

== See also ==
- PC(USA) seminaries
