= Honam Theological University and Seminary =

Private university in Gwangju, South Korea

- 호남신학대학교
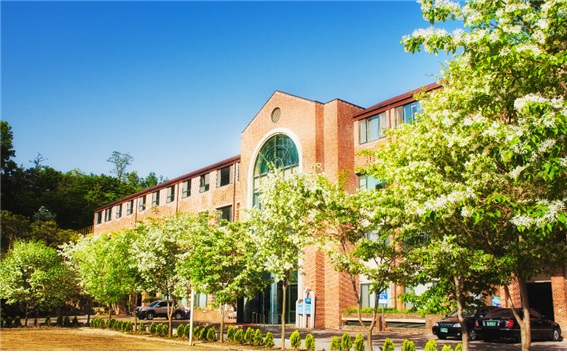
- Type: Private
- Established: 1955
- Affiliations: Presbyterian Church of Korea
- President: YoungSang Ro
- Location: Gwangju, South Korea; 35.140493°N 126.911202°E
- Website: www2.htus.ac.kr

Korean name
- Hangul: 호남신학대학교
- Hanja: 湖南神學大學校
- RR: Honam sinhak daehakgyo
- MR: Honam sinhak taehakkyo

Honam Theological University and Seminary is a private university located in Gwangju, South Korea. The university was established in the year 1955. with help from G. Thompson Brown.

In 1961, due to the severe shortage of pastors in comparison to the rapid growth of the church at the time, the institution was reorganized as Honam Theological Seminary with G.T. Brown as its first president. In 1963, it was renamed Honam Theological Seminary, and in 1971, it was approved as an educational corporation.

The following year, it was permitted to establish the Presbyterian Honam Theological Seminary, a four-year institution equivalent to a university, and admitted 40 students to the theology department. In 1976, the school moved to its current location with newly constructed buildings, and in 1980, the enrollment capacity was increased to 80 students. In 1981, an evening program was introduced.

In line with efforts to enhance the quality of pastors to meet the needs of the times, the institution continued to expand its human and material resources. In 1984, it was designated as a four-year college-level institution, and in 1987, the church music department was established. In 1989, it was reorganized as Honam Theological College, and in April 1992, it was renamed Honam Theological University. In February 1999, it was recognized as the best university in the educational field and an excellent university in the financial management field according to the university comprehensive evaluation results.

In November 1999, the university established a doctoral program in theology and a graduate school of Christian counseling. In November 2000, the library was completed.

In July 2001, a graduate school specializing in pastoral ministry was established, and in February 2002, it was selected as a comprehensive excellent university in liberal arts education evaluation. In February 2004, a lifelong education center was established, and the department of social welfare counseling was newly established.

== Current Status ==
The graduate schools include the Graduate School, Theological Seminary, Graduate School of Ministry, and Graduate School of Church Music, with over 500 students enrolled.

The university's motto is "Faith, Learning, Service," and its affiliated institutions include a library, dormitory, school newspaper, and educational broadcasting station. Research institutes affiliated with the university include the Theological Research Institute, Church Music Research Institute, Hermeneutics Research Institute, and Communication Academy.

Every May, the university holds a festival called "Galmaeljeon," and student activities are actively conducted around nine clubs. The university has sister relationships with universities such as Frescobaldi University in Italy and universities in Bolivia and the United States.

== Gallery ==
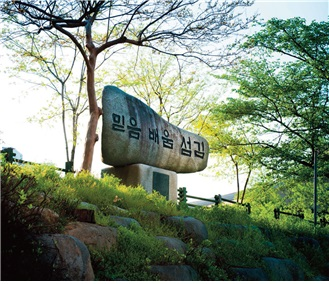

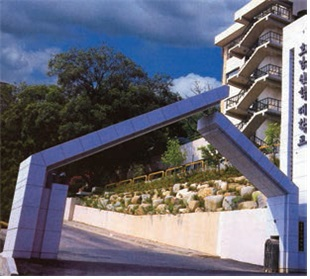

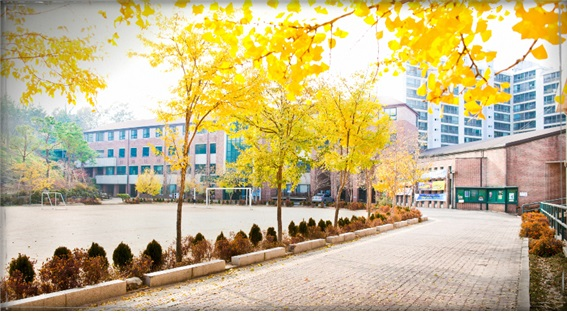

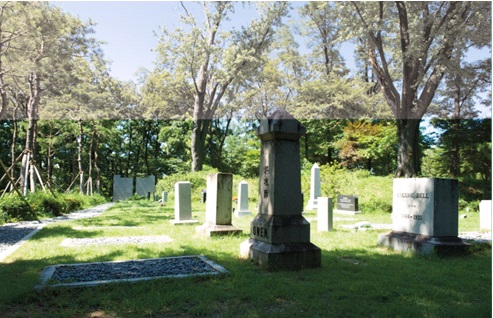

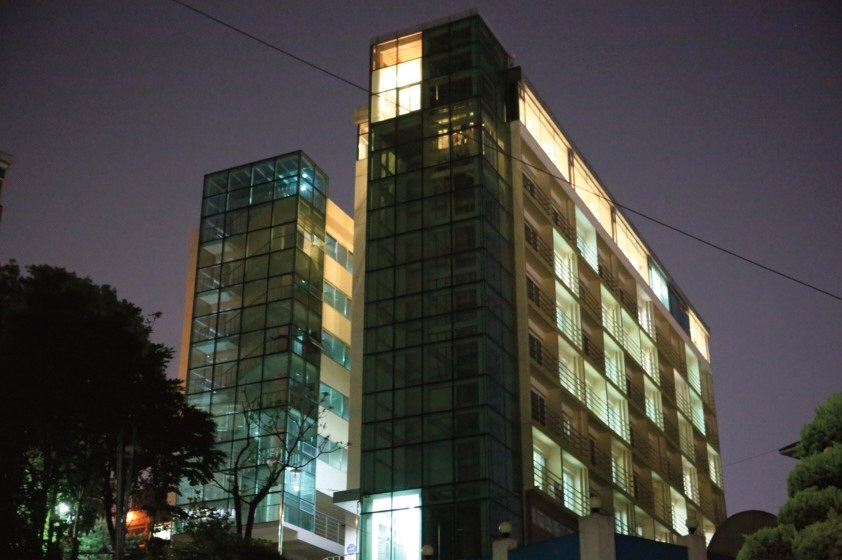

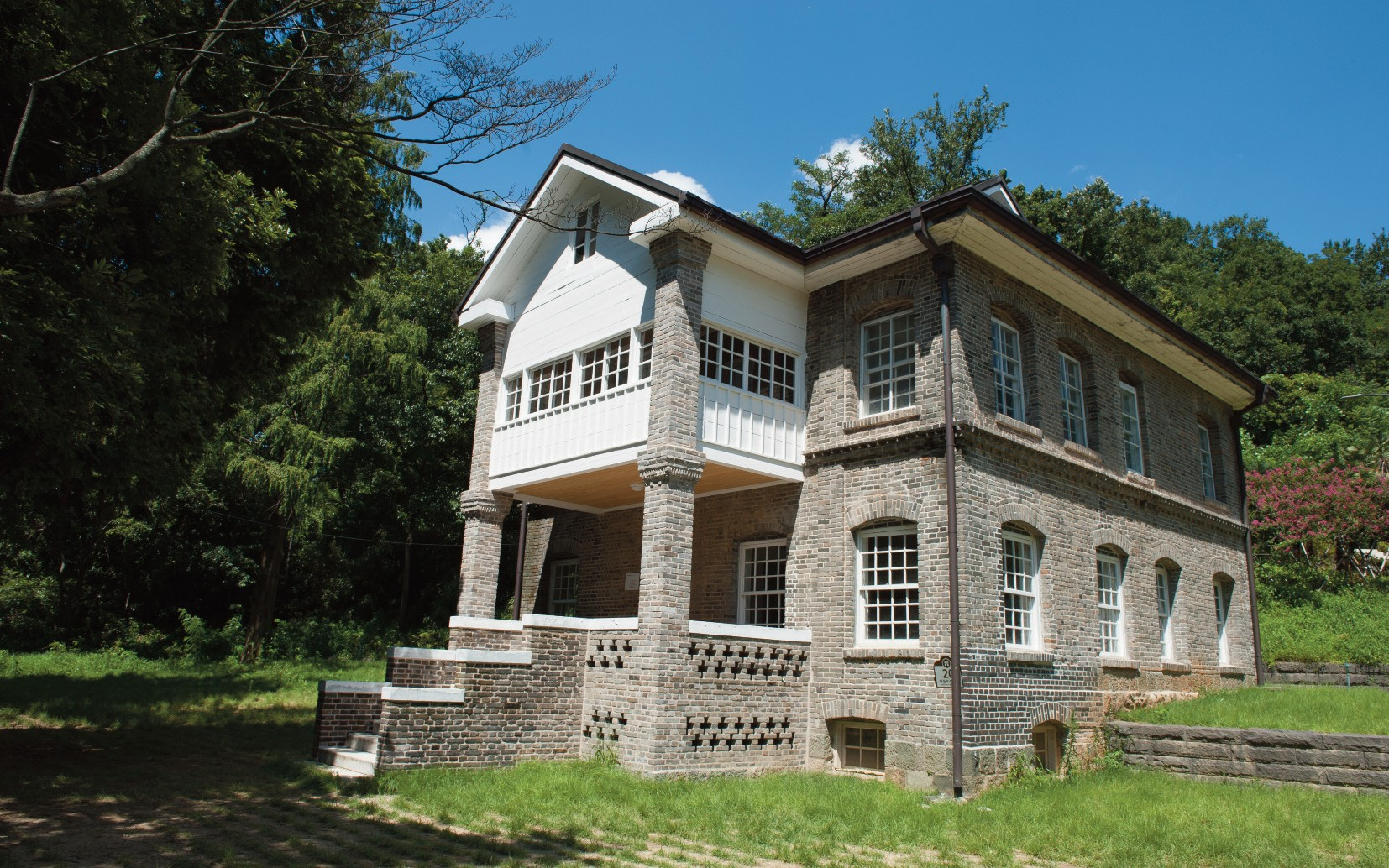
