= Graduate student journal =

Academic journal run by graduate students

A graduate student journal is an academic journal which is run by graduate students.

== Overview ==
They are involved in the production, editing and peer review processes for the journal. On the whole, graduate student journals have a poor reputation, limited funding, and training can result in poor production values and editorial practices. Despite this, some graduate student journals, such as the Harvard Educational Review, are highly regarded, and peer review can be performed to a higher standard in student-run journals than in more mainstream journals.

== Evaluation ==
Graduate student journals can be controversial, with some professors claiming that they create additional stress for students, create problems for their time management, and potentially erode academic publication standards, since students may be unable to commit enough time to the organization, review and writing process. Some critics have shown skepticism that students could provide rigorous review process associated with traditional academic journals.

Others have however pointed out that student journals provide students with unique opportunities and training not contemplated in regular activities. It is helpful for the development of communication skills, for the leadership opportunities they provide, for training students to collaborate with peers, and improving their research and writing skills. The opportunity also assists reviewers by training them to engage critically with manuscripts, a key part of academic life that is little developed in courses. Perry has also noted that graduate students may not be experts in their fields yet, but that they have ‘time, care and attention’ to dedicate to reading manuscripts, which other scholars often lack.
