= Sheli Nan =

American composer, performer, author, and teacher

Sheli Nan is an American composer, performer, author, and teacher. She is known for her chamber music, opera, requiem, and oratorio.

== Career ==
Sheli Nan's first LP, Acoustic Piano Excursions, was produced by KPFA. Nan has released 12 CDs, including her Orchestral Suite in 3 Movements: Signatures in Time and Place.

Nan composed incidental music for "Cuchulain – A Tragedy for the Heroic Age" by William Butler Yeats, performed by The Bay Theater Collective at Julia Morgan Theater. She also composed "Sarah and Hagar – The Reconciliation of the Jewish Mother and the Arab Mother."

Her opera Saga of the 21st-Century Girl was performed under the Berkeley Repertory Company at Osher Studio, and her work Last Stop Café was featured at the Berkeley Baroque Festival.

She was commissioned to compose for The Albany Consort, creating Requiem for the Ancestors – Dia de los Muertos, performed in San Francisco.
