= St. John's Presbyterian Church (San Francisco) =

Historic church in California, United States

- Saint John's Presbyterian Church
- U.S. National Register of Historic Places
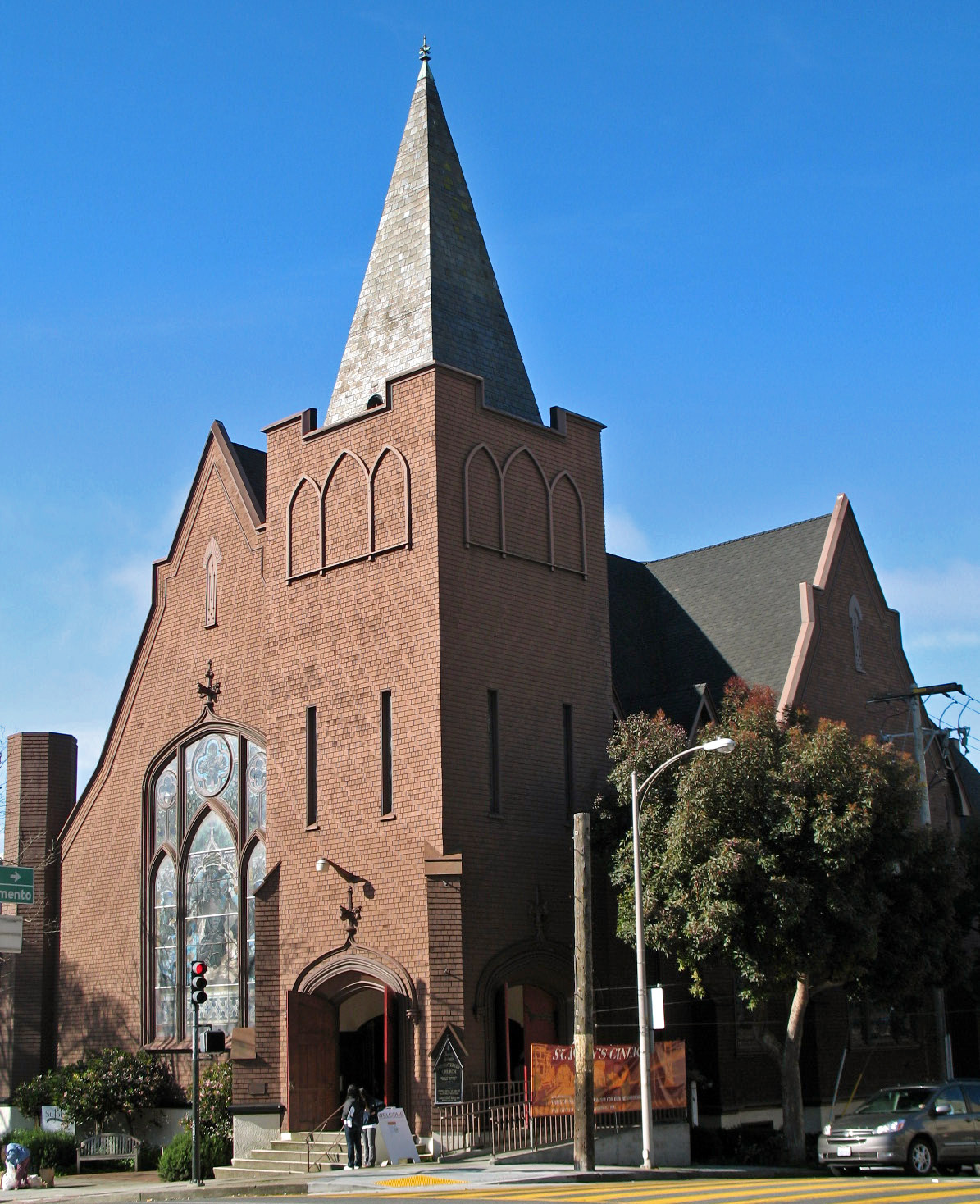

- Location within San Francisco County Location within California Location within the United States
- Location: 25 Lake St. and 201 Arguello Blvd., San Francisco, California
- Coordinates: 37°47′12″N 122°27′31″W
- Area: less than one acre
- Built: 1905
- Architects: Dodge & Dolliver
- Architectural style: Gothic Revival Shingle Style
- NRHP reference No.: 95001555
- Added to NRHP: January 22, 1996

St. John's Presbyterian Church is an open and affirming Presbyterian Church (USA) church in San Francisco at 25 Lake Street and 201 Arguello Boulevard in the Presidio Terrace neighborhood.

It was designed in a Gothic Revival Shingle Style and completed in 1905. The building was added to the National Register of Historic Places in 1996.

== History ==
St. John's was first located on Post Street near Mason at the former St. James Episcopal Church. That church was built in 1866 and then sold in 1870 to St. John's for $45,000. Dr. William Anderson Scott, the founder of San Francisco Theological Seminary, served as the first pastor from May 1870 until 1885. Membership in the church grew to 382 from 61 over this period. The church moved to the corner of California and Octavia Streets in 1888.

Membership fell after the move and the church had difficulty paying its mortgage. Calvary Presbyterian shared the church while they were building a new church. Calvary helped pay the mortgage and the two churches discussed merging. Nevertheless, St. John's moved again in 1902, this time to the present site in the Richmond district, with financial help from Arthur W. Foster.

The new site was surrounded by sand dunes until row houses were built in the neighborhood. The first service was held on Easter Sunday, April 15, 1906, three days before the great San Francisco earthquake. Damage from the quake was not repaired until a year later; in the meantime, services were held in members' homes. In the immediate aftermath of the quake, many people moved across the Bay to Berkeley, where former congregants of St. John's organized a new church, also called St. John's Presbyterian Church. Dr. George Granville Eldridge, former pastor of the San Francisco congregation, became the founding pastor of St. John's in Berkeley.

== In popular culture ==
St. John's was used as a location for the 1993 movie "So I Married an Axe Murderer" starring Mike Myers, and for the 1997 movie "Little City" starring Jon Bon Jovi.

== See also ==
- St. John's Church Website
- Gothic Revival church buildings in California
- National Register of Historic Places listings in San Francisco, California
