= Kenneth Roberts (political scientist) =

Kenneth M. Roberts
- Education: Eckerd College (BA, 1981); University of Colorado (MA, 1983); Stanford University (PhD, 1992)
- Occupation: Academic
- Writing career
- Years active: 1992-present
- Subjects: Comparative politics; Politics of The Americas

[Kenneth M. Roberts is an American political scientist who serves as the Susan August Rubinstein Professor of Government at Cornell University. He has a h-index of 49 and i10-index of 85. As of April 27, 2026, he has 13,087 citations. His research focuses on comparative and Pan-American politics.

== History ==
He graduated with a Bachelor of Arts in 1981 from Eckerd College in international relations, a Master of Arts in 1983 from the University of Colorado in political science, and a PhD in 1992 from Stanford University in political science.

According to Sarasota Institute of Lifetime Learning, "He has been a visiting scholar at the Institute for Advanced Study at Princeton, Facultad Latinoamericana de Cieciss Sociales in Chile, Universidad Carlos III-Instituto Juan March in Spain, and the Centre on Social Movement Studies in Florence. At Cornell, he has been Director of Latin American stufies and Senior Associate Dean for Social Sciences in the College of Arts and Sciences."

== Bibliography ==
- Polarization and Democracy in Latin America: Legacies of the Left Turn, co-authored with Santiago Anria. Chicago: University of Chicago Press, 2026.
- Changing Course in Latin America: Party Systems in the Neoliberal Era. New York: Cambridge University Press, 2014.
- The Resurgence of the Left in Latin America, co-edited with Steven Levitsky. Baltimore: Johns Hopkins University Press, 2011.
- The Diffusion of Social Movements, co-edited with Rebecca Given and Sadah Soule. New York: Cambridge University Press, 2010.
- Beyond Neoliberalism? Patterns, Responses, and New Directions in Latin America and the Caribbean, co-edited with John Burdick and Philip Oxhorn. New York: Palgrave-MacMillan, 2009.
- Deepening Democracy? The Modern Left and Social Movements in Chile and Peru. Stanford, Cal: Stanford University Press, 1998.
