= Susan Estes =

Susan Estes may refer to:

- Susan Estes (businesswoman)
- Susan Estes (politician)
