= Rick Ufford-Chase =

Mayor of the city of Newport, VT

Personal life
- Born: York, Pennsylvania
- Home town: York, Pennsylvania
- Spouse: yes
- Children: 3
- Education: Dallastown Area High School; Colorado College

Religious life
- Religion: Christianity
- Denomination: Presbyterian Church (USA)

Rick Ufford-Chase

Mayor of Newport, VT
- In office January 2023 – incumbent
- Preceded by: Linda Joy Sullivan

Rick Ufford-Chase, born in York, Pennsylvania, is a peace activist and long-time member of the Southside Presbyterian Church in Tucson, Arizona. He was elected Moderator of the General Assembly of the 216th General Assembly of the Presbyterian Church (USA) on June 26, 2004. Ufford-Chase was 40 years old at the time, the youngest PC (USA) moderator in recent history. Ufford-Chase was the first Presbyterian Church (USA) moderator to serve for two years. Previous moderators served one-year terms.

He is currently the mayor of the city of Newport, Vermont.

== Biography ==
Ufford-Chase is a graduate of Dallastown Area High School, he has a bachelor's degree from Colorado College and entered Princeton Theological Seminary, but says he soon discovered that his call was not to be an ordained minister, but to serve in ministry as an elder. He has received honorary degrees from Hastings College and Bloomfield College (2006), Austin College (2007), and Eden Theological Seminary (2008). He also received the Dignitas Humana Award for Human Rights work from St. John's School of Theology and Seminary, Saint John's Preparatory School (Minnesota), in Collegeville, MN (2007).

In March 2008, Ufford-Chase with his wife Kitty were named transitional co-directors of Stony Point Center, a ninety-guest room conference center of the Presbyterian Church (USA) in Stony Point, New York. During their tenure, the Ufford-Chases were co-founders of the Community of Living Traditions, a racially diverse residential community of Muslims, Jews, and Christians committed to the developing multi-faith approaches to care for the earth, religiously based conflict, and social injustice. In 2012, Stony Point Center became home to more than thirty families who were displaced by Superstorm Sandy. In 2020, Stony Point Center was forced to close temporarily due to the Covid Pandemic, and the Community of Living Traditions dispersed.

In 2021, Rick moved to northern Vermont and co-founded the Center for Jubilee Practice with Rev. Ashley DeTar Birt. The center is dedicated to accompanying religious communities as they confess and seek to repair the historic harm caused to Indigenous and African American communities in the name of Christian dominance and supremacy.

From 2021 through 2023, Rick joined the leadership team of Johnson C Smith Theological Seminary, a historically African American Seminary of the Presbyterian Church, in order to support their development of an online curriculum.

Since September, 2021, Rick has served as the Director of Newport City Downtown Development, a small, non-profit organization dedicated to reviving the economic vitality of the small city of Newport, VT.

Rick has three adult children and two grandchildren. He lives in the City of Newport but spends significant time on the land his mother grew up on in the Village of Lowell, twenty miles south of Newport.

== Activism ==
Ufford-Chase founded BorderLinks, a bi-national organization that tries to connect and educate people of faith on both sides of the United States/Mexico border. He had served BorderLinks for 17 years prior to being elected as the Presbyterian Church's moderator. He leads a Migrant Trail walk, a 120-kilometre trek, in early June through the Sonoran Desert.

Ufford-Chase also worked with the Evangelical Center for Pastoral Studies in Central America in Guatemala, and has been a co-moderator of Presbyterian Peace Fellowship. With his wife, Kitty, he has been trained to serve as a reservist with Christian Peacemaker Teams, an organization that has sent teams of "accompaniers" to Colombia, Iraq, Palestine and the United States/Mexico border region.

On December 12, 2005, he spoke at Arizona Major State Day, at the Washington National Cathedral.

In April 2006, he visited the First Presbyterian Reformed Church of Havana.

In June 2006, after the end of his term as PC (USA) moderator, Ufford-Chase accepted a call as the executive director of the Presbyterian Peace Fellowship. While there, and acting as the first full-time appointed executive director, Ufford-Chase was a founding member of both the Christian Peace Witness for Iraq, and the Olive Branch Interfaith Peace Partnership.

In March 2008, Ufford-Chase with his wife Kitty were named transitional co-directors of Stony Point Center, a conference center of the Presbyterian Church (USA) in Stony Point, New York. While assuming this position with his wife in August 2008, Ufford-Chase continues half-time as Director of the Presbyterian Peace Fellowship.

== Works ==
- Sermon “This Very Night: The Time Is Now”, Rick Ufford-Chase, Brentwood Presbyterian Church, August 8, 2004
- "Dying to get in: crisis on the Mexican border". Christian Century. Vol. 121, no. 16. August 10, 2004. Archived from the original on May 10, 2005.
- "Guest Opinion: Rick Ufford-Chase — No on Prop. 107". The Arizona Daily Star. October 30, 2006.
- "The 2007 Pace-Warren Lectures". Second Presbyterian Church, Lexington, Kentucky. Archived from the original on May 10, 2008.

Religious titles
Preceded by The Rev. Susan R. Andrews	Moderator of the 216th General Assembly of the Presbyterian Church (USA); 2004–2006	Succeeded by The Rev. Joan Gray
