= Gensel =

Gensel is a German surname. Notable people with the name include:

- Constanze Gensel (born 1969/70), German figure skater
- John Garcia Gensel (1917–1998), American Lutheran minister
- Patricia G. Gensel (born 1944), American botanist and paleobotanist
