= Freda Gardner =

American academic (1929–2020)

Freda Gardner (April 7, 1929 - May 9, 2020) was the professor emerita of Christian education at Princeton Theological Seminary, and was the Moderator of the General Assembly of the Presbyterian Church (USA) in 1999. She was elected as Moderator, the church's highest elected position, at the 211th General Assembly, on the second ballot.

Gardner was the first woman to serve as a tenured faculty member at Princeton Seminary, teaching there from 1961 until her retirement in 1992. In 1981 she was named Educator of the Year, in 1994 she was a recipient of the Women of Faith award, and in 2001 she was recognized as a Champion for Children. She had written numerous books on religion and ministry.

Religious titles
Preceded by The Rev. Douglas Oldenburg	Moderator of the 211th General Assembly of the Presbyterian Church (USA); 1999–2000	Succeeded by The Rev. Syngman Rhee
