= Linda Joy Sullivan =

American politician and member of the Vermont State House of Representatives

Member of the Vermont House of Representatives from the Bennington-Rutland district
- In office January 2017 – January 2023
- Succeeded by: Rick Ufford-Chase

Personal details
- Party: Democratic
- Children: 2
- Education: The New School (BA); Brooklyn College; New York Institute of Technology (MBA); Thomas Jefferson School of Law (JD, LLM)

Linda Joy Sullivan is an American politician who as of August 2023 was the mayor of Newport, Vermont. She was elected on August 1, 2023 in a special election after the resignation of the previous mayor, Beth Barnes.

Previously she served in the Vermont House of Representatives from 2017 to 2022. She ran for the office of Auditor General in 2020, but lost in the Democratic primary to incumbent Doug Hoffer.
