= Byron Wade =

Byron Wade is the Vice Moderator of the 218th General Assembly of the Presbyterian Church (USA).

== Biography ==
Wade received his undergraduate degree at the University of the Redlands in California. He also holds an M.A. from the Presbyterian School of Christian Education, an M.Div. from Johnson C. Smith Theological Seminary and a D.Min. from McCormick Theological Seminary. He serves the Presbyterian Church (USA) with Bruce Reyes-Chow, the Moderator.

He serves as Pastor of the Davie Street Presbyterian Church in Raleigh, North Carolina, as he has since being ordained to ministry in 1996. He is an active member of New Hope Presbytery, filling many positions within its structure and currently serving as vice moderator. On the national level, he has been part of the Black Presbyterian Caucus and on several committees relating to ministries with youth. He was an elected member of the General Assembly Council from 1993 to 1999 and currently serves on the planning team for the 2009 National Pastor's Sabbath.

== Education ==
- University of Redlands, CA, B.A.
- Presbyterian School of Christian Education, M.A.
- Johnson C. Smith Theological Seminary, M.Div.
- McCormick Theological Seminary, D.Min.

== Family ==
The Rev. Byron Wade is married to Regina Fleming Wade, a North Carolina native. They have a 22-year-old son, Andrew.
