= Calvary Presbyterian Church (San Francisco) =

Historic church in California, United States

- U.S. National Register of Historic Places
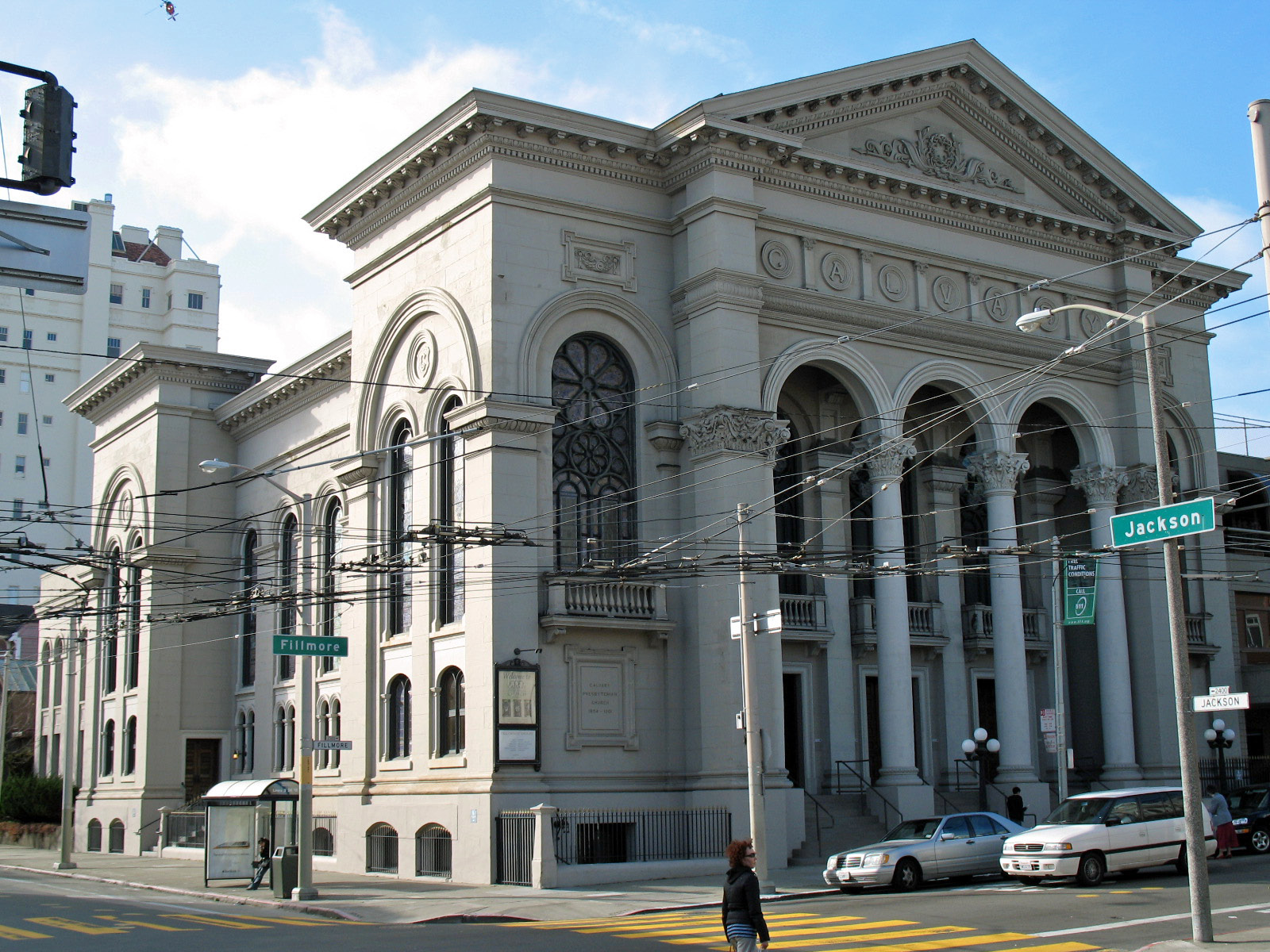

- Location within San Francisco County Location within California Location within the United States
- Location: 2501–2515 Fillmore St., San Francisco, California
- Coordinates: 37°47′34″N 122°26′1″W
- Area: 0.5 acres (0.20 ha)
- Built: 1901
- Built by: J.H. McKay
- Architect: McDougall Brothers
- Architectural style: Late 19th And 20th Century Revivals, Edwardian
- NRHP reference No.: 78000755
- Added to NRHP: May 3, 1978

Calvary Presbyterian Church is a historic Presbyterian church in San Francisco, California located in Pacific Heights at the corner of Fillmore Street and Jackson Street, and is a congregation that is part of the Presbyterian Church (USA).

The present building was built in 1901 and features Late 19th And 20th Century Revival architecture and an Edwardian style. The building was added to the National Register of Historic Places in 1978.

== History ==
The Calvary Presbyterian Church was first founded on July 23, 1854. San Francisco Mayor C. K. Garrison chaired a committee which raised the funds to build the church and hired Dr. William Anderson Scott as the first pastor. The first church was built on Bush Street, between Montgomery and Sansome Streets and dedicated on January 14, 1855. At the time it was the largest Protestant church building on the west coast.

After Bush Street became too commercial the church moved to new location on Union Square at Powell Street and Geary Street. This church was dedicated on May 16, 1869. After Union Square became too commercial the church moved to its current location at 2515 Fillmore Street. One million bricks used in the Union Square church become part of the new church, as well as all the pews, the metal balcony supports and much of the woodwork.

The first service on Fillmore St. was held on Thanksgiving Day 1902 and the building was dedicated on February 7, 1904. Twenty-six months later the 1906 earthquake destroyed much of the city but left the new building untouched. St. Luke's Episcopal Church, Old First Presbyterian Church and Temple Emanuel all held their services in the new building after the quake and a temporary courtroom was constructed in the basement for use by the Superior Court.

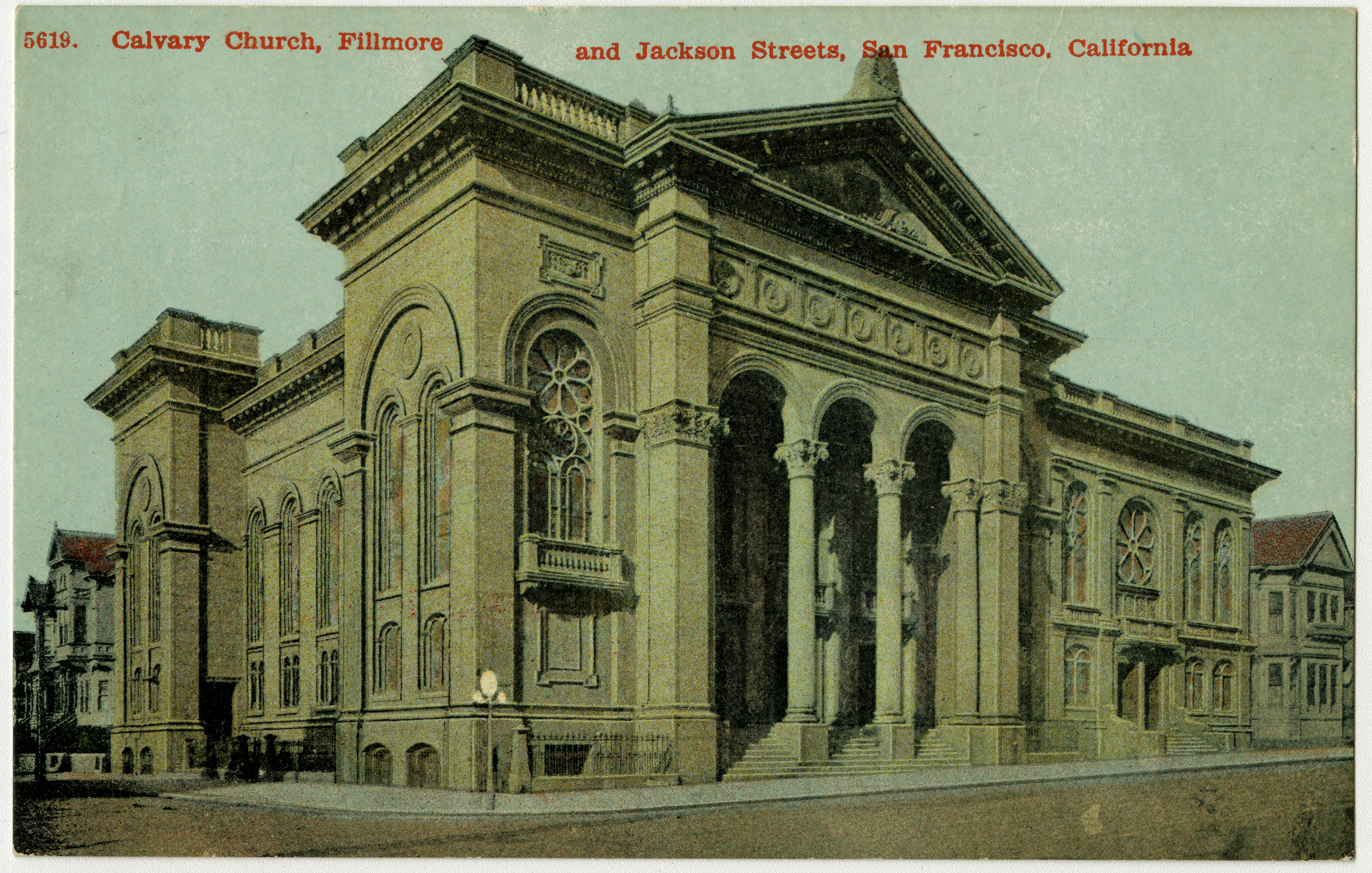
Calvary on a vintage postcard
