= Joan Gray =

Joan S. Gray was elected moderator of the Presbyterian Church (USA) at the 217th General Assembly on June 15, 2006. As moderator, she served as the presiding officer of the week-long General Assembly meeting in Birmingham, Alabama, followed by a two-year term as the ambassador-at-large for the denomination. She has also spent many years working in various churches and is currently serving as part of the faculty at Columbia Theological Seminary.

== Education ==
Gray graduated from Presbyterian College with a B.A. in 1973. She then continued her education at Columbia Theological Seminary, where she earned her M.Div. in 1976. In 1993 she attended General Theological Seminary (Episcopal), where she earned a Master of Sacred Theology in spiritual direction and received her Doctor of Ministry from Wesley Theological Seminary in 2009.

== Career ==
Gray is considered an expert on church polity and structure, and is the co-author of Presbyterian Polity for Church Officers. She previously served as moderator of the General Assembly Permanent Judicial Commission and a member of the Presbyterian Church (USA)’s Advisory Committee on the Constitution. Through five General Assemblies before and after Presbyterian reunion in 1983, she served on the Provisional Constitutional Committee. All of these are very important positions that provided Gray with insight and skill needed to be the moderator of the General Assembly.

Gray was ordained as a minister of the Word and Sacrament on March 12, 1978. Prior to serving as the moderator of the Presbyterian Church (USA), Gray served seven churches in the Atlanta area — Fellowship, Oglethorpe, Columbia, Hemphill, Good Shepherd, Smyrna, and College Park. In 1978, Joan was the first woman ordained to pastor a church in Atlanta Presbytery, PCUS. At these churches her ministries have included solo pastor, associate pastor, lead pastor/head of staff, parish associate, and interim pastor. She has served as adjunct faculty at Columbia Theological Seminary and Johnson C. Smith Theological Seminary and has taught at Princeton Theological Seminary as part of the Continuing Education Faculty.

She served as the interim dean of students and vice-president of student services at Columbia Theological Seminary.

== Publications ==
- Presbyterian Polity for Church Officers, co-authored with Joyce C. Tucker, John Knox Press, 1986 (4th edition, 2012, Geneva Press)
- Spiritual Leadership for Church Officers, Geneva Press, 2009
- The Sail Boat Church: Helping your Church Rethink Its Mission and Purpose, Geneva Press, publication date: May, 2014

Religious titles
Preceded by Elder Rick Ufford-Chase	Moderator of the 217th General Assembly of the Presbyterian Church (USA); 2006–2008	Succeeded by The Rev. Bruce Reyes-Chow
