= William Anderson Scott =

Presbyterian minister and author

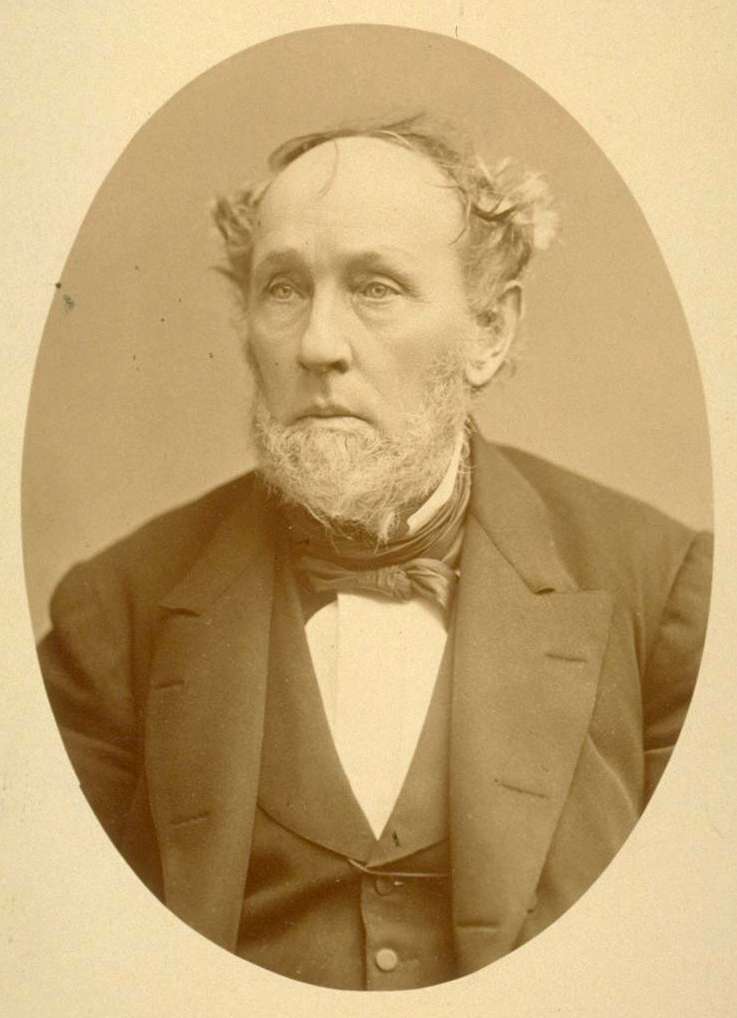
- William Anderson Scott c. 1878
- Born: January, 1813; Rock Creek, Tennessee, US
- Died: January 14, 1885; San Francisco, California, US
- Other names: W. A. Scott
- Occupations: Minister and author

William Anderson Scott (January, 1813 – January 14, 1885) was an American Presbyterian minister and author.

== Biography ==
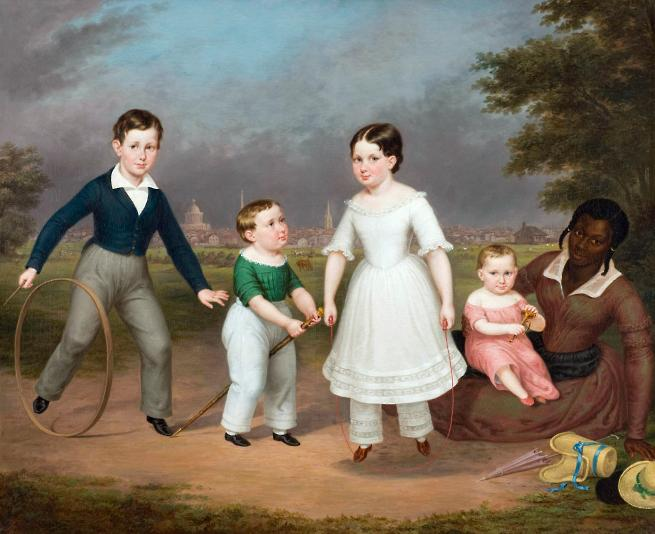
The Children of Reverend Scott painted in New Orleans

William Anderson Scott was born in Rock Creek, Tennessee, in January 1813 to Eli and Martha Scott, although sources differ as to the exact date. He graduated from Cumberland College in 1833 and attended Princeton Theological Seminary from 1833-34. He began his ministry in 1835, and his first congregation included Andrew Jackson.

Scott married Ann Nicholson on January 19, 1836, with whom he had had nine children. He commissioned a painting of his children, The Children of Reverend Scott, which is studied today as an example of the historical gender and race-based social structure and values of Scott and the times he lived in.

Scott served the church in the southern states of Tennessee, Arkansas, Alabama, and Louisiana, notably serving as pastor of First Presbyterian Church of New Orleans. He was then called to San Francisco in 1854 as the first pastor of the Calvary Presbyterian Church, but his sympathy for the institution of slavery as national tensions rose prior to the American Civil War got him into trouble with the more liberal congregation of the city, and he was forced to resign.

Scott traveled to England to serve a congregation in Birmingham in 1861, returning to America to serve a New York congregation from 1863-1870. Returning again to San Francisco, he served as the first pastor of St. John's Presbyterian Church from 1870 until his death. Scott helped found San Francisco Theological Seminary, and served on the faculty and board of directors of the institution.

He wrote a number of books including Daniel, a Model for Young Men (1854), Achan in El Dorado (1855), Trade and Letters (1856), The Giant Judge (1858), The Bible and Politics (1859), Esther, The Hebrew-Persian Queen (1859), The Church in the Army, or the Four Centurions of the Gospels (1862), Moses and the Pentateuch (1863), and The Christ of the Apostles Creed (1867). He also wrote for and edited various church periodicals.

He received honorary degrees from the University of Alabama in 1844 and the University of New York in 1872.

Scott died in San Francisco on January 14, 1885.
