= Presbyterian Peace Fellowship =

American anti-war Presbyterian organization

This logo is copyright Presbyterian Peace Fellowship and displayed here under fair use policy.

The Presbyterian Peace Fellowship (PPF) is a peacemaking organization affiliated with the Presbyterian Church (USA). Its offices are in Stony Point, NY.

Started in the early 1940s, PPF provided support for Presbyterians who were conscientious objectors during the Second World War. In the 1950s PPF worked to oppose the development of nuclear weapons. During the 1960s and the 1970s, members were doing draft resistance counseling and working to end the war in Vietnam. In the 1980s PPF was one of the founding organizations of the US-Soviet Bi-Lateral Nuclear Weapons Freeze Campaign, leading the PC(USA) to become the first major church to endorse the proposal. In the 1990s PPF's work included the Jubilee 2000 Third World Debt Relief. Throughout the last several decades, PPF members have worked toward dealing with gun violence and landmines.

In 1980, members of the Presbyterian Peace Fellowship were instrumental in encouraging the Presbyterian General Assembly to pass the document called “Peacemaking: The Believers’ Calling", which initiated the annual Peacemaking Offering in many Presbyterian churches, and established the Presbyterian Peacemaking Program of the denomination. More than twenty-five years later, PPF continues to work closely with the PPP. Often the role of the PPF is to push the denomination to new and bolder policies and actions on behalf of peace, while the PPP works within the policies of the denomination.

Since the late 1990s, the direction of the PPF has shifted to an emphasis on nonviolent direct action. Current focuses include gun violence prevention, an accompaniment program in Colombia, and advocacy and Boycott, Divestment and Sanctions for justice in Israel and Palestine.

PPF gives out the Peaceseeker Award each year since 1970 to recognized Presbyterians on the front lines of reducing war and violence. In January 2014 PPF led a delegation of 28 Presbyterians to Palestine and Israel.

In 2006 the PPF appointed Rick Ufford-Chase, former Moderator of the PC(USA), as its first full-time Executive Director. The organization is managed by a 54-member National Committee and approximately five part-time staff.

== See also ==
- List of anti-war organizations
