= Syngman Rhee (clergyman) =

Korean-American Presbyterian minister (1931–2015)

Syngman Rhee (March 25, 1931 – January 14, 2015) was a Presbyterian minister who served as the Moderator of the General Assembly of the Presbyterian Church (USA) in 2000.

== Early years ==
Syngman Rhee was born March 25, 1931, in Pyongyang, Korea (now North Korea). As the Korean War was breaking out in 1950, Rhee and a younger brother fled North Korea, leaving behind his mother and four sisters. His family was hoping they would return in two or three weeks. Rhee's father had been a Christian minister and died in prison under the communists. Syngman Rhee never saw his mother again, but was reunited with his sisters, after decades of separation, in 1978.

== Transition to the United States ==
As a refugee in South Korea, Rhee recalled:

Church World Service came with food, blankets, most of all hope in the hopeless situation for the people who were struggling. The ministry of compassion touched me very, very deeply. That's one of the reasons why I was very active in National Council of Churches and Church World Service.

Syngman Rhee joined the Republic of Korea Marine Corps and in 1953 was sent to the United States for special training at the U.S. Marine School in Quantico, Virginia. He said he struck close friendships with Christian Marine officers and continued to correspond with them after he went back to South Korea.

His friends from Quantico sponsored him as a student at Davis and Elkins College in West Virginia, where Rhee majored in English and religion. From there, he went to Louisville Presbyterian Theological Seminary, graduating in 1960. He was ordained in Louisville and a week later married Haesun Rhee, a long-time friend and medical doctor in South Korea.

== Parish and college ministry ==
Syngman Rhee's first call was to serve two small congregations near Louisville. "That was a wonderful experience for me," he said. "I found what it means to be one in Jesus Christ."

Rhee next served for 13 years as Presbyterian campus minister at the University of Louisville. He began his campus ministry in the early 1960s and recalls that Martin Luther King Jr. made several visits to the campus. "I remember marching with him and the black students in Louisville," Rhee said. "That experience taught me what it is to be engaged in the ministry of racial justice."

In 1978, Rhee left the University of Louisville and to become coordinator for Middle East Missions for what was then the United Presbyterian Church. He was with that agency for seven years.

== Academic career ==
After moving to Richmond, Virginia, in 1998 Rhee attended RKCPC (Richmond Korean Central Presbyterian Church). He served as the director of the Asian-American Study Center at Union Presbyterian Seminary in Richmond, Virginia, before he moved to Atlanta in late 2014. There he served as the distinguished visiting professor for global leadership development at Columbia Theological Seminary in Decatur Georgia. He died after a brief illness on January 14, 2015.

== Death ==
Syngman Rhee died on January 14, 2015, shortly after being diagnosed with an aggressive form of cancer. He was 83.

Religious titles
Preceded by Elder Freda Gardner	Moderator of the 212th General Assembly of the Presbyterian Church (USA); 2000–2001	Succeeded by The Rev. Dr. Jack Rogers
