= San Francisco Theological Seminary =

Presbyterian seminary in San Anselmo, California

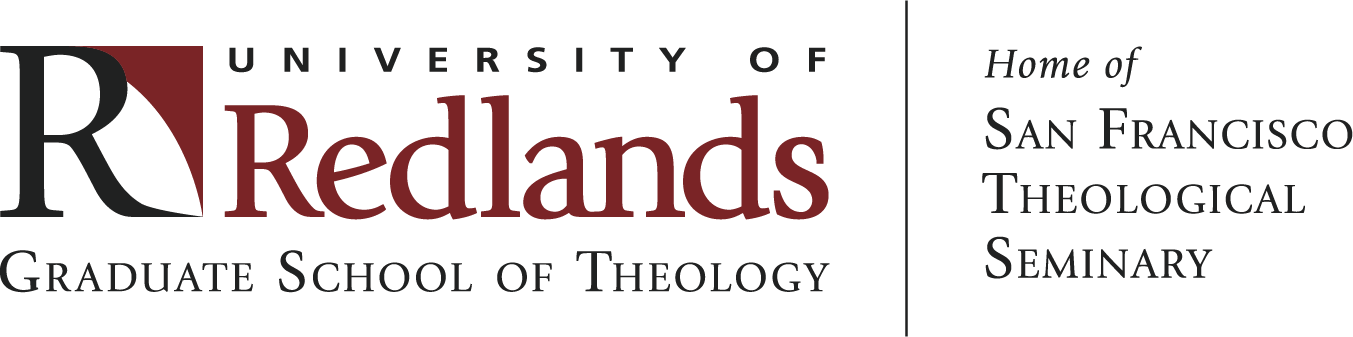
- Type: Private seminary
- Established: 1871
- Parent institution: University of Redlands
- Religious affiliation: Presbyterian Church (U.S.A.)
- Academic affiliations: University of Redlands; Graduate Theological Union; University of California, Berkeley
- Students: 41 (FTE)
- Location: San Anselmo and Berkeley, California, U.S. 37°58′11″N 122°33′56″W
- Campus: Suburban, 14 acres (5.7 ha)
- Website: www.redlands.edu/study/schools-and-centers/gst/sfts/

The San Francisco Theological Seminary (SFTS) is a seminary in San Anselmo, California with historic ties to the Presbyterian Church (U.S.A.). SFTS became embedded in a new Graduate School of Theology of the University of Redlands in 2019. It was founded by the Synod of California in 1871.

SFTS is a founding member of the Graduate Theological Union (GTU) in Berkeley, a large consortium of graduate schools and seminaries in the Bay Area. Through this membership, students have access to the Flora Lamson Hewlett Library and enjoy many opportunities to learn from and engage with religious traditions outside of the Reformed tradition. Through the Graduate Theological Union, students have access to the classes and the libraries of the University of California, Berkeley and, most recently, University of Redlands.

== History ==
San Francisco Theological Seminary

San Francisco pastor William Anderson Scott opened two Presbyterian schools in his churches in the third quarter of the 19th century, the second of which was the San Francisco Theological Seminary. In 1872, SFTS began with four professors and four students meeting for instruction at the Presbyterian City College and Calvary Presbyterian Church, located at what now is Union Square, and St. John's Presbyterian Church. Six years later, the seminary moved to its own building next to the City College building on Haight Street.

The seminary moved in 1891 to a 14-acre (57,000 m^{2}) hilltop site in Marin County about 15 miles (24 km) north of the Golden Gate Bridge. A new charter issued in 1900 gave the seminary power to grant degrees, and jurisdiction over the seminary was transferred from the synod to the General Assembly of the Presbyterian Church in 1913.

In the post World War II era under its president, Jesse Hays Baird, SFTS enjoyed unprecedented expansion, with enrollment increasing to more than 300 and new buildings rising all over the San Anselmo campus. SFTS joined in 1962 with neighboring graduate schools and academic centers in founding the Graduate Theological Union in Berkeley. The GTU developed joint M.A. and Ph.D. degrees in cooperation with the graduate school at the University of California Berkeley.

In 1990, SFTS opened its second campus in Pasadena, which was housed in the Pasadena Presbyterian Church. Due to seminary budget cuts, the board of trustees voted to close the Pasadena campus in February 2011. However, despite the announced closure, the seminary continued to consider alternative opportunities to expand their programs in Southern California.

In February 2019, SFTS announced its intention to become part of the University of Redlands, based in Southern California's Inland Empire region. The merger was complete on July 1, 2019, and SFTS was embedded within a new Graduate School of Theology that carried SFTS programs forward and expanded opportunities for its students.

In consequence of the merger, the PCUSA General Assembly's Committee on Theological Education (COTE) removed SFTS from its roster of Presbyterian Seminaries, and the Presbyterian Foundation withheld payments from a portion of SFTS endowment that it held in trust, on the grounds that the seminary no longer exists as an incorporated entity. While SFTS maintained its commitment to Presbyterian 'theological education', the PC(USA) was unconvinced. “After six years, there is no requirement of any Presbyterians on the UR Board, and after five years the proceeds from any sale of former SFTS assets may be used as determined in the discretion of that board, who are fiduciaries for the University of Redlands and not for the former SFTS. In short, COTE is concerned that the distinguished legacy of the former SFTS could disappear after five years.”. The co-moderators of the 224th General Assembly appointed a mediator, and after a year of negotiation, COTE, SFTS, and the University of Redlands agreed to a covenant "reaffirming SFTS as a Presbyterian theological seminary related to the Presbyterian Church (U.S.A.)". COTE presented the covenant to the 225th General Assembly of the PCUSA in July 2022, and the Assembly, upon COTE's recommendation, approved the covenant without controversy, treating the covenant relationship as equivalent to an institutional relationship.

== Campus ==
The SFTS campus is now known as the University of Redlands, Marin Campus, which is also home to the UR School of Business & Society.

== Academics ==
San Francisco Theological Seminary degree programs include the Master of Divinity (M.Div.), Master of Arts (MA), and Doctor of Ministry (D.Min.). The seminary also offers graduate-level diplomas and certificate programs. In conjunction with the Graduate Theological Union and the University of California Berkeley, students can also earn a Master of Arts or Doctor of Philosophy (Ph.D.). Students also have access to professional certificate programs in the University of Redlands School of Continuing Studies.

=== Academic affiliations ===
- Graduate Theological Union Berkeley: Through GTU schools and centers, SFTS students can relate to wider communities within Judaism, Islam, Buddhism, Roman Catholicism, Eastern Orthodoxy and Protestantism. SFTS students enjoy free and open cross-registration with all GTU member institutions.
- University of California Berkeley: Through Graduate Theological Union agreements, SFTS students enjoy free cross-registration for UC Berkeley courses and the use of the university's research and performing arts centers, its nearly 100 library collections and approximately 80 museum collections.
- University of Redlands: As part of the University of Redlands, SFTS students have access to a wide range of programming, including joint degrees through the university's School of Business and School of Education.

== Notable alumni ==
- John Norman Maclean, 1893 graduate and pastor of Presbyterian churches in Vacaville (1893–1897), Bozeman, Montana (1897–1902), Clarinda, Iowa (1902–1909), and Missoula, Montana (1909–1925). Maclean was father of renown author, Norman Maclean, whose novella, A River Runs Through It, achieved both critical and commercial success. The autobiographical novel, later made into film in 1992, features prominently Maclean.
- Yvette Flunder, D.Min, San Francisco Theological Seminary; Founder the City of Refugee and Chair of the San Francisco Inter-religious Coalition on AIDS.
- The Rev. Bruce Reyes-Chow, M.Div, San Francisco Theological Seminary; Moderator of the 218th General Assembly of the Presbyterian Church (USA)

== Notable faculty members ==
- David Noel Freedman Gray Professor of Old Testament Exegesis at San Francisco Theological Seminary (1961–1964); Endowed Chair in Hebrew Biblical Studies at the University of California, San Diego (1986–2008).
- David Alexander Professor of Old Testament and Theology at San Francisco Theological Seminary, and President Emeritus of Pomona College
- James Muilenburg Gray Professor of Hebrew Exegesis and Old Testament (1963–1972).
- John Dillenberger Dean of the Faculty at San Francisco Theological Seminary; Professor Emeritus, Graduate Theological Union Berkeley; Chair of the Program in History and Philosophy at Harvard University
- Philip L. Wickeri Adviser to the Archbishop of Hong Kong for theological and historical studies and Professor of Church History at Hong Kong Sheng Kung Hui Ming Hua Theological College
