= Douglas Oldenburg =

American pastor (1935–2020)

Douglas W. Oldenburg (February 22, 1935 to July 21, 2020) was a Christian pastor and President Emeritus at Columbia Theological Seminary in the US. He served as the moderator of the 210th General Assembly of the Presbyterian Church (USA) in 1998.

== Early life and education ==
Douglas Oldenburg was born on February 22, 1935, in Muskegon, Michigan and grew up in Signal Mountain, Tennessee and Charlotte, North Carolina. His parents were Frederika Nordoff and Theodore Oldenburg; his father had immigrated from Amsterdam as a small child.

He attended college at Davidson College, where he earned a B.S. in 1956. In 1960, he continued to Union Theological Seminary in Virginia where he received a B.D. in 1960, and went on to study at Yale Divinity School where he earned his S.T.M. in 1961.

He was also awarded four honorary Doctorate of Divinity degrees (Rhodes College, Budapest Reformed Theological Academy, St. Andrews Presbyterian College, and Davis and Elkins College) and two honorary Doctor of Humane Letters (Hastings College and Davidson College).

== Career ==
During his time at Davidson College, he was an officer in the ROTC, a Lieutenant in the US Army and served as part of the Chaplaincy as a Captain in the Army Reserve.

Following his graduation from Union Theological Seminary in Virginia, he served as pastor at Covenant Presbyterian Church in Lynchburg, Virginia. After seven years he served as a pastor at Davis Memorial Church in Elkins, West Virginia. He then served as pastor in the city where he grew up, Charlotte, North Carolina.

Oldenburg also served on local committees in several communities. In Lynchburg, Virginia he helped to organize the Kum Ba Ya House ministry for disadvantaged children. In Elkins, West Virginia he led a successful vote on a bond levy to raise teacher salaries. In Charlotte, North Carolina he was on the Board of United Community Services and was a co-founder and board member of Crisis Assistance Ministry. He received the Martin Luther King, Jr. award and The Order of the Hornet of Mecklenburg County. In Atlanta, Georgia he served on the board of Global Health Action and the University Center of Georgia and worked to co-ordinate relationships between the presidents of all the seminaries of the Presbyterian Church (USA).

After serving a total of 26 years as pastor, he then became the seventh president of Columbia Theological Seminary in 1987, which he held until his retirement in 2000.

He served many institutions and churches including the Presbyterian Church (USA). He served on a variety of committees for the General Assembly of the Presbyterian Church (USA) and became the moderator of the 210th General Assembly in 1998. His platform largely centered on theological education and social justice. He called for support of the ordination of educators and for unity among the nation's church related colleges and universities. As Moderator, he called for every congregation and presbytery to engage in a program of study about what Presbyterians believe about the Bible and how they read the Bible.

For many years, he served on the board of Focused Community Strategies (FCS Urban Ministries) and the Protestant Radio and Television Center (now called Day1).

In 2018, Oldenburg was recognized as a distinguished leader in theological education by the Committee on Theological Education and the Theological Education Fund at the General Assembly for the Presbyterian Church (USA) for his commitment and contribution to theological education and the Presbyterian Church.

== Publications ==
He contributed several articles to different publications. These include:

- The Anguish of the Earth, Journal for Preachers, 1991.
- Reflections of a Pastor/President, Theological Education Leadership, Volume XXXII, Supplement III, 1996.
- The Growing Economic Disparities in the United States, Journal for Preachers, 1997.

== Personal life ==
Oldenburg was married to Claudia and they had three sons.

Religious titles
Preceded by Elder Patricia G. Brown	Moderator of the 211th General Assembly of the Presbyterian Church (USA); 1999–2000	Succeeded by Elder Freda Gardner
