= Cynthia Bolbach =

Moderator of the General Assembly of the Presbyterian Church

Cynthia Bolbach (December 27, 1947 – December 12, 2012) was the Moderator of the 219th General Assembly of the Presbyterian Church (U.S.A.). Bolbach was elected as Moderator on July 3, 2010, from a field of six candidates. Of the candidates, Bolbach was the only Elder and the only one to express unqualified support for same-sex marriage. She succeeded Rev. Bruce Reyes-Chow and ended her term as moderator upon election of her successor, Rev. Neal D. Presa, at the 220th General Assembly on June 30, 2012. She received 30 percent of the vote on the first ballot and, after three additional ballots, clinched the election with 53 percent of the vote.

In addition to her duties as Moderator, Bolbach was a lawyer and legal publishing company executive in Washington, D.C. She was also one of the co-moderators of the new Form of Government (the Constitution) Task Force of the Presbyterian Church (U.S.A.). Bolbach died peacefully on December 12, 2012, after a year-long battle with cancer.

Religious titles
Preceded by The Rev. Bruce Reyes-Chow	Moderator of the 219th General Assembly of the Presbyterian Church (USA); 2010	Succeeded by The Rev. Neal Presa
