= John Garcia Gensel =

Creator of Jazz ministry in New York City

The Reverend John Garcia Gensel
- Gensel (standing) with Duke Ellington

Personal details
- Born: Juan Garcia Valez; February 16, 1917 Manatí, Puerto Rico
- Died: February 6, 1998 (aged 80) Muncy, Pennsylvania, U.S.
- Buried: Muncy, Pennsylvania
- Denomination: Lutheran
- Spouse: Audrey Gensel
- Children: John Arthur Gensel, James Garcia Gensel, Carol Diane Beckwith-Cohen
- Occupation: Jazz minister
- Education: Doctor of Humane Letters
- Alma mater: Susquehanna University

John Garcia Gensel (February 16, 1917- February 6, 1998) was a Lutheran minister who ministered to the jazz community, and the creator of jazz ministry in New York City.

== Early life ==
John Garcia Gensel was born in Manatí, Puerto Rico in 1917 and baptized as Catholic by his birth parents. At the age of six he was sent alone to the mainland, where he was raised in Catawissa, Pennsylvania, by his aunt Fina and her husband Charles Gensel, who legally adopted him.

John Gensel earned his Bachelor of Divinity from the Lutheran Theological Seminary at Gettysburg in 1943.

== Personal life ==
After being ordained into the ministry, he met Audrey Moyer Dodge while preaching at a church in Washington, D.C.; they married in 1943. In 1948, the couple moved to Ohio where they had their first child, a girl, and later had two sons.

== Ministry ==
Gensel served as a United States Navy chaplain in Guam during World War II. In the early 1950s, Gensel became a traveling minister providing services from a trailer called "the chapel of the good shepherd" to the Portsmouth Gaseous Diffusion Plant near Piketon, Ohio, where he was called "The Atomic Pastor". Life magazine published an article about his ministry in August 1954. In 1956, Gensel moved to Harlem, New York City, and became a pastor to the congregation at Advent Lutheran Church.

In 1932, Gensel heard Duke Ellington play at Berwick, Pennsylvania and fell in love with jazz. After moving to New York in 1956, Gensel began frequenting local jazz clubs; the jazz community had often worked late hours on Saturday nights, making it difficult to attend church on Sunday mornings; Gensel wanted to create a service which would allow their participation, and created jazz vespers. In 1965, Gensel was named full-time minister to the jazz Community; initially jazz vespers were held at various locations including Central Synagogue.

In 1968, jazz ministry had become fully established in Saint Peter's Lutheran Church on Lexington Avenue in New York City. Jazz musicians including Duke Ellington, Thelonious Monk, John Coltrane, Dizzy Gillespie, Miles Davis, Charles Mingus, and Billy Strayhorn attended and played regularly at jazz vespers.

In 1975, Documentary Educational Resources published a movie about Gensel which was filmed over the course of 5 years; the documentary records Duke Ellington's last concert and funeral. At Saint Peter's, Gensel also founded "All Nite Soul", a 12-hour jazz jam session held annually in October, starting at 5pm and continuing through the night. "All Nite Soul" continues to be held in Saint Peter's church in New York. Since the establishment of jazz vespers, hundreds of memorial services were held by Gensel, including those held in the memory of musicians such as Ellington, Gillespie, and John Coltrane.

Gensel was a supporter of civil rights, and following the assassination of Martin Luther King Jr., he held a tribute concert in his honor at Carnegie Hall to benefit Tougaloo College, an African-American institute in Mississippi. On April 29, 1986, Ellington appeared on a USPS stamp, the stamp issue was celebrated on his birthday with Gensel at Saint Peter's. In 1993, Gensel received an honorary Doctor of Humane Letters from Wagner College in Staten Island, New York. In 1994, after serving the jazz community for over 30 years, Gensel retired from his congregation at Saint Peter's and Rev. Dale Lind took his place. Gensel then moved to Exchange County, Pennsylvania, where he continued to hold services at local Lutheran churches.

== Tributes ==
In 1976, jazz musicians including Thelonious Monk gathered at Radio City Music Hall to play jazz and pay tribute to Gensel, the minister to the Jazz community. Duke Ellington composed a jazz piece for Gensel named "The Shepherd (Who Watches Over The Night Flock)"; the piece is part of Duke Ellington's Sacred Concerts.

In 1993, drummer Max Roach learned that Gensel would be celebrating his 50th wedding anniversary with Audrey Gensel as well as 50 years to his ordination on the same week, and held a celebratory concert for Gensel with the Max Roach Quartet, the Uptown String Quartet and the John Motley Singers. In 1994, a tribute concert honoring Gensel's life achievements was held in Carnegie Hall. The concert was hosted by Bill Cosby and many jazz musicians played in his honor. On September 12, 1999, Saint Peter’s Jazz Vespers introduced a new African-American worship book in the spirit of Gensel. In 2000, Stony Point Center established the "John Garcia Gensel Award for Integrating Faith and the Arts"; the first award was given that year to artist Dave Brubeck.

== Death ==
Ten days before his 80th birthday, Gensel suffered a stroke and subsequent head trauma. He spent the last three months of his life in the hospital, where he passed with his wife at his bedside. He was cremated and his ashes were scattered by his family.
