= Stony Point Center =

Coordinates: 41°14′1.1″N 73°59′42.6″W

Presbyterian Peace Fellowship is affiliated with the Presbyterian Church (USA). Display of this logo is governed by fair use policy.

Stony Point Center is one of three conference centers of the Presbyterian Church (USA). The other two conference and retreat centers are Ghost Ranch and Montreat. Stony Point Center welcomes people of all faiths and nations to discern, discover, learn, and lead.

Stony Point Center is located on 32 acres (13 ha) in the Hudson River Valley in the town of Stony Point, New York, 30 miles (48 km) north of Manhattan. The facility began about 150 years ago as a ministry of hospitality shaped by four daughters of a Presbyterian minister.

In a given year, the center with its 180-bed campus welcomes a wide variety of groups who come to hold their own programs/retreats. Stony Point Center sponsors programming focused on nonviolence, peace and justice, environment, spiritual practices, and church issues. Since 2009, it has been the spiritual home of the Community of Living Traditions.

Stony Point Center is a Ministry of the Presbyterian Church (USA).

In 2000, Stony Point Center established the "John Garcia Gensel Award for Integrating Faith and the Arts"; the first award was given that year to Dave Brubeck.
