= Susan Estes (businesswoman) =

American businesswoman

- Born: 1959 (age 66–67)
- Education: University of Redlands
- Known for: CEO, OpenDoor Securities (first woman-owned bond trading business in U.S.)
- Board member of: Treasury Borrowing Advisory Committee (TBAC); AkinovA
- Awards: "Excellence in Treasury Trading Award", 2019; Honorary Doctorate, University of Redlands

Susan M. Estes (born 1959) is an American business executive and CEO of OpenDoor Securities, a firm that primarily traded in United States Treasury securities. Along with Brian Meehan, she co-founded the company in 2013, becoming the first woman to own and operate a bond trading business, an historically male-dominated industry. The company provided anonymous electronic Treasury trading. OpenDoors Securities ceased operations on January 13, 2021.

== Background ==
Estes grew up in Las Vegas, Nevada. She studied at the University of Redlands in California, earning a bachelor's degree. In 1985, she joined Morgan Stanley as a junior trader, specializing in U.S. Treasury and global bond trading. In 1999, she was promoted at age 40 to managing director of Morgan Stanley's government bond trading group, overcoming sexism in the process. According to The Wall Street Journal, her group represented approximately 5% of the firm's revenue at the time.

In 2002, Estes left Morgan Stanley to became head of North America Securities for Deutsche Bank in New York. A year later, she relocated to Los Angeles to be managing director of Countrywide Securities Corporation. Estes later explained in an interview: “Back then, the Treasury market was more volatile, moving 50 basis points at the time. Countrywide was the largest mortgage originator, and they hired me to build a domestic dealership, which was the first new dealer in more than 50 years".

== Founding of OpenDoor Securities ==
In August 2013, Estes and Brian Meehan founded OpenDoor Securities, becoming the first woman to own and manage a bond trading firm. The company markets its integrated buy-side into an anonymous platform that enhances the sourcing and creation of liquidity, employing various trading methods and traditional intermediaries for U.S. Treasuries. Headquartered in Jersey City, New Jersey, the company's clients include pension and hedge funds, primary dealers, and trading firms. The overall value of the U.S. Treasury market exceeds $17 trillion as of 2026.

By 2015, the trend in bond trading was moving away from the big investment banks or primary dealers, such as J.P. Morgan Chase, towards mutual funds and electronic-trading specialists, such as OpenDoor. In November of that year, Estes attended a conference at the Federal Reserve in New York City, where the changing market for Treasuries was discussed. In contrast to past such conferences where the primary dealers were predominant, Estes said following the 2015 meeting, "The dynamics are shifting, primary dealers are being pushed out".

In 2019, the industry faced the challenge of a $40 billion reduction in bank funding for Treasuries trading. Estes told Bloomberg News that whereas she could readily facilitate a $4 billion spread for trades in U.S. Treasuries while with Deutsche Bank in 2002, the investment banks were much less willing to take on risks of that magnitude in 2019. To get the same rate, "clients today could only pull off $250 million", she said. By 2020, trading levels had dropped in bonds and affected U.S. Treasuries to such an extent that Estes was quoted by The Wall Street Journal as calling the situation "chaos". To address the industry-wide problem of persistent illiquidity with U.S. Treasuries trading, Estes' company developed a new approach in 2020, going beyond session-based transactions for "off-the-run Treasuries" (OFTRs) to an "all-to-all" continuous order book for the government bond market. Such off-the-run Treasuries (OFTRs) constitute 32% of daily trading volume in U.S. Treasuries. OpenDoors Securities ceased operations on January 13, 2021.

Estes has served on the Treasury Borrowing Advisory Committee (TBAC), the first woman to do so, under U.S. Treasury Secretaries Henry Paulson and John W. Snow, when the TBAC addressed market issues with the Federal Reserve under Chairmen Alan Greenspan and Ben Bernanke.

== Awards ==
Estes won the "Excellence in Treasury Trading Award" in 2019, one of the Women in Finance Awards bestowed by Markets Media. Commenting on the lack of women in the American finance sector, Estes said, "The lack of gender diversity in the finance and technology workforce is not a secret. Women that I know who have excelled in this predominantly male environment come from very diverse backgrounds but are bound together by one common element: They each love what they do".

She was also awarded an honorary doctorate by her alma mater, the University of Redlands.
