= Philip Oxhorn =

American academic

Philip Oxhorn (born January 5, 1958) is a professor in international development and societal issues and a university executive. He is the founding director of the Institute for the Study of International Development at McGill University in Montreal, Quebec, where he teaches political science and edits the Latin American Research Review. In 2016, Oxhorn was appointed to a five-year term as McGill University's Associate Provost of International University Affairs.

Oxhorn received his Bachelor's in Political Science from the University of Redlands in his home state of California before continuing to the University of Canterbury for his Master's work, for which he was awarded first-class honors. Upon his completion of his Masters, he matriculated to Harvard University for his PhD.

In the 1980s, he wrote his dissertation on the Chilean civilian uprisings against dictator Augusto Pinochet. He has published over 75 articles, chapter selections, and books, including What Kind of Democracy? What Kind of Market? Latin America in the Age of Neoliberalism.

In 2012, he was interviewed regarding the similarities and difference of the 2012 Quebec student protests over tuition fees to protests in Chile the previous year. The Department of Foreign Affairs and International Trade has interviewed him about Canada-Latin America trade relations.

Also, in 2012, he supported the Canadian International Development Agency for its public-private partnerships with mining companies to foster sustainable development.
