= List of moderators of the General Assembly of the Presbyterian Church (USA) =

The office of the Moderator of the General Assembly is the highest elected position in the Presbyterian Church (USA). The Moderator is responsible for presiding over the meeting of the General Assembly, which was held annually until 2004, and on alternate years since. After the meeting, which lasts for about a week, the Moderator serves as an ambassador of the denomination throughout the remainder of the term. After completing the term, most former Moderators take on the role of a church statesman or stateswoman.

The chart below shows the Moderators and Vice Moderators, and the place of meetings, since the United Presbyterian Church in the United States of America and the Presbyterian Church in the United States merged to form the present day Presbyterian Church (USA).

== Moderators and vice moderators of Presbyterian Church (USA) General Assemblies ==
Number	Year	Place of Meeting	Moderator(s)	Vice Moderator
195th GA	1983	Atlanta, Georgia	The Rev. Randolph Taylor	The Rev. Dr. Joan SalmonCampbell
196th GA	1984	Phoenix, Arizona	The Rev. Harriet Nelson	none
197th GA	1985	Indianapolis, Indiana	Elder William H. Wilson	none
198th GA	1986	Minneapolis, Minnesota	The Rev. Benjamin Weir	none
199th GA	1987	Biloxi, Mississippi	Elder Isabel W. Rogers	none
200th GA	1988	St. Louis, Missouri	The Rev. C. Kenneth Hall	Elder Ruth Montoya
201st GA	1989	Philadelphia, Pennsylvania	The Rev. Dr. Joan SalmonCampbell	Rev. Herb Meza
202nd GA	1990	Salt Lake City, Utah	Elder Price H. Gwynn, III	The Rev. Sharon Johnson
203rd GA	1991	Baltimore, Maryland	The Rev. Dr. Herbert D. Valentine	none
204th GA	1992	Milwaukee, Wisconsin	The Rev. John Fife	none
205th GA	1993	Orlando, Florida	The Rev. David Dobler	none
206th GA	1994	Wichita, Kansas	The Rev. Robert Bohl	none
207th GA	1995	Cincinnati, Ohio	Elder Marj Carpenter	The Rev. William F. Henning
208th GA	1996	Albuquerque, New Mexico	The Rev. John M. Buchanan	Elder Gay Mothershed
209th GA	1997	Syracuse, New York	Elder Patricia G. Brown	Elder D. Eugene (Gene) Sibery
210th GA	1998	Charlotte, North Carolina	The Rev. Douglas Oldenburg*	The Rev. James E. Mead
211th GA	1999	Fort Worth, Texas	Elder Freda Gardner	The Rev. Floyd Rhodes
212th GA	2000	Long Beach, California	The Rev. Syngman Rhee	Elder Rebecca McElroy
213th GA	2001	Louisville, Kentucky	The Rev. Dr. Jack Rogers	The Rev. Janet Arbesman
214th GA	2002	Columbus, Ohio	The Rev. Fahed Abu-Akel	Elder Ann Beran Jones
215th GA	2003	Denver, Colorado	The Rev. Dr. Susan R. Andrews	Elder Charles Easley
216th GA	2004	Richmond, Virginia	Elder Rick Ufford-Chase	The Rev. Jean Marie Peacock
217th GA	2006	Birmingham, Alabama	The Rev. Joan Gray	Elder Robert Wilson
218th GA	2008	San Jose, California	The Rev. Bruce Reyes-Chow	The Rev. Byron Wade
219th GA	2010	Minneapolis, Minnesota	Elder Cynthia Bolbach	The Rev. Landon Whitsitt
220th GA	2012	Pittsburgh, Pennsylvania	The Rev. Dr. Neal Presa	The Rev. Tara Spuhler McCabe, resigned and replaced by The Rev. Dr. Tom Trinidad
221st GA	2014	Detroit, Michigan	Elder Heath Rada	The Rev. Larissa Kwong Abazia
222nd GA	2016	Portland, Oregon	The Rev. Denise Anderson & The Rev. Jan Edmiston	
223rd GA	2018	St. Louis, Missouri	Elder Vilmarie Cintrón-Olivieri & The Rev. Cindy Kohlmann	
224th GA	2020	Baltimore, Maryland (virtual via Zoom)	Elder Elona Street-Stewart & The Rev. Gregory J. Bentley	
225th GA	2022	Louisville, Kentucky (hybrid virtual)	The Reverend Ruth F. Santana-Grace and The Reverend Shavon Starling-Louis	
226th GA	2024	Salt Lake City, Utah	The Rev. CeCe Armstong and The Rev. Tony Larson	
227th GA	2026	Milwaukee, Wisconsin	The Rev. Marta Pumroy-Cordero and the Rev. Dr. Kristopher D. Schondelmeyer	

== See also ==
- List of moderators of the General Assembly of the Presbyterian Church in the United States of America
