= Bruce Reyes-Chow =

American writer and minister

Bruce Reyes-Chow is a teaching elder (minister) of the Presbyterian Church (USA).

Reyes-Chow received his BA in Asian American Studies, Sociology and Religion from San Francisco State University in 1990 and received his Masters of Divinity in 1995 from San Francisco Theological Seminary. He was the pastor of Covenant Presbyterian Church in San Francisco from 1995 to 1999 and from 2000 to 2011 he served as the founding pastor of Mission Bay Community Church in the SOMA District San Francisco, California, described as a new kind of start-up. In 2011 he was given an honorary Doctor of Divinity degree from Austin College and that same year was named the 2011 San Francisco Theological Seminary Distinguished Alumnus.

He is currently a freelance writer, speaker, coach, podcaster, and pastor. He has been a Senior Consultant and Coach with Convergence, a non-profit, Atlanta-based church development organization. Since he was ordained to in the Presbyterian Church (USA) in 1995 he has pastor served as churches all in California: in San Francisco, Daly City, Portola Valley, San Jose, Azusa, and Palo Alto. He formerly blogged for the religion, parenting, and technology sections of The Huffington Post (2011–2015), the progressive Christians section for Patheos (2011–2014) and the City Brights on SFGate (2009–2012), the online publication for the San Francisco Chronicle.

Reyes-Chow was elected Moderator of the 218th General Assembly of the Presbyterian Church. He was elected on June 21, 2008, from a field of four candidates, receiving 48 percent of the vote on the first ballot and 55 percent of the vote on the second ballot. He was at the youngest Moderator ever elected at 39 years old, and considered to be a representative of the liberal parts of the church, while some on the conservative church questioned, "Has the General Assembly put the future of the Presbyterian Church (USA) at greater risk by electing Reyes-Chow as moderator for two years?" He has been characterized as a radical centrist thinker in USA Today. In 2025 he was one of the preachers at the 2025 Presbyterian Youth Triennium, the largest youth gathering of the Presbyterian Church (USA).

He ended his time as Moderator on July 3, 2010, when his successor, Elder Cynthia Bolbach was elected at the 219th General Assembly.

Reyes-Chow is a blogger and has a large social networking presence. He believes blogging is a spiritual practice and that technology is essential to a young church. He has been interview many times on the nature of social media and liturgical seasons, the use of ChatGPT and AI in spirituality as well as the use of racial imagery in worship. In 2020 he was an early adopter of hybrid worship and was interviewed on how to address sorrow during the first Christmas of the pandemic.

In 2018 Reyes-Chow, a vocal supporter of immigrant and refugee rights, along with 30+ other faith leaders, was arrested at the US Mexico Border as part of an action by the American Friends Service Committee's protest against the militarization of the board and the treatment of refugees. In 2025 he was interviewed about churches taking risks to protect immigrant neighbors in response to ICE activities in US cities.

In 2013 he was part of the controversial Council of "The New New Testament" that published a revised version of the New Testament that added writings previous deemed unworthy of inclusion and in 2022 a chapter from his book, "In Defense of Kindness" was the center of a controversy about a Chicago congregation only reading writers of color during lent.

In 2010 Reyes-Chow was named to the NUMMI Blue Ribbon Commission by CA State Treasurer, Bill Lockyer tasked with convincing the Toyota Motor Corporation not to close their manufacturing plant in Fremont, CA.

== Works ==
- Everything Good about God is True: Choosing Faith (Broadleaf Books, 2024)
- In Defense of Kindness: Why It Matters, How It Changes Our Lives, and How It Can Save the World (Chalice Press, 2021)
- Rule #2: Don't Be an Asshat: An Official Handbook for Raising Parents and Children (Bacosa Books, 2016)
- 40 Days, 40 Prayers, 40 Words: Lenten Reflections for Everyday Life (Westminster John Knox Press, 2015)
- But I Don't See You as Asian: Curating Conversations about Race (Kickstarted, Self-Published, 2013)
- The Definitive-ish Guide for Using Social Media in the Church (Shook Foil Books, 2012)
- Insights from the Underside: An Intergenerational Conversation of Ministers (Broad Mind Press, 2008) Contributing author

Religious titles
Preceded by The Rev. Joan Gray	Moderator of the 218th General Assembly of the Presbyterian Church (USA); 2008–2010	Succeeded by Elder Cynthia Bolbach
