= St. John's Presbyterian Church (Berkeley, California) =

Historic church in California, United States

- U.S. National Register of Historic Places
- Berkeley Landmark
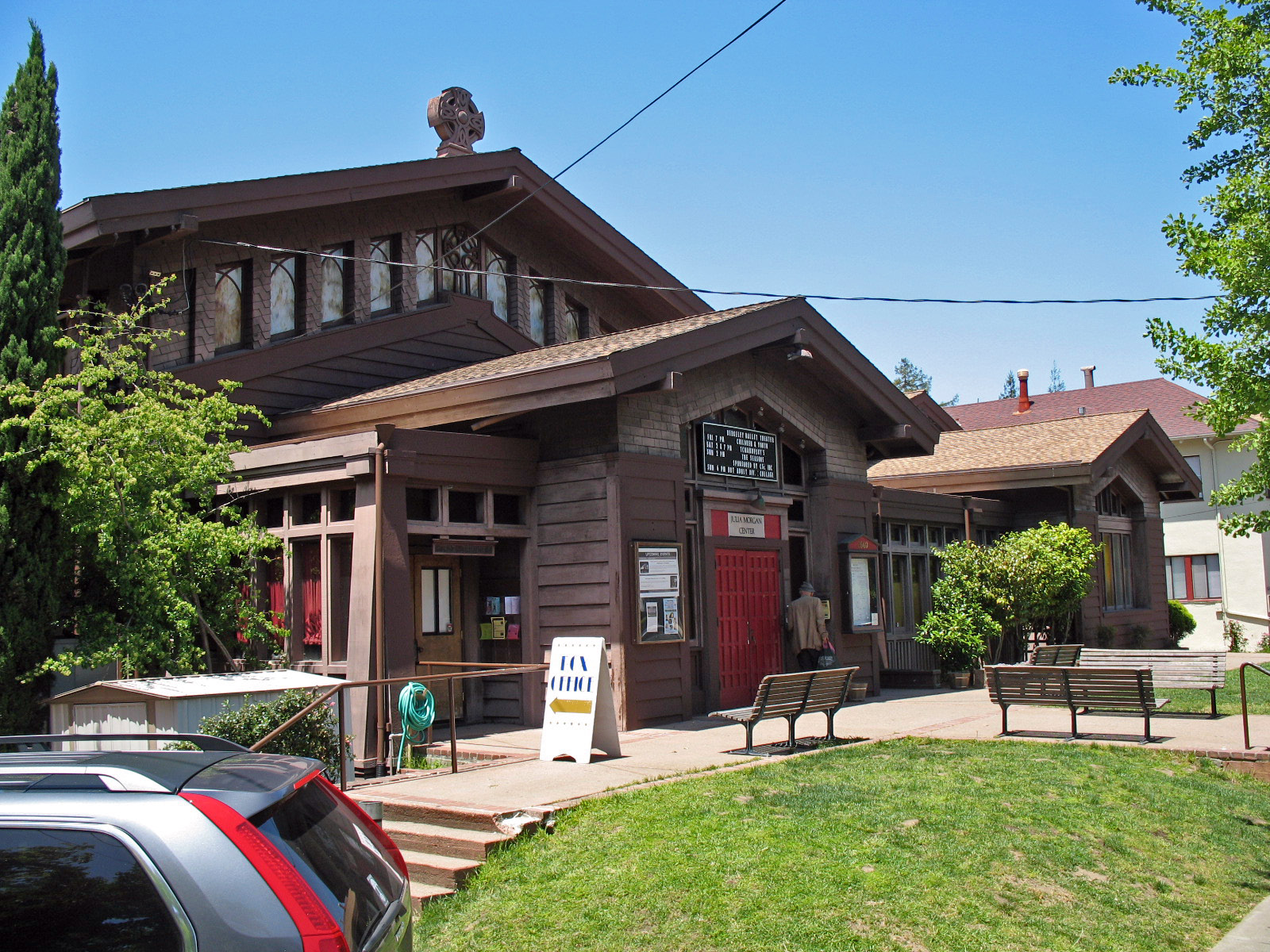
- St. John's Presbyterian Church building in 2009

- Location within Oakland, California Location within California Location within the United States
- Location: 2640 College Ave., Berkeley, California
- Coordinates: 37°51′44″N 122°15′14″W
- Area: 0.6 acres (0.24 ha)
- Built: 1910
- Architect: Julia Morgan
- Architectural style: American Craftsman
- NRHP reference No.: 74000507
- BERKL No.: 8

Significant dates
- Added to NRHP: August 7, 1974
- Designated BERKL: December 15, 1975

The Julia Morgan Theater located in the former St. John's Presbyterian Church is a historic building in Berkeley, California, designed by architect Julia Morgan. The wooden building at 2640 College Avenue is built in the First Bay Tradition style with an exterior wood-shingle finish known as Berkeley Brown Shingle. The church building was desanctified and sold when the congregation moved to a new building in 1974. It now houses the Berkeley Playhouse. The structure is #8 on the city of Berkeley's list of historic landmarks. In 1975 it was added to the National Register of Historic Places (listing #74000507).

== Church ==
The church was organized in 1907 to serve the influx of people moving from San Francisco to Berkeley after the 1906 San Francisco earthquake, and the church building was completed in 1910. The church was named to honor St. John's Presbyterian Church in San Francisco, which many of the new congregants had attended and whose pastor, Dr. George Granville Eldridge, became the founding pastor of St. John's in Berkeley. Subsequent pastors included Dr. Stanley Armstrong Hunter (1924-1954), Dr. James Comfort Smith (1954-1970), Dr. Robert A. McKenzie (1970-1983), Dr. Thomas McKnight (1984-2001), and Dr. Max Lynn (2002–present).

== Architecture ==
Julia Morgan and her assistant Walter Steilberg chose a design with broad gables and a stained shingle exterior. The redwood paneled interior leaves the wooden beams and trusses completely exposed, while smoked glass clerestory windows provide most of the light. "This structural exhibitionism forms a worship space of great visual interest. … The small scale of the church and the warm color of the wood help create a cozy and restful space while the plain lumber serves to remind one of God's creation—the unadorned beauty of natural materials." Morgan herself considered it to be her best Craftsman building.

== Arts center and theater ==
In 1974-75 the congregation moved to a new modern sanctuary at 2727 College Avenue, and the fate of the Julia Morgan building was uncertain. The desire to preserve it from demolition was the major catalyst leading to the formation of the Berkeley Architectural Heritage Association in 1974. The building seemed suitable for use as an arts center, and after a brief incarnation as the Center for World Music, the Julia Morgan Center for the Arts took over the building in 1980. It housed the Berkeley Opera, the Berkeley Ballet Theater, and various theatrical productions as well as arts classes. In 2009 the Julia Morgan Center merged with the Berkeley Playhouse, a theater company founded in 2007 by artistic director Elizabeth McKoy. The Playhouse produces several plays and musicals per year, as well as offering theatrical instruction for a variety of ages and skill levels. The building is known as the Julia Morgan Theatre.

== See also ==
- List of Berkeley landmarks
- List of works by Julia Morgan
- National Register of Historic Places listings in Alameda County, California
