= B. B. Warfield =

American theologian (1851–1921)

The Reverend B. B. Warfield
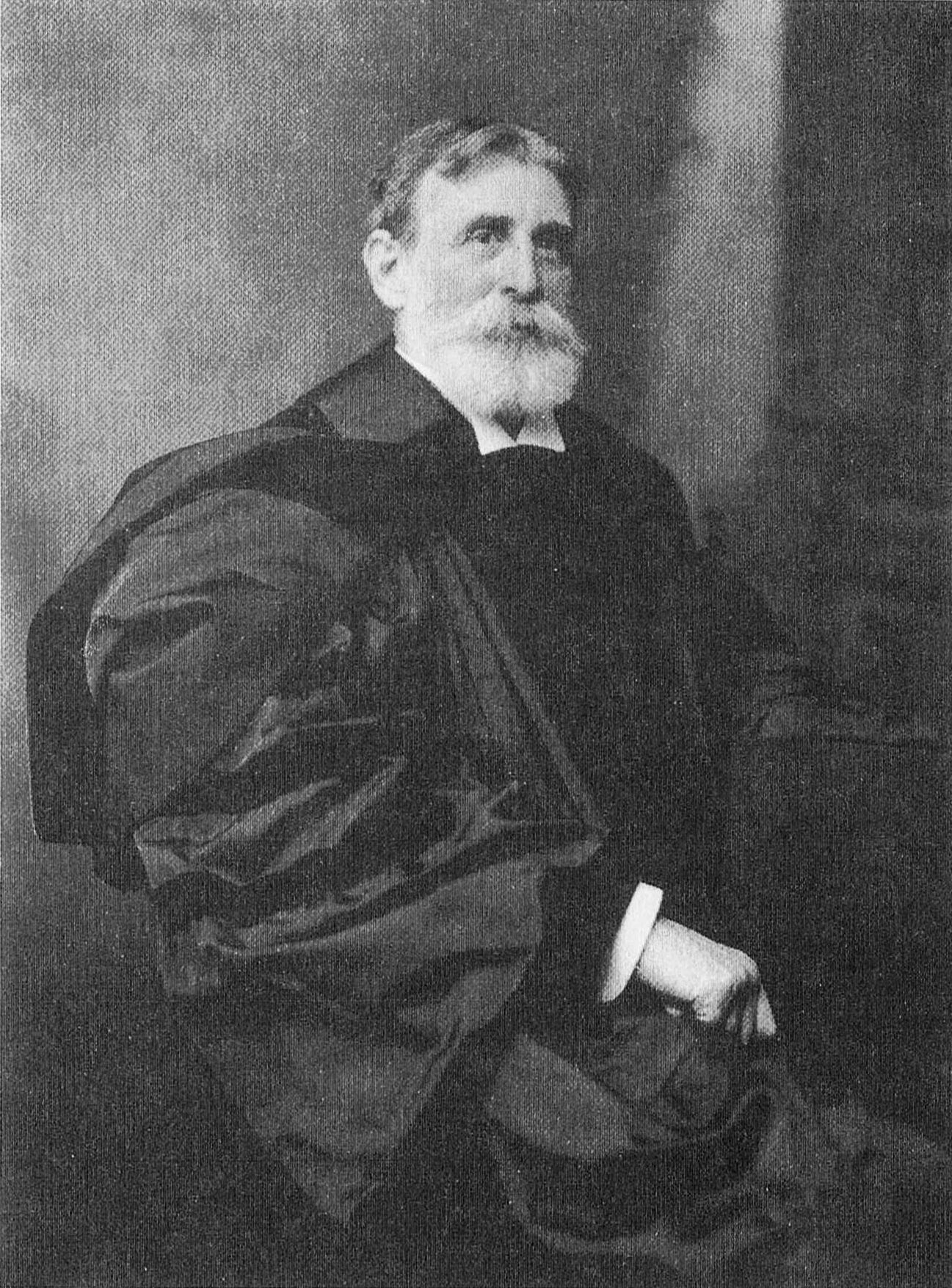
- Portrait of Warfield

4th Principal of Princeton Theological Seminary
- In office 1886–1902
- Preceded by: Archibald Alexander Hodge
- Succeeded by: Francis Landey Patton as first president

Personal details
- Born: Benjamin Breckinridge Warfield; November 5, 1851 Lexington, Kentucky, U.S.
- Died: February 16, 1921 (aged 69) Princeton, New Jersey, U.S.
- Spouse: Annie Pierce Kinkead
- Parent(s): William Warfield; Mary Cabell Breckinridge
- Education: Princeton University; Princeton Seminary

Benjamin Breckinridge Warfield (November 5, 1851 – February 16, 1921) was an American professor of Reformed theology at Princeton Seminary from 1887 to 1921. He served as the last principal of the Princeton Theological Seminary from 1886 to 1902. After the death of Warfield in office, Francis Landey Patton took over the functions of the office as the first president of seminary. Some Presbyterians consider him to be the last of the great Princeton theologians before the split in 1929 that formed Westminster Theological Seminary and the Orthodox Presbyterian Church.

== Biography ==
Benjamin Breckinridge Warfield was born near Lexington, Kentucky on November 5, 1851. His parents were William Warfield and Mary Cabell Breckinridge, originally from Virginia and quite wealthy. His maternal grandfather was the Presbyterian preacher Robert Jefferson Breckinridge (1800–1871), the son of John Breckinridge, a former United States Senator and Attorney General. Warfield's uncle was John C. Breckinridge, the fourteenth Vice President of the United States, and a Confederate general in the American Civil War. His brother, Ethelbert Dudley Warfield was a Presbyterian minister and college president. His fourth cousin twice removed was Wallis Warfield Simpson, whom Great Britain's King Edward VIII abdicated his throne in order to marry.

=== Education ===
Like many children born into a wealthy family, Warfield's childhood education was private. Warfield entered Princeton University in 1868 and graduated in 1871 with high honors. Although Warfield studied mathematics and science in college, while traveling in Europe he decided to study theology, surprising even many of his closest friends. He entered Princeton Seminary in 1873, in order to train for ministry as a Presbyterian minister. He graduated in 1876.

=== Ministry ===
For a short time in 1876 he preached in Presbyterian churches in Concord, Kentucky and Dayton, Ohio as a "supply pastor" — the latter church calling him to be their ordained minister (which he politely refused). In late 1876 Warfield and his new wife moved to Germany where he studied under Christoph Ernst Luthardt and Franz Delitzsch. Warfield was the assistant pastor of First Presbyterian Church in Baltimore, Maryland for a short time. Then he became an instructor at Western Theological Seminary, which is now called Pittsburgh Theological Seminary. He was ordained on April 26, 1879.

In 1881 Warfield wrote a joint article with A. A. Hodge on the inspiration of the Bible. It drew attention because of its scholarly and forceful defense of the inerrancy of the Bible. In many of his writings, Warfield attempted to demonstrate that the doctrine of Biblical inerrancy was simply orthodox Christian teaching, and not merely a concept invented in the nineteenth century. His passion was to refute the liberal element within Presbyterianism and within Christianity at large. Throughout his life, he continued to write books and articles, which are still widely read today.

=== Marriage ===
In August 1876 Warfield married Annie Pierce Kinkead. Soon afterward they visited Germany as Warfield was studying at Leipzig. During their time there, the two were overcome by a fierce thunderstorm. The experience of the storm was so shattering that Kinkead never fully recovered and remained a functional invalid for the rest of her life. Warfield continued to care for her until her death in 1915, managing to fit his work as a theologian with his role as caregiver. They had no children.

=== Princeton and death ===
In 1887 Warfield was appointed to the Charles Hodge Chair at Princeton Theological Seminary, where he succeeded Hodge's son A. A. Hodge. Warfield remained there until his death as the last conservative successor to Hodge to live prior to the re-organization of Princeton Seminary. Warfield is often regarded by Protestant scholarship as the last of the Princeton theologians.

He died in Princeton, New Jersey on February 16, 1921.

== Views ==
=== Bible ===
During his tenure, his primary thrust (and that of the seminary) was an authoritative view of the Bible. This view was held in contrast to the emotionalism of the revival movements, the rationalism of higher criticism, and the heterodox teachings of various new religious movements that were emerging. The seminary held fast to the Reformed confessional tradition — that is, it faithfully followed the Westminster Confession of Faith.

Warfield believed that modernist theology was problematic, since it relied upon the thoughts of the Biblical interpreter rather than upon the divine author of Scripture. He therefore preached and believed the doctrine of sola scriptura — that the Bible is God's inspired word and is sufficient for the Christian to live his or her faith.

Much of Warfield's work centered upon the Bible's "inspiration" by God — that while the authors of the Bible were men, the ultimate author was God himself. The growing influence of modernist theology denied that the Bible was inspired, and alternative theories of the origin of the Christian faith were being explored.

After comparing grammatical and linguistic styles found within the Bible itself, modernist scholars suggested that because the human authors had clearly contributed to the writing of the biblical text, the Bible was written by people alone, not God. Warfield was a central figure in responding to this line of thinking by arguing that the supernatural work of the Holy Spirit did not lead to a form of "mechanical" inspiration (whereby the human authors merely wrote down what God dictated to them), but one in which the human author's intellect was fully able to express itself linguistically, while at the same time being supervised by the Holy Spirit to ensure its inspiration. This approach is essential to understanding the view of inspiration held by many Reformed and Evangelical Christians today. 'Verbal plenary inspiration' is the term that has come to describe this view.

=== Studies in religious experience ===
Warfield was a conservative critic of much religious revivalism that was popular in America at the time. He believed that the teachings and experience of this movement were too subjective and therefore too shallow for deep Christian faith. His book Counterfeit Miracles advocated cessationism over and against miracles after the time of the Apostles. Such attacks did not go unnoticed, and even today Warfield is criticized by proponents of revivalism in the Pentecostal and Charismatic movements. For example, Jack Deere wrote Surprised by the Power of the Spirit with the intention of refuting Counterfeit Miracles. Warfield's book was published before the worldwide spread of Pentecostalism and addressed the issue of claims to the possession of miraculous gifts under the headings, "Patristic and Mediǣval Marvels", "Roman Catholic Miracles", "Irvingite Gifts", "Faith-Healing" and "Mind-Cure".

=== Calvinism ===
Underpinning much of Warfield's theology was his adherence to Calvinism as espoused by the Westminster Confession of Faith. It is sometimes forgotten that, in his battles against modernism on the one hand, and against revivalism on the other, he was simply expressing the Calvinist faith when applied to certain situations.

It was Warfield's belief that the 16th century Reformers, as well as the 17th century Confessional writers, were merely summarizing the content and application of Scripture. New revelations, whether from the minds of celebrated scholars or popular revivalists, were therefore inconsistent with these confessional statements (and therefore inconsistent with Scripture). Throughout his ministry, Warfield contended that modern world events and thinking could never render such confessions obsolete. Such an attitude still prevails today in many Calvinist churches and Christians who embrace Calvinism.

Calvinism is just religion in its purity. We have only, therefore, to conceive of religion in its purity, and that is Calvinism.

— Selected Shorter Writings, vol. I, p. 389.

=== Evolution ===
Warfield's views on evolution have been a source of dispute. Scholars David N. Livingstone and Mark A. Noll highlighted Warfield's statements on evolution to demonstrate his acceptance of the theory in their article A Biblical Inerrantist as Evolutionist. Theologian Fred G. Zaspel argues that these statements have led Livingstone and Noll to assume too much about Warfield's views on the subject. Zaspel writes "That Warfield actually committed himself to a doctrine of evolution seems impossible to affirm simply because although there are some indications that he entertained the idea, he never admits to accepting it."

Warfield studied and wrote about Charles Darwin's religious views. In an article on Darwin's religious life, he concluded that Darwin's doctrine of evolution directly expelled Darwin's Christian belief. Warfield writes, "Thus the doctrine of evolution once heartily adopted by him (Darwin) gradually undermined his faith, until he cast off the whole Christianity as an unproven delusion." Warfield did not believe that evolution required such a rejection of faith. His 1889 review of The Life and Letters of Charles Darwin included this statement: "There have been many evolutionists who have been and have remained theists and Christians."

In his 1915 article Calvin's Doctrine of Creation, Warfield wrote "It should scarcely be passed without remark that Calvin's doctrine of creation is, if we have understood it aright, for all except the souls of men, an evolutionary one. The 'indigested mass,' including the 'promise and potency' of all that was yet to be, was called into being by the simple fiat of God. But all that has come into being since- except the souls of men alone – has arisen as a modification of this original world-stuff by means of the interaction of its intrinsic forces. Not these forces apart from God, of course…" And further more he says, "What concerns us here is that he [Calvin] ascribed the entire series of modifications by which the primal 'indigested mass,' called 'heaven and earth,' has passed into the form of the ordered world which we see, including the origination of all forms of life, vegetable and animal alike, inclusive doubtless of the bodily form of man, to the second causes as their proximate account. And this, we say, is a very pure evolutionary scheme."

Warfield also points out that, "Calvin doubtless had no theory whatsoever of evolution; but he teaches a doctrine of evolution." In that same article, Warfield adds a significant footnote: "H. Bavinck in the first of his Stone Lectures ('The Philosophy of Revelation,' 1909, pp. 9–10) remarks: 'The idea of a development is not a production of modern times. It was already familiar to Greek philosophy. More particularly Aristotle raised it to the rank of the leading principle of his entire system by significant distinction between potentia and actus... This idea of development aroused no objection whatsoever in Christian theology and philosophy. On the contrary, it received extension and enrichment by being linked with the principle of theism.' Calvin accordingly very naturally thought along the lines of a theistic evolutionism."

In a separate reference:

I do not think that there is any general statement in the Bible or any part of the account of creation, either as given in Genesis 1 and 2 or elsewhere alluded to, that need be opposed to evolution.” B. B. Warfield

=== Church politics ===
While he was certainly supportive of political moves within various churches to strengthen and push conservative theology, he was never interested in the actual process itself, preferring to use his work at Princeton to influence future generations of Presbyterian ministers.

=== Race ===
Warfield came from a family of emancipationists and was himself an outspoken opponent of racial segregation and racism at Princeton Seminary. This led to Warfield, when he was principal of the seminary, to allow a black student to live in white university halls, an action which was met by opposition from fellow faculty members. Warfield termed segregation a "wicked caste system" and wrote a number of theological treaties and essays to undermine the segregationist position.

== Influence and legacy ==
Along with Abraham Kuyper and Herman Bavinck, Warfield is acknowledged as one of the major influences on the thought of Cornelius Van Til. However, that influence was limited to certain areas. In apologetics, Warfield was a thoroughgoing evidentialist and the most prominent exponent of the Old Princeton school, whereas van Til, who was the most prominent figure in the Dutch wing of presuppositionalist apologetics, absolutely rejected the central tenets of Old Princeton evidentialism and protested violently against the evidentialism of his contemporary J. Oliver Buswell.

Warfield's influence on contemporary evangelicalism can be seen in the Chicago Statement on Biblical Inerrancy.

== Writings ==
=== Books ===
- Dr. Edwin A. Abbott on the Genuineness of Second Peter (1883)
- Some Difficult Passages in the First Chapter of 2 Corinthians (1886)
- The Canon of the New Testament: How and When Formed (1892)
- The Witness of the Stars (1893)
- Number in Scripture (1894, 1921 4th revised edition)
- The Right of Systematic Theology (1897)
- Acts and Pastoral Epistles Timothy, Titus, and Philemon, Vol. 26 of The Temple Bible (1902)
- The Power of God Unto Salvation (1903)
- The Lord of Glory : A Study of the Designations of Our Lord in the New Testament with Especial Reference to His Deity, (1907)
- The Westminster Assembly and its Work (1908)
- Commentary on Revelation (1909, revised and corrected)
- The Religious Life of Theological Students (1911)
- Concerning Schmiedel's "Pillar-passages." (1913)
- The Plan of Salvation (1915)
- The Bible, The Book of Mankind (1915)
- Faith and Life (1916)
- The Saviour of the World (1916)
- Counterfeit Miracles (1918)
- Are They Few That Be Saved? (1918)
- The Divine Origin of the Bible
- Biblical Doctrines
- Augustine and the Pelagian Controversy
- Studies in Theology
- The Inspiration and Authority of the Bible
- The Making of the Westminster Confession
- The Emotional Life of Our Lord
- The Person of Christ According to the New Testament
- An Introduction to the Textual Criticism of the New Testament

Posthumous works

- Perfectionism: Articles reprinted from periodicals, etc. edited by Ethelbert Dudley Warfield, William Park Armstrong, and Caspar Wistar Hodge (1931)
- Calvin and Calvinism (1931)
- The Inspiration and Authority of the Bible, edited by Samuel G. Craig; with an introduction by Cornelius Van Til. (1948)
- Biblical and Theological Studies, edited by Samuel G. Craig (1952)

=== Essays and sermons (external links) ===
- Site dedicated to the life and writings of B. B. Warfield
- The Leading of the Spirit
- The Rights of Criticism and of the Church
- What is Calvinism?
- A Brief and Untechnical Statement of the Reformed Faith
- Calvinism - The Meaning And Uses of the Term
- The Theology of John Calvin
- Augustine & The Pelagian Controversy: The Origin & Nature of Pelagianism
- Augustine & The Pelagian Controversy: The Theology of Grace
- Augustine & The Pelagian Controversy: The External History of the Pelagian Controversy
- Inspiration (of Scripture)
- The Formation of the Canon of the New Testament
- God-Inspired Scripture
- Calvin and the Bible
- Calvin and the Reformation
- John Calvin The Theologian
- Election
- Some Thoughts on Predestination
- The Plan of Salvation (Part I) (Part II) (Part III) (Part IV) (Part V)
- Photographs of B. B. Warfield's grave at Princeton Cemetery.
- Darwin's Arguments Against Christianity And Religion by Benjamin B. Warfield

== References and notes ==
Academic offices
Preceded by Archibald Alexander Hodge	Principal of Princeton Theological Seminary; 1887–1902	Succeeded by Francis Landey Patton as President of Princeton Theological Seminary
