= List of moderators of the General Assembly of the Orthodox Presbyterian Church =

The following is a list of the years, numbers, locations, moderators, and stated clerks of the General Assembly of the Orthodox Presbyterian Church, with report links included.

== List of moderators ==
Year	Number	Location	Moderator	Stated clerk	Report
1936	1st	Philadelphia, Pennsylvania	Rev. John Gresham Machen	Rev. Paul Woolley	
1936	2nd	Philadelphia, Pennsylvania	Rev. J. Oliver Buswell, Jr.	Rev. Leslie W. Sloat	
1937	3rd	Philadelphia, Pennsylvania	Rev. John J. DeWaard	Rev. Leslie W. Sloat	
1938	4th	Quarryville, Pennsylvania	Rev. R. B. Kuiper	Rev. John H. Skilton	
1939	5th	Philadelphia, Pennsylvania	Rev. Alexander K. Davidson	Rev. Leslie W. Sloat	
1939	6th	Philadelphia, Pennsylvania	Rev. Everett C. DeVelde, Sr.	Rev. Leslie W. Sloat	
1940	7th	Cincinnati, Ohio	Rev. Paul Woolley	Rev. John P. Galbraith	
1941	8th	Cincinnati, Ohio	Rev. Robert Strong	Rev. Paul Woolley	
1942	9th	Rochester, New York	Rev. John P. Clelland	Rev. Robert E. Nicholas	
1943	10th	Willow Grove, Pennsylvania	Rev. Oscar Holkeboer	Rev. Leslie W. Sloat	
1944	11th	Philadelphia, Pennsylvania	Rev. Edwin H. Rian	Rev. Edward Heerema	
1945	12th	Philadelphia, Pennsylvania	Rev. Robert S. Marsden	Rev. Eugene Bradford	
1946	13th	Philadelphia, Pennsylvania	Rev. Ned B. Stonehouse	Rev. Eugene Bradford	
1947	14th	Cedar Grove, Wisconsin	Rev. John P. Galbraith	Rev. Eugene Bradford	
1948	15th	Wildwood, New Jersey	Rev. Edward L. Kellogg	Rev. Robert W. Eckardt	
1949	16th	Los Angeles, California	Rev. Donald M. Poundstone	Rev. Robert W. Eckardt	
1950	17th	Philadelphia, Pennsylvania	Rev. Leslie W. Sloat	Rev. Robert L. Vining	
1951	18th	Philadelphia, Pennsylvania	Rev. Lawrence R. Eyres	Rev. Robert L. Vining	
1952	19th	Denver, Colorado	Elder C. K. Cummings	Rev. Henry D. Phillips	
1953	20th	Philadelphia, Pennsylvania	Rev. John H. Skilton	Rev. Raymond M. Meiners	
1954	21st	Rochester, New York	Rev. Robert K. Churchill	Rev. Raymond M. Meiners	
1955	23rd	Philadelphia, Pennsylvania	Rev. Robert L. Vining	Rev. Robert S. Marsden	
1956	22nd	Littleton, Colorado	Rev. E. J. Young	Rev. Robert S. Marsden	
1957	24th	Collingswood, New Jersey	Rev. Bruce F. Hunt	Rev. Robert S. Marsden	
1958	25th	Oostburg, Wisconsin	Rev. Edmund P. Clowney Jr.	Rev. LeRoy B. Oliver	
1959	26th	Glenside, Pennsylvania	Rev. Leslie A. Dunn	Rev. LeRoy B. Oliver	
1960	27th	Manhattan Beach, California	Elder David Neilands	Rev. LeRoy B. Oliver	
1961	28th	Glenside, Pennsylvania	Rev. John Murray	Rev. LeRoy B. Oliver	
1962	29th	Cedar Grove, Wisconsin	Rev. Robert Atwell	Rev. LeRoy B. Oliver	
1963	30th	Vineland, New Jersey	Rev. LeRoy B. Oliver	Rev. Robert W. Eckardt	
1964	31st	Silver Spring, Maryland	Rev. Glen Coie	Rev. Robert W. Eckardt	
1965	32nd	Portland, Oregon	Rev. Robert W. Eckardt	Rev. Robley J. Johnston	
1966	33rd	Oostburg, Wisconsin	Elder Richard Barker	Rev. Robley J. Johnston	
1967	34th	Long Beach, California	Rev. Henry W. Coray	Rev. Robley J. Johnston	
1968	35th	Westfield, New Jersey	Rev. Arthur O. Olson	Rev. John J. Mitchell	
1969	36th	Silver Spring, Maryland	Rev. Ralph Clough	-	
1970	37th	Portland, Oregon	Rev. John J. Mitchell	Rev. Robert E. Nicholas	
1971	38th	Wilmington, Delaware	Rev. George W. Knight III	Elder Richard A. Barker	
1972	39th	Oostburg, Wisconsin	Rev. Jack J. Peterson	Elder Richard A. Barker	
1973	40th	Manhattan Beach, California	Rev. Charles H. Ellis	Elder Richard A. Barker	
1974	41st	Palos Heights, Illinois	Rev. Laurence N. Vail	Elder Richard A. Barker	
1975	42nd	Beaver Falls, Pennsylvania	Rev. George R. Cottenden	Elder Richard A. Barker	
1976	43rd	Beaver Falls, Pennsylvania	Elder Garret A. Hoogerhyde	Elder Richard A. Barker	
1977	44th	Oostburg, Wisconsin	Rev. Wendell L. Rockey, Jr.	Elder Richard A. Barker	
1978	45th	-	Rev. Larry Conard	Elder Richard A. Barker	
1979	46th	Beaver Falls, Pennsylvania	Rev. George E. Haney	Elder Richard A. Barker	
1980	47th	Beaver Falls, Pennsylvania	-	-	-
1981	48th	-	-	-	-
1982	49th	-	-	-	-
1983	50th	-	-	-	-
1984	51st	-	Rev. Richard B. Gaffin, Jr.	Rev. John P. Galbraith	-
1985	52nd	-	-	Rev. John P. Galbraith	-
1986	53rd	-	Rev. Robert Benson Strimple	Rev. John P. Galbraith	-
1987	54th	-	-	Rev. John P. Galbraith	-
1988	55th	-	-	Rev. John P. Galbraith	-
1989	56th	-	-	Rev. John P. Galbraith	-
1990	57th	California	Rev. Donald Poundstone	-	-
1991	58th	-	Rev. William E. Warren	-	-
1992	59th	-	Rev. Stephen Phillips	Rev. Donald J. Duff	-
1993	60th	-	-	Rev. Donald J. Duff	-
1994	61st	-	-	Rev. Donald J. Duff	-
1995	62nd	-	Rev. Douglas Watson	Rev. Donald J. Duff	-
1996	63rd	Beaver Falls, Pennsylvania	Elder David Winslow	Rev. Donald J. Duff	
1997	64th	Beaver Falls, Pennsylvania	Rev. John Mahaffy	Rev. Donald J. Duff	
1998	65th	Grand Rapids, Michigan	Rev. Ross Graham	Rev. Donald J. Duff	
1999	66th	Grand Rapids, Michigan	Rev. Larry G. Mininger	Rev. Donald J. Duff	
2000	67th	Tacoma, Washington	Elder James S. Gidley	Rev. Donald J. Duff	
2001	68th	Grand Rapids, Michigan	Rev. David J. O'Leary	Rev. Donald J. Duff	
2002	69th	Wenham, Massachusetts	Rev. Douglas B. Clawson	Rev. Donald J. Duff	
2003	70th	Sioux Center, Iowa	Elder Robert M. Coie	Rev. Donald J. Duff	
2004	71st	Beaver Falls, Pennsylvania	Rev. Larry E. Wilson	Rev. Donald J. Duff	
2005	72nd	Grand Rapids, Michigan	Rev. James Bosgraf	Rev. Donald J. Duff	
2006	73rd	Palos Heights, Illinois	Rev. Richard Gerber	Rev. Donald J. Duff	
2007	74th	Sioux Center, Iowa	Rev. Robert Y. Eckhardt	Rev. Donald J. Duff	
2008	75th	Seattle, Washington	Rev. Alan Strange	Rev. Donald J. Duff	
2009	76th	Grand Rapids, Michigan	Rev. William Shishko	Rev. Donald J. Duff	
2010	77th	Palos Heights, Illinois	Rev. Alan R. Pontier	Rev. Donald J. Duff	
2011	78th	North East, Maryland	Rev. Daniel Olinger	Rev. George Cottenden	
2012	79th	Wheaton, Illinois	Rev. L. Anthony Curto	Rev. George Cottenden	
2013	80th	Moraga, California	Rev. Jeffrey Landis	Rev. George Cottenden	
2014	81st	Grand Rapids, Michigan	Rev. Craig Troxel	Rev. George Cottenden	
2015	82nd	Sioux Center, Iowa	Rev. Archibald A. Allison	Rev. Ross W. Graham	
2016	83rd	North East, Maryland	Elder Paul Tavares	Rev. Ross W. Graham	
2017	84th	Palos Heights, Illinois	Rev. Larry Westerveld	Rev. Ross W. Graham	
2018	85th	Wheaton, Illinois		Rev. Ross W. Graham	

== Notable General Assemblies ==
=== 1st General Assembly ===
At the First General Assembly in Philadelphia, Pennsylvania in 1936, the Presbyterian Church of America (now the Orthodox Presbyterian Church) was established by conservative minister John Gresham Machen.

=== 32nd General Assembly ===
At the 32nd General Assembly of the Orthodox Presbyterian Church in Portland, Oregon, Mark O. Hatfield, the Governor of Oregon, offered welcome remarks.
