= J. Gresham Machen =

American theologian (1881–1937)

The Reverend J. Gresham Machen
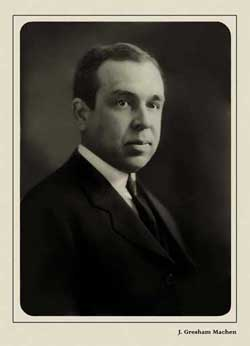
- Born: John Gresham Machen; July 28, 1881; Baltimore, Maryland, U.S.
- Died: January 1, 1937 (aged 55); Bismarck, North Dakota, U.S.
- Resting place: Green Mount Cemetery
- Known for: Founding Westminster Theological Seminary and the Orthodox Presbyterian Church

Ecclesiastical career
- Religion: Christian (Presbyterian)
- Church: Presbyterian Church in the United States of America; Orthodox Presbyterian Church
- Ordained: 1914
- Offices held: Moderator of the General Assembly of the Orthodox Presbyterian Church (1936) (Note: The Orthodox Presbyterian Church was known as the Presbyterian Church of America until 1939.)

Academic background
- Influences: Francis Landey Patton; B. B. Warfield

Academic work
- Discipline: Biblical studies; theology
- Sub-discipline: New Testament studies
- School or tradition: Princeton theology
- Institutions: Princeton Theological Seminary; Westminster Theological Seminary
- Influenced: Carl McIntire; Harold Ockenga; Francis Schaeffer

John Gresham Machen (/ˈɡrɛsəm ˈmeɪtʃən/; (Note: Asked how to say his name, he told The Literary Digest, "The first syllable is pronounced like May, the name of the month. In the second syllable the ch is as in chin, with e as in pen: may'chen. In Gresham, the h is silent: gres'am.") 1881–1937) was an American Presbyterian New Testament scholar and educator in the early 20th century. He was the Professor of New Testament at Princeton Seminary between 1906 and 1929, and led a revolt against modernist theology at Princeton and formed Westminster Theological Seminary as a more orthodox alternative. As the Northern Presbyterian Church continued to reject conservative attempts to enforce faithfulness to the Westminster Confession, Machen led a small group of conservatives out of the church to form the Orthodox Presbyterian Church (OPC). When the Presbyterian Church in the United States of America (PCUSA) rejected his arguments during the mid-1920s and decided to reorganize Princeton Seminary to create a liberal school, Machen took the lead in founding Westminster Seminary in Philadelphia (1929) where he taught New Testament until his death. His continued opposition during the 1930s to liberalism in his denomination's foreign missions agencies led to the creation of a new organization, the Independent Board for Presbyterian Foreign Missions (1933). The trial, conviction and suspension from the ministry of Independent Board members, including Machen, in 1935 and 1936 provided the rationale for the formation in 1936 of the OPC.

Machen is considered to be the last of the great Princeton theologians who had, since the formation of the seminary in the early 19th century, developed Princeton theology: a conservative and Calvinist form of Evangelical Christianity. Although Machen can be compared to the great Princeton theologians (Archibald Alexander, Charles Hodge, A. A. Hodge, and B. B. Warfield), he was neither a lecturer in theology (he was a New Testament scholar) nor did he ever become the seminary's principal.

Machen's influence can still be felt today through the existence of the institutions that he founded: Westminster Theological Seminary, the Independent Board for Presbyterian Foreign Missions, and the Orthodox Presbyterian Church. In addition, his textbook on basic New Testament Greek is still used today in many seminaries, including PCUSA schools.

== Early life ==
Machen was born in Baltimore, Maryland, on July 28, 1881, to Arthur Webster Machen and Mary Jones Gresham. Arthur, a Baltimore lawyer, was 45 and Mary was 24 when they married. While Arthur was an Episcopalian, Mary was a Presbyterian, and taught her son the Westminster Shorter Catechism from an early age. The family attended Franklin Street Presbyterian Church.

Machen attended a private college and received a classical education including Latin and Greek. He also learned to play the piano.

== Early adulthood ==
In 1898, the 17-year-old Machen began studying at Johns Hopkins University for his bachelor's degree, and performed sufficiently well to gain a scholarship. He majored in classics and was a member of the Phi Kappa Psi fraternity. Machen was a brilliant scholar and in 1901 was elected to Phi Beta Kappa society after graduation.

Despite having some indecisiveness about his future, in 1902 Machen opted to study theology at Princeton Seminary, while simultaneously studying a Master of Arts in philosophy at Princeton University.

He also pursued theological studies at the Universities of Marburg and of Goettingen for the academic year of 1905–06, where he was introduced to the German history-of-religions school which approached the biblical text through materialist history and scientific methods. In a letter to his father, he admitted being thrown into confusion about his faith because of the liberalism taught by Professor Wilhelm Herrmann. Although he had an enormous respect for Herrmann, his time in Germany and his engagement with Modernist theologians led him to reject the movement and embrace conservative Reformed theology more firmly than before.

== Pre-war period ==
In 1906, Machen joined the Princeton Seminary as an instructor in the New Testament, after receiving an assurance that he would not have to sign a statement of faith. Among his Princeton influences were Francis Landey Patton, who had been the prosecutor in a nineteenth-century heresy trial, and B. B. Warfield, whom he described as the greatest man he had ever met. Warfield maintained that correct doctrine was the primary means by which Christians influenced the surrounding culture. He emphasized a high view of scripture and the defence of supernaturalism. It appears that under their influence Machen resolved his crisis of faith. In 1914, he was ordained and the next year he became an assistant professor of New Testament studies.

Machen did not serve "conventionally" during the First World War, but instead went to France with the YMCA to do volunteer work near and at the front—a task he continued for some time after the war. Though not a combatant, he witnessed first-hand the devastations of modern warfare. Suspicious of his family friend Woodrow Wilson's project of spreading democracy and of imperialism, he was staunchly opposed to the war, and upon returning to the US, he saw that many of the provisions of, "the Treaty of Versailles constituted an attack upon international and interracial peace.... [W]ar will follow upon war in a wearisome progression."

== Post-war period ==
=== Princeton, 1918–1926 ===
After returning from Europe, Machen continued his work as a New Testament scholar at Princeton. During this period he gained a reputation as one of the few true scholars who was able to debate the growing prevalence of modernist theology whilst maintaining an evangelical stance. The Origin of Paul's Religion (1921) is perhaps Machen's best known scholarly work. This book was a successful attempt at critiquing the Modernist belief that Paul's religion was based mainly upon Greek philosophy and was entirely different from the religion of Jesus. Christianity and Liberalism (1923) is another of Machen's books that critiqued theological modernism. The book compared conservative Protestantism to the rising popularity of modernist (or "liberal") theology. He concluded that "the chief modern rival of Christianity is Liberalism". In What Is Faith? (1925) he set before him the pastoral task of anchoring faith in the historical fact of Christ's atonement. He found liberal theology anti-intellectual, insofar as it spiritualized Christianity and treated it as merely an expression of individual experience, thus emptying the Bible and creeds of all definitive meaning. These books, along with a number of others, placed Machen firmly in one theological camp within the Presbyterian Church. His work throughout the 1920s was divided between his time at Princeton and his political work with evangelical Presbyterians. Despite his conservative theological beliefs, Machen was never able to fully embrace popularist fundamentalism either. His refusal to accept premillennialism and other aspects of fundamentalist belief was based upon his belief that Calvinist theology was the most biblical form of Christian belief—a theology that was generally missing from fundamentalism at the time. Moreover, Machen's scholarly work and ability to engage with modernist theology was at odds with fundamentalism's anti-intellectual attitude.

=== Controversies ===
In 1924 and 1925, relations among the Princeton faculty deteriorated when The Presbyterian questioned if there were two different parties on the faculty. In response Machen remarked that his differences with Charles Erdman related to the importance they attributed to doctrine. He noted that Erdman was tolerant of those in doctrinal error. Erdman wrote privately 'he (Dwight L. Moody) knew that controversialists do not usually win followers for Christ.'

=== Westminster Theological Seminary ===
The 1929 General Assembly voted to reorganise Princeton Seminary and appointed two of the Auburn Affirmation signatories as trustees. The Auburn Affirmation was a response by liberals within the Northern Presbyterian Church that condemned the General Assembly's response to the controversy arising out of Harry Emerson Fosdick's May 1922 sermon "Shall the Fundamentalists Win?" Machen and some colleagues withdrew and set up Westminster Theological Seminary to continue reformed orthodox theology.

=== Orthodox Presbyterian Church ===
In 1933, Machen, concerned about liberalism tolerated by Presbyterians on the mission field, formed The Independent Board for Presbyterian Foreign Missions. The next Presbyterian General Assembly reaffirmed that Independent Board was unconstitutional and gave the associated clergy an ultimatum to break their links. When Machen and seven other clergy refused, they were suspended from the Presbyterian ministry. The controversy divided Machen from many of his fundamentalist friends including Clarence Macartney who dropped away at the prospect of schism. Ultimately, Machen withdrew from the Northern Presbyterian Church and formed what later came to be known as the Orthodox Presbyterian Church.

In his book The Great Evangelical Disaster, Francis Schaeffer details the theological shift in American Christianity from conservatism to liberalism. In that discussion, Schaeffer describes how Machen's "defrocking" rightly became front-page news in the secular media of the country. Schaeffer concludes: "A good case could be made that the news about Machen was the most significant U.S. news in the first half of the twentieth century. It was the culmination of a long trend toward liberalism within the Presbyterian Church and represented the same trend in most other denominations" (p. 35).

=== Religion and politics ===
Machen was suspicious of mixing religion and politics. He found attempts to establish a Christian culture by political means insensitive to minorities. He was even more concerned about the corrupting influence of politics on Christianity and saw the social gospel as a terrible warning. He opposed school prayer and Bible reading in public school. This position, however, implied that Christians should run their own schools.

Historian George Marsden has described Machen as "radically libertarian. He opposed almost any extension of state power and took stands on a variety of issues. Like most libertarians, his stances violated usual categories of liberal or conservative." He opposed the establishment of a federal Department of Education, suggesting before a joint Congressional committee that government control of the children was the ultimate sacrifice of freedom (he was also opposed to the Child Labor Amendment, proposed in 1924). He was not against locally operated public schools per se, but feared the influence of materialist ideology and opposition to higher human aspirations. He also opposed Prohibition—a costly stance in an age when abstinence was almost a creed among Protestants. He was opposed to a foreign policy of imperialism and militarism.

== Personal life ==
In an essay which won the Mollenkott Award for LGBTQ religious history, Austin Steelman discussed Machen's 1906 religious crisis in Germany, and suggested that Machen's reference to a "moral fault" may refer to same-sex desire. R. Scott Clark questioned Steelman's claim that Machen's crisis stemmed from repressed homosexuality, arguing that it came from intellectual and spiritual doubts.

== Death ==
Machen died on January 1, 1937, at the age of 55. Some commentators (notably Ned Stonehouse) point out that Machen's "constitution" was not always strong, and that he was constantly "burdened" with his responsibilities at the time.

Machen had decided to honor some speaking engagements he had in North Dakota in December, 1936, but developed pleurisy in the exceptionally cold weather there. After Christmas, he was hospitalized for pneumonia and died on January 1, 1937. Just before his death, he dictated a telegram to long-time friend and colleague John Murray, the content of which reflected deeply his lifelong faith: "I'm so thankful for active obedience of Christ. No hope without it." He is buried in Green Mount Cemetery in Baltimore. The stone covering his grave bears, very simply, his name, degree, dates, and the phrase "Faithful Unto Death", in Greek.

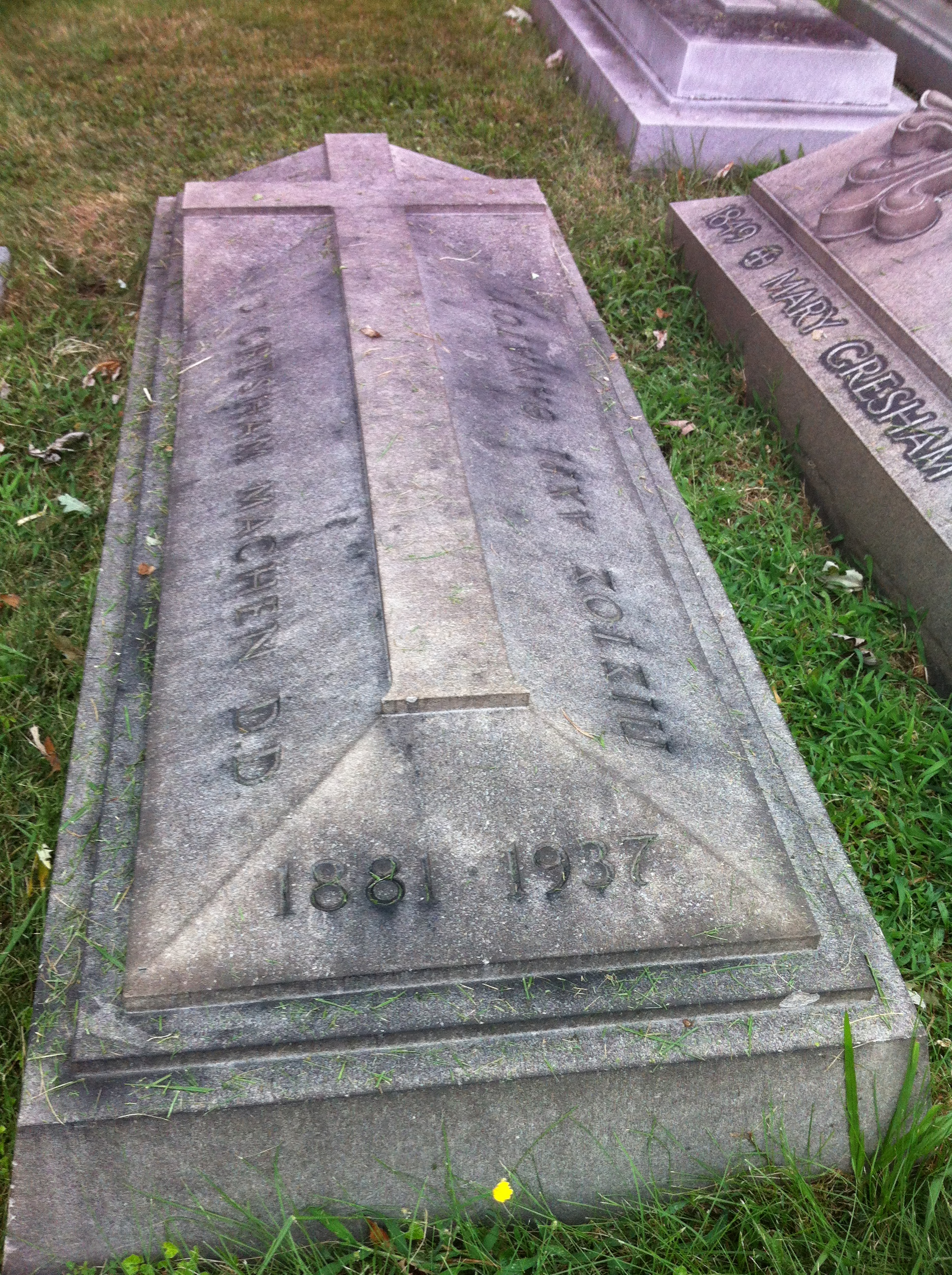
Machen's grave in Green Mount Cemetery, Baltimore

The Baltimore-born journalist H. L. Mencken wrote an editorial on Machen in December 1931 and later contributed an obituary titled "Dr. Fundamentalis" that was published in the Baltimore Evening Sun on January 18, 1937. While disagreeing with Machen's theology, Mencken nevertheless articulated a great respect and admiration for his intellectual ability. He noted that Machen "fell out with the reformers who have been trying, in late years, to convert the Presbyterian Church into a kind of literary and social club, devoted vaguely to good works", and that "though he lost in the end and was forced out of Princeton, it must be manifest that he marched off to Philadelphia with all the honors of war." Mencken also compared Machen to William Jennings Bryan, another well-known Presbyterian and conservative Christian leader, with the statement, "Dr. Machen himself was to Bryan as the Matterhorn is to a wart."

Machen left half his considerable estate to Westminster Seminary in Philadelphia. Giving $10,000 outright to the seminary, Dr. Machen provided that half of the balance, after certain bequests to his brothers and others were cared for, should be placed in the hands of five trustees to be held for the benefit of Westminster Seminary. Ten percent of the residuary estate was to go to the Independent Board. The will was drawn in 1935, before the establishing of The Presbyterian Guardian and before the organization of the new Church. The gross estate was estimated at $175,000.

== Works ==
In addition to those mentioned in the main article, Machen's works include:

- "Christianity and Culture". Princeton Theological Review. 11. 1913. Archived from the original on 2003-07-31.
- The Literature and History of New Testament Times (1915)
- Recent Criticism of the Book of Acts (1919)
- The Origin of Paul's Religion. 1921. Archived from the original on 2003-05-02.
- Teaching the Teacher: A First Book in Teacher Training (1921) (Contributing author)
- A Brief Bible History: A Survey of the Old and New Testaments (1922)
- New Testament Greek for Beginners (1923)
- Christianity and Liberalism. New York: Macmillan. 1923. Archived from the original on 2017-05-06. New ed. 2009 ISBN 9780802864994
- What Is Faith? (1925)
- The Virgin Birth of Christ (1930)
- Things Unseen: A Systematic Introduction to the Christian Faith and Reformed Theology (1936–36) Three series of radio addresses given in Philadelphia
- The Christian Faith in the Modern World (1936)
- The Christian View of Man (1937)
- God Transcendent (1949) edited by Ned B. Stonehouse from Machen's sermons, ISBN 0-85151-355-7.
- What Is Christianity? And Other Addresses (1951) edited by Ned B. Stonehouse
- Stonehouse, Ned B., ed. (1951). "The Necessity of the Christian School". What Is Christianity? And Other Essays. Grand Rapids.
- The New Testament: An Introduction to Its Literature and History (1976) edited by W. John Cook from two sets of Machen's course materials, ISBN 0-85151-240-2

== See also ==
- Cornelius Van Til
- Fundamentalist–Modernist controversy
