= The Presbyterian Guardian =

Monthly Presbyterian magazine

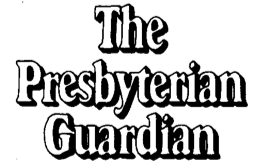
- Type: Monthly
- Format: Tabloid
- Owner: Presbyterian Guardian Publishing Corporation
- Founder: John Gresham Machen
- Publisher: Presbyterian Guardian Publishing Corporation
- President: O. Palmer Robertson
- Editor: J. Cameron Fraser
- Founded: 7 October 1935
- Ceased publication: October 1979
- Political alignment: Right
- Language: English
- Headquarters: 7401 Old York Road Philadelphia, Pennsylvania 19126
- Circulation: 3,500 (1979)
- ISSN: 0032-7522
- Free online archives: http://www.opc.org/guardian.html

The Presbyterian Guardian was a monthly conservative Presbyterian magazine. Founded by conservative theologian John Gresham Machen in 1935, it acted as the de facto publication of the Orthodox Presbyterian Church, whose members made up most of its readership, despite being officially unaffiliated with any one denomination. In 1979, it merged with The Presbyterian Journal, which had a significantly larger circulation and similar conservative theological stances.

== History ==
On 7 October 1935, Rev. John Gresham Machen established The Presbyterian Guardian to serve as the voice of conservative Presbyterianism in the United States, the main denomination of which, the Presbyterian Church in the United States of America, had become fairly liberal and modernist. James T. Dennison Jr., compiler of a cumulative index to the magazine, wrote that The Presbyterian Guardian was "conceived in controversy." Machen had been encountering significant theological disagreements with Dr. Samuel G. Craig, editor of Christianity Today (1930–1949) (not to be confused with Christianity Today, the magazine founded in 1956). In response to perceived modernism in the magazine, Machen began publishing The Guardian with a small group of conservative ministers and laymen, hiring Rev. H. McAllister Griffiths as the first Editor.

The magazine saw eight more editors during its tenure, including Machen himself, as well as Revs. Ned Stonehouse, Charles Woodbridge, and Paul Woolley. Machen's name was proudly displayed on the masthead of the magazine from January 1938 until 1979, reading: "J. Gresham Machen, Editor 1936-37."

In April 1978, the Board of Trustees asked J. Cameron Fraser, a native Scot who was then a graduate student at Westminster Seminary to take the position of Managing Editor for 14 months while they contemplated the newspaper's future. On 30 August 1979, the Board voted to merge The Presbyterian Guardian with The Presbyterian Journal. Fraser's term as Managing Editor was extended into autumn and the final issue was published in October 1979. The Presbyterian Journal ceased publication in 1987, and in the same year the magazine World was created by Joel Belz. World, unlike its predecessor, is not explicitly Presbyterian, but of the same conservative Protestant slant.

== List of editors ==
Editor	Tenure	Coeditor	Tenure
Rev. H. McAllister Griffiths	1935–1936	none	1935–1936
Rev. John Gresham Machen	1936–1937	Rev. Ned B. Stonehouse	1936–1937
Rev. Ned B. Stonehouse	1937	none	1937–1945
Rev. Charles J. Woodbridge	1937	none	1937–1945
Rev. Ned B. Stonehouse	1937–1948	none	1937–1945
Rev. Ned B. Stonehouse	1937–1948	Rev. Paul Woolley	1945–1947
Rev. Ned B. Stonehouse	1937–1948	none	1947–1956
Rev. Leslie W. Sloat	1948–1958	none	1947–1956
Rev. Leslie W. Sloat	1948–1958	Rev. Ned B. Stonehouse	1956–1958
Rev. Robert E. Nicholas	1958–1970	none	1958–1979
Rev. John J. Mitchell	1970–1977	none	1958–1979
J. Cameron Fraser	1978–1979	none	1958–1979

=== Board of trustees ===
The following made up the last Board of Trustees of The Presbyterian Guardian:

- Rev. O. Palmer Robertson, Acting President
- Rev. LeRoy B. Oliver, Secretary
- Rev. George E. Haney, Treasurer
- F. Kingsley Elder Jr.
- Leonard Lowrey
- James R. Peaster
- Rev. John H. White
- Hugh Brown
- Rev. John P. Galbraith
- Rev. Robley J. Johnston
- Rev. Arthur W. Kuschke Jr.
- Rev. Paul Settle
- John Van Voorhis
- Glenn H. Andreas
- Rev. Edmund P. Clowney
- Rev. Joseph A. Pipa Jr.
- Rev. Robert L. Reymond
- Rev. A. Michael Schneider III

== See also ==
- John Gresham Machen
- Orthodox Presbyterian Church
- World (magazine)
