= Princeton theology =

Tradition at Princeton Theological Seminary (1812–1920s)

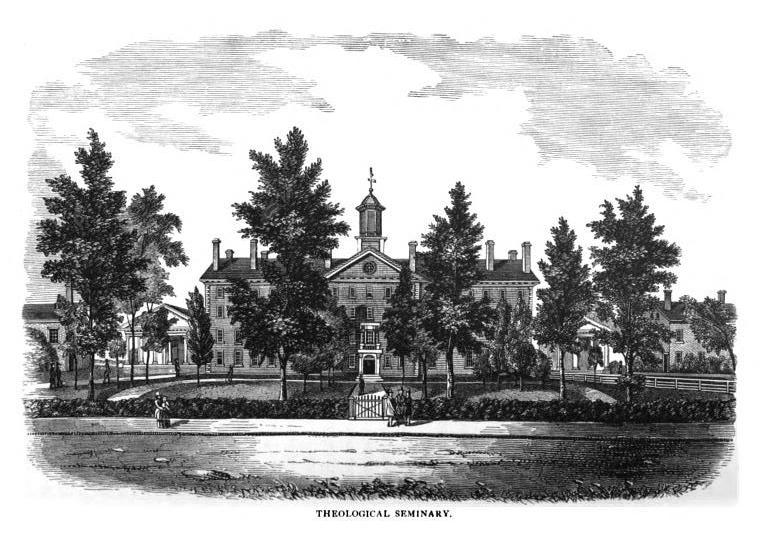
Princeton Seminary in the 19th century

The Princeton theology was a tradition of conservative Reformed and Presbyterian theology at Princeton Theological Seminary lasting from the founding of that institution in 1812 until the 1920s, after which, due to the increasing influence of theological liberalism at the school, the last Princeton theologians left to found Westminster Theological Seminary. The appellation has special reference to certain theologians, from Archibald Alexander to B. B. Warfield, and their particular blend of teaching, which together with its Old School Presbyterian Calvinist orthodoxy sought to express a warm evangelicalism and a high standard of scholarship. W. Andrew Hoffecker argues that they strove to "maintain a balance between the intellectual and affective elements in the Christian faith."

By extension, the Princeton theologians include those predecessors of Princeton Theological Seminary who prepared the groundwork of that theological tradition, and the successors who tried, and failed, to preserve the seminary against the inroads of a program to better conform that graduate school to "broad evangelicalism", which was imposed upon it by the Presbyterian Church in the United States of America.

== History ==
William Tennent Sr. of the Log College, Gilbert Tennent and William Tennent Jr. of the College of New Jersey, and Jonathan Edwards of Princeton University are considered predecessors to the Princeton theologians. Archibald Alexander, Charles Hodge, A. A. Hodge, and B. B. Warfield were major figures promoting the Princeton theology. The quarterly journal Biblical Repertory, later renamed the Princeton Review, was an important publication promoting this school. Albert Baldwin Dod, Lyman Hotchkiss Atwater, and John Breckinridge were frequent contributors of this journal. Geerhardus Vos, J. Gresham Machen, Cornelius Van Til, Oswald T. Allis, Robert Dick Wilson, and John Murray were notable successors of the Princeton theologians. Of these, only Machen and Wilson represented the American Presbyterian tradition that was directly influenced by the Princeton theology. Vos and Van Til were Dutch Reformed. Murray was a Scot, but a student under Machen at Princeton who later followed him to Westminster Theological Seminary. Murray and Van Til were both ministers in the Orthodox Presbyterian Church, which Machen founded.

== Theology ==
Mark Noll, an evangelical ecclesiastical historian, sees the "grand motifs" of the Princeton theology as being "devotion to the Bible, concern for religious experience, sensitivity to the American experience, and full employment of Presbyterian confessions, seventeenth-century Reformed systematicians, and the Scottish philosophy of Common Sense." Allegiance to the Bible as the supreme norm was common in the 19th century, and not a distinctive of the Princeton theologians. Princeton was, however, distinguished by the academic rigor with which it approached the Bible. Alexander and his successors sought to defend the doctrines they found in the Bible against rival claims from learned scholars. Charles Hodge saw faithfulness to the Bible as the best defense against higher criticism as well as the overly experiential focus of Friedrich Schleiermacher.

Princeton theologians saw themselves in the line of Reformed Protestantism stretching back to John Calvin. The dogmatics of Francis Turretin, a Reformed scholastic of the 17th century, was the primary textbook of theology at Princeton. In a world which increasingly valued the new over the old, these theologians preferred the theological systems of the 16th and 17th centuries. The various Reformed confessions were viewed as harmonious voices of a common theological tradition, which the theologians held as simply a distillation of the teaching of the Bible.
