= Caspar Wistar Hodge Sr. =

American biblical scholar (1830–1891)

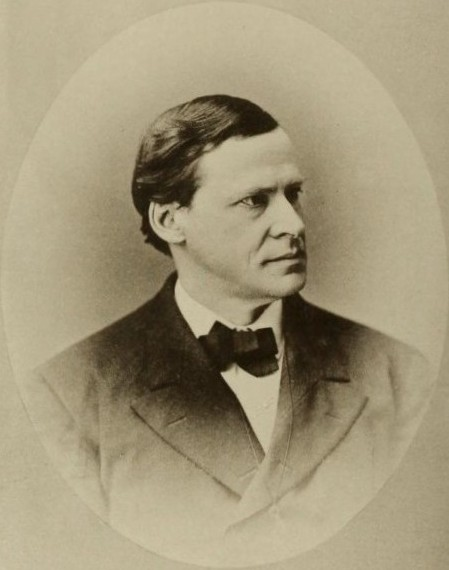
C. Wistar Hodge in 1879

Caspar Wistar Hodge Sr. (February 21, 1830 – September 27, 1891) was an American biblical scholar. Like his father Charles Hodge and older brother Archibald Alexander Hodge, he taught at Princeton Theological Seminary, serving as Professor of New Testament.

Hodge was born in Princeton, New Jersey on February 21, 1830. Named after his maternal great-uncle Caspar Wistar, he was the third child and second son of Charles Hodge and Sarah Bache Hodge, a great-granddaughter of Benjamin Franklin. Growing up in Princeton, he was tutored in English and Greek by his father's colleague J. Addison Alexander.

Hodge studied at the College of New Jersey, graduating at the top of his class with an A.B. degree in 1848. After considering a career in medicine, he instead entered the Princeton Seminary in 1849, graduating from the three-year program in 1853 while also tutoring at the undergraduate college from 1850 to 1852. Hodge was ordained by the Presbytery of New York in 1854, serving as a pastor in Williamsburgh, New York until 1856 and then in Oxford, Pennsylvania until 1860. He then taught at the seminary from 1861 until his death.

Hodge published very little work. James H. Moorhead suggests that "his father's commanding reputation may have set the bar of achievement so high that Wistar was reluctant to put his thoughts into print." Moorhead also notes that although his theological convictions "represented the rock-ribbed orthodoxy for which his father had contended," the younger Hodge "did not see himself as a controversialist".

Hodge was conferred an honorary D.D. degree by Princeton University in 1865. The university also conferred an honorary LL.D. degree on him in 1891, a few months before he died in Princeton on September 27, 1891.

Hodge's son, Caspar Wistar Hodge Jr., also taught at Princeton Seminary.
