= Francis Landey Patton =

American educator and theologian (1843–1932)

The Reverend Francis Landey Patton
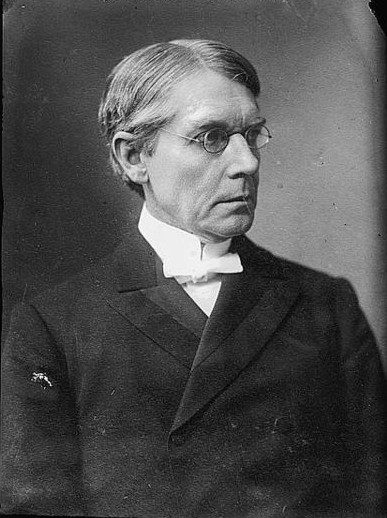

12th President of Princeton University
- In office 1888–1902
- Preceded by: James McCosh
- Succeeded by: Woodrow Wilson

1st President of Princeton Theological Seminary
- In office 1902–1913
- Preceded by: Position established Benjamin Breckinridge Warfield as principal
- Succeeded by: J. Ross Stevenson

Personal details
- Born: January 22, 1843 Warwick Parish, Bermuda
- Died: November 26, 1932 (aged 89) Hamilton, Bermuda
- Education: University of Toronto; Princeton Theological Seminary

Francis Landey Patton (January 22, 1843 – November 25, 1932) was a Bermudian-American educator, Presbyterian minister, academic administrator, and theologian, and served as the twelfth president of Princeton University.

== Background, 1843–1871 ==
Patton was born in Warwick Parish, Bermuda, to a family of Scottish descent. He attended Warwick Academy. As a child, the family relocated to Canada. Patton received collegiate education at the University of Toronto, followed by a theological education at Knox College, Toronto. He graduated from Princeton Theological Seminary in 1865. He was ordained to the Presbyterian ministry in June 1865; was pastor of the 84th Street Presbyterian Church, New York City, and in 1867–1870, of the South Church, Brooklyn.

== Years in Chicago, 1871–1881 ==
In 1871, Patton moved to Chicago to become minister of the Jefferson Park Presbyterian Church, Chicago (1874–1881). From 1872 to 1881, he was also a professor at McCormick Theological Seminary, Chicago. He wrote The Inspiration of the Scriptures (1869), and Summary of Christian Doctrine (1874).

Patton was opposed to the spread of liberal Christianity in his denomination, the Presbyterian Church in the United States of America. As editor of a Presbyterian weekly entitled Interior, he denounced the growth of liberalism in the Chicago Presbytery.

He brought charges of heresy in 1874 against David Swing (a confidant of Abraham Lincoln and Mary Todd Lincoln). He was prosecuting attorney at Swing's trial at Presbytery. He accused Swing of subscribing to a modern version of the heresy of Sabellianism and of unduly countenancing Unitarianism. Patton lost his case and Chicago Presbytery acquitted Swing, but Patton had gained a new prominence in the denomination and this was partially responsible for his election as moderator of the General Assembly of the Presbyterian Church in 1878.

== Early years at the College of New Jersey, 1881–1888 ==
In 1881, he left Chicago and became Stuart professor "of the relation of philosophy and science to the Christian religion" (a chair founded for him) at Princeton Theological Seminary. He co-edited the Presbyterian Review with Dr. Charles A Briggs, 1880–1888. At Princeton, Patton found like-minded theologians - proponents of the so-called Princeton theology - a conservative theological position that, within the Presbyterian church, was a competitor to the liberal "Chicago school".

== President of Princeton University, 1888–1902 ==
In 1888, he was elected president of the College of New Jersey (which in 1896 became Princeton University), replacing out-going president James McCosh. His appointment was criticized by some alumni, who noted that Patton was not an American citizen. Some feared he would harangue students with John Knox-style sermons. He won over a large number of the alumni with a speech given in New York in 1888, in which he remarked "I am not prepared to say that it is better to have gone and loafed than never to have gone at all, but I do believe in the genius loci; and I sympathize with Sir Joshua Reynolds when he says, 'that there is around every seminary of learning, an atmosphere of floating knowledge where every one can imbibe something peculiar to his own original conceptions.'" The phrase "Better to have gone and loafed than never to have gone at all" was often quoted by proponents of the so-called "Gentleman's C." Patton was a popular president, and his class in Ethics was one of the most popular on campus.

During Patton's time as university president, Princeton more than doubled in size, growing from 600 students in 1888 to 1,300 students in 1902. Patton appointed many prominent Princeton professors, including: Woodrow Wilson, Bliss Perry, John Grier Hibben, Henry van Dyke, Paul Van Dyke, and Howard C. Warren. Patton announced the name change from "the College of New Jersey" to "Princeton University" in the midst of the ceremonies celebrating the college's Sesquicentennial in 1896. Although Princeton founded a graduate school while Patton was president (in 1900), Patton played little role in the foundation of the graduate school.

In 1891, Dr. Charles A. Briggs, Patton's former co-editor at the Presbyterian Review was appointed the first-ever Professor of Biblical Theology by Union Theological Seminary. In his inaugural lecture, Briggs praised higher criticism, a component of liberal Christianity, and argued that the Scriptures as a whole are riddled with errors and that the doctrine of biblical inerrancy taught at Princeton Theological Seminary "is a ghost of modern evangelicalism to frighten children." Patton was outraged by this lecture and moved that the General Assembly, which had the authority to veto all appointments of professors of theology at Presbyterian seminaries, should exercise this power and remove Briggs from the Union faculty. On Patton's urging, the General Assembly voted to remove Briggs from his position. The faculty of Union Theological Seminary voted to withdraw from the denomination rather than remove Briggs from his chair in order to defend the institution's academic freedom.

Although Patton was popular as an academic, a theologian, and a public speaker, he was not a gifted administrator. In the 1890s, clerical control over Princeton waned, and more and more businessmen and lawyers were elected as Trustees of Princeton University. Dissatisfied with Patton's management of the university, in 1902, the Trustees voted to replace Patton as president, naming Woodrow Wilson as his successor. During his time at Princeton, Patton was elected to the American Philosophical Society (1897).

== President of Princeton Theological Seminary, 1902–1913 ==
Patton thus became president of Princeton Theological Seminary. In that capacity, he opposed Henry van Dyke's proposal to revise the Westminster Confession of Faith.

== Later years, 1913–1932 ==
Patton retired in 1913 and returned to his native Bermuda. He continued to speak out on controversies within the Presbyterian church, and during the Fundamentalist-Modernist Controversy, he supported the Fundamentalist side. He published a book entitled Fundamental Christianity, in which he wrote "We cannot change Christianity. We may reject it if we please, but its meaning is plain".

He died in Hamilton, Bermuda on November 25, 1932.

== Family ==
Patton married Rosa Stevenson on 10 October 1865. They had seven children; their son George became a Member of Parliament in Bermuda.

== Books ==
Patton’s publications include;

- The Inspiration of the Scriptures (1869)
- A Summary of Christian Doctrine (1898)
- Fundamental Christianity (1926)

== Notes ==
Religious titles
Preceded by The Rev. James Eells	Moderator of the 90th General Assembly of the Presbyterian Church in the United States of America; 1878–1879	Succeeded by The Rev. Henry Harris Jessup
Academic offices
Preceded by James McCosh	President of the College of New Jersey; 1888-1896	Name of institution changed
New title Name of institution changed	President of Princeton University; 1896-1902	Succeeded by Woodrow Wilson
Preceded by Benjamin Breckinridge Warfield	President of Princeton Theological Seminary; 1902-1913	Succeeded by J. Ross Stevenson
