= Ned Stonehouse =

American theologian and academic (1902 - 1962)

Ned Bernard Stonehouse
- Born: March 19, 1902; Grand Rapids, Michigan
- Died: November 18, 1962 (aged 60); Glenside, Pennsylvania
- Burial place: Woodlawn Cemetery (Grand Rapids, Michigan)
- Occupation: Professor
- Spouse(s): Winigrace Bylsma (m. 1927; died 1958); Margaret Robinson (m. 1959)

Academic background
- Education: Calvin College (A.B.); Princeton Theological Seminary (Th.B., Th.M.); Free University of Amsterdam (Ph.D.)
- Thesis: The Apocalypse in the Ancient Church: A Study in the History of the New Testament Canon (1929)

Academic work
- Discipline: New Testament criticism

Ned Bernard Stonehouse (March 19, 1902 - November 18, 1962) was a New Testament scholar who taught for over thirty years at Westminster Theological Seminary.

== Early life and education ==
Stonehouse was born in Grand Rapids, Michigan on March 19, 1902.

He received an A.B. from Calvin College (1924), Th.B. and Th.M. degrees from Princeton Theological Seminary (1927), and a Ph.D. from the Free University of Amsterdam (1929), under the supervision of F. W. Grosheide. He also studied at the University of Tubingen.

== Career ==
Stonehouse joined J. Gresham Machen in the founding of Westminster Theological Seminary in 1929, where he worked for over thirty years. He was first ordained as a Presbyterian minister in 1932, and was one of the 34 constituting members of the Orthodox Presbyterian Church in 1936. He also served as moderator of the OPC in 1946, and as president of the Evangelical Theological Society in 1957. In addition, he was editor of The Presbyterian Guardian in 1936-1937, 1945-1948, and 1956-1958.

== Personal life ==
Stonehouse married Winigrace Bylsma in 1927, and together they had one child, Chip Stonehouse. Winigrace died in 1958 and Stonehouse married Margaret Robinson the following year.

== Death ==
Stonehouse died on November 18, 1962 at his home in Glenside, Pennsylvania.

== Books ==
Among his books were the following:

- ——— (1944). The Witness of Matthew and Mark to Christ. Philadelphia, PA: The Presbyterian Guardian. OCLC 03926903.
- ——— (1951). The Witness of Luke to Christ. Grand Rapids, MI: Eerdmans. OCLC 04540689.
- ——— (1954). J. Gresham Machen: A Biographical Memoir. Grand Rapids, MI: Eerdmans. OCLC 01807346.
- ——— (1957). Paul Before the Areopagus, and Other New Testament Studies. Grand Rapids, MI: Eerdmans. OCLC 03916546.
- ——— (1963). Origins of the Synoptic Gospels; Some Basic Questions. Grand Rapids, MI: Eerdmans. OCLC 00804053.

== As editor ==
- Editor (with Paul Woolley), The Infallible Word (1946)
- General editor, New International Commentary on the New Testament (1946-1962)
