= William Park Armstrong =

American theologian and scholar

- Born: January 10, 1874; Selma, Alabama, U.S.
- Died: March 25, 1944 (aged 70); Princeton, New Jersey, U.S.
- Title: Professor New Testament literature and exegesis, Princeton Theological Seminary, 1903-1940

Academic background
- Education: Princeton Theological Seminary

Academic work
- Institutions: Princeton Theological Seminary

William Park Armstrong (January 10, 1874 – March 25, 1944) was a theologian and New Testament scholar who is best known for his work at Princeton Theological Seminary.

== Biography ==
William Park Armstrong was born in Selma, Alabama, the son of William Park and Alice (née Isbell) Armstrong and studied at Princeton University, earning his bachelor's degree at the age of 20. He would later earn his M.A. from Princeton and a B.D. from Princeton Theological Seminary before studying in Europe. He studied at the German Universities of Marburg, Berlin, and Erlangen, before finally finishing his studies at Princeton Theological Seminary. In 1900 he was ordained into the Presbyterian Church (USA). During this time he also taught New Testament at Princeton Theological Seminary, until his death in 1944. During his tenure at Princeton, he wrote numerous scholarly articles and pamphlets. Professor Armstrong also served for many years as a director of City National Bank. Armstrong Drive in Princeton is named in his honor.

== Re-Organization of Princeton Theological Seminary ==
During the 1920s, the northern Presbyterian church (PCUSA) was criticized by some for tolerating increasingly modernist theology. John Gresham Machen, a fellow professor at Princeton, responded by forming the Orthodox Presbyterian Church as a more orthodox alternative. In response, the PCUSA threatened to reorganize the school. Dr. Armstrong was a friend and ally of Dr. Machen, and supported him until Machen's departure to help found the Westminster Theological Seminary.

== Personal ==
He married Rebekah Sellers Purves on December 8, 1904 and went on to have six children.

== Works ==
=== Books ===
- William Park Armstrong, William Park (1904). Witness of the Gospels. OCLC 43770813.
- ——— (1907). Resurrection and the Origin of the Church in Jerusalem.
- ——— (1930). Texts for Gospel History. Princeton, NJ: Princeton Univ. Press. OCLC 6005057.

=== Edited by ===
- ———, ed. (1909). Calvin and the Reformation: four studies by Emile Doumergue, August Lang, Herman Bavinck, and Benjamin B. Warfield. Grand Rapids, MI: Baker Book House. ISBN 9780801029011. OCLC 796948788.
