= Caspar Wistar Hodge Jr. =

American theologian (1870–1937)

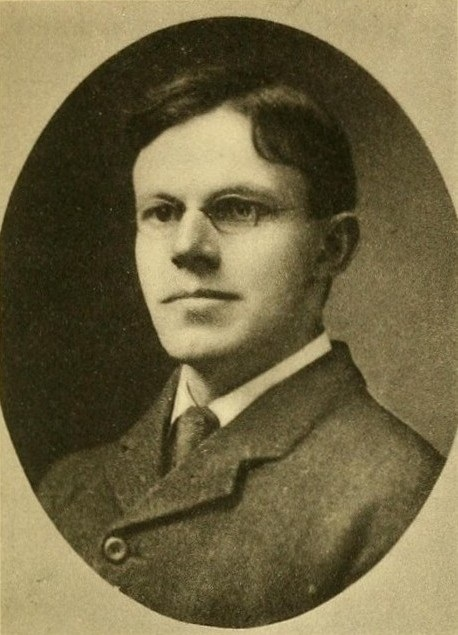
C. Wistar Hodge in 1907

Caspar Wistar Hodge Jr. (September 22, 1870 – February 26, 1937) was an American theologian. He was the son of Caspar Wistar Hodge Sr. and grandson of Charles Hodge, and like both of them, he taught at Princeton Theological Seminary, serving as Professor of Dogmatic Theology from 1915 to 1921 and then as Professor of Systematic Theology from 1921 to 1937.

Hodge was born in Princeton, New Jersey on September 22, 1870. He studied at Princeton University (earning an A.B. degree in 1892 and a Ph.D. degree in 1894), Heidelberg University, the University of Berlin and Princeton Theological Seminary. Hodge taught philosophy at Princeton University and ethics at Lafayette College before coming to the Seminary in 1898. After graduating in 1901, he was ordained as a minister by the Presbytery of New Brunswick in 1902. Hodge joined the seminary theology faculty in 1901, becoming an assistant professor in 1907.

Caspar Wistar Jr. was the last member of the Hodge family to sit on the faculty of Princeton Seminary. He was conferred a D.D. degree by Grove City College in 1935. John Murray said of him,

He had brought to bear upon his exposition and defense of this, the Reformed Faith in its integrity, remarkable carefulness of thought, accuracy of knowledge and breadth of scholarship. It was just such qualities that made him admirably worthy of the great Princeton tradition and placed him in the front rank of the Reformed theologians of this generation.

Hodge married Sarah Henry (1872–1929) in November 1897. They had one daughter, Lucy Maxwell Hodge Ernlund (1902–1977). Hodge died from pneumonia at Princeton Hospital in Princeton on February 26, 1937.
