= Samuel G. Craig =

American football coach (1874–1960)

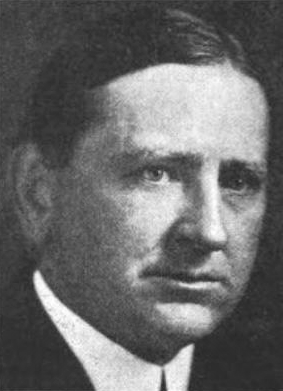

Biographical details
- Born: June 11, 1874; Leland, Illinois, U.S.
- Died: October 7, 1960 (aged 86); Princeton, New Jersey, U.S.

Playing career
- 1896–1898: Princeton
- 1900: Geneva
- Position: End

Coaching career (HC unless noted)
- 1900–1903: Geneva

Head coaching record
- Overall: 26–3–3

Accomplishments and honors

Awards
- Second-team All-American (1897)

Samuel Garfield Craig (June 11, 1874 – October 7, 1960), often referred to as J. B. Craig in the context of Geneva Golden Tornadoes football, was an American minister, author, publisher, and college football player and coach. He served as the head football coach at Geneva College in Beaver Falls, Pennsylvania from 1900 to 1903, compiling a record of 26–3–3. Craig was the director of the Princeton Theological Seminary from 1925 to 1929.

== Early life and education ==
Craig was born on June 11, 1874, in Leland, Illinois. He spent the majority of his childhood in Tarkio, Missouri and attended Tarkio College. Craig moved on to Princeton University, earning a Bachelor of Arts degree in 1895 and a master's degree in 1900. He also earned a bachelor of divinity degree from the Princeton Theological Seminary.

At Princeton, Craig played football for the Princeton Tigers from 1896 to 1898 as an end. He started at left end for the 1897 Princeton Tigers football team's the season finale against Yale.

== Coaching career ==
Craig was ordained as a minister in 1900 and appointed the pastor of the first church in Ebensburg, Pennsylvania. The same year, he was hired to coach the football team at Geneva College in Beaver Falls, Pennsylvania. Craig played at left end in the 1900 Geneva Covenanters football team's victory over Youngstown on October 27 of that year. For the game the following week against Pittsburgh College, Geneva agreed not to use any coaches or paid players on the field. Geneva won the game, played on November 3 at Bluff field in Pittsburgh, by a score of 5 to 0. After the game, Pittsburg College alleged that a substitute named May, who played at left end, was in fact Craig.

Craig continued to coach the Geneva Covenanters football team through the 1903 season, compiling a record of 26–3–3 over four years. Geneva College fans generally consider him among the best coaches in the history of the school.

== Death ==
Craig died on October 7, 1960, at Princeton Hospital, after suffering from uremia.

== Head coaching record ==
Year	Team	Overall	Conference	Standing	Bowl/playoffs
Geneva Covenanters (Independent) (1900–1903)
1900	Geneva	5–1–1			
1901	Geneva	5–1–2			
1902	Geneva	7–0			
1903	Geneva	9–1			
Geneva:		26–3–3			
Total:		26–3–3			
