= Charles Hodge =

Presbyterian theologian (1797–1878)

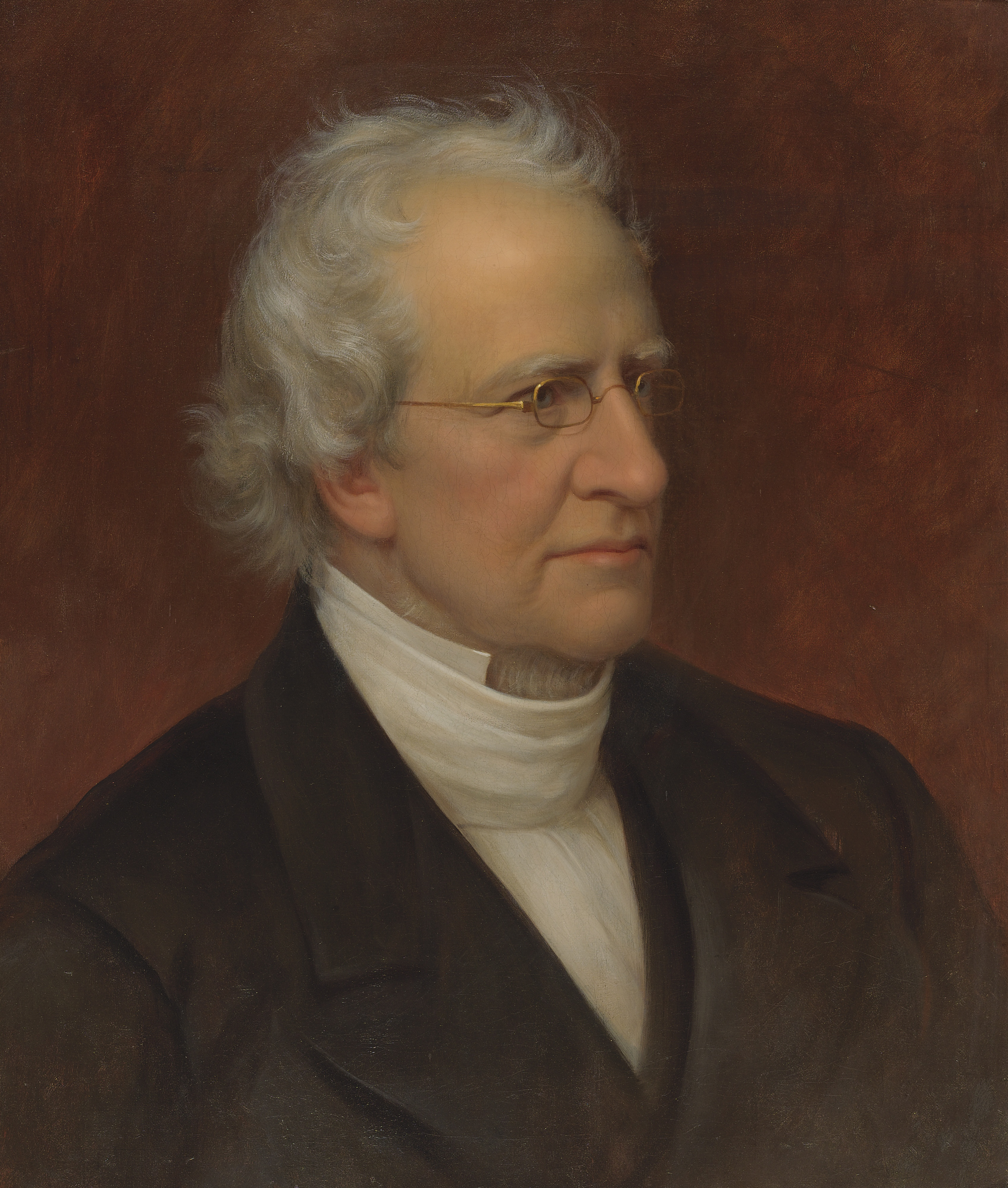
- Hodge, circa 1850–60

2nd Principal of Princeton Theological Seminary
- In office 1851–1878
- Preceded by: Archibald Alexander
- Succeeded by: Archibald Alexander Hodge

Personal details
- Born: December 27, 1797
- Died: June 19, 1878 (aged 80)
- Spouse(s): Sarah Bache (married 1822; died 1849); Mary Hunter Stockman (married 1852)
- Relations: Hugh L. Scott (grandson)
- Children: Archibald Alexander Hodge, Caspar Wistar Hodge Sr.
- Parent(s): Hugh Hodge; Mary Blanchard
- Education: Princeton College; Princeton Theological Seminary

Charles Hodge (December 27, 1797 – June 19, 1878) was a Presbyterian theologian in the area of reformed theology. He was also principal of Princeton Theological Seminary between 1851 and 1878.

He was a leading exponent of the Princeton Theology, an orthodox Reformed and Presbyterian theological tradition in America during the 19th century. He advocated for the authority of the Bible as the Word of God. Many of his ideas were adopted in the 20th century by Fundamentalists and Evangelicals.

== Biography ==
Charles Hodge's father, Hugh, was the son of Andrew Hodge who was a successful international businessman who emigrated from Northern Ireland early in the eighteenth century. Hugh graduated from Princeton College in 1773 and served as a military surgeon in the Revolutionary War, after which he practiced medicine in Philadelphia. Hugh married Bostonian orphan Mary Blanchard, Hodge's mother, in 1790.

Hodge's two brothers died in the Yellow Fever Epidemic of 1793 and another yellow fever epidemic in 1795. Hugh Lenox, Charles' elder brother, was born in 1796 and survived his childhood. Hugh became an authority in obstetrics, maintained a good relationship with Charles and provided financial assistance to him. Charles was born on December 27, 1797. His father died seven months later of complications from the yellow fever he had contracted in the epidemic of 1795. They were brought up by relatives and Mary Hodge. She, with the help of the family's minister Ashbel Green, also provided the customary Presbyterian religious education using the Westminster Shorter Catechism. They moved to Somerville, New Jersey in 1810 in order to attend a classical academy, and again to Princeton in 1812 in order to enter Princeton College, a school originally organized to train Presbyterian ministers. As Charles prepared to enter the college, Princeton Theological Seminary was being established by the Presbyterian Church as a separate institution for training ministers in response to a perceived inadequacy in the training ministers were receiving at the university as well as the perception that the college was drifting from orthodoxy. Also in 1812, Ashbel Green, the Hodge's old minister, became president of the college.

Archibald Alexander, the initial president of Princeton Seminary, offered help to Hodge. He instructed him in Greek and accompanied him on itinerant preaching excursions. Hodge would name his first son after Alexander. Hodge developed close friendships with future Episcopalian bishops John Johns and Charles McIlvaine, as well as future Princeton College president John Mclean. In 1815, amid a period of intense religious fervor among the students inspired by Green and Alexander, Hodge joined the local Presbyterian church and resolved to enter the ministry. He enrolled at the seminary shortly after finishing his undergraduate studies in 1816. The course of study was tough, forcing students to recite scripture in its original languages and employ the dogmatics written in Latin in the 17th century by Reformed scholastic Francis Turretin as a theological textbook. Professors Alexander and Samuel Miller also inculcated an intense piety in their students.

After Hodge graduated from Princeton Seminary in 1819, he privately received additional instruction from Hebrew scholar Rev. Joseph Bates in Philadelphia. He was licensed to preach by the Presbytery of Philadelphia in 1820, and he preached regularly as a missionary in vacant pulpits in the East Falls neighborhood of Philadelphia, the Frankford Arsenal in Philadelphia, and Woodbury, New Jersey over the subsequent months. In 1820 he accepted a one-year appointment as assistant professor at Princeton Seminary to teach biblical languages. In October of that year he traveled throughout New England to speak with professors and ministers including Moses Stuart at Andover Seminary and Nathaniel W. Taylor at Yale Divinity School. In 1821 he was ordained a minister by the Presbytery of New Brunswick, and in 1822 he published his first pamphlet, which allowed Alexander to convince the General Assembly to appoint him full Professor of Oriental and Biblical Literature. Now financially stable, Hodge married Sarah Bache, Benjamin Franklin's great-granddaughter in the same year. In 1824, Hodge helped to found the Chi Phi Society along with Robert Baird and Archibald Alexander. He founded the quarterly Biblical Repertory in 1825 to translate the current scholarly literature on the Bible from Europe.

Hodge's study of European scholarship led him to question the adequacy of his training. The seminary agreed to continue to pay him for two years while he traveled in Europe to "round out" his education. He supplied a substitute, John Nevin on his own expense. From 1826 to 1828 he traveled to Paris, where he studied French, Arabic, and Syriac; Halle, where he studied German with George Müller and made the acquaintance of August Tholuck; and Berlin where he attended the lectures of Silvestre de Sacy, Ernst Wilhelm Hengstenberg, and August Neander. There he also became personally acquainted with Friedrich Schleiermacher, a leading modern theologian. He admired the deep scholarship he witnessed in Germany, but thought that the attention given to idealist philosophy clouded common sense, and led to speculative and subjective theology. Unlike other American theologians who spent time in Europe, Hodge's experience did not cause any change in his commitment to the principles of the faith he had learned from childhood.

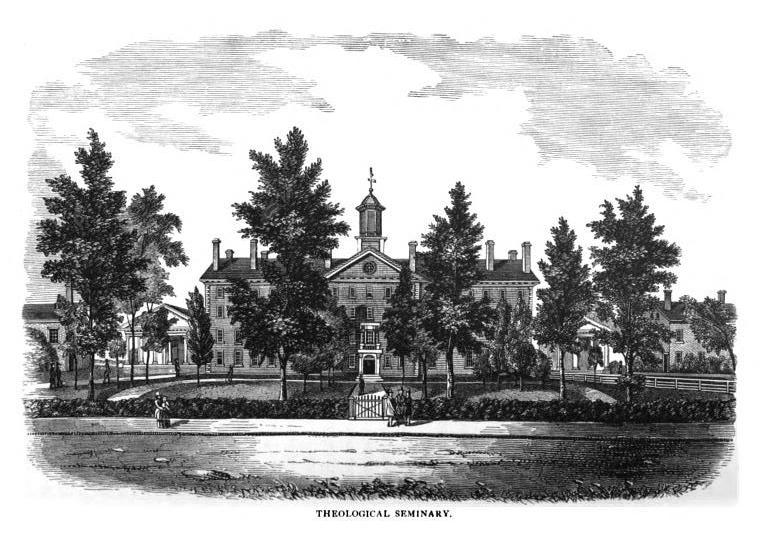
Princeton Seminary in the 1800s

In 1833, Hodge suffered severe leg pain and lost the use of his limbs. He continued to write articles for Biblical Repertory, now renamed the Princeton Review. During the 1830s he wrote a major commentary on Romans and a history of the Presbyterian church in America. He supported the Old School in the Old School–New School Controversy, which resulted in a split in 1837. In 1840 he became Professor of Didactic Theology, retaining, however, the department of New Testament exegesis, the duties of which he continued to discharge until his death. He was moderator of the General Assembly of the Presbyterian Church in the United States of America (Old School) in 1846. Hodge's wife died in 1849, shortly followed by Samuel Miller and Archibald Alexander, leaving him the senior professor of the seminary. He was recognized as the leading proponent of the Princeton theology. On his death in 1878 he was recognized by both friends and opponents as one of the greatest polemicists of his time.

== Family ==
He married Sarah Bache, Benjamin Franklin’s great-granddaughter, in 1822 and they had eight children. When she died in 1849, he married Mary Stockton, who was one of Sarah’s friends.

Of his children who survived him, three were ministers; and two of these succeeded him in the faculty of Princeton Theological Seminary, C. W. Hodge, in the department of exegetical theology, and A. A. Hodge, in that of dogmatics. A grandson, C. W. Hodge, Jr., also taught for many years at Princeton Seminary.

== Literary and teaching activities ==
Hodge wrote many biblical and theological works. He began writing early in his theological career and continued publishing until his death. In 1835 he published his Commentary on the Epistle to the Romans. Although considered to be his greatest exegetical work, Hodge revised this commentary in 1864, in the midst of the American Civil War, and after a debate with James Henley Thornwell about state secession from the Union.

Other works followed at intervals of longer or shorter duration – Constitutional History of the Presbyterian Church in the United States (1840); Way of Life (1841, republished in England, translated into other languages, and circulated to the extent of 35,000 copies in America); Commentary on Ephesians (1856); on First Corinthians (1857); on Second Corinthians (1859). His magnum opus is the Systematic Theology (1871–1873), of 3 volumes and extending to 2,260 pages. His last book, What is Darwinism? appeared in 1874. In addition, he contributed upward of 130 articles to the Princeton Review, many of which, besides exerting a powerful influence at the time of their publication, have since been gathered into volumes, and as Selection of Essays and Reviews from the Princeton Review (1857) and Discussions in Church Polity (ed. W. Durant, 1878) have taken a permanent place in theological literature. All of the books that he authored have remained in print over a century after his death.

Hodge achieved distinction as a teacher, exegete, preacher, controversialist, ecclesiastic and systematic theologian, and 3,000 ministers of the Gospel underwent his instruction.

Hodge made contributions to the Princeton Theological Review. They cover a wide range of topics, from apologetic questions that concern common Christianity to questions of ecclesiastical administration, in which only Presbyterians were supposed to take interest. But the questions in debate among American theologians during the period covered by Hodge's life belonged, for the most part, to the departments of anthropology and soteriology; and it was these, accordingly, that his polemics mainly concerned.

== Character and significance ==
Devotion to Christ was the salient characteristic of his experience, and it was the test by which he judged the experience of others. Hence, though a Presbyterian and a Calvinist, his sympathies went far beyond the boundaries of sect. He refused to entertain the narrow views of church polity which some of his brethren advocated. He repudiated those who denied the validity of Roman Catholic baptism. Those who knew him well described him as "luminous with the spirit of the indwelling Christ," as well as his "devout, reverent, sincere, fearless, intensely earnest, and honest" personality. People agreed that his "genuine kindliness of heart and largeness of soul" contradicted Calvinist notions of strictness and severity. Others described him as "the sweetest, gentlest, and most lovable of men." His face alone was a blessing." William Green, Hodge's colleague, recalled people who had known him of his "cheerful affability, rising at times into hilarity."

He was conservative by nature, and his life was spent in defending the Reformed theology as set forth in the Westminster Confession of Faith and Larger and Westminster Shorter Catechisms. He was fond of saying that Princeton had never originated a new idea; but this meant no more than that Princeton was the advocate of historical Calvinism in opposition to the modified and provincial Calvinism of a later day. Hodge is classed among the great defenders of the faith, rather than among the great constructive minds of the Church. He had no ambition to be epoch-making by marking the era of a new departure. But he earned a higher title to fame in that he was the champion of his Church's faith during a long and active life, her trusted leader in time of trial, and for more than half a century the most conspicuous teacher of her ministry.

Hodges' understanding of the Christian faith and of historical Protestantism is given in his Systematic Theology; this was published in 1871 and became a primary text at Princeton Seminary.

== Views on controversial topics ==
=== Slavery ===
Hodge supported the institution of slavery in its most abstract sense, as having support from certain passages in the Bible. He held slaves himself, but he condemned their mistreatment, and made a distinction between slavery in the abstract and what he saw as the unjust Southern Slave Laws that deprived slaves of their right to educational instruction, to marital and parental rights, and that "subject them to the insults and oppression of the whites." It was his opinion that the humanitarian reform of these laws would become the necessary prelude to the eventual end of slavery in the United States.

The Presbyterian General Assembly of 1818 had affirmed a similar position, that slavery within the United States, while not necessarily sinful, was a regrettable institution that ought to eventually be changed. Like the church, Hodge himself had sympathies with both the abolitionists in the North and the pro-slavery advocates in the South, and he used his considerable influence in an attempt to restore order and find common ground between the two factions, with the eventual hope of abolishing slavery altogether.

Hodge's support of slavery was not an inevitable result of his belief in the inerrancy and the literal interpretation of the Bible. Other 19th century Christian contemporaries of Hodge, who also believed in the inerrancy and infallibility of the Bible, denounced the institution of slavery. John Williamson Nevin, a conservative, evangelical Reformed scholar and seminary professor, denounced slavery as 'a vast moral evil.' Hodge and Nevin also famously clashed over polar-opposite views of the Lord's Supper.

=== Old School ===
Hodge was a leader of the Old School faction of Presbyterians during the division of the Presbyterian Church (USA) in 1837. The issues involved conflicts over doctrine, religious practice, and slavery. Although prior to 1861 the Old School refrained from denouncing slavery, the issue was a matter of debate between Northern and Southern components of the denomination.

=== Civil War ===
Hodge held a resistant opinion to the Civil War in 1861. Hodge was a strong nationalist and led the fight among Presbyterians to support the Union. In the January 1861 Princeton Review, Hodge laid out his case against secession, in the end calling it unconstitutional. James Henley Thornwell responded in the January 1861 Southern Presbyterian Review, holding that the election of 1860 had installed a new government, one which the South did not agree with, thus making secession lawful. Despite being a staunch Unionist politically, Hodge voted against the support for the "Spring Resolutions" of the 1861 General Assembly of the Old School Presbyterian Church, thinking it was not the business of the church to involve itself in political matters; because of the resolutions, the denomination then split North and South. When the General Assembly convened in Philadelphia in May 1861, one month after the Civil War began, the resolution stipulated pledging support for the federal government over objections based on concerns about the scope of church jurisdiction and disagreements about its interpretation of the Constitution. In December 1861, the Southern Old School Presbyterian churches severed ties with the denomination.

=== Darwinism ===
In 1874, Hodge published What is Darwinism?, claiming that Darwinism, was, in essence, atheism. To Hodge, Darwinism was contrary to the notion of design and was therefore clearly atheistic. Both in the Review and in What is Darwinism?, (1874) Hodge attacked Darwinism. His views determined the position of the Seminary until his death in 1878. While he didn't consider all evolutionary ideas to be in conflict with his religion, he was concerned with its teaching in colleges. Meanwhile, at Princeton University, a totally separate institution, President John Maclean also rejected Darwin's theory of evolution. However, in 1868, upon Maclean's retirement, James McCosh, a Scottish philosopher, became president. McCosh believed that much of Darwinism could and would be proved sound, and so he strove to prepare Christians for this event. Instead of conflict between science and religion, McCosh sought reconciliation. Insisting on the principle of design in nature, McCosh interpreted the Darwinian discoveries as more evidence of the prearrangement, skill, and purpose in the universe. He thus argued that Darwinism was not atheistic nor in irreconcilable hostility to the Bible. The Presbyterians in America thus could choose between two schools of thought on evolution, both based in Princeton. The Seminary held to Hodge's position until his supporters were ousted in 1929, and the college (Princeton University) became a world class center of the new science of evolutionary biology.

The debate between Hodge and McCosh exemplified an emerging conflict between science and religion over the question of Darwin's evolution theory. However, the two men showed greater similarities regarding matters of science and religion than popularly appreciated. Both supported the increasing role of scientific inquiry in natural history and resisted its intrusion into philosophy and religion.

=== The nature of God ===
Charles Hodge was often critical of the traditional understanding of divine simplicity, instead teaching a more moderate form of simplicity. He argued that the views of simplicity taught by Augustine, Aquinas and Scotus "destroy any true knowledge of God". Charles Hodge also rejected the traditional notion of divine impassibility, rejecting traditional notions that God's love is not to be understood as a feeling. He however affirmed the doctrine of eternal generation, as taught by the Council of Nicaea.

== Works ==
=== Books ===
- Hodge, Charles (1837). A commentary on the Epistle to the Romans. London: The Religious tract society. pp. xvi, 438 p. LCCN 38018206. LCC BS2665 .H65 1837.
- ——— (1990) [1839–1840]. The constitutional history of the Presbyterian church in the United States of America. Philadelphia: W.S. Martien. ISBN 9780790551555. LCCN 42027085. OCLC 390536. LCC BX8936 .H6 1839.
- ——— (c. 1841). The way of life. Philadelphia: American Sunday-school Union. pp. xi, [13]–384 p. LCCN 33024805. OCLC 6956164. OL 23358725M. LCC BV4531 .H55 1840.
- ——— (1856). A commentary on the Epistle to the Ephesians. New York: R. Carter and brothers. pp. xx, [21]–398 p. LCCN 40015255. OCLC 2517813. LCC BS2695 .H65. - There is an 1860 reprint available through MOA http://quod.lib.umich.edu/m/moa/AJH0374.0001.001/1 (not in the public domain)
- ——— (1857). An exposition of the First epistle to the Corinthians. New York: R. Carter. pp. xxi, 373 p., 20 cm. LCCN 40015256. LCC BS2675 .H6 Dewey: 227.2.
- ——— (1860). An exposition of the Second epistle to the Corinthians. New York: R. Carter & brothers. pp. 1 p.l., 314 p. 20 cm. LCCN 40015257. LCC BS2675 .H65.
- ——— (1872–1873). Systematic theology. New York, London and Edinburgh: C. Scribner and company, T. Nelson and sons. pp. 3 v. 25 cm. LCCN 45041149. LCC BT75 .H63.
- ——— (1873). "Introduction". In Ramsey, James Beverlin (ed.). The spiritual kingdom: an exposition of the first eleven chapters of the book of the Revelation. Richmond, Va.: Presbyterian Committee of Publication. pp. i–xxxv. LCCN 40016574. OL 23339154M. LCC BS2825 .R35 Dewey: 228.
- ——— (n.d.). Lectures (on Theology) (Manuscript). LCCN mm81026179. LCC MMC-2873.
- ——— (1874). What is Darwinism?. New York: Scribner, Armstrong, and company. pp. iv, 178 p. 20 cm. LCCN 06012878. LCC QH369 .H63.

=== Journals ===
- ———; Atwater, Lyman Hotchkiss &; Smith, Henry Boynton; Sherwood, James Manning (J. M.); Libbey, Jonas M. & Forsyth, John, eds. (1825–1888). The Princeton review (Journal). New York: G. & C. Carvill [etc., etc.] LCCN 01026485. LCC BR1 .P7.
- ———, ed. (1825–1829). "N/A". Biblical repertory (Journal). 1 – v. 5. Princeton, N.J.: Princeton Press. LCCN sf89090823. OCLC 08840509. LCC Microfilm 01104 no.229, 566-567 AP.

=== Sermons ===
- ——— (1833). A sermon, preached in Philadelphia ... American Sunday-school Union, May 31, 1832. Philadelphia: The Union. LCCN 96229925. LCC YA 30459 YA Pam.

=== Articles ===
- ——— (January 1871). "Preaching the Gospel to the Poor". The Princeton Review. 43 (1). New York: G. & C. Carvill: 83–95.
- ——— (April 1876). "Christianity without Christ". The Princeton Review. 5 (18). New York: G. & C. Carvill: 352–362.
- ——— (1855), What is Presbyterianism?

=== Modern reprints ===
- Systematic Theology. Hendrickson Publishers (1999). ISBN 1-56563-459-4 (also available abridged by Edward N. Gross, ISBN 0-87552-224-6)
- Romans (The Crossway Classic Commentaries). Crossway Books (1994). ISBN 0-89107-724-3
- Romans (Geneva Series of Commentaries). Banner of Truth (June 1, 1998). ISBN 0-8515-1213-5
- Corinthians (Crossway Classic Commentaries). Crossway Books (1995). ISBN 0-89107-867-3
- 1 & 2 Corinthians (Geneva Series of Commentaries). Banner of Truth (June 1, 1998). ISBN 0-8515-1185-6
- 2 Corinthians (Crossway Classic Commentaries). Crossway Books (1995). ISBN 0-89107-868-1
- Ephesians (The Crossway Classic Commentaries). Crossway Books (1994). ISBN 0-89107-784-7
- Ephesians (Geneva Series of Commentaries). Banner of Truth (June 1, 1998). ISBN 0-8515-1591-6
- The Way of Life (Sources of American Spirituality). Mark A. Noll, ed. Paulist Press (1987). ISBN 0-8091-0392-3

== Sources ==
- Noll, Mark A. (1987). "Introduction". In Noll, Mark A. (ed.). Charles Hodge: The Way of Life. Sources of American Spirituality. New York: Paulist Press. Archived from the original on April 8, 2016.

This article includes content derived from the public domain Schaff-Herzog Encyclopedia of Religious Knowledge, 1914.

Academic offices
Preceded by Archibald Alexander	Principal of Princeton Theological Seminary; 1851–1878	Succeeded by Archibald Alexander Hodge
Religious titles
Preceded by The Rev. John Michael Krebs	Moderator of the 58th General Assembly of the Presbyterian Church in the United States of America (Old School); 1846–1847	Succeeded by The Rev. James Henley Thornwell
