= The Princeton Theological Review =

Academic theological journal

- Discipline: Theology
- Language: English

Publication details
- Former names: Biblical Repertory, Biblical Repertory and Theological Review, Biblical Repertory and Princeton Review, Presbyterian Quarterly and Princeton Review, The Princeton Review, The Presbyterian Review, The New Princeton Review, The Presbyterian and Reformed Review
- History: 1825–1929; 1990s–2012; 2014–2020.
- Publisher: Princeton Theological Seminary (United States)
- Frequency: Biannually or annually
- Open access: Yes

Standard abbreviations
- ISO 4: Princet. Theol. Rev.

Indexing
- ISSN: 1945-4813
- LCCN: 31004597
- OCLC no.: 1762859

Links
- Journal homepage; Online access; Online archive

The Princeton Theological Review is an annual academic journal published by students of Princeton Theological Seminary. It was first published with the title Biblical Repertory in 1825 by the Princeton Seminary graduate and professor, Charles Hodge. The name was changed to Biblical Repertory and Theological Review in 1829, Biblical Repertory and Princeton Review in 1837, Presbyterian Quarterly and Princeton Review in 1872, The Princeton Review in 1878, The Presbyterian Review in 1880, The New Princeton Review in 1886, The Presbyterian and Reformed Review in 1890, and finally Princeton Theological Review in 1903. In 1929 the trustees of Princeton Theological Seminary discontinued its subsidization. It was revived in the mid 1990s as The Princeton Theological Review. It again went dormant in 2012 but was revitalized in the 2014–2015 academic year before returning to domancy in 2020.
