= Paul Woolley (historian) =

American historian (1902–1984)

Paul Woolley (16 March 1902 – 17 March 1984) was an American pastor and professor.

== Biography ==
Born 16 March 1902, to a pastor of the Moody Church in Chicago, Woolley grew up in The Plains, Ohio. During a visit to Germany, in preparation to visit China as a missionary, he married a Russian countess. Along with J. Gresham Machen, he was a minister of the Presbyterian Church in the United States of America, but they were suspended following its split, with them—alongside others—organizing the Orthodox Presbyterian Church in 1936.

Woolley was a professor of Church history at Westminster Theological Seminary from its inception in 1929 until his retirement in 1977. In 1982, a Festschrift was published in his honor. John Calvin: His Influence in the Western World included essays by W. Stanford Reid, W. Robert Godfrey, Philip Edgcumbe Hughes, R. T. Kendall, George M. Marsden, and C. Gregg Singer.

Woolley had two children. He died on 17 March 1984, aged 82, at OhioHealth O'Bleness Hospital, in Athens.

The Paul Woolley Chair of Church History at Westminster Theological Seminary is named in his honor.
