= Archibald Alexander Hodge =

American Presbyterian leader (1823–1886)

The Reverend Archibald Alexander Hodge
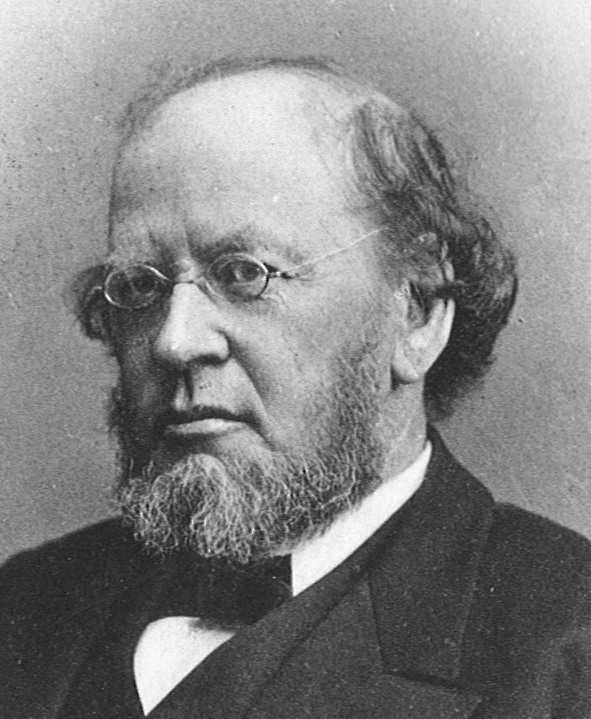
- Hodge circa 1860-1870

3rd Principal of Princeton Theological Seminary
- In office 1878–1886
- Preceded by: Charles Hodge
- Succeeded by: Benjamin Breckinridge Warfield

Personal details
- Born: July 18, 1823 Princeton, New Jersey, U.S.
- Died: November 12, 1886 (aged 63) Princeton, New Jersey, U.S.
- Spouses: Elizabeth Bent Holliday (m. 1847) Margaret (McLaren) Woods (m. 1862)
- Children: Sarah Bache Hodge (1848–1921); Elizabeth Holliday Hodge (1849–1893)
- Parent(s): Charles Hodge, Sarah Bache
- Education: Princeton College; Princeton Theological Seminary
- Occupation: Professor, minister

Archibald Alexander Hodge (July 18, 1823 – November 12, 1886), an American Presbyterian minister, was the principal of Princeton Seminary between 1878 and 1886.

== Biography ==
He was born on July 18, 1823, to Sarah and Charles Hodge in Princeton, New Jersey. He was named after Charles' mentor, the first principal of Princeton Seminary, Archibald Alexander.

Hodge attended the College of New Jersey (later Princeton University) in 1841 and then Princeton Theological Seminary in 1847.

He served as a missionary in India for three years (1847–1850). He held pastorates at Lower West Nottingham, Maryland (1851–1855), Fredericksburg, Virginia (1855–1861), and Wilkes-Barre, Pennsylvania (1861–1864). In 1864 he accepted a call to the chair of systematic theology in Western Theological Seminary (later Pittsburgh Theological Seminary) in Pittsburgh, Pennsylvania. There he remained until in 1877 he was called to Princeton to be the associate of his father, Charles Hodge, in the distinguished chair of systematic theology. He took on the full responsibilities of the chair of systematic theology in 1878.

He died on November 12, 1886, in Princeton, New Jersey, from "a severe cold ... which settled in his kidneys".

== Influence ==
At the time of his death, he was a trustee of the College of New Jersey and a leader in the Presbyterian Church. His interests extended beyond religion. He touched the religious world at many points. During the years immediately preceding his death he did not slacken his work, but continued his work of writing, preaching, lecturing, making addresses, coming into contact with men, influencing them, and by doing so widening the influence of Christianity. Among the most influential was an article titled Inspiration that began a series in the Presbyterian Review which established the discipline of biblical theology as a historical science. This article was coauthored with B. B. Warfield in 1880.

== Characteristics ==
Hodge's distinguishing characteristic as a theologian was his power as a thinker. He had a mind of singular acuteness, and though never a professed student of metaphysics, he was essentially and by nature a metaphysician. His theology was that of the Reformed confessions. He had no peculiar views and no peculiar method of organizing theological dogmas; in this he may be identified with his father, who claimed at the end of his life that he had taught and written nothing new. Though he taught the same theology that his father had taught before him, he was independent as well as reverent. His first book and that by which he is best known was his Outlines of Theology (New York City, 1860; enlarged ed., 1878; reprinted 1996, ISBN 0-85151-160-0), which was translated into Welsh, modern Greek, and Hindustani. The Atonement (Philadelphia, 1867; reprinted 1989, ISBN 0-685-26838-1) is still one of the best treatises on the subject. This was followed by his commentary on the Westminster Confession of Faith (1869, ISBN 0-8370-0932-4), a very useful book, full of clear thinking and compact statement. He contributed some important articles to encyclopedias – Johnson's, McClintock and Strong's, and the Schaff-Herzog (the Schaff-Herzog encyclopedia furnished the kernel from which this article developed). He was one of the founders of the Presbyterian Review, to the pages of which he was a frequent contributor.

== Sermons ==
In the pulpit, Hodge had few sermons, and he preached them frequently. They were never written nor deliberately planned. They grew from small beginnings and, as he went through the process of thinking them over as often as he preached them, they gradually became more elaborate.

== Publications ==
- The Rule of Faith and Practice
- The Protestant rule of faith
- The Rules of Interpreting Scripture
- The Holy Scriptures - Canon and Inspiration (Part 1) (Part 2)
- The Inspiration of the Bible
- Commentary on the Westminster Confession of Faith
- God - His Nature And Relation To The Universe
- Assurance and Humility
- A Short History of Creeds and Confessions
- God's Covenants With Man--The Church
- Baptism
- The Mode of Baptism
- Sanctification (revised by B.B. Warfield)
- Free Will
- Outlines of Theology
- Justification (Part 1) (Part 2) (Part 3)
- Predestination
- Selected Essays by Archibald Alexander Hodge
- A commentary on the Confession of Faith : with questions for theological students and Bible classes
  - (1869) https://archive.org/details/commentaryonconf00hodguoft (Robarts - University of Toronto)
  - (1869) https://archive.org/details/acommentaryonthe00hodguoft (Knox - University of Toronto)
  - (1869) https://archive.org/details/commentaryonconf00hodg (Princeton Theological Seminary Library)
  - (1901 printing) https://archive.org/details/commentaryonconf1901hodg (Princeton Theological Seminary Library)
- A commentary on the confession of faith [of the Assembly of divines] ed. by W.H. Goold (1870)
  - https://archive.org/details/acommentaryonco00hodggoog (Oxford University)
- Comentario de la Confesion de fe de Westminster de la Iglesia Presbiteriana (1897)
  - https://archive.org/details/comentariodelaco00hodg (Princeton Theological Seminary Library)
- The atonement (1867)
  - (1867) https://archive.org/details/theatonement00hodguoft (Trinity College - University of Toronto)
  - (1867) https://archive.org/details/atonement00hodguoft (Robarts - University of Toronto)
  - (1867) https://archive.org/details/atonement00publgoog (New York Public Library)
  - (1867) https://archive.org/details/atonement00hodg (New York Public Library)
- Outlines of theology
  - (1860) https://archive.org/details/outlinesoftheolo1860hodg (Princeton Theological Seminary Library)
  - (1861) https://archive.org/details/outlinesoftheolo00hodg (Princeton Theological Seminary Library)
  - (1863) https://archive.org/details/outlinestheolog03hodggoog (Harvard University)
  - (1863) (ed. by W.H. Goold) https://archive.org/details/outlinestheolog01hodggoog (Oxford University)
  - (1865) https://archive.org/details/outlinesoftheolo1865hodg (Princeton Theological Seminary Library)
  - (1866) https://archive.org/details/outlinestheolog02hodggoog (unknown library)
  - (1876) https://archive.org/details/outlinesoftheo00hodg (New York Public Library)
  - (1877) https://archive.org/details/outlinesoftheolo00hodguoft (Emmanuel - University of Toronto)
  - (1878) https://archive.org/details/outlinesoftheolo1878hodg (Princeton Theological Seminary Library)
  - (1879) https://archive.org/details/outlinesoftheolo1879hodg (Princeton Theological Seminary Library)
  - (1879) (ed. by W.H. Goold) https://archive.org/details/outlinestheolog00hodggoog (Oxford University)
  - There is also a companion to this book by William Passmore (1873)A compendium of evangelical theology given in the words of holy Scripture https://archive.org/details/acompendiumevan00unkngoog
- The life of Charles Hodge ... professor in the Theological seminary, Princeton, N.J. (1880)
  - https://archive.org/details/lifeofcharleshodg00hodg (Princeton Theological Seminary Library)
  - https://archive.org/details/lifeofcharleshod00hodg0 (Princeton Theological Seminary Library)
  - https://archive.org/details/lifeofcharlesh00hodg (Princeton Theological Seminary Library)
  - https://archive.org/details/lifeofcharleshod00hodgrich (University of California Libraries)
  - https://archive.org/details/lifecharleshodg01hodggoog (University of California)
  - https://archive.org/details/lifecharleshodg02hodggoog (New York Public Library)
  - (1881) https://archive.org/details/lifecharleshodg00hodggoog (Oxford University)
- Popular lectures on theological themes (1887)
  - https://archive.org/details/popularlectures00hodggoog
  - https://archive.org/details/popularlectures00publgoog
  - https://archive.org/details/popularlectures00hodguoft
  - https://archive.org/details/popularlectureso00hodg
- Inspiration (1881) (Reprinted from the Presbyterian review, April, 1881) https://archive.org/details/inspiration00hodg (Princeton Theological Seminary Library)
- Westminster doctrine anent holy scripture : tractates by professors A. A. Hodge and Warfield (1891)
  - https://archive.org/details/westminsterdoct00howi (Princeton Theological Seminary Library)
- Manual of forms for baptism, admission to the communion, administration of the Lord's Supper, marriage and funerals : conformed to the doctrine and discipline of the Presbyterian Church (1877)
  - https://archive.org/details/manualofformsfor00hodg
  - https://archive.org/details/manualofforms00hodg
  - (1882 copyright, 1883 published) https://archive.org/details/manualofforms00hodguoft (Emmanuel - University of Toronto)
- The system of theology contained in the Westminster shorter catechism opened and explained (1888) https://archive.org/details/systemoftheology00hodg
- Questions on the text of the Systematic Theology of Dr. Charles Hodge : together with an exhibition of various schemes illustrating the principles of theological construction (by A. A. Hodge)(1885)
  - https://archive.org/details/questionsontexto00hodg (Princeton Theological Seminary Library)
- Address at the funeral of the Rev. Henry Augustus Boardman, D.D. (1881)
  - https://archive.org/details/addressatfuneral00hodg (Princeton Theological Seminary Library)
- Van Dyke, Joseph Smith (1886) Theism and evolution : an examination of modern speculative theories as related to theistic conceptions of the universe. With an introduction by d Alexander Hodge
  - https://archive.org/details/theismandevolut00vanduoft (Trinity College - University of Toronto)
  - https://archive.org/details/theismevolutione00vand (Princeton Theological Seminary Library)

=== Articles ===
- Hodge, Archibald Alexander (1878). "The Ordo Salutis". The Princeton Review. 1: 304–321.
- Hodge, Archibald Alexander (March 1886). "Open Letters: Christian Union". The Century; A Popular Quarterly. 31 (5): 798–801. Archived from the original on October 31, 2022.
- Hodge, Archibald Alexander (December 1883). "Morality and Religion". The North American Review. 137 (325). Archived from the original on October 31, 2022.

Academic offices
Preceded by Charles Hodge	Principal of Princeton Theological Seminary; 1878–1886	Succeeded by Benjamin Breckinridge Warfield
