= Eco bible =

2020/2021 commentary on the Hebrew Bible

Eco Bible
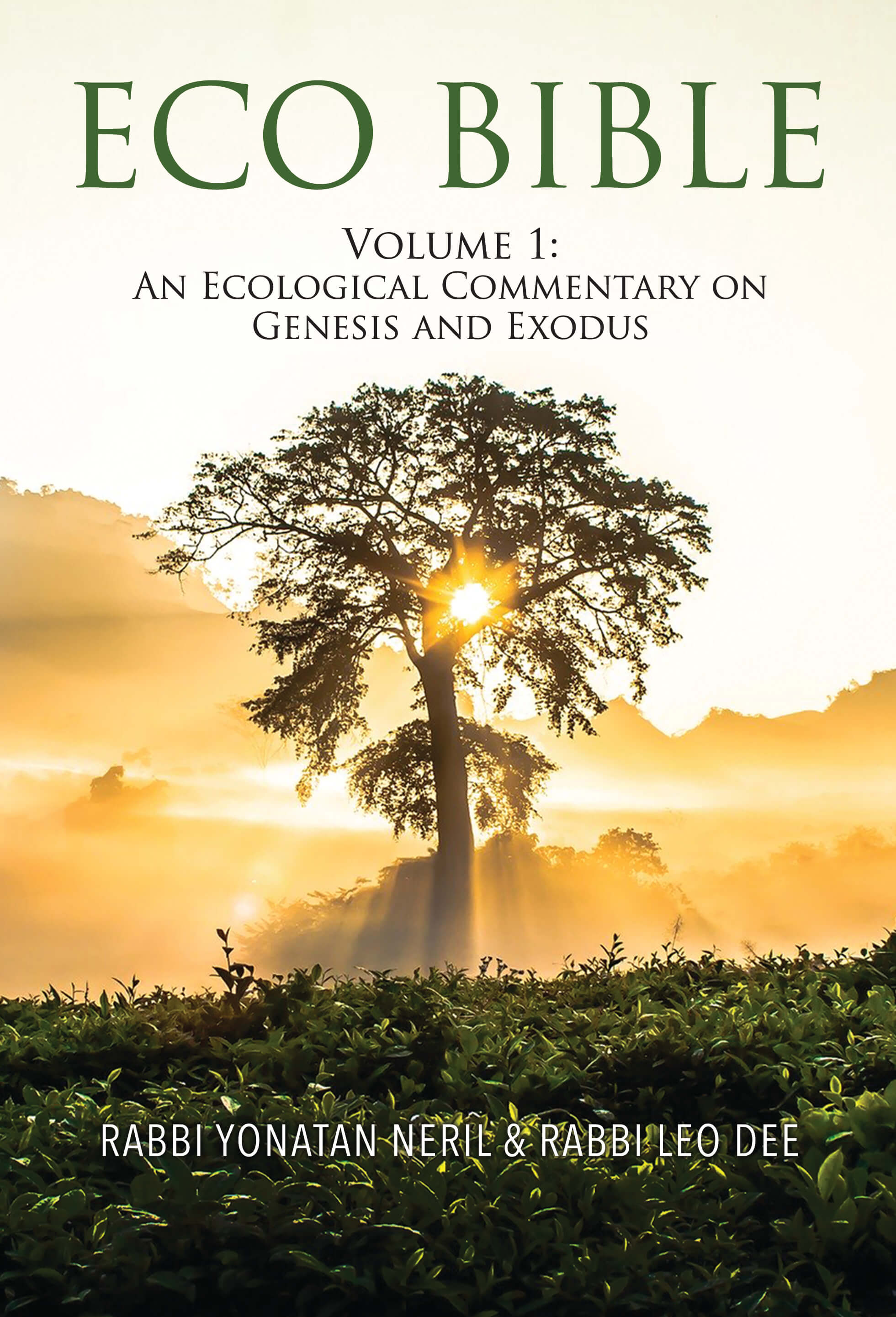
- Volume one, front cover
- Volume I (Genesis and Exodus); Volume II (Leviticus, Numbers, and Deuteronomy)
- Author: Rabbi Yonatan Neril, Rabbi Leo Dee
- Language: English
- Discipline: Religious Studies, Environmental Studies
- Publisher: Interfaith Center for Sustainable Development (ICSD)
- Published: 2020 (Volume I), 2021 (Volume II)
- Media type: Print, Digital
- No. of books: 2

Eco Bible is a two-volume ecological commentary on the Hebrew Bible (Torah), co-authored by Rabbi Yonatan Neril and Rabbi Leo Dee. Eco Bible was published by the Interfaith Center for Sustainable Development (ICSD). Volume one, on Genesis and Exodus, was published in 2020. Volume two, on Leviticus, Numbers, and Deuteronomy, was published in 2021. The authors describe the Eco Bible as integrating traditional Jewish teachings with contemporary environmental science. The commentary encourages religious communities to consider environmental activism and sustainability through interpretations of Jewish scriptures.

== Background and purpose ==
Eco Bible was developed in response to increased interest in the intersection of religious teachings and environmental concerns. The book was co-authored by Rabbi Yonatan Neril, founder of the Interfaith Center for Sustainable Development (ICSD), and Rabbi Leo Dee. It explores interpretations of 400 verses in the Pentateuch that relate to ecological sustainability, aiming to connect traditional Jewish teachings with contemporary environmental challenges. The work reflects an effort to engage religious communities in environmental discourse by examining biblical texts through an ecological perspective.

=== Interpretive sources and methodology ===
The commentary draws from over 100 Jewish thinkers, including Maimonides and Rabbi Jonathan Sacks, to support its interpretations and link biblical wisdom with contemporary environmental challenges such as climate change, pollution, and biodiversity loss. Each section of Eco Bible includes insights from Jewish scholars, rabbis, and environmentalists, blending theological analysis with scientific perspectives to promote a holistic view of sustainability.

== Volumes ==
=== Volume I: Genesis and Exodus ===
This volume provides commentary on the books of Genesis and Exodus, emphasizing themes such as the intrinsic value of creation, human responsibility toward the Earth, and sustainable living. It highlights how the texts address environmental ethics, the human role in creation, and the relationship between humankind and the natural world. For example, Genesis 2:15, which describes Adam being placed in the Garden of Eden "to work it and guard it," underscores humanity's dual role as caretakers and users of nature. This volume also explores ecological messages such as the significance of crop diversification, derived from Exodus 9:31–32.

=== Volume II: Leviticus, Numbers, and Deuteronomy ===
The second volume continues the exploration with a focus on Leviticus, Numbers, and Deuteronomy. It examines laws and commandments related to agriculture, animal welfare, and land use. It addresses topics like land management, ethical consumption, and the sustainable use of resources, connecting ancient teachings to modern ecological concerns.

== Reviews ==
Publishers Weekly described the book as an insightful analysis that "will inspire contemplation on how to live in harmony with nature."

In a review for The Jewish Chronicle, Rabbi Jonathan Wittenberg described Eco Bible as a work that combines rabbinic teachings with contemporary environmental concerns. He noted that the commentary integrates spiritual insights with references to current climate science, and characterized it as a resource aimed at encouraging readers to reconsider their relationship with the natural world.

In an academic review for Homiletic, Rabbi Yonatan Neril and Rabbi Leo Dee's work was noted for its innovative exegetical approach, integrating traditional Jewish sources with ecological imperatives. The reviewer emphasized its potential usefulness for preachers and educators seeking to incorporate environmental themes into sermons and teachings.

The Evangelical and Ecumenical Women’s Caucus described the book as a compelling resource that bridges faith and environmental responsibility, commending its use of scriptural interpretation to advocate for sustainable living. The review highlighted the book's accessibility and its appeal to readers across denominational lines.

In The Jerusalem Post, Eco Bible was characterized as part of a growing movement that encourages religious communities to engage more deeply with environmental issues. The review noted that by grounding ecological concerns in Torah commentary, the book makes a case for ecological action as a religious and ethical obligation. Schwartz also discussed the book's aim to promote ecological awareness through scriptural interpretation. He emphasized the relevance of biblical teachings to modern environmental challenges and positioned the work as both a spiritual and practical guide for faith-based environmentalism.

== Notable endorsements ==
Eco Bible has been endorsed by prominent figures such as Rabbi David Rosen, Rabbi Jonathan Wittenberg, and Reverend Leah Schade, who highlight its potential to foster a greater sense of environmental responsibility among people of faith. Leaders in both religious and environmental spheres have praised the book for its innovative approach to combining faith and ecological concern. Bill Brown, Professor of Old Testament at Columbia Theological Seminary, called Eco Bible “a rich repository of insights… for people of faith to move forward with wisdom, inspiration and hope, all for the sake of God’s good creation.”
