= Yonatan Neril =

Rabbi and NGO director

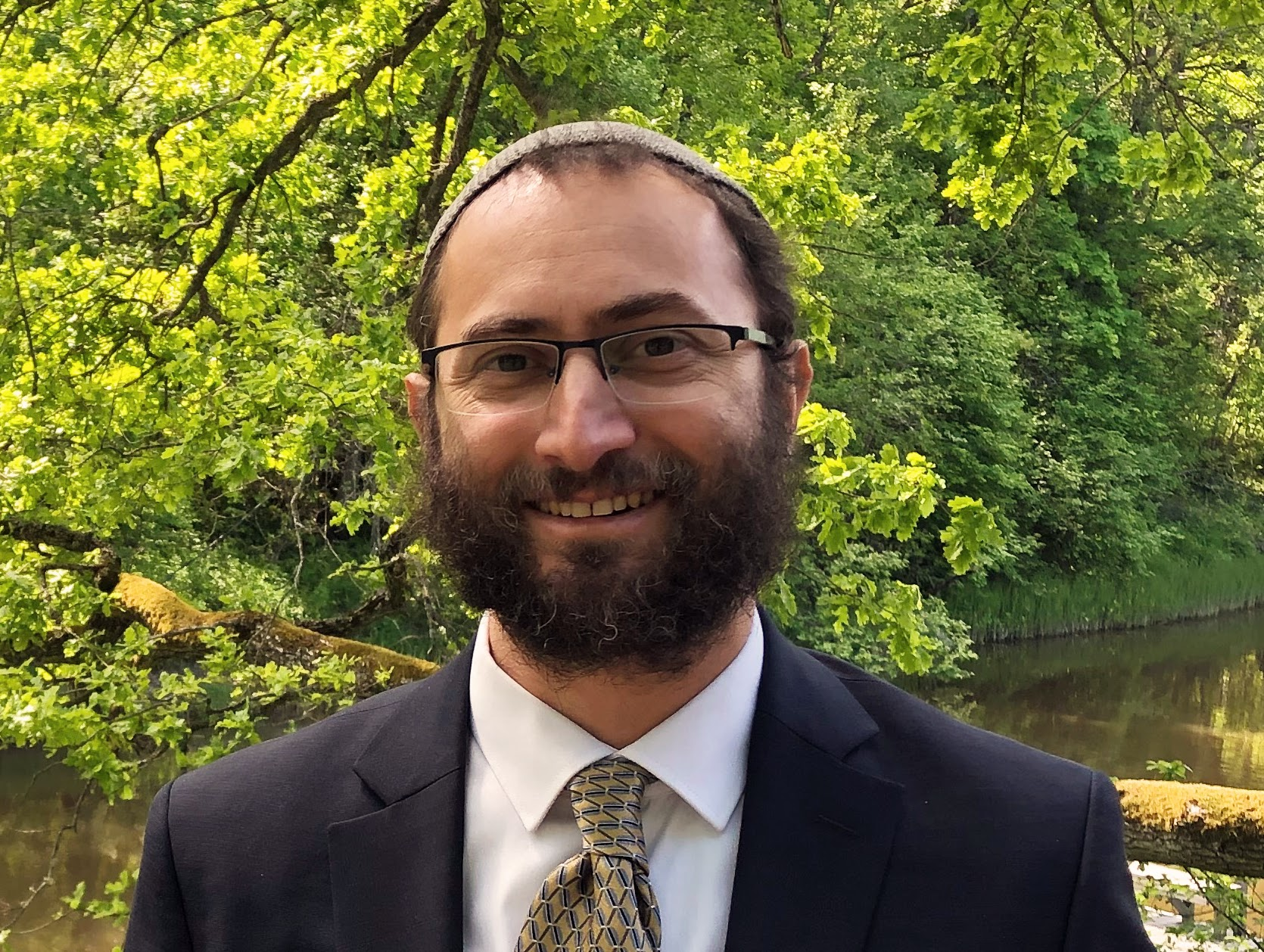

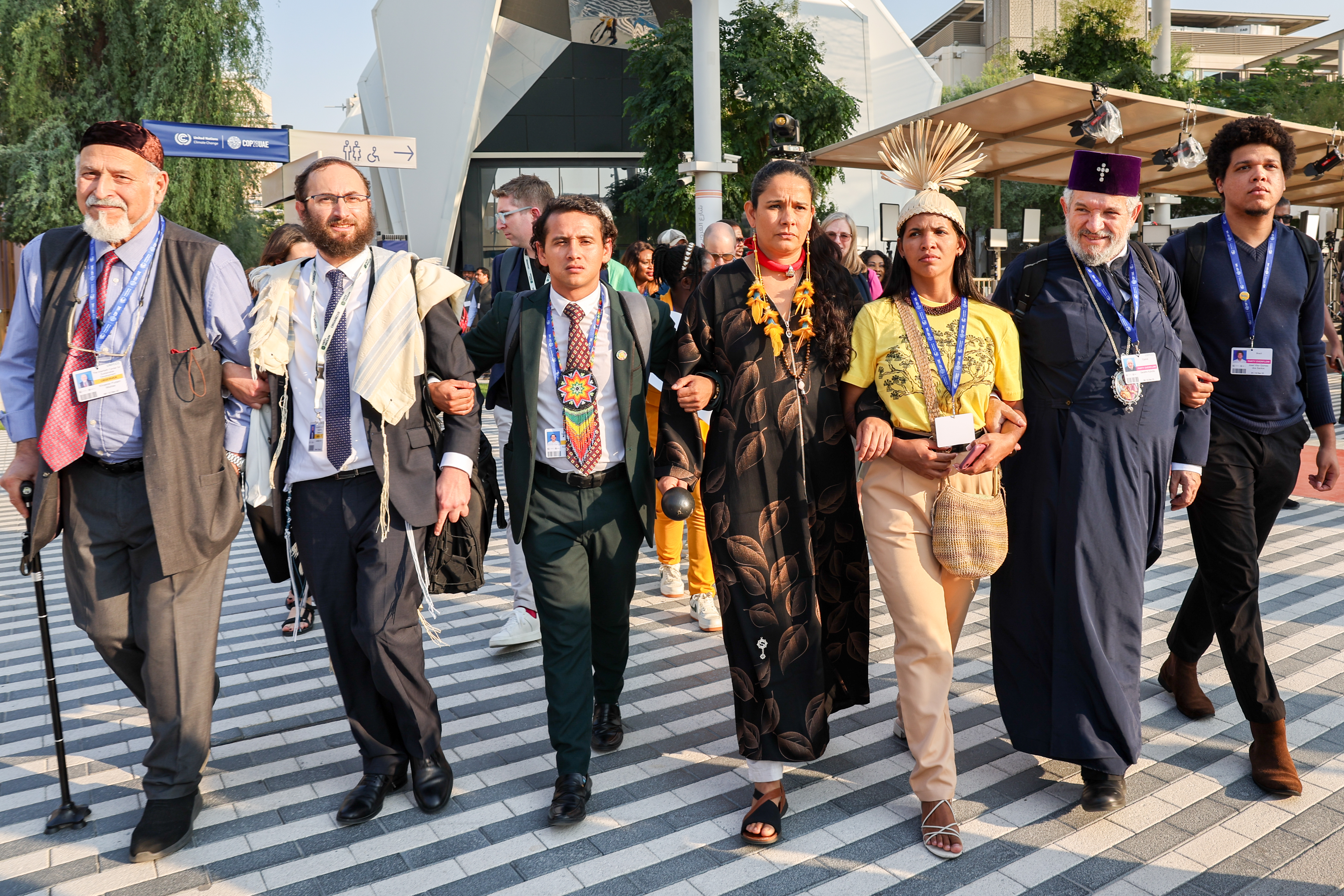
Interfaith walk co-organized by Rabbi Neril (second from left), at the UN climate conference COP28 in Dubai in December 2023.

Yonatan Neril (Hebrew: יונתן נריל; born September 30, 1980) is an interfaith environmental advocate, NGO director, and rabbi. He is the founder and current director of the Interfaith Center for Sustainable Development (ICSD), a non-profit organization based in Jerusalem.

Neril speaks internationally on religion and ecology. He has spoken at the World Economic Forum in Davos, multiple UN climate conferences, the Parliament of World Religions, and at dozens of houses of worship and podcasts. In December 2023 he was a co-organizer of the first-ever Faith Pavilion at a UN climate conference (COP28 in Dubai), which included 65 sessions with 325 speakers, and was hosted by the Muslim Council of Elders.

== Views ==
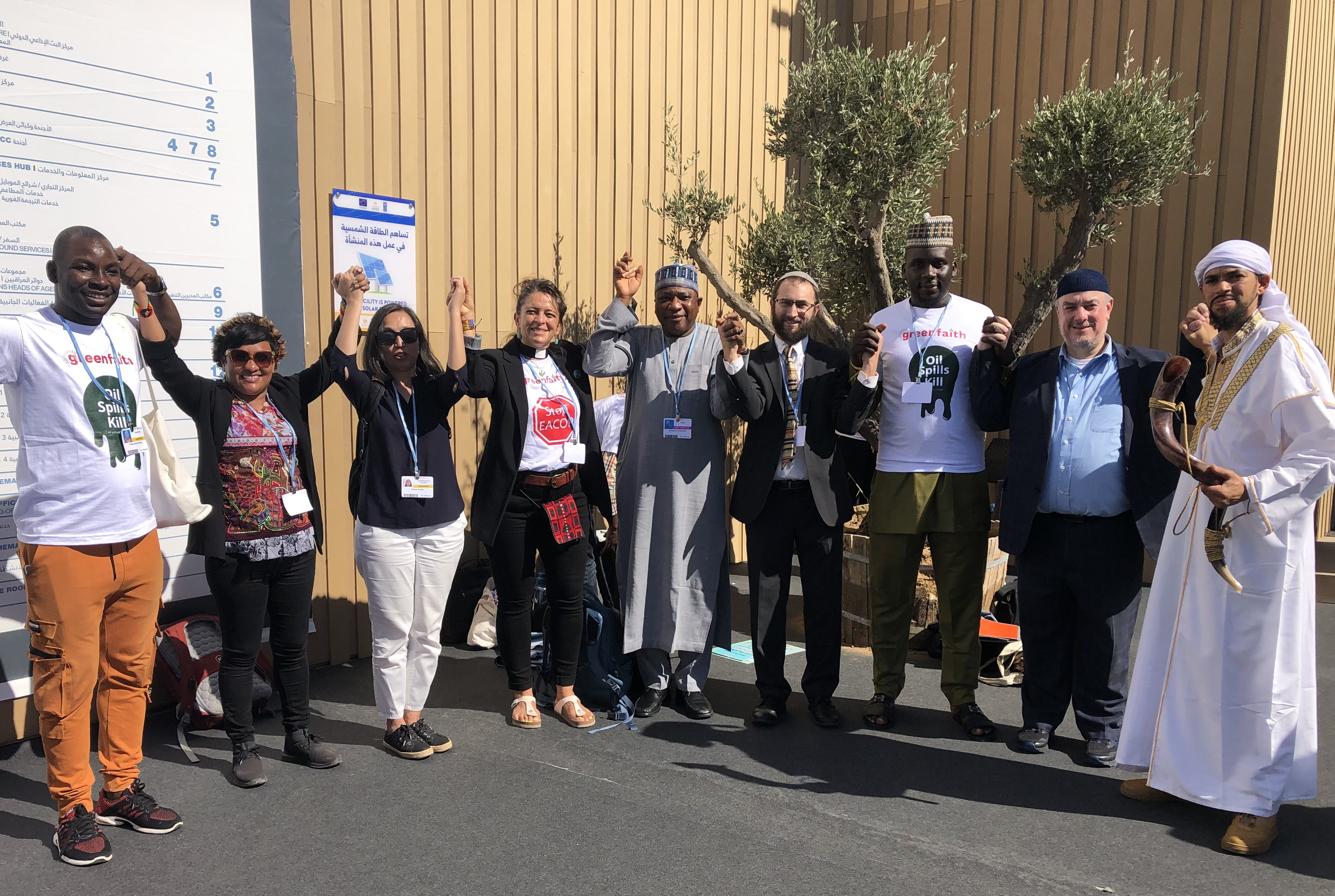
Interfaith engagement at COP27 UN climate conference in Sharm El Sheik, Egypt in November, 2022

Neril writes on religion and ecology, climate change, and environmental sustainability. He co-authored an interfaith oped in Euronews that was published during the COP28 UN climate conference, and co-authored an oped on religion, climate, and philanthropy that was published in the Chronicle of Philanthropy prior to the COP27 UN climate conference. He has also written dozens of blog posts on The Huffington Post, The Times of Israel, and the ICSD blog. He has stressed the importance of clergy taking a leadership role in ecological and climate action. His opeds and posts have emphasized how the climate crisis is at a deeper level a spiritual crisis, and how in our times, living righteously demands being ecologically responsible. Euronews quoted him during COP28 in 2023 as saying, “It’s not just about fossil fuels and carbon in the atmosphere; it’s also about how we live as spiritual beings in a physical reality. There are deeper issues underlying this crisis - including short term thinking, greed, arrogance and materialism. And there are spiritual solutions like long term thinking, humility, caring for other people, and caring for other creatures, which I think need to underpin humanity’s approach to curbing climate change.”

== Published books and reports ==
Between 2006 and 2011, Neril worked as a part-time consultant for Canfei Nesharim, a Jewish environmental organization now part of Grow Torah. During that time, he co-authored two books on Jewish environmental ethics, including Uplifting People and Planet: 18 Essential Jewish Teachings on the Environment.

In 2020, he co-authored Eco Bible volume 1: An Ecological Commentary on Genesis and Exodus. In 2021, he co-authored Eco Bible volume 2: An Ecological Commentary on Leviticus, Numbers, and Deuteronomy. Eco Bible has been a bestseller in multiple categories on Amazon, and has received over 100 reviews.

Eco Bible draws on thousands of years of Biblical commentary by Jewish sages. Eco Bible is an ecological commentary on the Five Books of Moses, otherwise known The Torah. In its review of Eco Bible, Publishers Weekly wrote that the book “will inspire contemplation on how to live in harmony with nature and the power of conservation.” Professor Bill Brown, Professor of Old Testament at Columbia Theological Seminary in Georgia calls Eco Bible “a rich repository of insights… for people of faith to move forward with wisdom, inspiration, and hope, all for the sake of God’s good creation.”

Neril also co-authored three ICSD reports on faith and ecology courses in seminary education in Israel, North America, and Rome.

== Co-organizing Conferences on Religion and Ecology ==
In 2010, Neril founded The Interfaith Center for Sustainable Development (ICSD) and its Jewish Eco Seminars branch.

Between 2011 and 2023, Neril co-organized thirteen interfaith environmental conferences in Jerusalem, Dubai, New York City, Washington, D.C., and other cities in the U.S.

In July 2011, Neril and the ICSD team organized an interfaith panel of Jewish, Muslim and Christian authorities, who discussed the religious importance of ecological sustainability. The panelists were Auxiliary Bishop to the Latin Patriarch of Jerusalem Msgr. William Shomali, the Deputy Minister of the Palestinian Authority’s Ministry of Religious Affairs Haj Salah Zuheika and AJC International Director of Inter-religious Affairs Rabbi David Rosen. Rabbi Neril also spoke at the event.

In March, 2012, Neril co-organized and spoke at the Interfaith Climate and Energy Conference in Jerusalem, which was focused on promoting change and action for a sustainable development within faith communities around the globe. The conference was co-organized by ICSD and the Konrad Adenauer Stiftung (KAS).

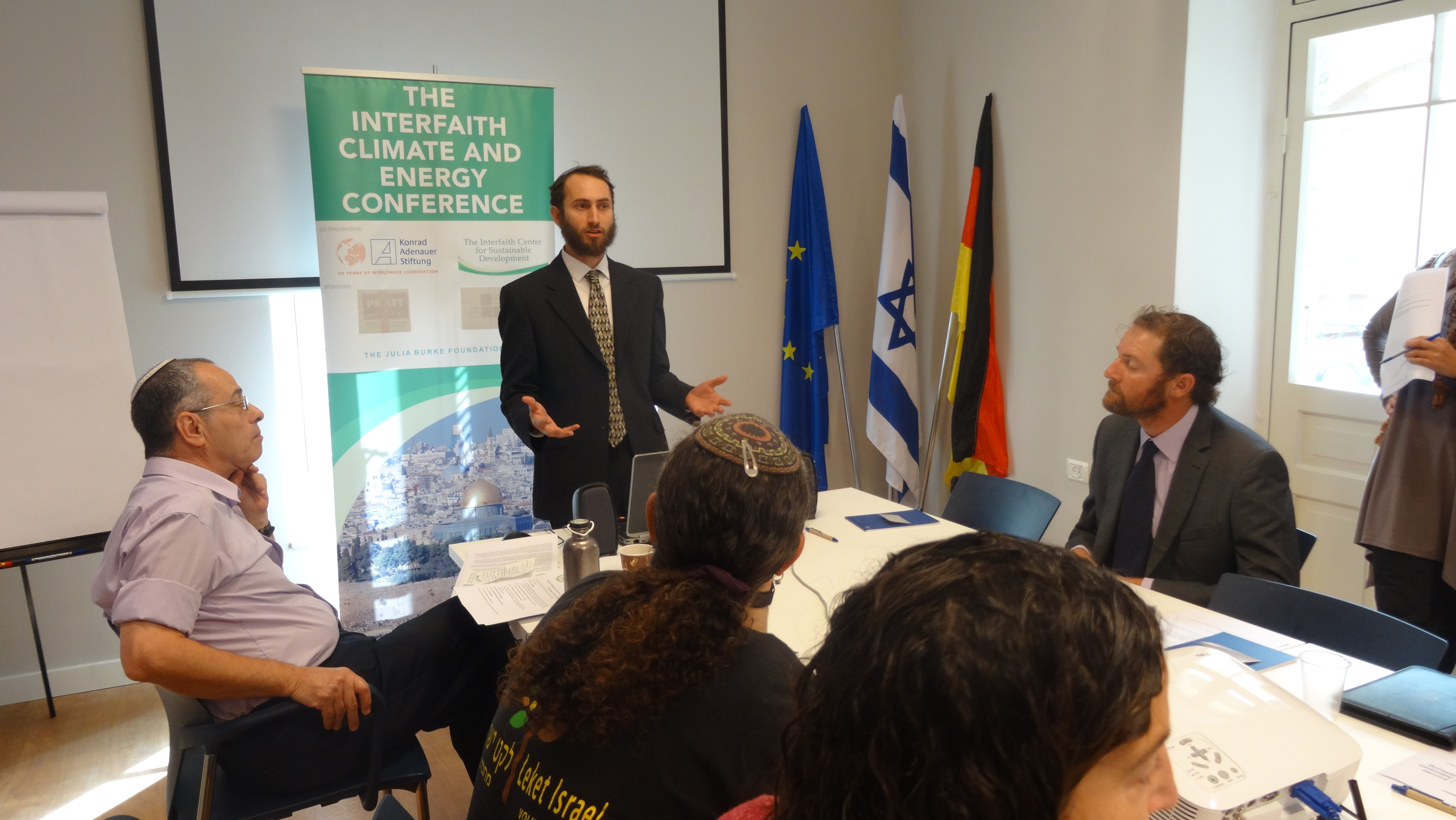
Speech in the Interfaith Climate & Energy Conference (2012)

In October, 2014, Neril spoke at the Faith and Ecology Conference for Seminarians in Jerusalem, which was co-organized by ICSD, KAS, and the Salesian Pontifical University. He discussed the importance of current and emerging faith leaders being a potential vehicle for environmental stewardship and to expand ecology and environmental teaching and action within seminaries.

In Istanbul, Turkey, Neril spoke along with other religious figures at the International Islamic Climate Change Symposium in August 2015, which featured the release of the Islamic Climate Change Declaration. In June, 2016, Neril presented at the International Seminar on Science and Religion for Environment Care in Torreciudad, Spain and at a press conference in Madrid. The Seminar concluded with a Torreciudad declaration that summarized in six points how a partnership between science and religion could promote ecological sustainability.

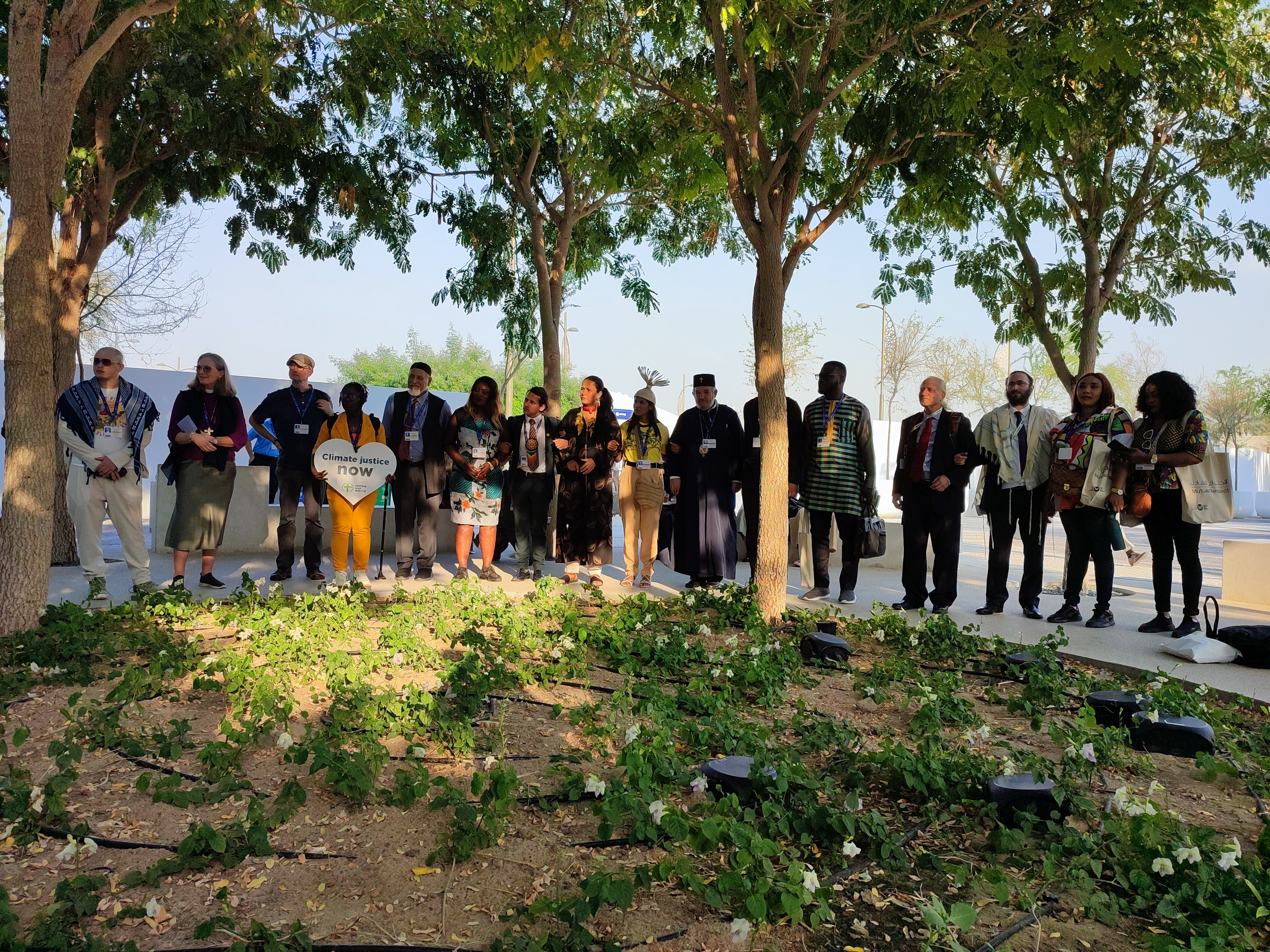
Interfaith Gathering at COP28

In the Jerusalem Press Club, on July 26, 2017, Neril acted as moderator of the panel with a judge of the Muslim Sharia Courts in Israel, Kadi Iyad Zahalha; Rabbi David Rosen; and the Custos of the Holy Land, Father Francesco Patton. The event focused on the key role faith leaders can play on raising awareness of the relevance and urgency of curbing climate change and achieving environmental sustainability.

Between 2016 and 2019, Neril was involved with ICSD and partners in co-organizing eight Symposia on Ecologically-informed Theological Education. They engaged about 1,000 US seminary faculty and deans, and were held in Los Angeles, Boston, and Chicago in 2019; in Dallas in 2019; in Atlanta in 2018; in Columbus, Ohio and Washington D.C. in 2017; and in New York City in 2016. The symposia were co-organized by ICSD, the Methodist Theological School in Ohio, and The Green Seminary Initiative, and supported by grants from the Henry Luce Foundation and the Julia Burke Foundation.

In November 2022, Neril organized four multifaith climate events at COP 27, including three the press conference space in the Blue Zone. He was also a co-organizer of the Sinai Interfaith Climate Call, which received media coverage in hundreds of media outlets.

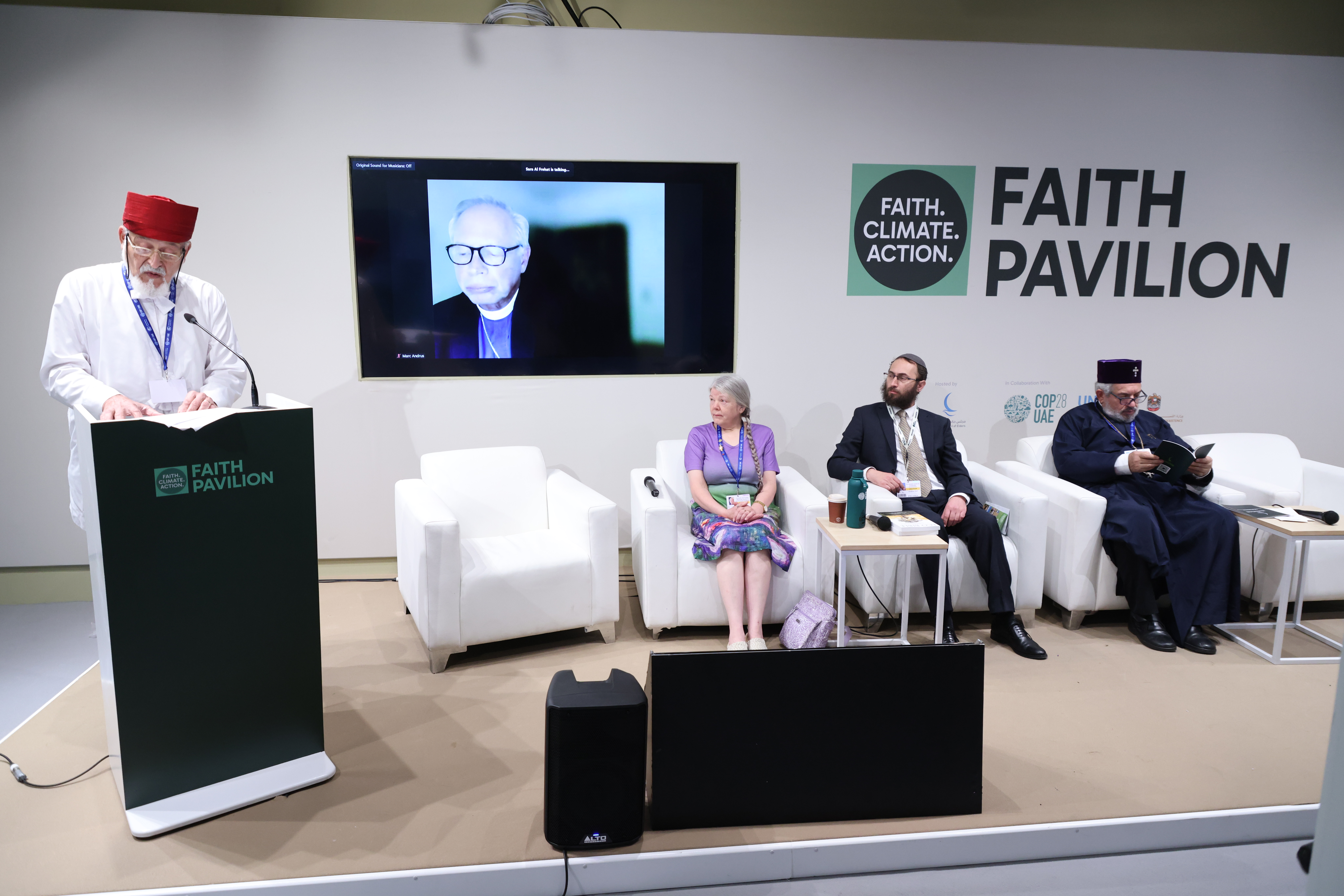
Faith Pavilion final session

In December 2023, Neril and ICSD collaborated with partnering organizations in holding a robust Faith Pavilion at the UN climate conference, COP28. The Faith Pavilion was hosted by the Muslim Council of Elders in collaboration with the COP28 Presidency, UNEP, and a diverse coalition of global partners including the Interfaith Center for Sustainable Development, the Episcopal Diocese of California, the International Partnership on Religion and Development (PaRD), and the Peace Department. Neril also co-organized an interfaith walk at COP28, and interfaith sessions in the UN Global Climate Action Hub, and the Green Zone.

== Personal life ==
Raised in California, Neril completed an M.A. and B.A. from Stanford University with a focus on global environmental issues, and received rabbinical ordination in Israel. While in university, he conducted research on renewable energy in northern India, and on genetically modified corn in Oaxaca, Mexico, about which he wrote his thesis. He was a Dorot Fellow, PresenTense Fellow, and Haas Koshland Award recipient. Neril lives in Jerusalem with his wife and children.
