= William P. Brown =

American minister

William P. Brown is an ordained minister in the Presbyterian Church USA, author, biblical theologian, and the William Marcellus McPheeters Professor of Old Testament at Columbia Theological Seminary.

== Education ==
Brown earned a Bachelor of Arts in Philosophy from Whitman College in Walla Walla, Washington in 1981. He then continued his education at Princeton Theological Seminary, Princeton, New Jersey, where he received a Master of Divinity with honors in 1985. From 1985 to 1987, he was then given the opportunity by Princeton Theological Seminary to study in Tübingen, Germany at Eberhard-Karls-Universität as their Tübingen Exchange Fellow. He then returned and earned his Doctor of Philosophy in Old Testament Studies from Emory University located in Atlanta, Georgia in 1991.

== Professional career ==
Brown has served in pastoral ministry as an assistant hospital chaplain, an assistant intern minister and as program advisor with responsibility for adult education at the North Decatur Presbyterian Church in Decatur, Georgia. He however has spent most of his professional life as an educator at various schools. In 1991, he became the Assistant Professor of Old Testament at Union Theological Seminary in Richmond, Virginia and soon became the Professor of Old Testament Union Theological Seminary and Presbyterian School of Christian Education in 2002. While still at Union Theological Seminary and Presbyterian School of Christian Education, he was honored with the position of the Aubrey Lee Brooks Professor of Biblical Theology. In 2004, he then moved and accepted the position of Professor of Old Testament Language, Literature, and Exegesis at Columbia Theological Seminary in Decatur, Georgia. Eight years later, Columbia Theological Seminary honored him with the new position of William Marcellus McPheeters Professor of Old Testament, which he still holds today.

He was a founding member of Earth Covenant Ministry, a grass-roots organization of Presbyterian churches in the Atlanta area, which recently has been incorporated into Georgia Interfaith Power and Light, where he serves as an educator to churches interested in creation care. He is also a board member of Ring Lake Ranch, Dubois, Wyoming.

== Writings ==
Brown has written an extensive list of books, scholarly articles and essays, dictionary articles, and book reviews. He has a great interest in the use of scripture in the life of the church and contemporary theological discourse, as well as in the ancient cultural contexts out of which scripture emerged. He specifically is interested in the Psalms, wisdom literature, the Pentateuch, the book of Isaiah, the history of ancient Israel, and modern literary theory. He was the primary person responsible for writing syllabi for the National Pastor-Theologian Program, as well.

His books include:

- The Seven Pillars of Creation: The Bible, Science, and the Ecology of Wonder. New York: Oxford University Press, 2010.
- Psalms. Interpreting Biblical Texts; Nashville: Abingdon, 2010.
- Seeing the Psalms: A Theology of Metaphor. Louisville: Westminster John Knox, 2002.
- God and the Imagination: A Primer to Reading the Psalms in an Age of Pluralism. The 2000 J. J. Thiessen Lectures; Winnipeg, Manitoba: CMBC Publications, 2001.
- Ecclesiastes. Interpretation Commentary Series; Louisville: Westminster John Knox, 2000.
- The Ethos of the Cosmos: The Genesis of Moral Imagination in the Bible. Grand Rapids: William B. Eerdmans, 1999.
- Obadiah - Malachi. Westminster Bible Companion; Louisville: Westminster John Knox, 1996.
- Character in Crisis: A Fresh Approach to the Wisdom Literature of the Old Testament. Grand Rapids: William B. Eerdmans, 1996.
- Structure, Role, and Ideology in the Hebrew and Greek Texts of Genesis 1:1 - 2:3. SBL Dissertation Series 132; Atlanta: Scholars Press, 1993.
- Wisdom's Wonder: Character, Creation, and Crisis in the Bible's Wisdom Literature. Grand Rapids: William B. Eerdmans, 2014.
- A Handbook to Old Testament Exegesis. Louisville: Westminster John Knox Press, 2017
- Deep Calls to Deep: The Psalms in Dialogue amid Disruption. Nashville: Abingdon, 2021

He has also edited a number of books including:

- Engaging Biblical Authority: Perspectives on the Bible as Scripture. Louisville: Westminster John Knox, 2007.
- The Ten Commandments: The Reciprocity of Faithfulness. Louisville: Westminster John Knox, 2004.
- Character and Scripture: Moral Formation, Community, and Biblical Interpretation. Grand Rapids: Eerdmans, 2002.
- Co-editor (with S. Dean McBride Jr.), God Who Creates: Essays in Honor of W. Sibley Towner. Grand Rapids: Eerdmans, 2000.
- Co-editor (along with M. Patrick Graham and Jeffrey K.-J. Kuan) of History and Interpretation: Essays in Honour of John H. Hayes. JSOTSup 173; Sheffield: Sheffield Academic Press, 1993.
- The Oxford Handbook of the Psalms. New York: Oxford University Press, 2014. (Due to be released Spring 2014).
