= Interfaith Center for Sustainable Development =

Interfaith organization based in Jerusalem

Interfaith Center for Sustainable Development (ICSD)
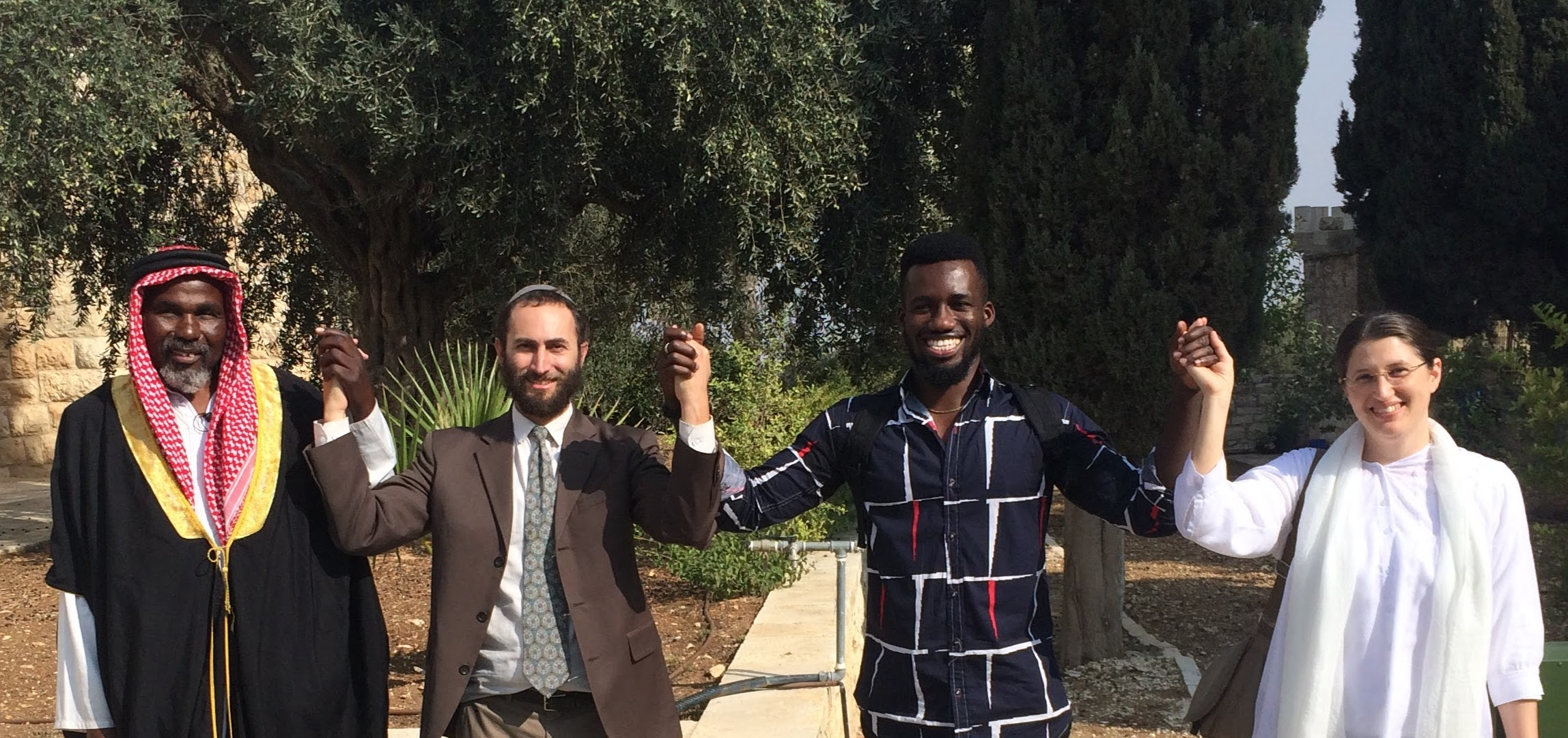
- Formation: 2010
- Type: Non-governmental organization
- Purpose: Interfaith Cooperation, Environmental Sustainability
- Location: Jerusalem, Israel
- Executive Director: Rabbi Yonatan Neril
- Website: https://www.interfaithsustain.com

The Interfaith Center for Sustainable Development (ICSD), is a nonprofit organization that connects religion and ecology and mobilizes faith communities to act. Based in Jerusalem, ICSD was founded by Rabbi Yonatan Neril in 2010.

ICSD's work relates to multiple aspects of interfaith environmental engagement. First, ICSD co-organizes interfaith environmental conferences that amplify the voices of religious leaders and scientists on spirituality and ecology. Second, ICSD published and distributes Eco Bible, a commentary on the Hebrew Bible, as well as the EcoPreacher resource. Third, the Interfaith Eco Seminary Engagement Project promotes teaching of ecologically informed theological education, to spur courageous moral leadership for sustainability. Fourth, ICSD engages in the Faith Inspired Renewable Energy Project, in cooperation with faith institutions in Africa and the renewable energy platform Gigawatt Global, to deploy solar power in Africa. Fifth, ICSD co-organizes The Los Angeles Faith & Ecology Network, which engages faith-based leadership in mobilizing a grassroots action for stewardship of Creation.

== Interfaith engagement at UN climate conferences ==
In November 2024, ICSD co-organized interfaith events at the COP29 UN climate conference in Baku, Azerbaijan. One of the events involved religious figures using "their moral authority to convince their followers and world leaders to act on the climate crisis."

In December 2023, ICSD was a co-organizer of the first-ever Faith Pavilion at a UN climate conference (COP28 in Dubai), which included 65 sessions with 325 speakers. It was hosted by the Muslim Council of Elders, and located in the Blue Zone. ICSD also co-organized interfaith sessions in the UN Global Climate Action Hub, and the Green Zone. ICSD's director co-authored an interfaith oped in Euronews that was published during the COP28 UN climate conference, and co-authored an oped on religion, climate, and philanthropy that was published in the Chronicle of Philanthropy prior to the COP27 UN climate conference.

In November 2022, ICSD organized four multifaith climate events at COP27, the United Nations climate change summit, including three press conferences in the Blue Zone. ICSD was also a co-organizer of the Sinai Interfaith Climate Call, which received media coverage in hundreds of media outlets. ICSD was involved in an interfaith climate repentance ceremony that took place during COP27, in collaboration with the Elijah Interfaith Institute and Peace Department.

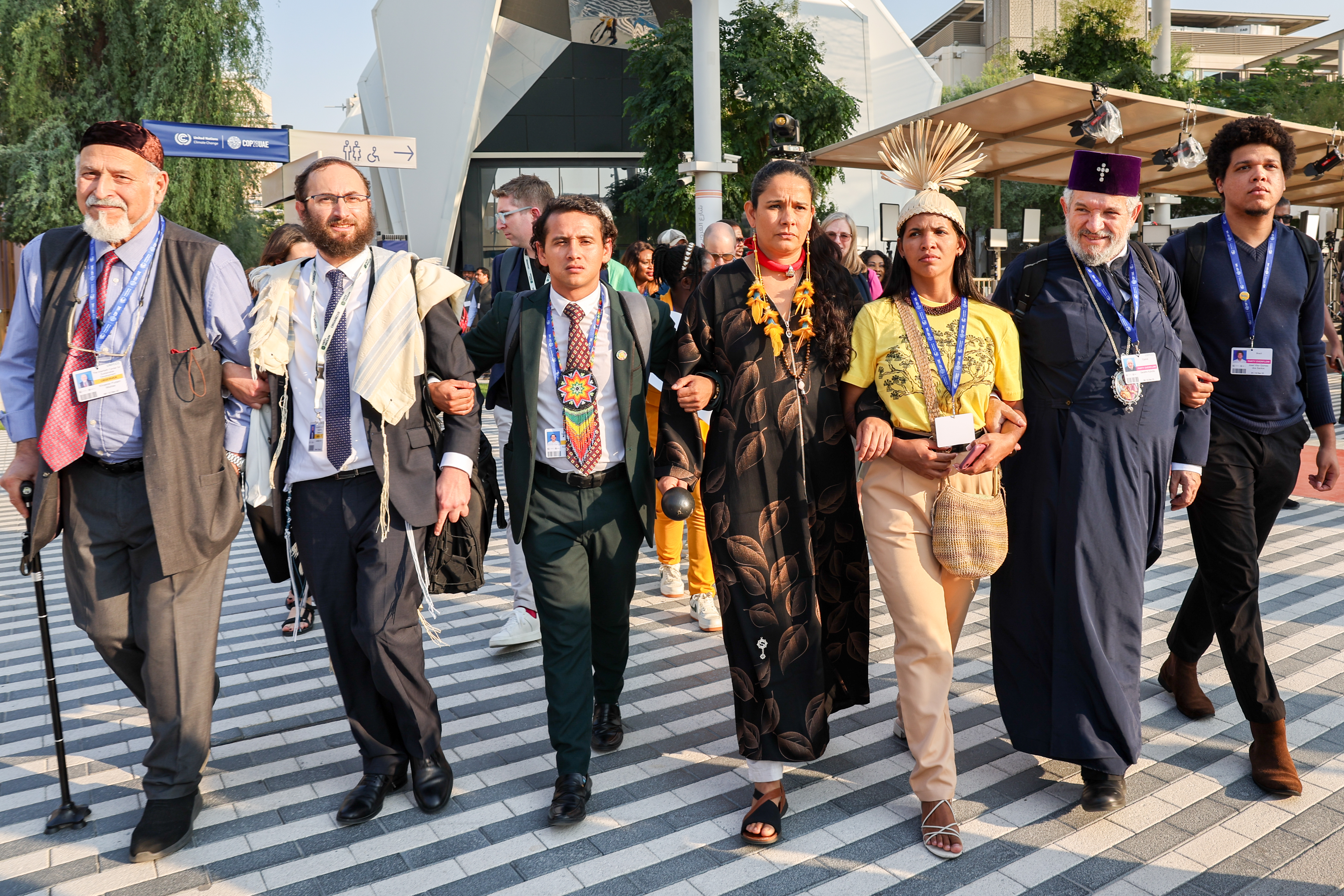
Interfaith walk at COP28 UN climate conference, co-organized by ICSD

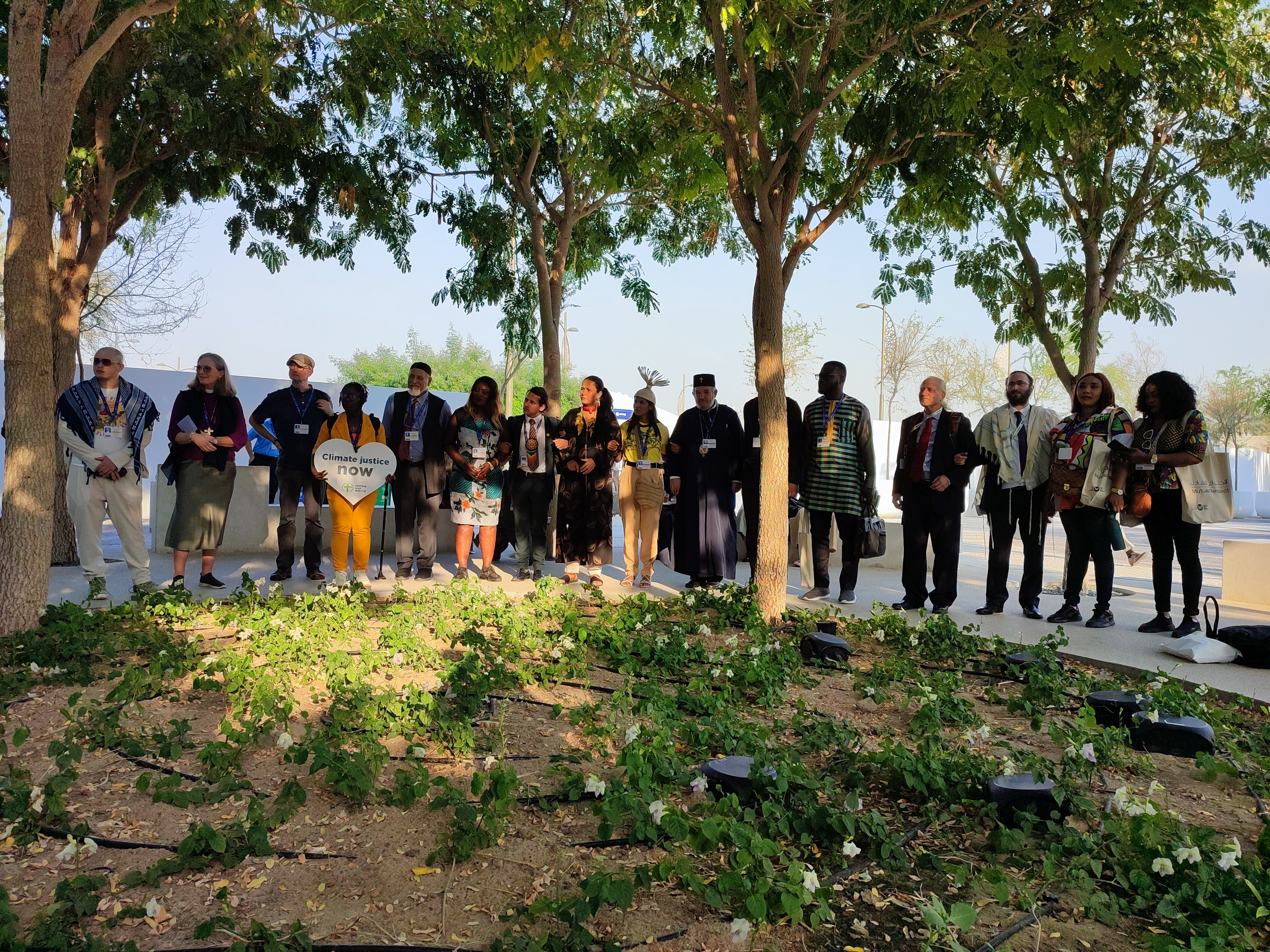
Interfaith walk at forest in COP28

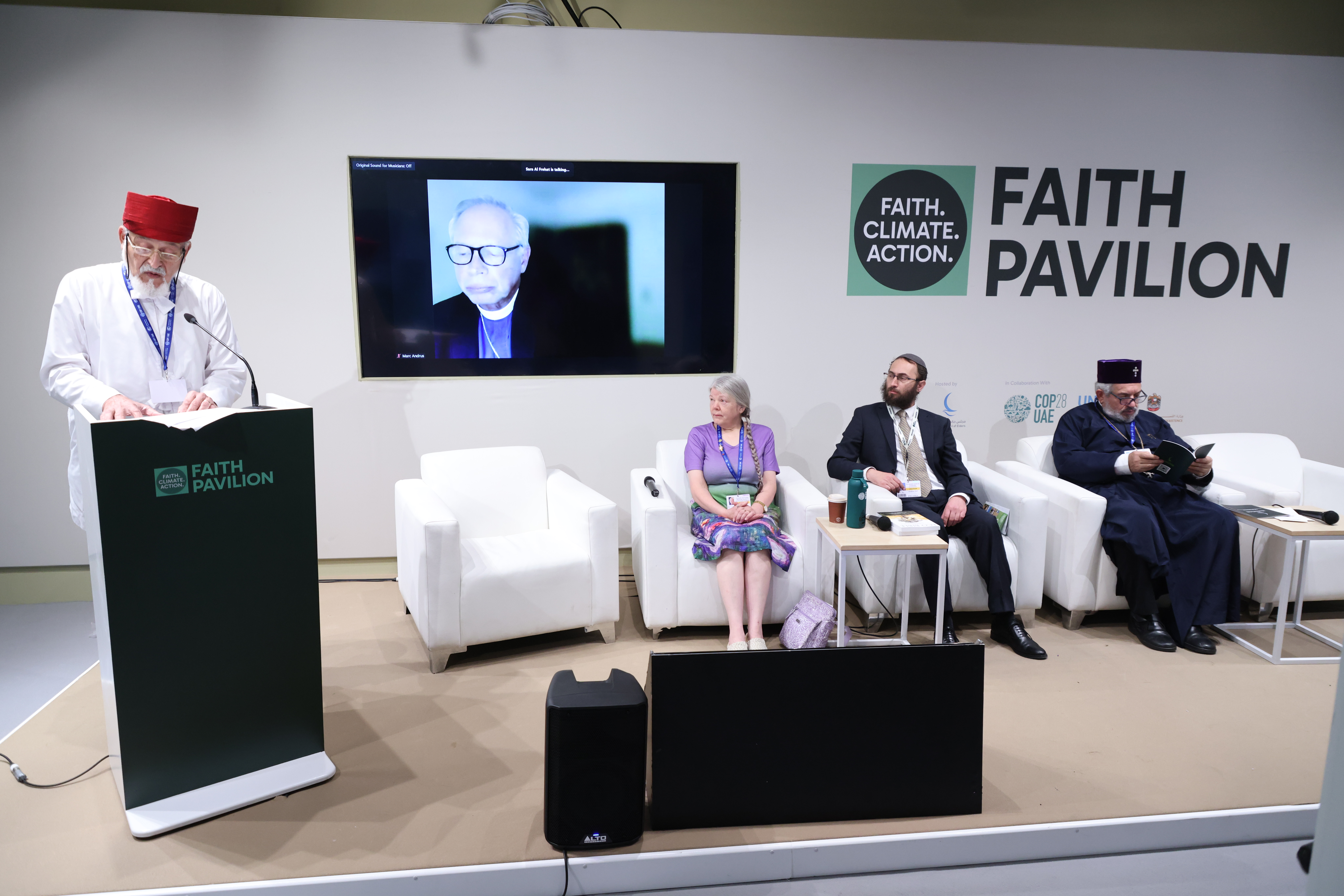
Session organized by ICSD at Faith Pavilion at COP28

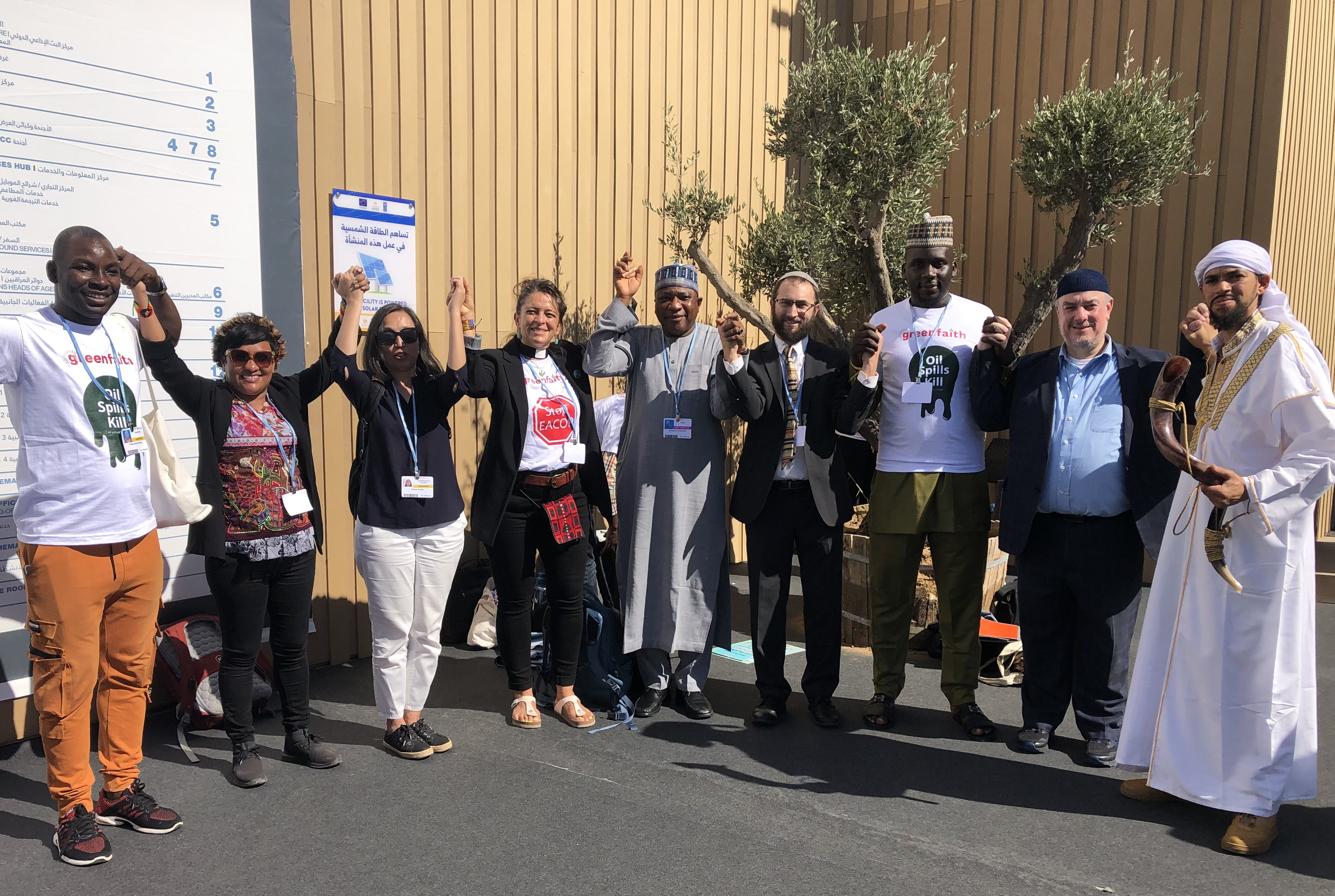
Interfaith engagement at COP27 UN climate conference in Sharm El Sheik, Egypt in November, 2022

ICSD organized an interfaith climate event at the Jerusalem Press Club, on July 26, 2017. Speakers included a judge of the Muslim Sharia Courts in Israel, Kadi Iyad Zahalha; Rabbi David Rosen; and the Custos of the Holy Land, Father Francesco Patton. The event focused on the key role faith leaders can play on raising awareness of the relevance and urgency of curbing climate change and achieving environmental sustainability.

In addition, ICSD's director has spoken at the World Economic Forum in Davos, multiple UN climate conferences, and the Parliament of World Religions. ICSD's director spoke at the International Islamic Climate Change Symposium in August 2015, which featured the release of the Islamic Climate Change Declaration. In June, 2016, ICSD's director presented at the International Seminar on Science and Religion for Environment Care in Torreciudad, Spain and at a press conference in Madrid.

== Eco Bible ==
In 2020, ICSD published Eco Bible volume 1: An Ecological Commentary on Genesis and Exodus. In 2021, ICSD published Eco Bible volume 2: An Ecological Commentary on Leviticus, Numbers, and Deuteronomy. Eco Bible has been a bestseller in multiple categories on Amazon, and has received over 100 reviews, making it one of the highest reviewed books on religion and ecology on the Amazon platform.

Eco Bible draws on thousands of years of Biblical commentary by Jewish sages. Eco Bible is an ecological commentary on the Five Books of Moses, otherwise known The Torah. In its review of Eco Bible, Publishers Weekly wrote that the book “will inspire contemplation on how to live in harmony with nature and the power of conservation.” Professor Bill Brown, Professor of Old Testament at Columbia Theological Seminary in Georgia calls Eco Bible “a rich repository of insights… for people of faith to move forward with wisdom, inspiration, and hope, all for the sake of God’s good creation.”

== Eco Preacher 1-2-3 ==
In an effort to encourage clergy to preach and teach on Christian ecology at least once a month, ICSD and the Rev. Dr. Leah Schade partnered to develop EcoPreacher 1-2-3. This resource for Christian priests and pastors provides sermon preparation for preaching about caring for God’s Creation. It is distributed to hundreds of pastors each month. As Inside Climate News reported, EcoPreacher "works toward helping more of the faithful view climate change not so much as a political issue but as something rooted in religion."

== Video Engagement on Social Media ==
The Interfaith Center for Sustainable Development, in collaboration with the Episcopal Diocese of California and The Episcopal Church, hired Nas Daily Studios to produce 50 short videos on religion and ecology between September and December, 2024. The videos were posted across six social media platforms, and received million of views. Among the topics addressed are solar panels on churches, Hindu teachings and vegetarianism, and faith-based tree planting. The videos include Catholic, Episcopal, Indigenous, Muslim, Hindu, Buddhist, Shinto, Jewish, Sikh and other voices.

== Engaging Seminaries Project ==
This project encourages divinity and theological schools and seminaries to integrate lessons on faith and ecology. Between 2011 and 2023, ICSD co-organized thirteen interfaith environmental conferences in Jerusalem, Dubai, New York City, Washington, D.C., and other cities in the U.S. The conferences engaged seminary deans, faculty, clergy and others on religion and ecology.

- In July 2011, ICSD organized an interfaith panel of Jewish, Muslim and Christian authorities, who discussed the religious importance of ecological sustainability.
- In March, 2012, ICSD co-organized and spoke at the Interfaith Climate and Energy Conference in Jerusalem, which was focused on promoting change and action for a sustainable development within faith communities around the globe. The conference was co-organized by ICSD and the Konrad Adenauer Stiftung (KAS).
- In October, 2014, ICSD co-organized the Faith and Ecology Conference for Seminarians in Jerusalem, together with KAS, and the Salesian Pontifical University. The conference focused on the importance of current and emerging faith leaders being a potential vehicle for environmental stewardship and to expand ecology and environmental teaching and action within seminaries.

Between 2016 and 2019, ICSD co-organized ten Symposia on Ecologically-informed Theological Education. They engaged about 1,000 US seminary faculty and deans. The Symposia included the Southeast Symposium on Ecologically Informed Theological Education in Atlanta in March 2018; the Midwest Symposium on Ecologically Informed Theological Education in 2017; the Washington D.C. Symposium on Ecologically Informed Theological Education in 2017; and a New York City conference at Union Theological Seminary in 2016. Other Symposia took place in Atlanta, Boston, Chicago, Dallas, and Los Angeles. The symposia were co-organized by ICSD, the Methodist Theological School in Ohio, and The Green Seminary Initiative, and supported by grants from the Henry Luce Foundation and the Julia Burke Foundation.

=== Reports on Faith and Ecology Courses in Seminary Education ===
ICSD published three ICSD reports on faith and ecology courses in seminary education in Israel, North America, and Rome, including a Report on Faith and Ecology Courses in North American Seminaries. Research for the report indicated that the number and diversity of courses on faith and ecology at institutions training seminarians in North America increased in the past number of years. Out of 231 seminaries investigated, over 165 courses were found to have been offered at over 55 seminaries in the United States and Canada.

== Faith-inspired Renewable Energy Project in Mozambique ==
The Interfaith Center for Sustainable Development, Gigawatt Global, and the Anglican Church of Southern African are collaborating on a solar field in Niassa province, Mozambique to promote deployment of renewable energy and scalable rural sustainable development in Africa. In August 2019, an MOU and land-lease agreement was signed for large-scale solar fields on Anglican church lands in Mozambique. The project was launched in 2017, based on support from the Julia Burke Foundation.

== Los Angeles Faith & Ecology Network ==
ICSD co-organizes The Los Angeles Faith & Ecology Network, in collaboration with California Interfaith Power & Light. The LA Faith and Ecology Network (LAFEN) engages faith-based leadership in mobilizing a grassroots action for stewardship of Creation. It is one of the only such networks of clergy and green team leaders in North America. The Network has met monthly since its launch in August, 2020. LAFEN and Temple Isaiah, Los Angeles, organized an event in 2021 focused on city, county and state sustainability goals, and ways in which the faith voice can be strengthened in crucial climate action. In 2022, LAFEN published an interfaith letter to Archbishop Gomez of the Catholic Archdiocese of Los Angeles, calling on him to end oil drilling at the Murphy Drill Site, which is owned by the Los Angeles Catholic Archdiocese and leased to Freeport McMoRan Incorporated.

== Eco Israel Tours ==
Eco Israel Tours is a branch of the ICSD which provides a range of eco-tourism programs in Israel.

== Jewish Eco Seminars ==
Jewish Eco Seminars (JES) is another branch of ICSD that works with a range of Jews in Israel and North America to increase their ecological awareness and strengthen their Jewish identity.
