= Eternity (magazine) =

US Christian magazine (1950–1988)

- Categories: Christian magazine
- Frequency: Monthly
- Founder: Donald Barnhouse
- Founded: 1931; 95 years ago
- First issue: 1950; 76 years ago
- Final issue: January 1989; 37 years ago
- Company: Evangelical Foundation
- Country: United States
- Based in: Philadelphia, Pennsylvania
- Language: English
- ISSN: 0014-1682

Eternity was a monthly conservative Christian magazine published from 1950 to 1988. It included major contributions from such well known individuals as F. F. Bruce and others.

== History and profile ==
In 1931, Donald Barnhouse, the minister of Tenth Presbyterian Church in Philadelphia, Pennsylvania, founded Revelation magazine. He served as editor-in-chief until his death in 1960. He renamed the magazine Eternity in 1950. From 1961 to 1986, Joseph Bayly wrote a column for Eternity entitled "Out of My Mind." In 1958 Our Hope merged with Eternity, which continued as Eternity

It announced its closure in 1988. According to worldcat.org, it was published by the Evangelical Foundation of Philadelphia. (Evangelical Foundation, later Evangelical Ministries, became what is now known as the Alliance of Confessing Evangelicals and continues to operate the ministry started by Dr. Barnhouse.) While Eternity Magazine is not fully digital, portions are being republished, both as books and as web content. The process is based on a volunteer team.

== See also ==
- Donald Barnhouse
- Walter Ralston Martin
- Joseph T. Bayly
