= Mariano Di Gangi =

American pastor and author

- Born: 23 July 1923; Brooklyn, New York
- Died: 18 March 2008 (aged 84); Ottawa, Ontario
- Education: Westminster Theological Seminary, Philadelphia (1946); The Presbyterian College, Montreal (postgrad)
- Church: Presbyterian Church in Canada
- Congregations served: Tenth Presbyterian Church (Philadelphia, 1961-67); Knox Presbyterian (Toronto, 1987-92)

Mariano Di Gangi (23 July 1923 in Brooklyn – 18 March 2008 in Ottawa) was a minister of the Presbyterian Church in Canada.

== Biography ==
A native of Bushwick, Brooklyn, Di Gangi graduated from Brooklyn College in 1943 and earned a Bachelor of Theology from Philadelphia's Westminster Theological Seminary in 1946 and joined the Presbyterian Church in Canada, (serving as a Student Missionary at Cote St George, Quebec in 1943) following additional postgraduate courses at The Presbyterian College, Montreal. He served congregations in Montreal, preaching in both English and Italian from 1946 to 1951, in Hamilton, Ontario from 1951 to 1961, where St Enoch's Church (merged in 2005 to become Trinity Presbyterian Church, Hamilton) grew to a membership of over 1,000. He served on the Committee of Evangelism and Social Action of the Presbyterian Church in Canada, and was part of the group that produced the Declaration of Faith Concerning Church and Nation deemed a subordinate standard of the church in 1954.

He then returned to Philadelphia to serve at the historic Tenth Presbyterian Church in from 1961 to 1967. He returned to pastoral duties at Knox Spadina in Toronto, Ontario, where he was an Elder before becoming Interim Minister in 1987; and Senior Pastor from 1989 to 1992. In 2000, he retired to Ottawa where his son-in-law was a pastor. He also taught at Tyndale University College and Seminary(then known as Ontario Theological Seminary); and was named Professor Emeritus in Pastoral Theology. He served as the Canadian and North American Director of a missionary agency called Interserve (formerly Bible and Medical Missionary Fellowship) from 1967 to 1988.

He was designated an "Evangelist-at-Large" within the Presbyterian Church in Canada during the 1970s and 1980s, and hosted a radio broadcast Amazing Grace, sponsored by Presbyterian Men, and broadcast on a few stations, and also participated on other radio ministries in both Canada and the United States.

He was also active in the formation and early years of the Evangelical Fellowship of Canada and served for two years as that organization's president from 1969. He was also a popular preacher, who preached at many special services, including Anniversaries, conferences (such as Urbana 84), and at Evangelistic Meetings particularly in Canada, the US, and in Italy. He was also involved in the formulation of papers connected to the Lausanne Covenant.

Di Gangi authored many books dealing with the Christian faith, including A Golden Treasury of Puritan Devotion: Selections from the Writings of Thirteen Puritan Divines, Twelve Prophetic Voices, The Book of Joel: A Study Manual, and The Spirit of Christ.

A chapter in Tenth Presbyterian Church of Philadelphia: 175 Years of Thinking and Acting Biblically by Philip Ryken deals with Di Gangi's pastorate of that church, where he was preceded by Donald Grey Barnhouse and succeeded by James Montgomery Boice.

== Publications ==
- The Book of Joel ('The Shield Bible Study Series'). Grand Rapids Mich.: Baker Book House, 1970. ISBN 0-8010-2800-0
- The Spirit of Christ. Grand Rapids, Mich.: Baker Book House, c1975. ISBN 0-8010-2849-3
- Word for all seasons: preaching through the Christian year. Burlington, Ontario: G.R. Welch Co., c1980. ISBN 0-919532-54-3
- Understanding Handel's Messiah. Burlington, Ontario: Welch, c1984. ISBN 0-919649-85-8
- Understanding Handel's Messiah. Hantsport, N.S.: Lancelot Press, 1995, c1984. ISBN 0-88999-571-0
- The happy people: discovering our Lord's secret of real happiness as revealed in His Beatitudes. Agincourt, Ontario: Bible & Medical Missionary Fellowship, c1976.
- Reaching the unreached: a report on the Canadian Consultation on Evangelism. Agincourt, Ontario: BMMF International/Canada, 1983.
- Life and immortality. Agincourt, Ontario: Bible & Medical Missionary Fellowship, 1975.
- The sufferings and the glory: a devotional study of the 22nd Psalm. Agincourt, Ontario: Bible & Medical Missionary Fellowship, [197-].
- The meaning of Christian discipleship. Agincourt, Ontario: Bible & Medical Missionary Fellowship, 1975.
- A living church: compared to what the Bible says about a living church, is yours alive or in need of revival? Agincourt, Ontario: Bible & Medical Missionary Fellowship, [197-?].
- Peter Martyr Vermigli 1499-1552: Renaissance Man, Reformation Master. Lanham, MD: University Press of America, 1993.

Religious titles
Preceded by Donald Grey Barnhouse	Senior Pastor of Tenth Presbyterian Church; 1961-1967	Succeeded by James Montgomery Boice
