= Litfin =

Litfin is a surname. Notable people with the surname include:

- Ben Litfin (born 1995), Australian soccer player
- Duane Litfin (born 1943), American academic administrator and evangelical minister
- Günter Litfin (1937–1961), German tailor who became the second known person to die at the Berlin Wall
- Dave Litfin (1958-2022), author, professional thoroughbred horse racing handicapper for The Daily Racing Form
