= Ruth Tiffany Barnhouse =

American physician (1923–1999)

Ruth Tiffany Barnhouse (October 23, 1923 – May 5, 1999), also known by her married name Ruth Beuscher, was an American psychiatrist, theologian, and Episcopal priest. Best known for being the psychiatrist of Sylvia Plath, she corresponded with her since they met at McLean Hospital in Belmont, Massachusetts following Plath's breakdown in 1953. Though Plath destroyed most of their letters, fourteen from Plath to Barnhouse remain (not including the two from Barnhouse to Plath in the Sylvia Plath papers at Smith College).

== Early life ==
Barnhouse was born to American parents near Grenoble, France, in 1923. The family moved to Philadelphia when she was two. Her father, Donald Grey Barnhouse, took up a teaching position at the University of Pennsylvania and was pastor of the Tenth Presbyterian Church in Philadelphia from 1927 to 1960. She was homeschooled by her grandmother Tiffany, whose late husband was a distant cousin of the founder of Tiffany & Co. With a high IQ, Barnhouse was admitted to Vassar College at fourteen and enrolled at sixteen. Meanwhile, she had met her first husband, Francis C. Edmonds Jr., at a religious retreat. Edmonds graduated from Princeton University in 1940. They eloped in 1941 after her father forbade them from marrying.

Shortly thereafter, she regretted her marriage but was hesitant about ending it as she was pregnant. In 1943, she gave birth to a second child. In 1944, at twenty-one, she enrolled at Barnard College, where she completed her bachelor's degree, and continued on to Columbia University Medical School, where she earned a medical degree. She left Edmonds toward the end of her first year at Barnard. He, then a medical doctor, assumed full responsibility for the children. His parents took care of them until the divorce went through and he had remarried in 1947. Divorce and child custody were topics Barnhouse would later discuss in her letters to Plath. Following the divorce, she met William Beuscher, her peer at Columbia, who likewise would go on to complete a residency in psychiatry at McLean. They married and had five children, but she divorced him later, citing emotional abuse and alcoholism.

While still a full-time psychiatrist and mother, Barnhouse became involved in the Episcopal church in her town. She enrolled part-time at the Weston College of Theology in Cambridge, Massachusetts, and became a full-time resident in 1973 on track to obtain a master's degree in theology. However, after the Episcopal Church allowed the ordination of women in 1976, she was ordained a deacon in 1978 and a priest in 1980. She taught at Southern Methodist University's Perkins School of Theology.

== Sylvia Plath correspondence ==
In 1953, when she was a resident psychiatrist at McLean hospital, she developed a relationship with a college-aged Plath. Later, when Plath published The Bell Jar, Barnhouse was reincarnated as the character Dr. Nolan, the protagonist's psychiatrist during her stay at a mental hospital. According to Barnhouse, Plath was one of her first patients. They would stay in touch long after Plath left McLean, up until one week before Plath's death.

At the beginning of the fourteen letters at Smith College, Plath discusses her pregnancies and her and husband Ted Hughes's writing careers, reflecting on how she will sustain her creative life as a mother. The tone becomes less optimistic, however, when she describes her suspicions of Ted's affair. Barnhouse (though referred to by Plath in her letters as “Dr. Beuscher”) instructs Plath to hire a good lawyer and to bar Ted from her bed and her home.

== Publications ==
- Plath, Sylvia. The Bell Jar, Harper, 2013.
- Plath, Sylvia. The Letters of Sylvia Plath: Volume I, 1940–1956. Edited by Peter K. Steinberg and Karen V. Kukil, Harper, 2017.
- Plath, Sylvia. The Letters of Sylvia Plath: Volume II, 1956–1963. Edited by Peter K. Steinberg and Karen V. Kukil, Harper, 2018.
- Plath, Sylvia. The Unabridged Journals. Edited by Karen V. Kukil, Anchor, 2000.
- Barnhouse, Ruth Tiffany. Homosexuality: A Symbolic Confusion, Seabury Press, 1977.
- Barnhouse, Ruth Tiffany and Holmes, Urban T., ed., Male and Female: Christian Approaches to Sexuality, Seabury Press, 1976.
