= John Boardman =

John Boardman may refer to:

- John Boardman (art historian) (1927–2024), British classical art historian and archaeologist
- John Boardman (physicist) (1932–2025), American physicist, science fiction fan, author and gaming authority
- John Boardman (merchant) (1758–1813), early settler of Troy, New York
- John Joseph Boardman (1893–1978), American Roman Catholic bishop
