= Education for Ministry =

Education for Ministry (EfM) is a program of theological education-at-a-distance which originated at Sewanee: The University of the South, Tennessee, United States, while Urban T. Holmes III was dean, drawing on the work of the Jesuit theologian Bernard Lonergan. It was previously known as Theological Education by Extension (TEE). While the program is not exclusive to the Episcopal Church, it is mainly found in parishes of that church. Study is conducted in small groups consisting of 6-12 members, facilitated by mentors who have been certified by the EfM program. It is a four-year program of study covering the Old and New Testaments, the history of the Christian religion, and theology. Persons seeking either ordained or lay ministries may enroll.

It is used in many dioceses of the Anglican Communion in North America and throughout the world (students are active in Australia, Central America, Europe, New Zealand, South America and the United Kingdom, as well as Canada and the US), from progressive to traditional, and Anglo-Catholic to evangelical, including Southern Ohio (Cincinnati), Massachusetts (Boston), Springfield, Illinois, Canada, Central Pennsylvania, and Albany, New York.
