= Henry Augustus Boardman =

American minister and author

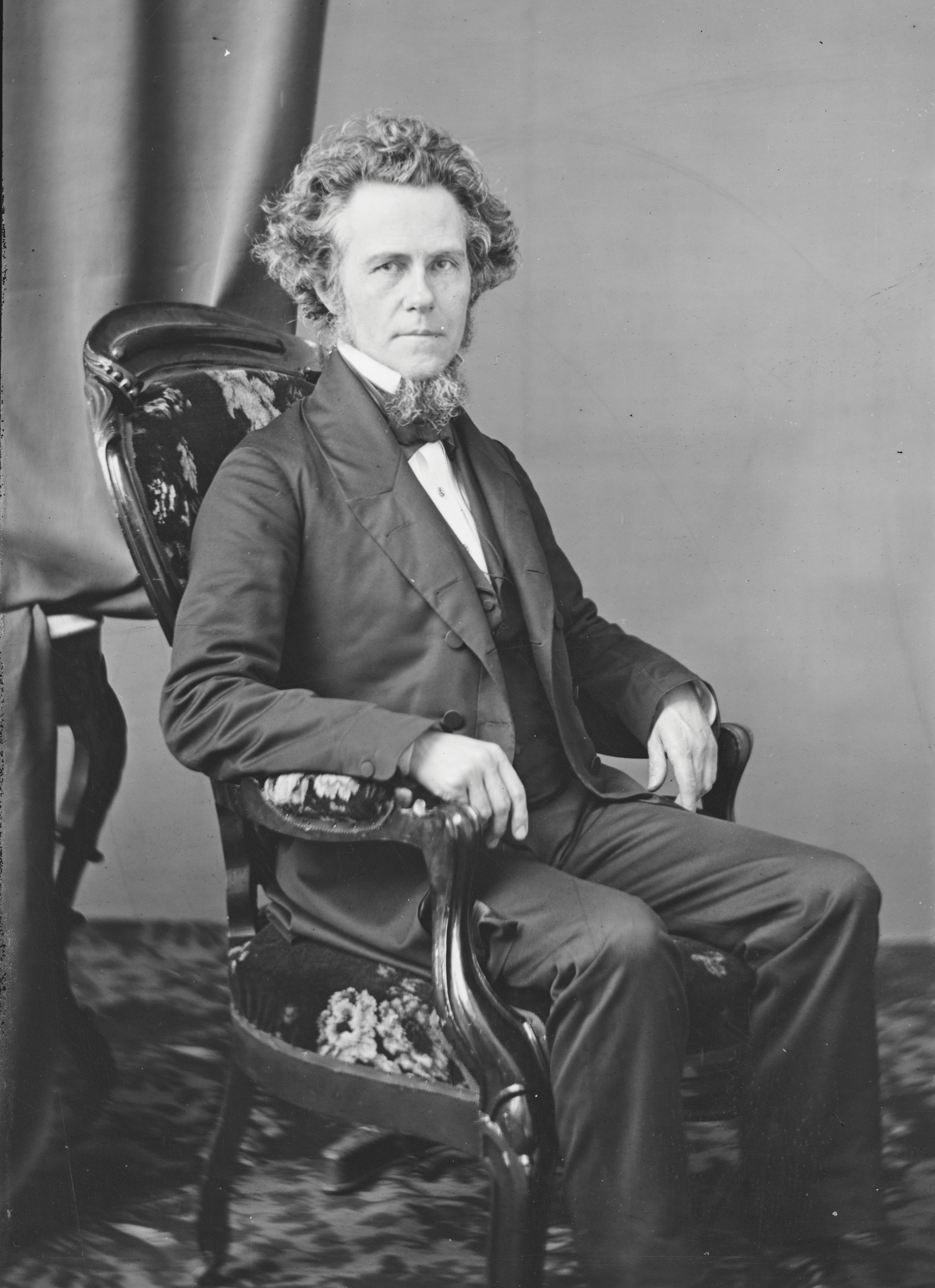
- Born: January 9, 1808; Troy
- Died: June 15, 1880; Philadelphia
- Education: Princeton Theological Seminary, Yale University
- Occupation: Cleric

Henry Augustus Boardman (January 9, 1808 – June 15, 1880) was an American minister and author.

Boardman was born in Troy, N Y, January 9, 1808. His parents were John Boardman and Clarinda (Folger) Starbuck, and he often said that he was the product of a Puritan father and a Quaker mother. He graduated from Yale College in 1829. In the fall of 1830 he entered the Theological Seminary in Princeton, N. J., and in April 1833, was licensed to preach. In September 1833, he was called to the pastorate of the Tenth Presbyterian Church of Philadelphia, over which he was duly installed, November 8, 1833, and of which he continued in charge until May 1876, when he became Pastor Emeritus. He served as moderator of the Presbyterian General Assembly in 1854 and was also on the board of directors for the Princeton seminary, which now holds his papers.

In 1851, he was elected as a member to the American Philosophical Society.

During his long and eminent pastorate, he was repeatedly called to other fields of labor,—notably in May 1853, to the chair of Pastoral Theology in Princeton Seminary. He published many volumes and pamphlets, on theological subjects. The degree of D.D. was conferred on him by Marshall College. After an interval of feeble health, he died in Philadelphia, June 15, 1880, aged 72 years. He left three sons and two daughters, one son being a graduate of Yale in the Class of 1859.
