= Duke Street Church, Richmond =

Coordinates: 51°27′42″N 0°18′14″W

Duke Street Church
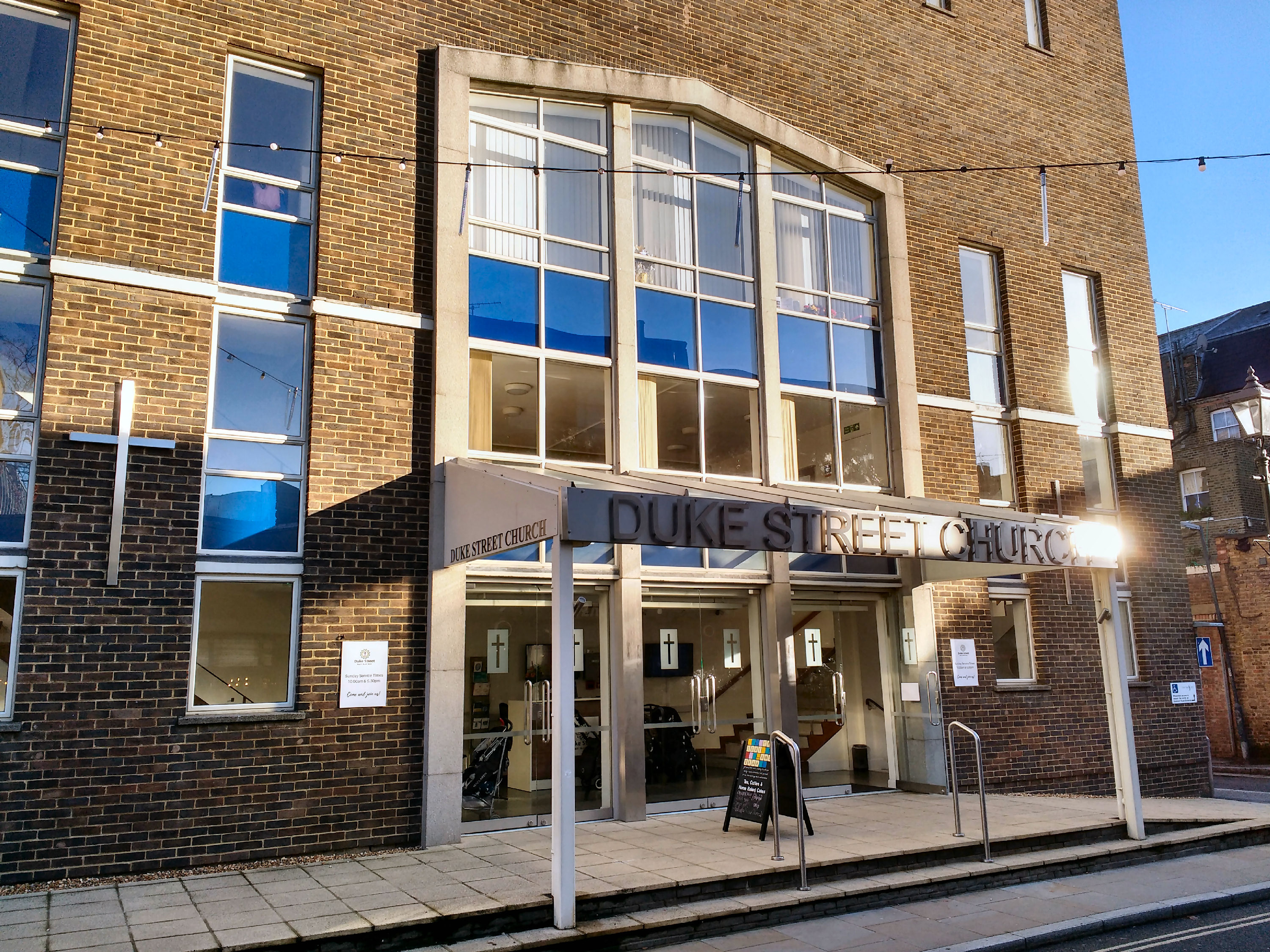
- The front of the church building in 2018
- Duke Street Church
- Location: Duke Street, Richmond TW9 1DH
- Country: England
- Denomination: Conservative Evangelicalism
- Website: www.dukestreetchurch.com

History
- Founded: 1870
- Founder: Frederick Brotherton Meyer

Architecture
- Years built: 1962

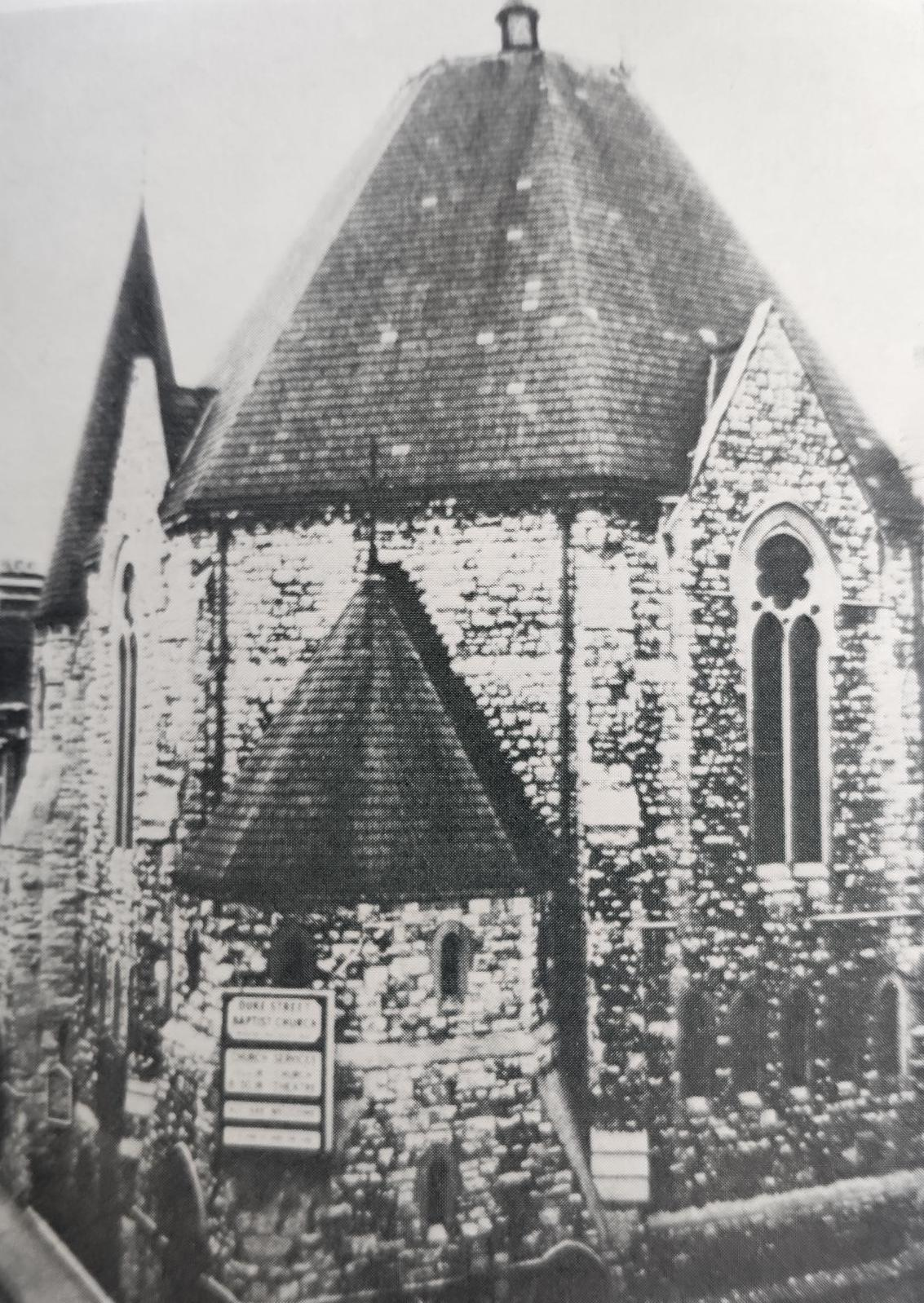
The old Octagon 1881-1961 designed by Morton Glover

Duke Street Church is a conservative evangelical church in Duke Street, Richmond, South West London, with a historical Baptist tradition. It is affiliated with the Fellowship of Independent Evangelical Churches (FIEC), the Evangelical Alliance and the Affinity and South East Gospel Partnership.

== History ==
Efforts from 1868 by a student pastor Frederick Brotherton Meyer started to gain traction*, and in 1869 he wrote to the Charles Spurgeon, then President of the London Baptist Association asking for his help to establish something more permanent.

It initially met with forty-seven members in 1870 as Parkshot Church in an iron tabernacle, located off Park Lane. Due to a desire to be nearer the town centre, in 1878 the original church and land were sold to a group who went on to found Christ Church, Richmond. This location now corresponds to The Gateways building on Park Lane.

In 1881 the first Duke Street building was completed, octagonal-shaped and built in stone in the early French Gothic style. It was listed in its trust deeds as Duke Street Baptist Chapel, a 'particular' or Calvinistic chapel. Despite struggling initially, by 1946 it had become too small to accommodate its congregation, and Sunday evening services were being transferred to Richmond Theatre.

In 1950 the adjoining Victorian dance hall (Princes Hall) was bought, and in 1962 Sir Cyril Black opened the current building as Duke Street Baptist Church with a large auditorium able to seat over 600. In the early 2000s it was again renamed to the current Duke Street Church. Subsequent works have included a cafe area, meeting rooms and offices in 2010 followed by a major renovation of the auditorium completed in 2022.

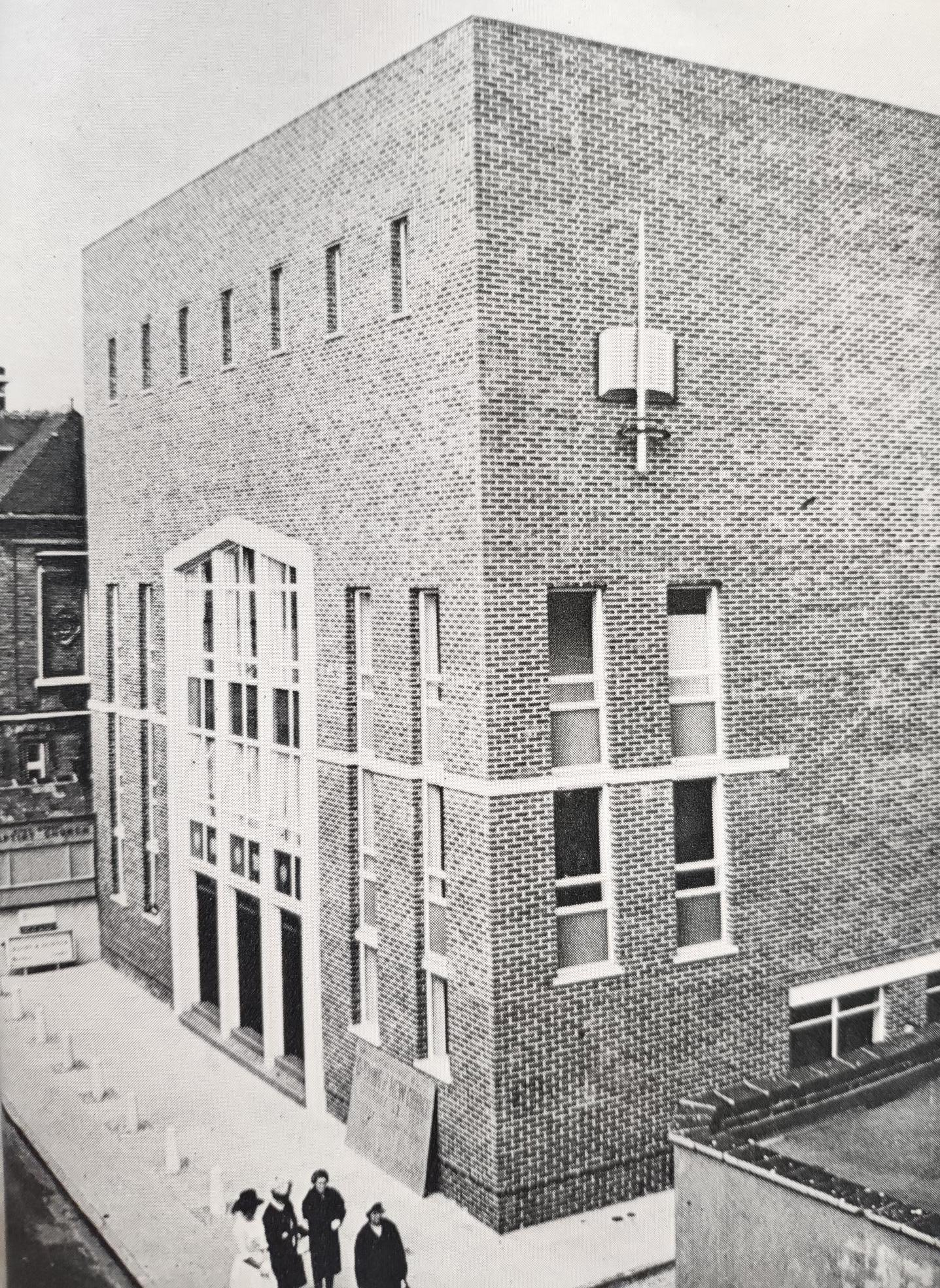
The new Duke Street Church building in 1962

== Other early Baptist groups in Richmond ==
Despite the assertion in The Duke Street Story 1870-1970 by Harry Young that "The first attempt to found a Baptist cause in Richmond was made in 1862", there is clear evidence around 1715-1730 of a Baptist church existing in Richmond, under Thomas Flood. In addition, by the 1850s a Strict Baptist group had formed, Rehoboth Chapel on Kew Foot Road.

A disagreement in 1861 within Rehoboth Chapel led to a split, and thirteen members left to start Salem Baptist Chapel in Richmond. They met initially in rooms on Church Walk, then in 1863-1887 met in the building now known as the Dome Building on the Quadrant, but known at the time as the Mechanics Institute (from 1843), the Public Baths or the Baths (1855), and the Royal Assembly Rooms (1868). In his history of this building, A. Barkas, Richmond Borough Librarian noted that it was being used as a Baptist Chapel after being the Royal Assembly Rooms. In 1888 Salem Baptist Chapel relocated to Parkshot Road, then finally moved to Kew in 1973, becoming Kew Baptist Church before closing in 2021.

== Senior Ministers ==
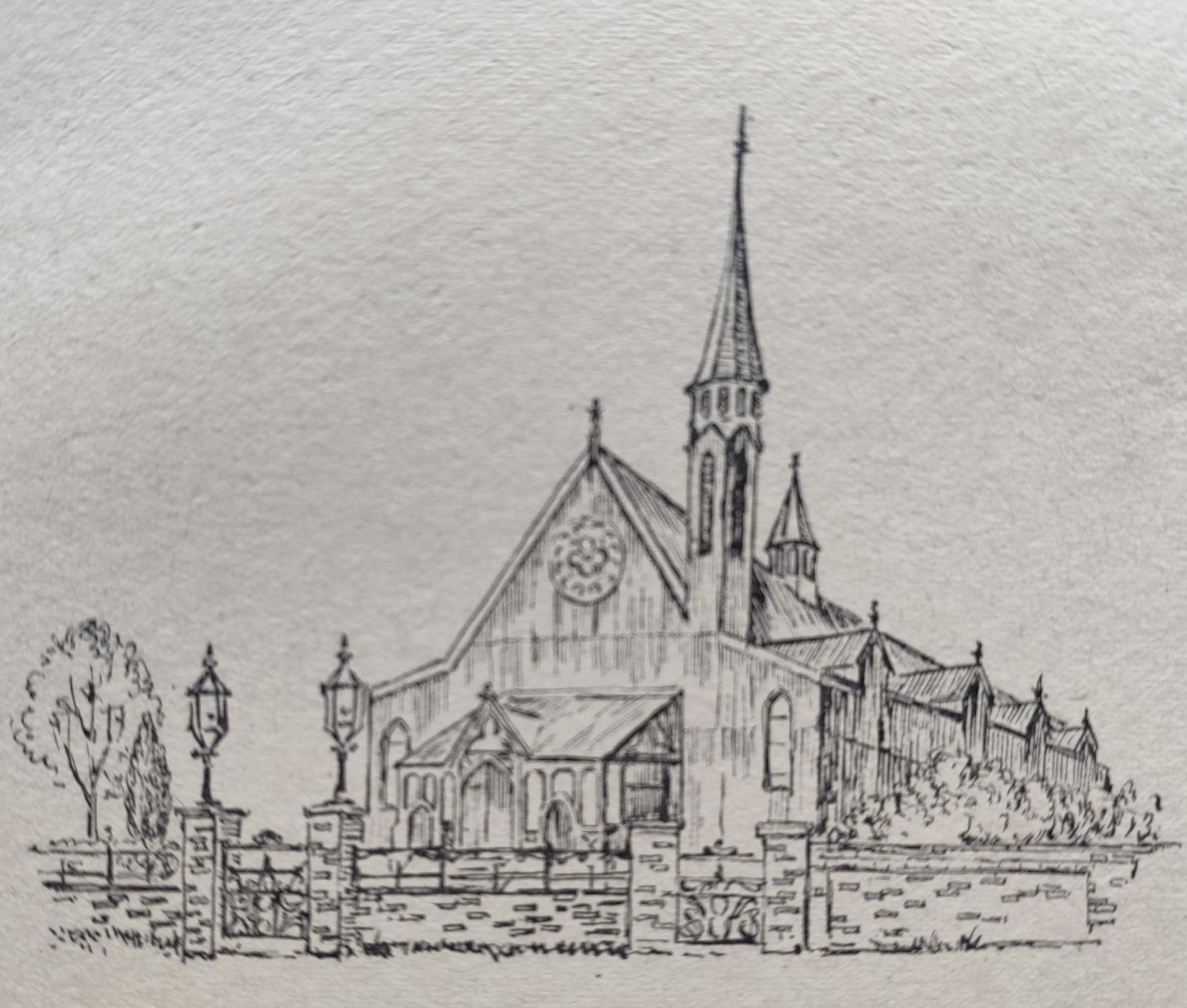
Image of Parkshot Church, 1870

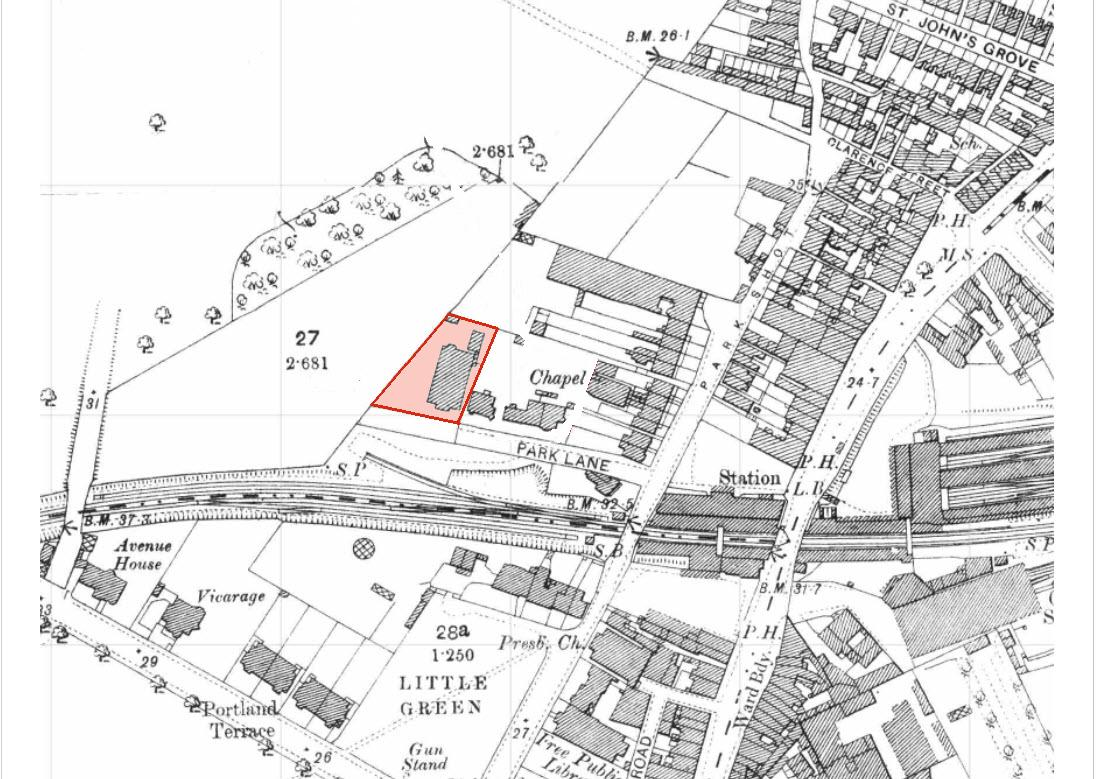
Original location - Parkshot Church (1870), based on Ordnance Survey 2nd ed. 1896

=== Previous Senior Ministers ===
| From | To | Name | From | To | Name |
|---|---|---|---|---|---|
| 1868 | 1869 | Fredrick B Meyer, as student pastor | 1926 | 1939 | Fred W. Walter |
| 1870 | 1872 | Robert J Colman (resigned) | 1940 | 1953 | Alan Redpath |
| 1873 | 1875 | John Whittaker (resigned) | 1953 | 1959 | Stephen F. Olford |
| 1875 | 1884 | John Hunt Cooke | 1959 | 1978 | John L. Bird (died unexpectedly in a medical operation on 7 May 1978). |
| 1885 | 1890 | James J. Ellis (resigned) | 1978 | 1986 ** | REV. DR. WILLIAM (BILL) FREEL |
| 1891 | 1891 | interim – James Tillett | 1982 | 1986 | interim – George Beasely-Murray |
| 1892 | 1898 | Ernest Matthews (resigned) | 1986 | 1999 | Robert G.M. Amess |
| 1899 | 1921 | Horace Warde | 2000 | 2012 | Liam Goligher |
| 1922 | 1926 | E. B. Greening | 2013 | 2023 | John L. Samuel |

Sir Eric Richardson (died 2006) was a long-time member and deacon at Duke Street, being appointed CBE in 1962 and knighted for his work in higher education in 1968. He was an exponent of polytechnic education who headed three institutions that have developed into universities – Salford, City and Westminster, and was a leader of 20th-century evangelical Christianity.

== Notes ==
** Documentary evidence of the Senior Minister between 1978-1986 remains unclear. ^{[needs more investigation]} From George Beasely-Murray's biography, Chapter 10 we know he worked as a Church Moderator (interim for pastoral vacancies) between 1980-1986 at three churches. In order they were (1) Beckenham (2) Woodmansterne and (3) Duke Street Baptist Church. "When my father was moderator of Duke Street Baptist Church situated in Richmond, south west London, very close to the River Thames. Duke Street, for many years a very strong and staunchly evangelical church, had lost its previous minister in the unhappiest of circumstances. Relationships within the church were at rock-bottom. It was an extraordinarily difficult situation." From this it seems likely the church was without a Senior Minister for a number of years after 1978, with George Beasely-Murray arriving around (est.)1982 to serve as an interim until retiring in 1986 once Robert G.M. Amess.was appointed.
