= Duane Litfin =

American college president and pastor

The Reverend Duane Litfin
- Born: A. Duane Litfin; November 14, 1943 (age 82); Detroit, Michigan, US

Ecclesiastical career
- Religion: Christianity (evangelical)
- Congregations: First Evangelical Church, Memphis

Academic background
- Education: Philadelphia College of Bible; Purdue University; University of Oxford
- Influences: J. I. Packer

A. Duane Litfin (born 1943) is an American academic administrator and evangelical minister. He was the seventh president of Wheaton College in Wheaton, Illinois.

== Early life and education ==
Litfin was born on November 14, 1943. He holds an undergraduate degree in biblical studies from the Philadelphia College of Bible (now Cairn University) and a master's degree in theology from Dallas Theological Seminary. His two doctoral degrees are from Purdue University (communication) and Oxford (New Testament).

== Career ==
Litfin came to Wheaton College in 1993 from Memphis, Tennessee, where he served the First Evangelical Church as senior pastor. Prior to that, he was an associate professor at Dallas Theological Seminary. He also taught at Purdue University and Indiana University.

Litfin has authored several books and his writings have appeared in numerous journals and periodicals. His most recent book, Paul's Theology of Preaching, published in 2015, explores the Apostle Paul's vision of Christian ministry.

Litfin announced his retirement in March 2009. He was succeeded as president on July 1, 2010, by Philip Ryken, formerly senior pastor of the Tenth Presbyterian Church in Philadelphia and a 1988 graduate of Wheaton.

== Controversy ==
During Litfin's time at Wheaton, multiple professors were fired due to a perceived lack of adherence to the college's statement of faith, including one professor who converted to Roman Catholicism and another who was critical of creationism.

In a major cultural change for the college, Litfin in 2003 presided over the lifting of the ban on dancing and eased its restrictions on tobacco and alcohol use.

An article in the SoMA review discusses some of the more controversial aspects of Litfin's tenure at Wheaton.

== Personal life ==
Litfin is married and has three children.

== Selected publications ==
- Litfin, A. Duane (1992). Public Speaking: A Handbook for Christians (2nd ed.). Baker Book House. ISBN 9780801056758.
- Litfin, A. Duane (1994). St. Paul's Theology of Proclamation: 1 Corinthians 1–4 and Greco-Roman Rhetoric. Cambridge University Press. ISBN 9780521451789.
- Litfin, A. Duane (2004). Conceiving the Christian College. W.B. Eerdmans Pub. Co. ISBN 9780802827838.
- Litfin, Duane (2012). Word Versus Deed: Resetting the Scales to a Biblical Balance. Crossway. ISBN 9781433531125.
- Litfin, A. Duane (2015). Paul's Theology of Preaching: The Apostle's Challenge to the Art of Persuasion in Ancient Corinth (Revised and expanded ed.). InterVarsity Press. ISBN 9780830898558.

Academic offices
Preceded by J. Richard Chase	President of Wheaton College; 1993–2010	Succeeded by Philip Ryken
