= Alliance of Confessing Evangelicals =

Non-profit organization in the USA

Logo of the Alliance of Confessing Evangelicals

The Alliance of Confessing Evangelicals is an organization of Christian individuals that believes evangelicals have largely forgotten the foundations of the Christian Gospel and is dedicated to calling on the Protestant churches, especially those that call themselves Reformed, to return to the principles of the Protestant Reformation.

To advance its mission, the Alliance produces a range of media and educational resources. These include print publications, online articles, and radio broadcasts such as The Bible Study Hour, Every Last Word, and Dr. Barnhouse & the Bible). In addition, the organization sponsors conferences, including the Philadelphia Conference on Reformed Theology, the Princeton Regional Conference on Reformed Theology, and initiatives like the Reformation Societies, aimed at teaching the Reformed version of the Christian message.

The alliance promotes the traditional doctrines of the Protestant Reformation, particularly Calvinism, in response to a perception that "the light of the Reformation has been significantly dimmed." It has been branded as "exclusivist" because of its focus on Reformed thought. The alliance has Anglican, Baptist, Christian Reformed, and Presbyterian supporters.

The alliance was formed in 1994 out of what was known as Evangelical Ministries when James Montgomery Boice, then senior pastor of Tenth Presbyterian Church in Philadelphia and teacher on The Bible Study Hour radio program, called together a group of like-minded pastors and theologians from a variety of denominations to unite in a common cause to help revive a passion "for the truth of the Gospel" within the church.

On April 17–20, 1996, the alliance came together in Cambridge, Massachusetts, to draw up a statement that would be called the Cambridge Declaration. Signatories included R. C. Sproul, David F. Wells, and Michael Horton.

The Alliance of Confessing Evangelicals is headquartered in Lancaster, Pennsylvania.
