= Urban T. Holmes Jr. =

American historian (1900–1972)

Urban Tigner Holmes Jr. (July 13, 1900 – May 12, 1972) was an American scholar focusing on medieval literature and Romance philology.

The son of Commander Urban T. Holmes, United States Navy, Holmes was born in Washington, D.C. In 1916, he enrolled at the U.S. Naval Academy only to withdraw the following year for health reasons. In 1917, he began schooling at the University of Pennsylvania, where he studied Greek, Russian, Sanskrit, and Old French. After graduating with a Bachelors in 1920, Holmes continued his doctoral studies at Harvard and La Sorbonne. While at the Sorbonne, Holmes studied under scholars such as Joseph Bédier and Mario Roques.

Holmes taught at the University of Western Ontario and the University of Missouri before settling down at the University of North Carolina at Chapel Hill in 1925. By 1945, he was the Kenan Professor of Romance Philology.

Urban T. Holmes was recognized both nationally and internationally for his scholarship. In 1950, he became a Chevalier de la Légion d'honneur. This was followed by becoming a Member of the Royal Archeological Institute (1961), a fellow of the Royal Numismatic Society (1961), a fellow of the American Numismatic Society (1962), and a fellow of the Royal Society of Antiquaries (1967).

Among his most renowned works are his History of Old French Literature (1937) and Daily Living in the Twelfth Century (1952). The publication of his work Chrétien, Troyes, and the Grail (1959, co-authored with Sister Amelia Klenke) introduced his very controversial Judeo-Christian Grail theory.

His son Urban T. Holmes III (1930–1981) was a prominent Episcopal priest, theologian, and academic during the twentieth century.

== Bibliography ==
  - Medieval studies in honor of Urban Tigner Holmes, Jr. (University of North Carolina Press, 1965)
- Samuel Pepys in Paris and Other Essays (1954)
- A History of Old French Literature from the Origins to 1300 (1962)
- Daily Living in the Twelfth Century (1964)
