= Philip Ryken =

American Presbyterian minister and theologian (born 1966)

The Reverend Philip Ryken
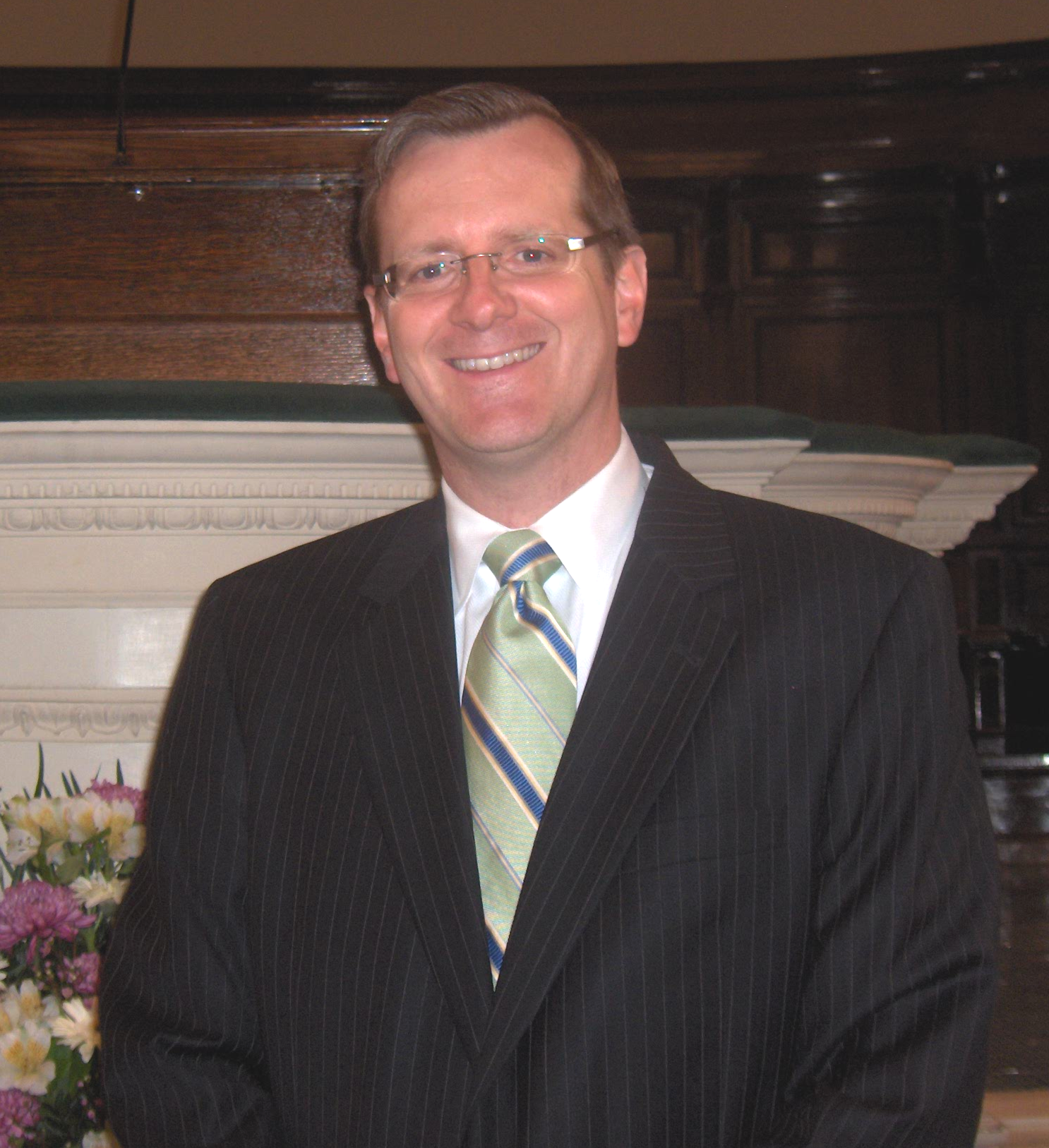
- Ryken in front of the pulpit of Tenth Presbyterian Church, 2010

8th President of Wheaton College
- Incumbent
- Assumed office July 1, 2010
- Preceded by: Duane Litfin

Personal details
- Born: Philip Graham Ryken; September 29, 1966 (age 60)
- Spouse: Lisa (m. 1987)
- Parent: Leland Ryken (father)
- Education: Wheaton College (BA); Westminster Theological Seminary (MDiv); University of Oxford (DPhil)

Ecclesiastical career
- Religion: Christianity (Presbyterian)
- Church: Presbyterian Church in America
- Congregations: Tenth Presbyterian Church

Academic background
- Thesis: Thomas Boston (1676–1732) as Preacher of the Fourfold State (1995)

Academic work
- Discipline: Theology
- Sub-discipline: Biblical theology; historical theology
- School or tradition: Evangelicalism; Presbyterianism
- Institutions: Wheaton College

Philip Graham Ryken (born 1966) is an American theologian, Presbyterian minister, and academic administrator. He is the eighth president of Wheaton College in Wheaton, Illinois.

== Early life and education ==
Ryken was born on September 29, 1966. He received a Bachelor of Arts degree in English literature and philosophy from Wheaton College in 1988. He completed a Master of Divinity degree from Westminster Theological Seminary in 1992 and a Doctor of Philosophy degree in historical theology from the University of Oxford in 1995.

== Professional life ==
Ryken is an ordained teaching elder in the Presbyterian Church in America. He joined the pastoral staff of historic Tenth Presbyterian Church in Philadelphia in 1995 and was elevated to the position of senior minister upon the death of James Boice in 2000. In February 2010, the board of trustees at Wheaton College announced his selection as the college's eighth president, succeeding the retiring Duane Litfin. Ryken took office on July 1, 2010, and was formally inaugurated on September 17, 2010, at Edman Chapel.

He is a member of the Alliance of Confessing Evangelicals, serving as a member of the alliance council, which features his expository preaching on its weekly national radio and internet broadcast, Every Last Word.

== Scholarship ==
He has written over thirty books on a wide variety of Christian subjects, including:

- Art for God's Sake: A Call to Recover the Arts
- Written in Stone: The Ten Commandments and Today's Moral Crisis
- The Doctrines of Grace: Rediscovering the Evangelical Gospel with James Montgomery Boice and R. C. Sproul
- Discovering God in Stories from the Bible

Ryken has also coauthored a series of commentaries on individual books of the Bible with R. Kent Hughes. Ryken and his father, literary scholar Leland Ryken, have collaborated to produce a study Bible, and the father-son team worked with James Wilhoit to write Ryken's Bible Handbook, which focuses on the literary genres and styles in each book of the Bible.

== Criticism ==
In July 2026, The Roys Report published an investigation reporting that Ryken had been formally censured by the Philadelphia Presbytery of the Presbyterian Church in America (PCA) in 2017 for his handling of abuse allegations against Paul Jones, the longtime music director at Tenth Presbyterian Church, where Ryken served as senior minister from 2001 to 2010. According to the report, the PCA concluded that Ryken and other church leaders had failed to conduct an adequate investigation, withheld information from the congregation, and prioritized the church's institutional reputation over the welfare of abuse victims. The article also cited a later GRACE (Godly Response to Abuse in the Christian Environment) investigation, which concluded that the church's response allowed Jones to continue abusive behavior. The report further alleged that Ryken demonstrated a similar pattern while serving as president of Wheaton College by declining to publicly disclose allegations against a former administrator accused of sexual abuse. According to Wheaton College, Ryken informed the board of trustees of the PCA censure, accepted the denomination's admonition, and publicly apologized for failing to provide sufficient pastoral oversight, although one abuse survivor disputed the college's characterization of Ryken's response.

In October 2026, dozens of protestors gathered in a park near Wheaton College and marched onto the campus demanding Ryken's resignation based on an alleged coverup of sexual misconduct by former Wheaton administrator Dennis Massaro.

== Personal life ==
Ryken is the son of the Christian literary scholar and Wheaton professor emeritus Leland Ryken. Ryken met his wife, Lisa, while the two were students at Wheaton. They were married after their junior year. The couple have five children, and reside in Wheaton. He is known to enjoy basketball, soccer, golf, and poetry.

== Works ==
=== Books ===
- Ryken, Philip G. (2001). The Message of Salvation: by God's grace, for God's glory. Downers Grove, IL: InterVarsity Press. ISBN 978-0-830-82404-5. OCLC 48123211.
- ——— (2001). Jeremiah and Lamentations: from sorrow to hope. Preaching the Word. Wheaton, IL: Crossway Books. ISBN 978-1-581-34167-6. OCLC 44885114.
- ——— (2002). The Doctrines of Grace: rediscovering the evangelical Gospel. Wheaton, IL: Crossway Books. ISBN 978-1-581-34299-4. OCLC 48550967.
- ———; Boice, James Montgomery (2002). Jesus on Trial. Wheaton, IL: Crossway Books. ISBN 978-1-581-34401-1. OCLC 48649754.
- ———; Thomas, Derek W. H.; Duncan, J. Ligon, III (2003). Give Praise to God: a vision for reforming worship : celebrating the legacy of James Montgomery Boice. Phillipsburg, NJ: P & R Publishing. ISBN 978-0-8755-2553-2. OCLC 52587635.
- ——— (2005). Galatians. Reformed Expository Commentary. Phillipsburg, NJ: P & R Publishing. ISBN 978-0-875-52782-6. OCLC 58720713.
- ——— (2006). Art for God's sake: a call to recover the arts. Phillipsburg, NJ: P & R Publishing. ISBN 978-1-5963-8007-3. OCLC 61684233.
- ———; Ryken, Leland (2007). The Literary Study Bible: ESV: English Standard version, containing the Old and New Testaments. Wheaton, IL: Crossway Books. ISBN 978-1-581-34808-8. OCLC 123284869.
- ——— (2011). King Solomon: The Temptations of Money, Sex, and Power. Crossway. ISBN 9781433521546.
- ———; Davis, Jeffry C., eds. (2012). Liberal arts for the Christian life. Wheaton, IL: Crossway Books. ISBN 978-1-433-52394-6. OCLC 793539869.
- ———; Davis, Jeffry C.; Wilson, Todd A. (2012). Pastors in the Classics: timeless lessons on life and ministry from world literature. Grand Rapids, MI: Baker Books. ISBN 978-0-801-07197-3. OCLC 729346781.
- ——— (2012). Loving the Way Jesus Loves. Crossway. ISBN 9781433524790.
- ——— (2013). Kingdom, Come!. Crossway. ISBN 9781433534072.
- ——— (2014). Loving Jesus More. Crossway. ISBN 9781433534089.
- ——— (2016). When Trouble Comes. Crossway. ISBN 9781433549731.
- ——— (2017). The Messiah Comes to Middle-Earth: Images of Christ's Threefold Office in The Lord of the Rings. InterVarsity Press. ISBN 9780830853724.
- ——— (2019). The Love of Loves in the Song of Songs. Crossway. ISBN 9781433562563.
- ——— (2023). Beauty Is Your Destiny: How the Promise of Splendor Changes Everything. Crossway. ISBN 9781433587757.
- ——— (2024). I Have My Doubts: How God Can Use Your Uncertainty to Reawaken Your Faith. Crossway. ISBN 9781433593413.

Religious titles
Preceded by James Montgomery Boice	Senior Minister of Tenth Presbyterian Church; 2000–2010	Succeeded by Liam Goligher
Academic offices
Preceded by Duane Litfin	President of Wheaton College; 2010–present	Incumbent
