= Urban T. Holmes III =

Urban Tigner Holmes III (June 12, 1930 – August 6, 1981) was an Episcopal priest, theologian, and academic during the twentieth century. He was the son of Urban T. Holmes Jr. and Margaret Allan Gemmell Holmes. Following studies at the University of North Carolina, he studied for the priesthood at the former Philadelphia Divinity School. He served as dean of the School of Theology of the University of the South from 1973 until his death. His biggest accomplishment while in Sewanee was the establishment of the Education for Ministry program.

== Selected publications ==
- The Sexual Person: The Church's Role in Human Sexual Development (Seabury, 1970)
- The Future Shape of Ministry: A Theological Projection (1971)
- The Expression of the Ineffable (Dissertation, Marquette University, 1973)
- To Speak of God: Theology for Beginners, Seabury Press, 1974
- Confirmation: The Celebration of Maturity in Christ (1975)
- To Be a Priest: Perspectives on Vocation and Ordination, HarperCollins Publishers, 1975 (co-editor with Robert E. Terwilliger)
- Male and Female: Christian Approaches to Sexuality, Seabury Press, 1976 (co-editor with Ruth Tiffany Barnhouse)
- The Priest in Community: Exploring the Roots of Ministry, Seabury Press, 1978
- Ministry and Imagination (New York: Seabury, 1976)
- A History of Christian Spirituality: An Analytical Introduction (Seabury, 1980)
- Ministry and Imagination HarperCollins, 1981
- Turning to Christ: A Theology of Renewal and Evangelization, Seabury Press, 1981
- A History of Christian Spirituality: An Analytical Introduction, HarperCollins Publishers, 1981
- What is Anglicanism?, "The Anglican Studies Series", Morehouse Publishing, 1982
- Christian Believing, "The Church's Teaching Series", HarperCollins Publishers, 1984 (co-author with John H. Westerhoff III)
