= James Montgomery Boice =

American theologian and minister (1938-2000)

- Born: July 7, 1938; Pittsburgh, Pennsylvania, U.S.
- Died: June 15, 2000 (aged 61); Philadelphia, Pennsylvania, U.S.
- Education: Harvard University (BA); Princeton Theological Seminary (BDiv); University of Basel (ThD)
- Occupations: Theologian; minister; author

James Montgomery Boice (July 7, 1938 – June 15, 2000) was an American Reformed Christian theologian, Bible teacher, author, and speaker known for his writing on the authority of Scripture and the defense of Biblical inerrancy. He was also the Senior Minister of Tenth Presbyterian Church in Philadelphia from 1968 until his death.

Boice also served as Chairman of the International Council on Biblical Inerrancy for over ten years and was a founding member of the Alliance of Confessing Evangelicals.

== Biography ==
Born on July 7, 1938, in Pittsburgh, Pennsylvania, James Montgomery Boice was a Bible teacher, author, and spokesman in the United States and around the world on the topics of Scriptural authority and inerrancy. He was also the pastor of Philadelphia's Tenth Presbyterian Church from 1968 to 2000.

Under Boice's leadership and teaching of Christian beliefs, Tenth Presbyterian Church came to be seen as a model for ministry in America's northeastern inner cities, offering a range of classes, fellowship groups, and specialised outreach ministries to the physically sick, women in crisis, and the homeless. In 1983, he founded City Center Academy (now The City School), a college-preparatory Christian school primarily serving minority residents of the church's neighborhood.

Boice was active in a number of initiatives beyond Tenth Street Presbyterian. He served as Chairman of the International Council on Biblical Inerrancy (ICBI) from its founding in 1977 until the completion of its work in 1988. ICBI produced three creedal documents, published books, conducted "Authority of Scripture" seminars, and sponsored the large lay "Congress on the Bible I," which met in Washington, D.C., in September 1987. Boice also served on the Board of Bible Study Fellowship. He helped develop the Alliance of Confessing Evangelicals, being "formed in 1994 out of what was known as Evangelical Ministries when James Boice, then senior pastor of Tenth Presbyterian Church in Philadelphia and teacher on The Bible Study Hour radio program, called together a group of like-minded pastors and theologians from a variety of denominations to unite in a common cause to help revive a passion "for the truth of the Gospel" within the church."

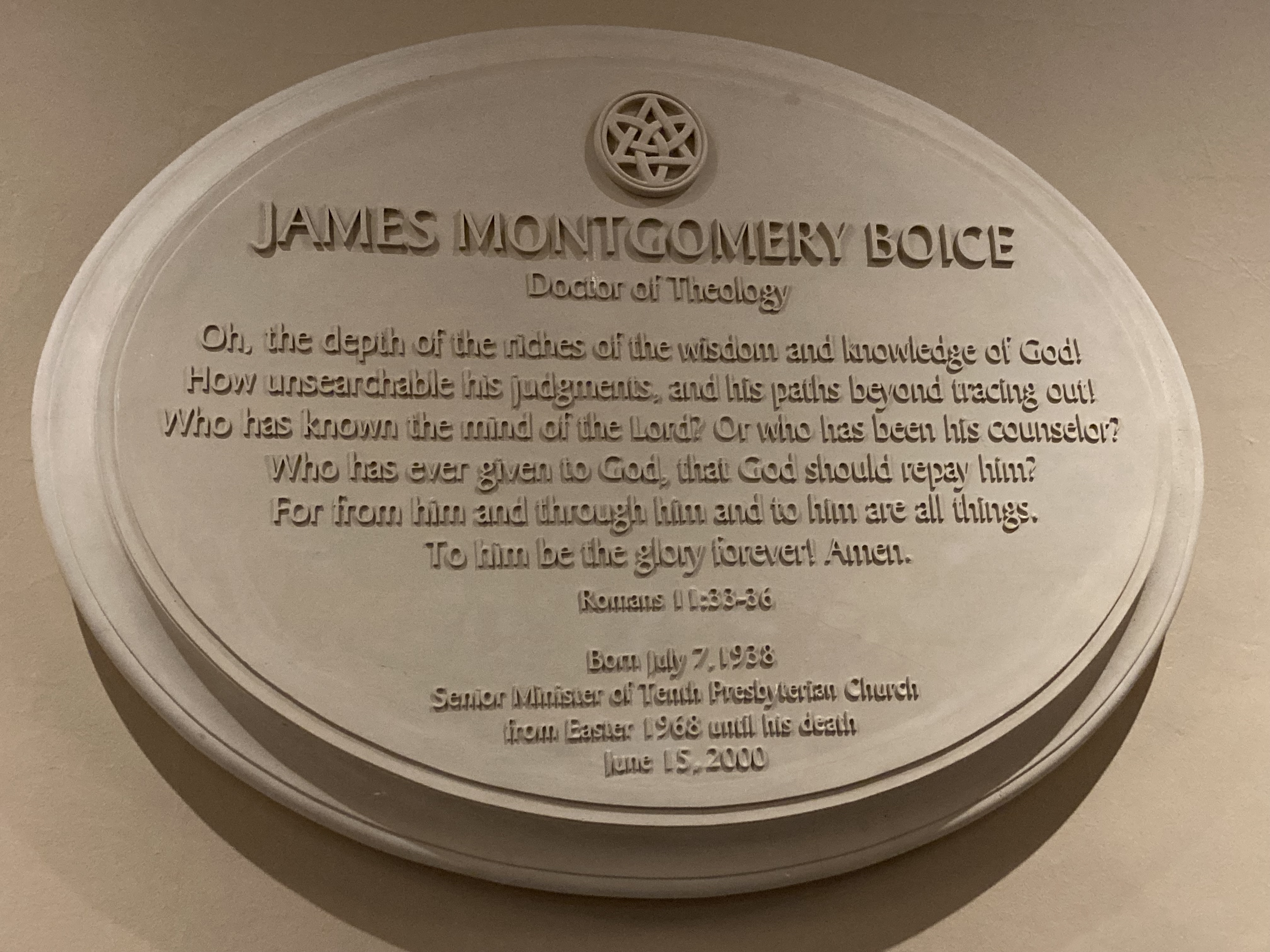
Plaque of James Montgomery Boice at Tenth Presbyterian Church

Over his lifetime, Boice journeyed to more than thirty countries and teaching from the Bible in England, France, Switzerland, Canada, Japan, Australia, Guatemala, Korea and Saudi Arabia. While pursuing his doctoral studies in Switzerland, he started a Bible study group that eventually developed into the Basel Christian Fellowship.

Boice received a diploma from The Stony Brook School (1956), an A.B. from Harvard University (1960), a B.D. from Princeton Theological Seminary (1963), a Th.D from the University of Basel in Switzerland (1966), and a D.D., (honorary) from the Theological Seminary of the Reformed Episcopal Church (1982).

He died of liver cancer in Philadelphia, on June 15, 2000. Boice was married to Linda Ann Boice (born McNamara), on June 9, 1962, in Montclair, New Jersey. They had three daughters together, Elizabeth, Heather, and Jennifer Boice.

== Writings ==
Boice was a prolific author, having published over 50 different works, including a collection of hymns. Some of his popular books include:

- Foundations of the Christian Faith (ISBN 0-87784-991-9)
- The Doctrines of Grace: Rediscovering the Essentials of Evangelicalism (ISBN 1-58134-299-3)
- Christ's Call to Discipleship (ISBN 0-8254-2074-1)
- Renewing Your Mind in a Mindless World: Learning to Think and Act Biblically (ISBN 0-8254-2071-7)
- Parables of Jesus (ISBN 0-8024-0163-5)
- What Ever Happened to the Gospel of Grace? (ISBN 1-58134-237-3)
- Dealing With Bible Problems: Alleged Errors and Contradictions in the Bible (ISBN 0-87508-478-8)
- Ordinary Men Called by God: A Study of Abraham, Moses, and David (ISBN 0-8254-2075-X)

=== Expositional commentaries ===
Boice also published many volumes of commentaries on books of the Bible, which each were edited from his spoken teachings:

- Genesis (3 volumes; ISBN 0-8010-1161-2, ISBN 0-8010-1162-0, ISBN 0-8010-1163-9)
- Joshua (ISBN 0-8010-1283-X)
- Nehemiah (ISBN 0-8010-1282-1)
- Psalms (3 volumes; ISBN 0-8010-6578-X, ISBN 0-8010-6585-2, ISBN 0-8010-6586-0)
- Daniel (ISBN 0-8010-1258-9)
- The Minor Prophets (2 volumes; ISBN 0-8010-1232-5, ISBN 0-8010-1233-3)
- Gospel of Matthew (2 volumes; ISBN 0-8010-1201-5, ISBN 0-8010-1202-3)
- The Sermon on the Mount (ISBN 0-8010-1248-1)
- The Gospel of John (5 volumes; ISBN 0-8010-6577-1, ISBN 0-8010-6580-1, ISBN 0-8010-6581-X, ISBN 0-8010-6587-9, ISBN 0-8010-6588-7)
- Acts (ISBN 0-8010-1137-X)
- Romans (4 volumes; ISBN 0-8010-6579-8, ISBN 0-8010-6582-8, ISBN 0-8010-6583-6, ISBN 0-8010-6584-4)
- Ephesians (ISBN 0-8010-1153-1)
- Philippians (ISBN 0-8010-1190-6)
- The Epistles of John (ISBN 0-8010-1257-0)

Boice is also known for contributing his commentary of the Epistle of Galatians to "The Expositor's Bible Commentary" (ISBN 0-31036520-1)

== See also ==
- Alliance of Confessing Evangelicals

Religious titles
Preceded by Mariano Di Gangi	Senior Minister of Tenth Presbyterian Church; 1968–2000	Succeeded by Philip G. Ryken
