= John Boardman (merchant) =

John Boardman (1758–1813) was a merchant and one of the earliest settlers of Troy, New York.

Boardman was born in Preston, Litchfield Country, Connecticut, the fourth of a brood of six. In 1788, he acquired a plot in farmland that had been subdivided by the Van der Heyden family in the previous year. Other settlers of his generation included Stephen Ashley, Benjamin Covell, Samuel Gale, Benjamin Smith, Philip Heartt, Anthony Goodspeed, Mahlon Taylor, Ephraim Morgan, and Ebenezer and Samuel Wilson. As one writer later reminisced of these pioneers, “they were few in number, and possessed but little substance; but they were men of courage and activity…. They were men of shrewd minds. They saw that water power here abounded – and that River navigation to this point was easy. They judged that with its natural advantages, their enterprise could not fail.”

On the night of January 5, 1789, Boardman and other residents gathered in Ashley's Inn voted to give the settlement a new designation. Henceforth the town of Vanderheyden would be known as Troy. Thanks to the industry of entrepreneurs like Boardman, Troy grew steadily. It was incorporated as a town in 1791, and upgraded to a village in 1801. Three years after his death, Troy was chartered as a city.

Boardman formed several mercantile partnerships in the course of his career. Morgan, Boardman & Coit was established as early as 1790, and his enterprise went through further permutations as Morgan & Boardman, and later Boardman & Hillhouse. Boardman built a house on the west side of Second Street in Troy on the Hudson River in New York. He served in a number of official capacities in the early history of Troy. He was among the first fire wardens, appointed to the office in 1799, 1801, and 1803, and served as assessor for the Second Ward in 1806.

In 1800 he married Clarinda Starbuck of Nantucket (1773–1846), the daughter of Daniel and Mary (Folger) Starbuck of Nantucket. Through the Folger side of the family, Clarinda was related to both Benjamin Franklin and Lucretia Mott. Although Clarinda had been raised a Quaker, she had joined the Presbyterian Church when she married John, who was himself of Puritan stock. Their son, Henry Augustus Boardman (1808–1880) would become pastor of the Tenth Presbyterian Church in Philadelphia, and a denominational leader.
