= Christ Church, Richmond =

Coordinates: 51.4673°N 0.2959°W

former Christ Church, Richmond
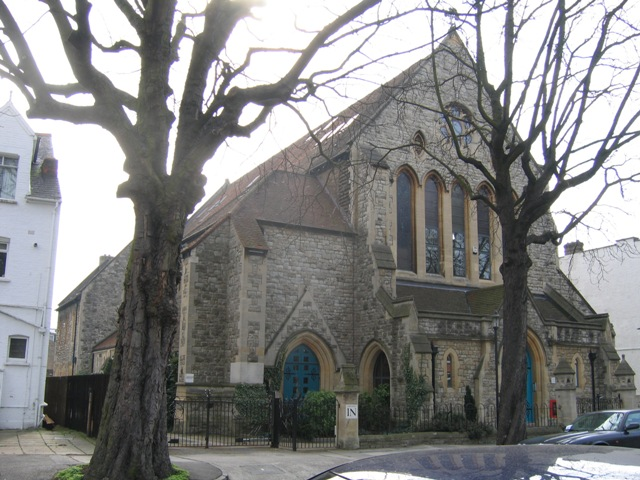
- former Christ Church, Richmond
- Location: Kew Road, Richmond, in the London Borough of Richmond upon Thames
- Denomination: Church of England

History
- Status: Church use ceased in 1986
- Founded: 14 October 1893
- Consecrated: 29 June 1894

Architecture
- Functional status: Converted into residential flats
- Architect: Arthur Blomfield
- Architectural type: Gothic Revival architecture
- Completed: 1894
- Closed: 1986

Specifications
- Capacity: 750 seated

Administration
- Diocese: Southwark

Christ Church is a former Church of England church on Kew Road in Richmond, in the London Borough of Richmond upon Thames. Its architect was Arthur Blomfield who, thirty years earlier, had designed another Anglican church of the same name in neighbouring East Sheen.

The church building opened in 1894, the congregation's founding members being 1,300 Anglican members of St John the Divine, Richmond who objected to St John's moving away from an Evangelical style of worship and towards a more Catholic direction. They had left St John's in the 1870s and started worshipping at an iron church on Park Lane, Richmond that had previously been used by the Baptist congregation of Duke Street Church prior to the opening of its own church building in 1870.

The foundation stone of the new building was laid by Mary, Duchess of Teck. The church's first vicar, from 1893 to 1908, was the Rev. Alfred Ernest Foster, who had been priest-in-charge at the temporary iron church since 1891.

A large hall was built at the back of the church in 1895–96.

The church closed in 1986, the congregation having merged with that of Holy Trinity Church, Sheen Park, Richmond, in 1977. The building has been converted into 15 residential flats.

== Sources ==
Church, Judith (2006). "Sir Arthur Blomfield, Victorian Architect". Richmond History: Journal of the Richmond Local History Society. 27: 61–62. ISSN 0263-0958.
