= Liam Goligher =

Scottish Presbyterian minister and author

- Born: William Liam Goligher; Glasgow, Scotland
- Education: Irish Baptist College; Reformed Theological Seminary
- Occupations: Presbyterian minister, author
- Years active: 1973–2024
- Organizations: Duke Street Church; Tenth Presbyterian Church
- Spouse: Christine Nora Hughes (m. 1972)
- Children: 5

William Liam Goligher (known as Liam Goligher) is a Scottish minister, author, and former pastor associated with Reformed evangelical and Presbyterian churches. He was the senior minister of Tenth Presbyterian Church in Philadelphia from 2011 to 2023.

== Early life and education ==
Liam Goligher was born in Glasgow, Scotland to a Protestant Christian family. He graduated from the Irish Baptist College with a degree in theology in 1973, and earned a Doctor of Ministry degree from Reformed Theological Seminary in Jackson, Mississippi in 2004.

== Career and ministry ==
Goligher served as pastor of churches in Scotland, Ireland, and Canada before moving to England. He was Senior Minister of Duke Street Church, an independent Reformed evangelical church in Richmond, London, from 2000 to 2011. He was involved in Bible teaching, evangelistic ministry among university students, conference speaking, and radio broadcasting in the United Kingdom. He also participated in various organizations including Keswick Ministries, Glasgow Pregnancy Crisis Centre, Esperanza Trust, and Keychange Charity.

In 2011, Goligher was selected to be the Senior Minister of Tenth Presbyterian Church in Philadelphia, Pennsylvania, and served in that position until 2023. While at Tenth Presbyterian Church, Goligher participated in public theological debates over the Trinity and Complementarianism.

In 2023, public records revealed that he had pleaded guilty in 2014 to violating a Lancaster, Pennsylvania municipal ordinance prohibiting sexual acts in city parks. Following disclosure of the 2014 conviction, Tenth Presbyterian Church referred the matter to the Philadelphia Presbytery of the Presbyterian Church in America (PCA) for investigation. Goligher resigned from Tenth Presbyterian Church in 2023. As part of the Presbyterian Church in America (PCA) judicial proceeding, he pled guilty in 2024 to adult clergy sexual abuse and other offenses, and was barred from serving as a minister in the PCA.

== Personal life ==
Goligher married Christine Nora Hughes in 1972, and has five children.

== Publications ==
Goligher has published several books, including A Window on Tomorrow (1994), The Fellowship of the King (2003), The Jesus Gospel (2006), Joseph: The Hidden Hand of God (2008), and A Man Just Like Us: Elijah (2014).
