= Donald Barnhouse =

American pastor and author (1895–1960)

Donald Grey Barnhouse on the cover of Eternity magazine in its memorial issue tribute to the magazine's founder, March 1961

Donald Grey Barnhouse (March 28, 1895 – November 5, 1960), was an American Christian preacher, pastor, theologian, radio pioneer, and writer. He was pastor of the Tenth Presbyterian Church in Philadelphia from 1927 to his death in 1960. The Bible Study Hour, his pioneering radio program continues, now known as Dr. Barnhouse & the Bible.

== Career ==
Barnhouse pastored the Tenth Presbyterian Church in Philadelphia from 1927 until his death in 1960. He was a pioneer in preaching over the radio; his program was known as The Bible Study Hour. His broadcasts were taped and today the program continues to air as Dr. Barnhouse & the Bible. In 1949, he began a weekly, in-depth study of the Book of Romans on his program, which lasted until he died in 1960. He wrote many articles and books. For many years, Barnhouse held a Bible class on Monday evenings at Saint Luke's Lutheran Church near Times Square in Manhattan, which lasted until his death.

In 1931, Barnhouse began publishing Revelation, a magazine which published his sermons, expositions, and religious interpretations of current events. Revelation was published until 1950. Barnhouse also founded Eternity magazine, a monthly publication, in 1950 and was the editor-in-chief. He wrote the "Window on the World" column for each issue between 1931 and 1960 and discussed contemporary concerns from a Biblical perspective. In September 1956, Eternity magazine published his article, "Are the Seventh-day Adventists Christians?" He answered affirmatively, but in the past he had excluded them, saying they were not Christians for some of their teachings.

The article was described as a "blockbuster" by his wife, Margaret Barnhouse, in her biography, That Man Barnhouse (1983). She wrote that the "reaction was immediate: outraged canceling of subscriptions or grateful commendation because [he] had the courage to... admit he had been wrong in the past about the Adventists." Along with fellow evangelical Walter Martin, Barnhouse argued that the "Adventists hold all the basic doctrines of Christianity" with some heterodox teachings. Eternity published a memorial issue tribute and a cover story of Barnhouse shortly after his death.

C. Everett Koop, the former U.S. Surgeon General, attended the Tenth Presbyterian Church for more than 20 years. He said of Barnhouse:

"His authoritative voice held my attention, his physical appearance was arresting, and his preaching was teaching of the highest intellectual order... I always marveled at the simplicity of the faith of this very intelligent and learned man."

== Personal life ==
Barnhouse was born March 28, 1895, in Watsonville, California. His parents were Theodore and Jennie Carmichael Barnhouse. After graduating high school, he enrolled at the Bible Institute of Los Angeles, in 1912. He also studied at the University of Chicago and Princeton Theological Seminary in Princeton, New Jersey. He enlisted in the U.S. Army in 1917 before completing his studies at Princeton. First Lieutenant Barnhouse of the Aviation Section of the Signal Corps was ordained in April 1918 by the Presbyterian Church in the United States of America. In 1933, Dallas Theological Seminary awarded him an honorary Doctor of Divinity (D.D.) degree. Barnhouse was awarded the Doctor of Theology (Th.D.) degree in 1952 by the Aix-en-Provence Reformed Seminary in France, an institution associated with breakaway French Reformed churches that he actively supported.

Barnhouse and the missionary Ruth Tiffany married in 1922. They had four children: sons Donald Jr. and David, and daughters Ruth and Dorothy. His wife Ruth died of cancer in 1944. Several years later, he married his second wife Margaret (née Nuckols) Bell, the widow of Douglas Bell. They lived on an 82-acre (33 ha) farm near Doylestown, Pennsylvania. Donald Barnhouse died in a Philadelphia hospital one month after being diagnosed with a large, malignant brain tumor.

== Works ==
Many of the books authored by Donald Grey Barnhouse have been re-published since his death, some in their tenth or more printing. His works include:

- Acts (1979), Zondervan
- Bible Truth Illustrated (1979), Keats
- The Cross Through the Open Tomb (1961), Eerdmans Publishing
- Genesis (1970), Zondervan, 2 vols.
- God's Methods for Holy Living (1949), Revelation Publications
- Guaranteed Deposits (1949), Revelation Publications
- The Invisible War (1965), Zondervan
- Let Me Illustrate (1967), Revell Publishing
- Revelation (1971), Zondervan
- Romans (1982), Eerdmans Publishing, 4 vols.
- Teaching the Word of Truth (1940), Eerdmans Publishing
- Thessalonians (1977), Zondervan
- Words Fitly Spoken (1969), Tyndale House Publishers
- Your Right to Heaven (1977), Baker Book House
- How to Live a Holy Life (2018) (Excerpt from God's Methods for Holy Living)

== Archives ==
The Presbyterian Historical Society in Philadelphia has a large collection of Barnhouse’s papers including correspondence, photographs and audio records documenting his personal and professional life. The collection includes materials from his media ventures: his broadcasts and the magazines Revelation and Eternity. Sermons, radio scripts, correspondences, articles, and a diary of his personal life are part of the collection. The Barnhouse collection also has photographs of his family, friends, ministry, and travels.

Religious titles
Preceded by Marcus A. Brownson	Senior Pastor of Tenth Presbyterian Church; 1927-1960	Succeeded by Mariano Di Gangi
