= Tenth Presbyterian Church =

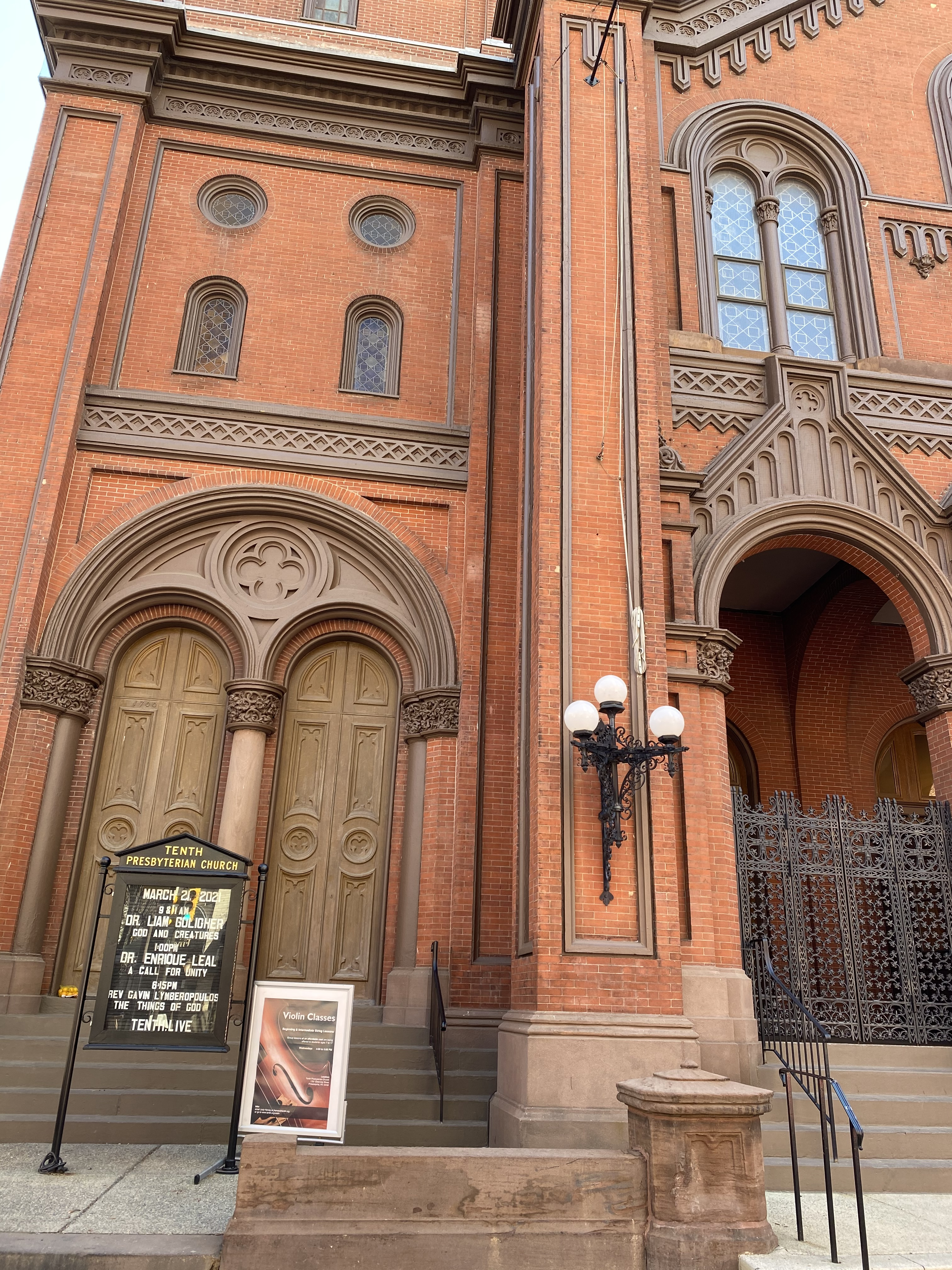
- Current church building

- Location within Philadelphia
- 39°56′49.19″N 75°10′11.52″W
- Location: 17th & Spruce Streets, Philadelphia, Pennsylvania
- Country: United States
- Denomination: Presbyterian Church in America
- Previous denomination: Reformed Presbyterian Church, Evangelical Synod
- Website: www.tenth.org

History
- Former name: West Spruce Street Presbyterian Church
- Status: Open
- Founded: 1829

Architecture
- Architect(s): John McArthur Jr. Frank Miles Day (1893 alterations)
- Architectural type: Lombard Romanesque
- Completed: 1856

Specifications
- Capacity: 1,082
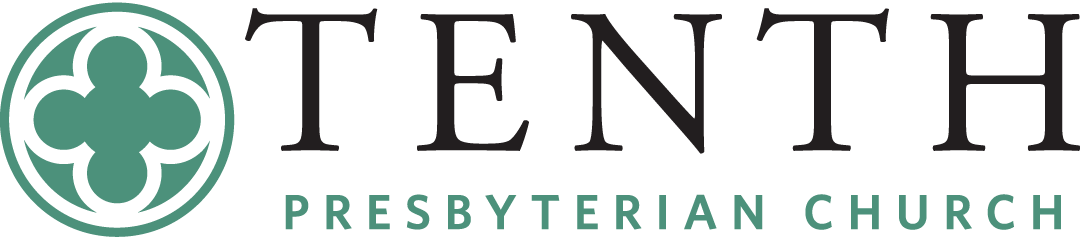

Tenth Presbyterian Church is a congregation located in Center City, Philadelphia, Pennsylvania, United States. Tenth is a part of the Presbyterian Church in America (PCA), a denomination in the Reformed (Calvinist) tradition. It is located at the southwest corner of 17th & Spruce Streets in Philadelphia's Rittenhouse Square neighborhood, in the southwestern quadrant of Center City.

== History ==
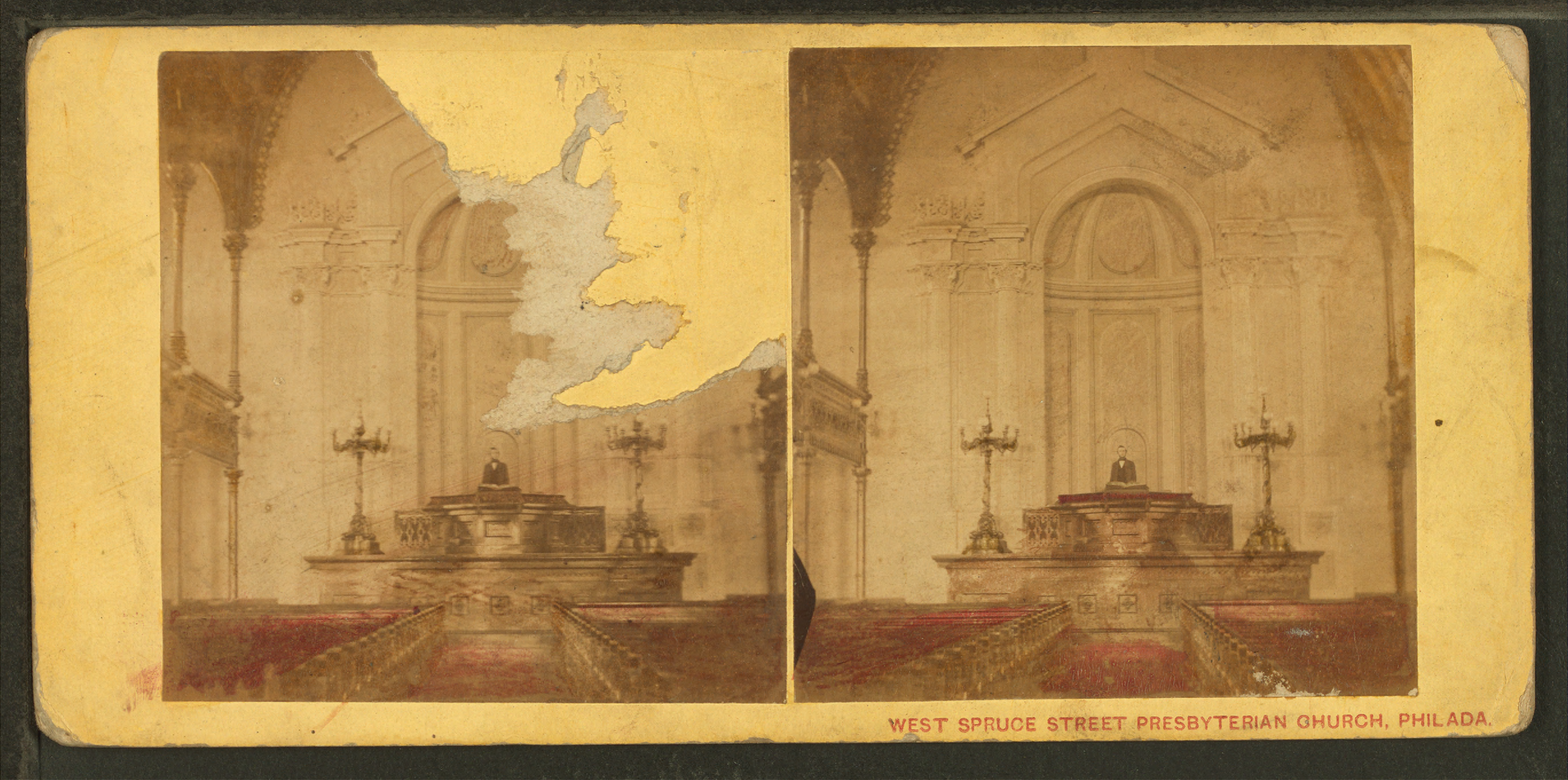
Tenth Presbyterian Church, interior prior to 1893 remodeling.

The original Tenth Presbyterian Church, founded in 1829 as a congregation part of the Presbyterian Church in the United States of America, was located on the northeast corner of 12th & Walnut Streets. It established a daughter church in 1855–1856 called the West Spruce Street Presbyterian Church on the southwest corner of 17th & Spruce Streets. The two churches worked together, with the ministers exchanging pulpits each week. Because of membership decline in the original Tenth Church caused by population shifts, the two churches merged in 1893 at the 17th & Spruce Streets location, taking the name of the older church (Tenth Presbyterian Church).

West Spruce Street/Tenth Church was designed by architect John McArthur Jr., who was a member of the congregation. Its 250-foot (76 m) tower-and-spire was the tallest structure in Philadelphia from 1856 to the erection of the tower of Philadelphia City Hall in 1894, also designed by McArthur. In 1893, architect Frank Miles Day was hired to perform major alterations to the church's exterior and interior decoration. The church's steeple with its 150-foot wooden spire was weakened due to structural decay of the timber frame, and was removed in 1912 due to fears that it would collapse.

The Philadelphia Presbytery (PC-USA) was a conservative bastion during the fundamentalist-modernist controversy of the 1920s and 1930s, and Tenth Presbyterian was no exception. Under the influence of longtime pastor Donald Barnhouse (1927–1960), the congregation became the conservative Presbyterian church in Center City, and it has remained a conservative and evangelical congregation until this day. Under James Montgomery Boice (1968–2000), the congregation continued to be a center of conservative Reformed theology. Tenth membership continued to grow after World War II, and ministry efforts to college students gave the congregation a metropolitan focus.

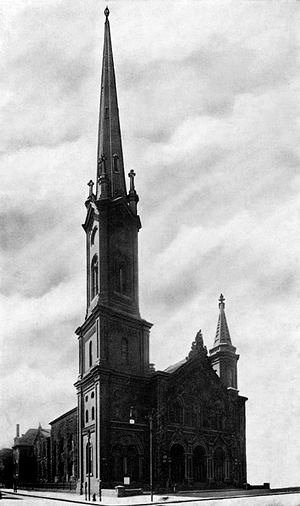
Tenth Church before the removal of the spires in 1912

Under Boice's pastorate, Tenth grew from 350 members to a congregation over 1,200.

In 1979, following a denominational ruling by the United Presbyterian Church in the United States of America requiring congregations to elect both men and women as ruling elder, Tenth Presbyterian left the UPCUSA in 1980, joining the more conservative Reformed Presbyterian Church, Evangelical Synod. Three years afterward, Tenth followed the RPCES into the Presbyterian Church in America (PCA), a church of Southern origin.

After a lengthy property battle, the congregation was allowed to leave the UPCUSA while keeping its Byzantine-style property. Tenth Presbyterian is considered the "big-steeple" PCA congregation in the northeastern United States. The church sponsors an extensive global missions program, and an outreach to the neighborhood includes a strong connection to the rising generation of doctors, interns, and residents attending the medical schools in the neighborhood.

On December 1, 2023, Tenth Presbyterian senior pastor Rev. Dr. William "Liam" Goligher resigned, nine years after pleading guilty to "personal conduct" charges in a park in Lancaster, Pennsylvania, charges disclosed by church watchdog group Anglican Watch. On May 20, 2024, the Philadelphia Presbytery of the Presbyterian Church in America suspended Liam Goligher indefinitely for contumacy - defined by the Presbyterian Church in America as refusing to cooperate in church disciplinary proceedings. Later, Goligher confessed in a formal PCA hearing to adult clergy sexual abuse, and was barred from serving as a PCA minister.

On November 16, 2025, the congregation voted to call Dr. Jonathan Gibson as the church's new Senior Minister. Pending transfer exams and his reception into Philadelphia Presbytery of the Presbyterian Church in America, Dr. Gibson is expected to take on full time duties on June 1, 2026, and be installed as Senior Minister in September 2026.

== Publications ==
=== Tenth Presbyterian Church ===
- Tenth Presbyterian Church of Philadelphia: 175 Years of Thinking and Acting Biblically edited by Philip G. Ryken with contributors Allen C. Guelzo, William S. Barker and Paul S. Jones in celebration of the 175th anniversary of the church. Published in 2004.

== Burials ==
=== Tenth Presbyterian Church ===
The Tenth Presbyterian Church grew out of the Sixth Presbyterian Church, being organized in its session room in March, 1829. It was located on the northeast corner of Twelfth and Walnut Streets and there remained until merged (retaining its name) with its daughter, the West Spruce Street Church, at the corner of Seventeenth and Spruce in 1895. The church's burial ground at 17th and Cherry Streets had been established by what became the Seventh Presbyterian Church in 1808, and was sold to the Tenth Presbyterian Church in 1832. The bodies in this cemetery were removed in May, 1849 to the Woodlands Cemetery, Section C, Lots 498–500. The former burial ground was subsequently sold for redevelopment 1851.

=== Current ===
Currently, there is no traditional burial grounds maintained by Tenth Presbyterian Church.

== Senior Ministers ==
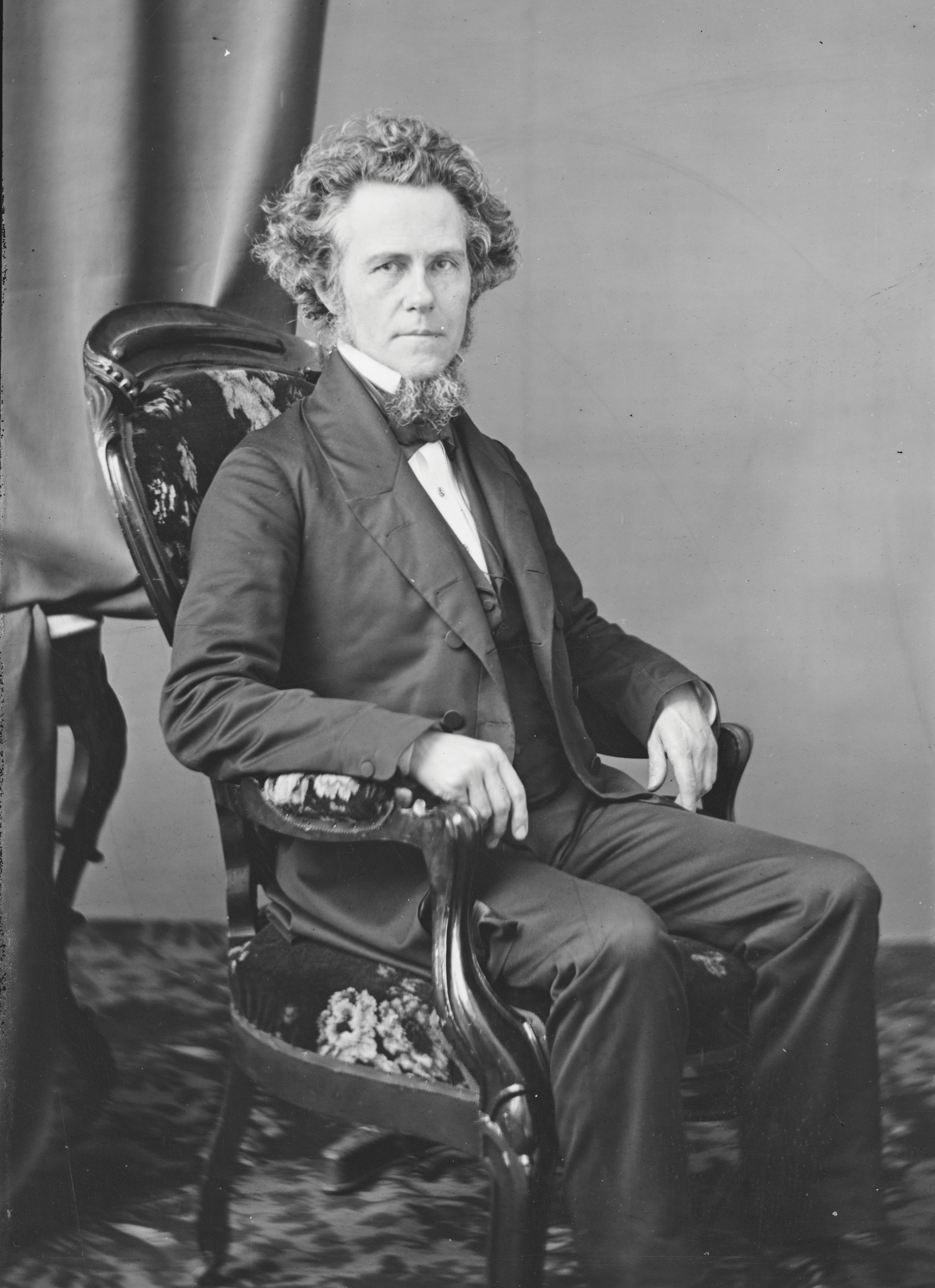
Henry Augustus Boardman

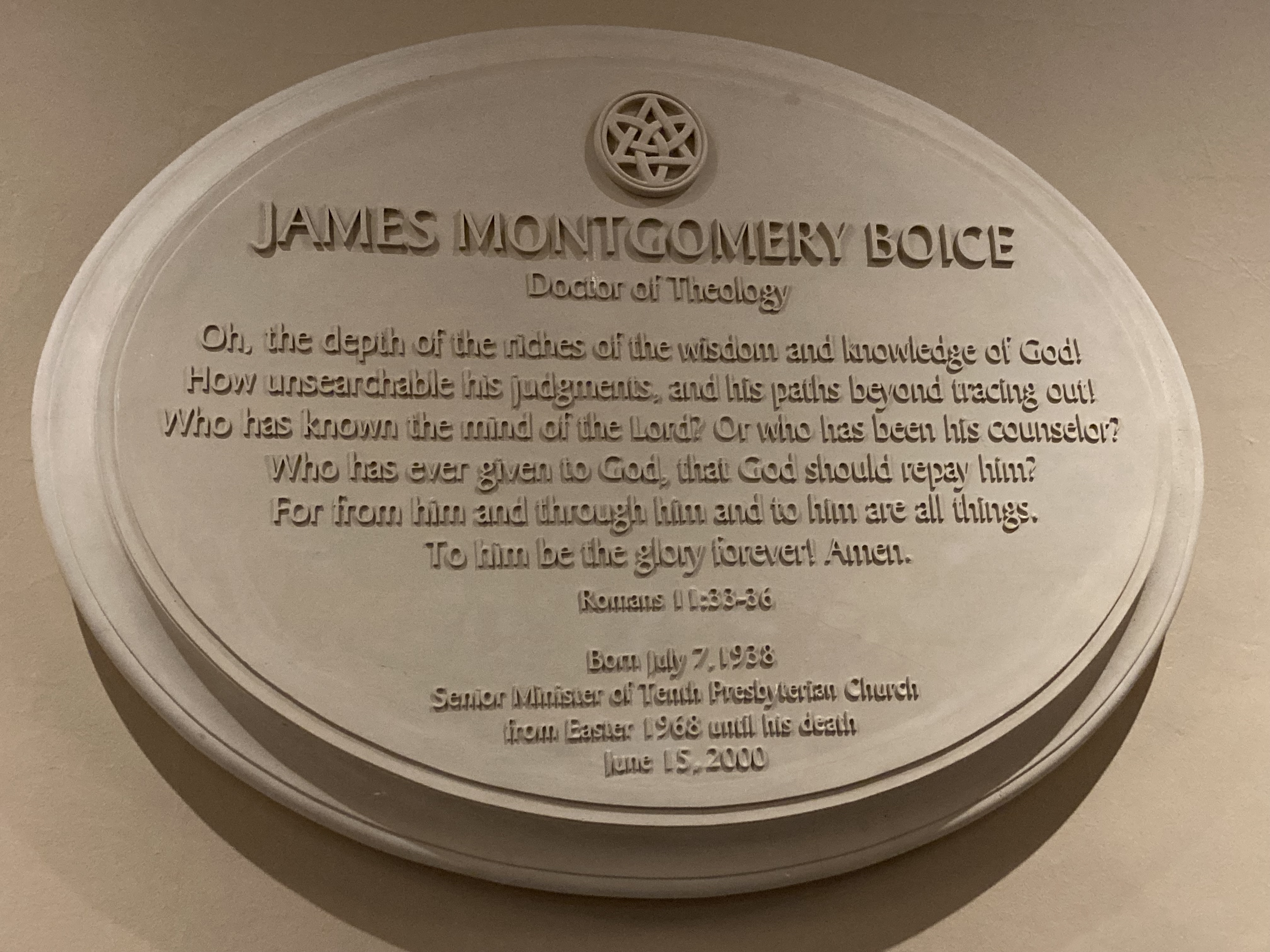
James Montgomery Boice Plaque

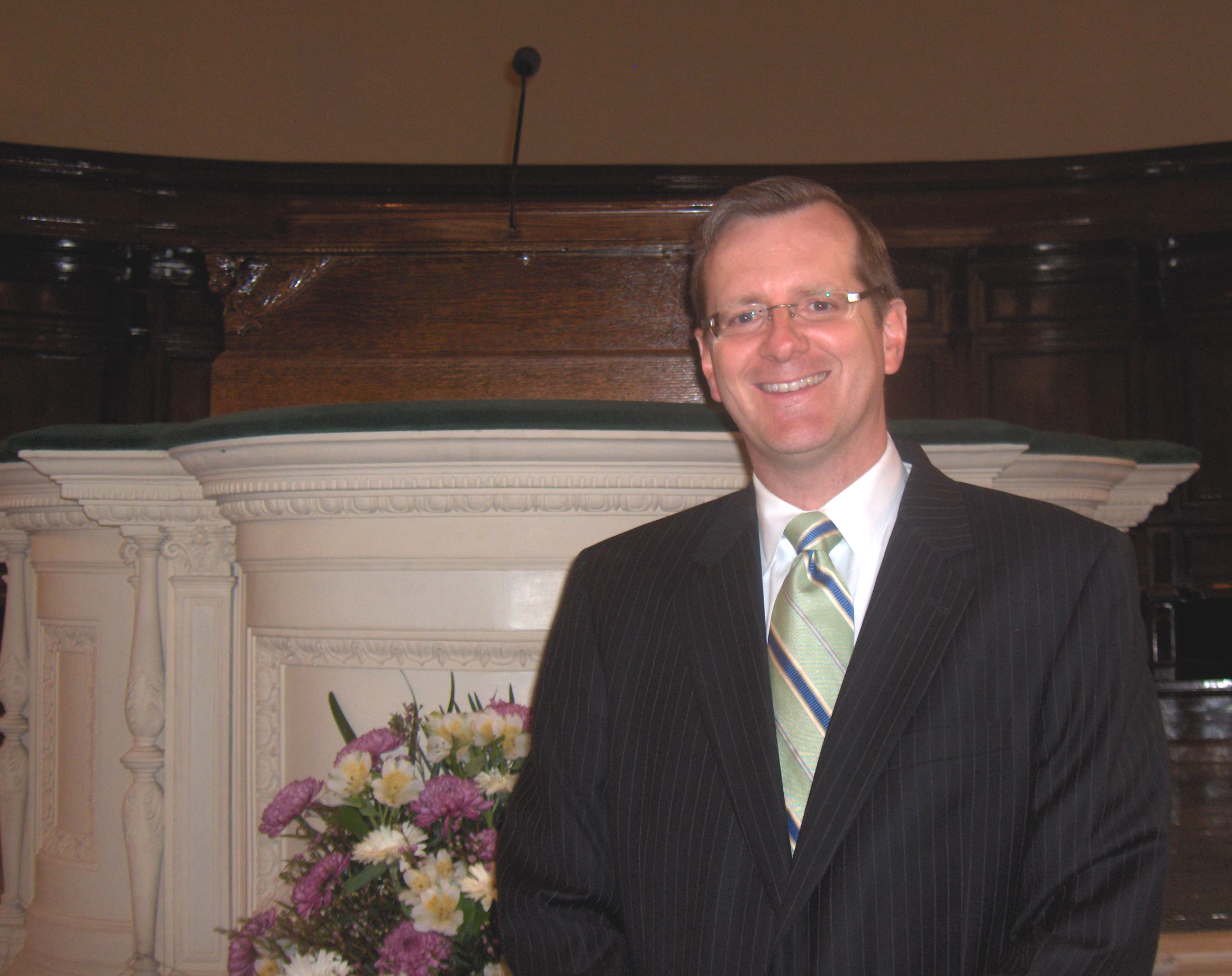
Philip G. Ryken, in front of the pulpit, June 27, 2010

Some notable staff members of the church from its founding include:

- Thomas McAuley, D.D., LL.D. Senior Pastor. 1829–1833
- Henry Augustus Boardman, D.D. Senior Pastor. 1833–1876
- Marcus A. Brownson, D.D. Senior Pastor. 1897–1924
- Donald Grey Barnhouse, Th.D., D.D. Senior Pastor. 1927–1960
- Mariano Di Gangi, D.D. Senior Pastor. 1961–1967
- James Montgomery Boice, Th.D., D.D. Senior Minister. 1968–2000
- Philip G. Ryken, DPhil. Senior Minister. 1995–2010, now president of Wheaton College
- William "Liam" W. Goligher, D.Min. Senior Minister. May 22, 2011 – December 1, 2023, born in Glasgow, Scotland.
- Jonathan "Jonny" Gibson, PhD. Stated Supply Senior Minister. October 6, 2024 - present, born in Northern Ireland, con-currently serving as associate professor of Old Testament at Westminster Theological Seminary. Elected to become full time senior minister starting June 1, 2026.

=== Notable members ===
Some notable members have included:

- C. Everett Koop, MD Surgeon General of the United States served during the presidency of Ronald Reagan and provided guidance during the onset of the global HIV/AIDS pandemic. He first gained national attention as the head of pediatrics at the University of Pennsylvania and Children's Hospital of Philadelphia. A plaque in the sanctuary notes his membership and service to the country.
- Robert Elmore, who served as music director from 1969 until his death in 1985.

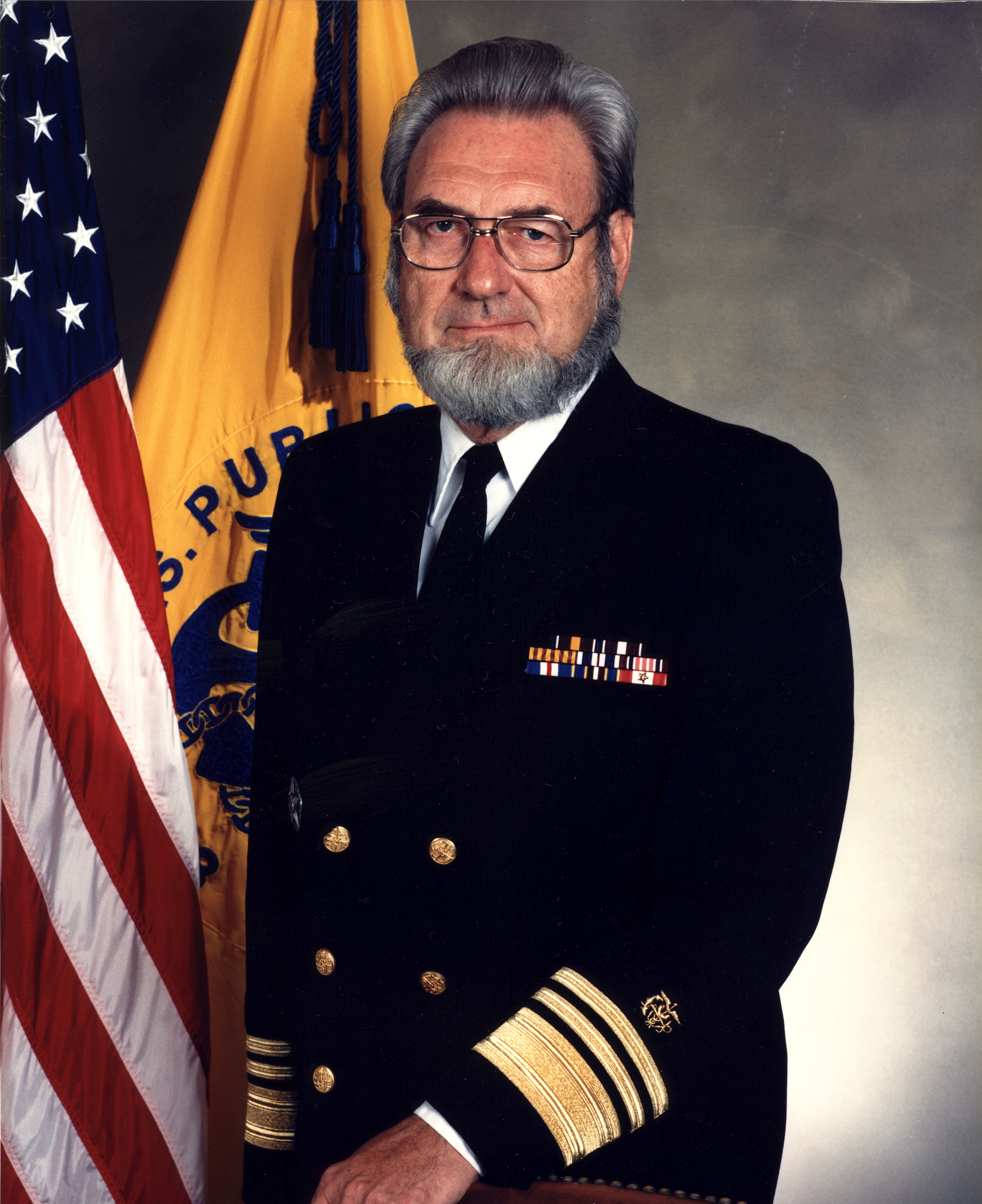
C. Everett Koop, MD

- John McArthur Jr. (1823–1890) was a prominent American architect who designed Philadelphia City Hall and Tenth Presbyterian Church, among other buildings in Philadelphia.

== Ministries ==
- Four Sunday services with approximately 550 people in weekly attendance
- ACTS Ministries: mercy ministries to the poor and homeless near Tenth Church
- Tenth College Fellowship (TCF) is a group for college students.
- Tenth City Network (TCN) is a group for young adults.
- Maranatha is the youth group for students in grades 7–12, begun in 1984 and still continuing to meet weekly on Sunday nights and sponsor other events throughout the year.
- Small group Bible studies meet weekly in host homes across the city of Philadelphia and throughout the suburbs in Pennsylvania and New Jersey
- Various other discipleship groups, support groups, and prayer groups meet regularly in the church facilities and elsewhere

== Gallery ==
Tenth Presbyterian Church Architecture

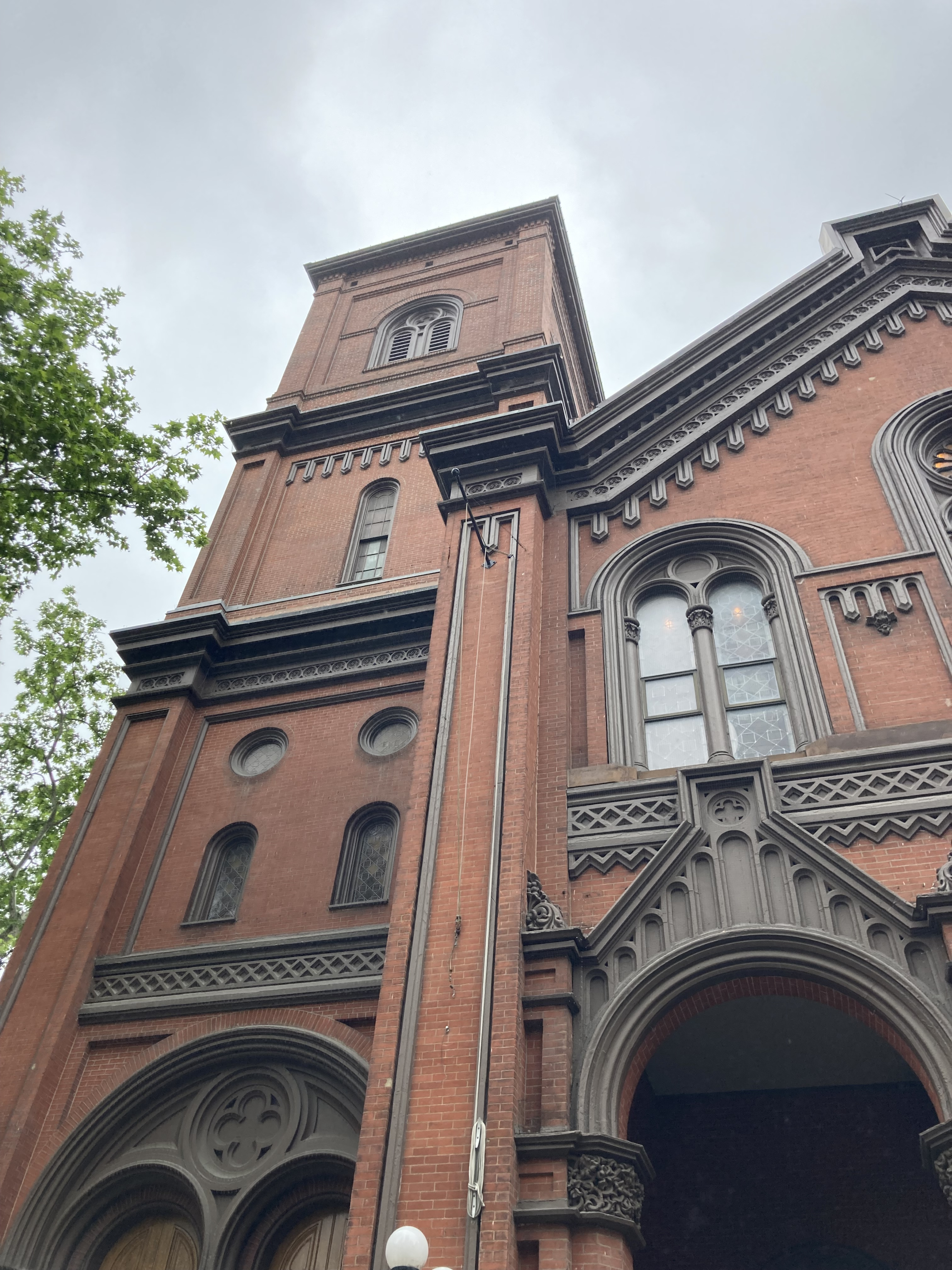
Steeple of church and north side exterior

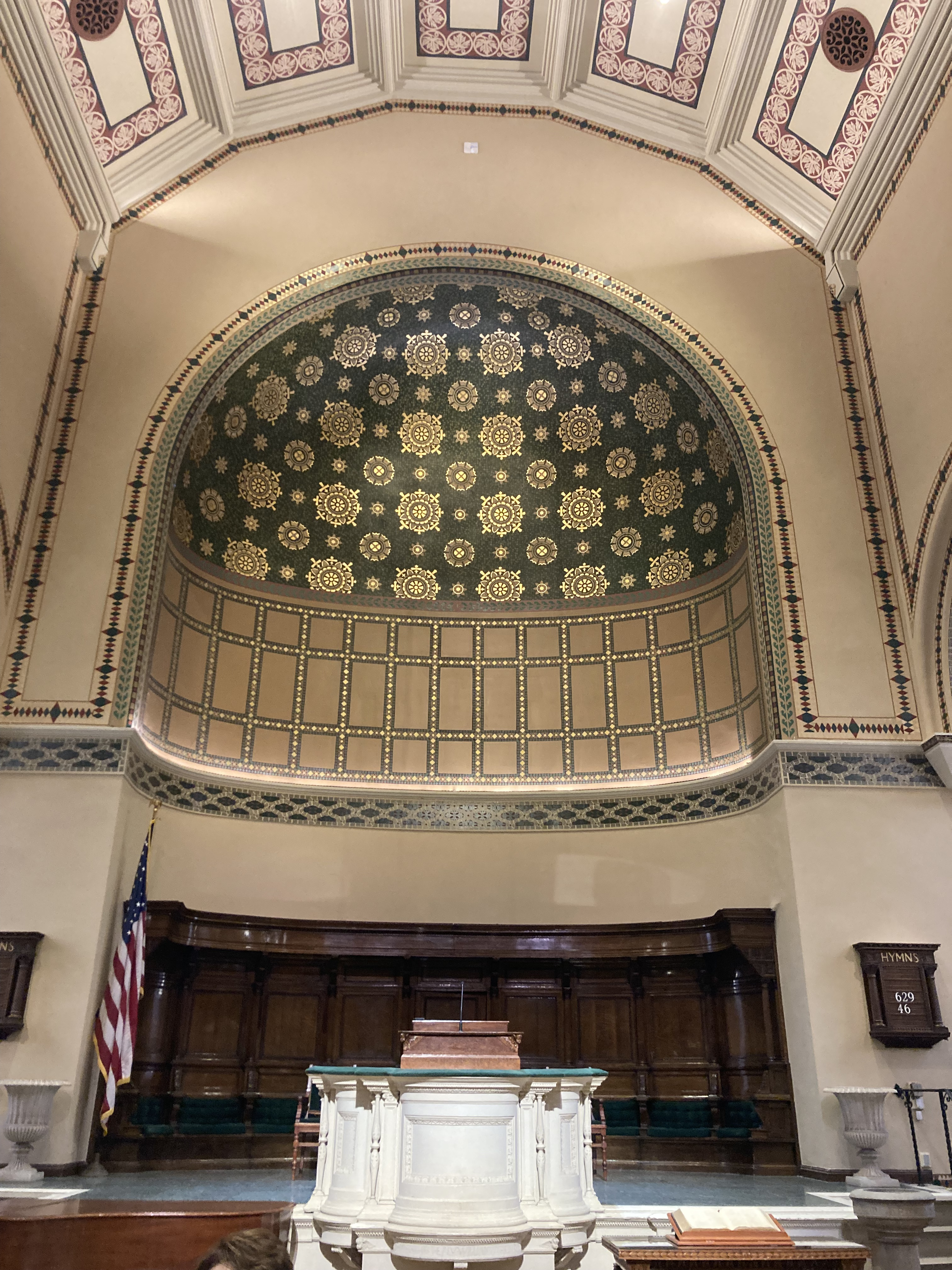
Pulpit, platform by architect Frank Miles Day in Neo-Byzantine style

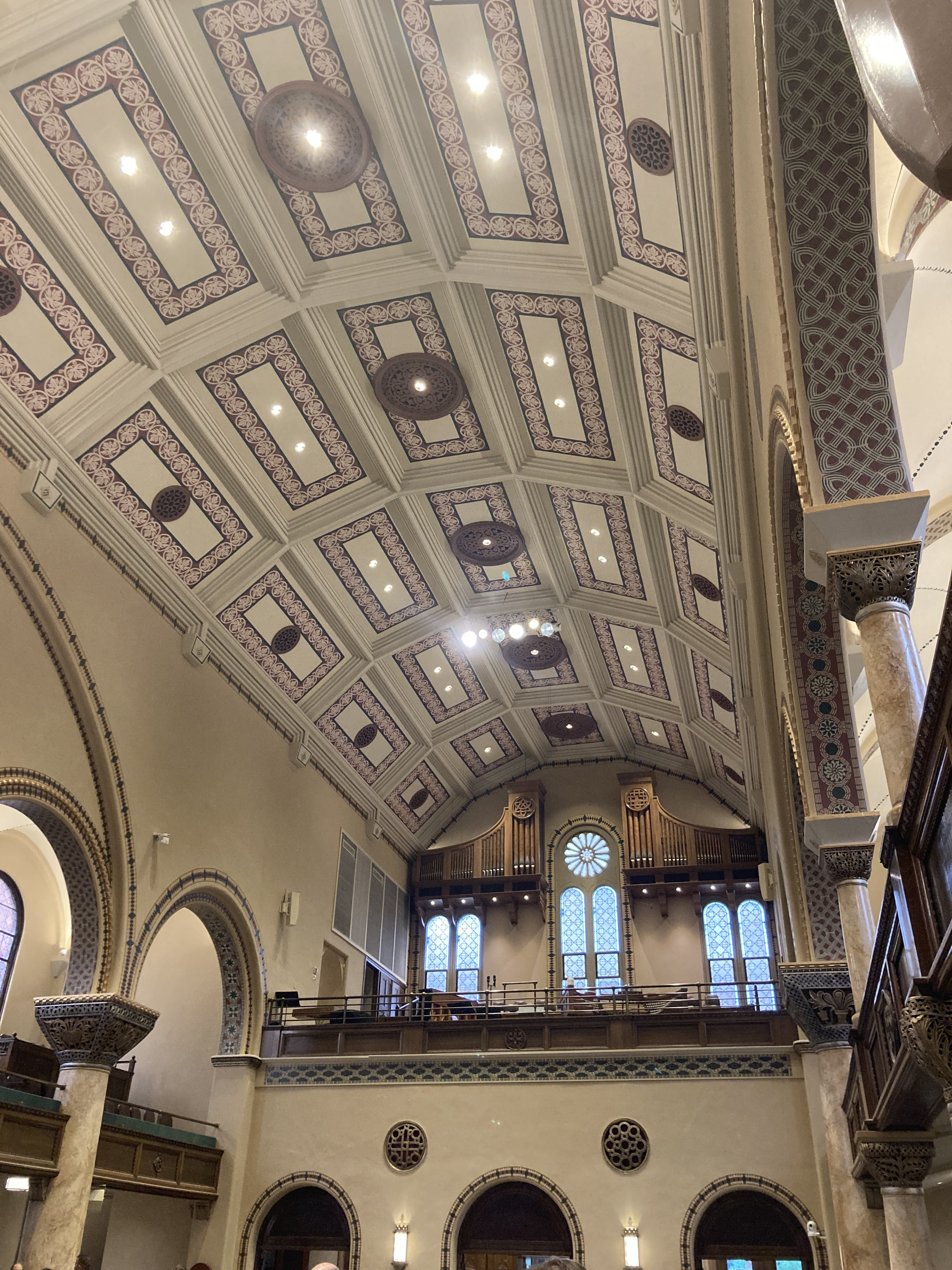
Apse and rear of sanctuary in Neo-Byzantine style with organ in the back

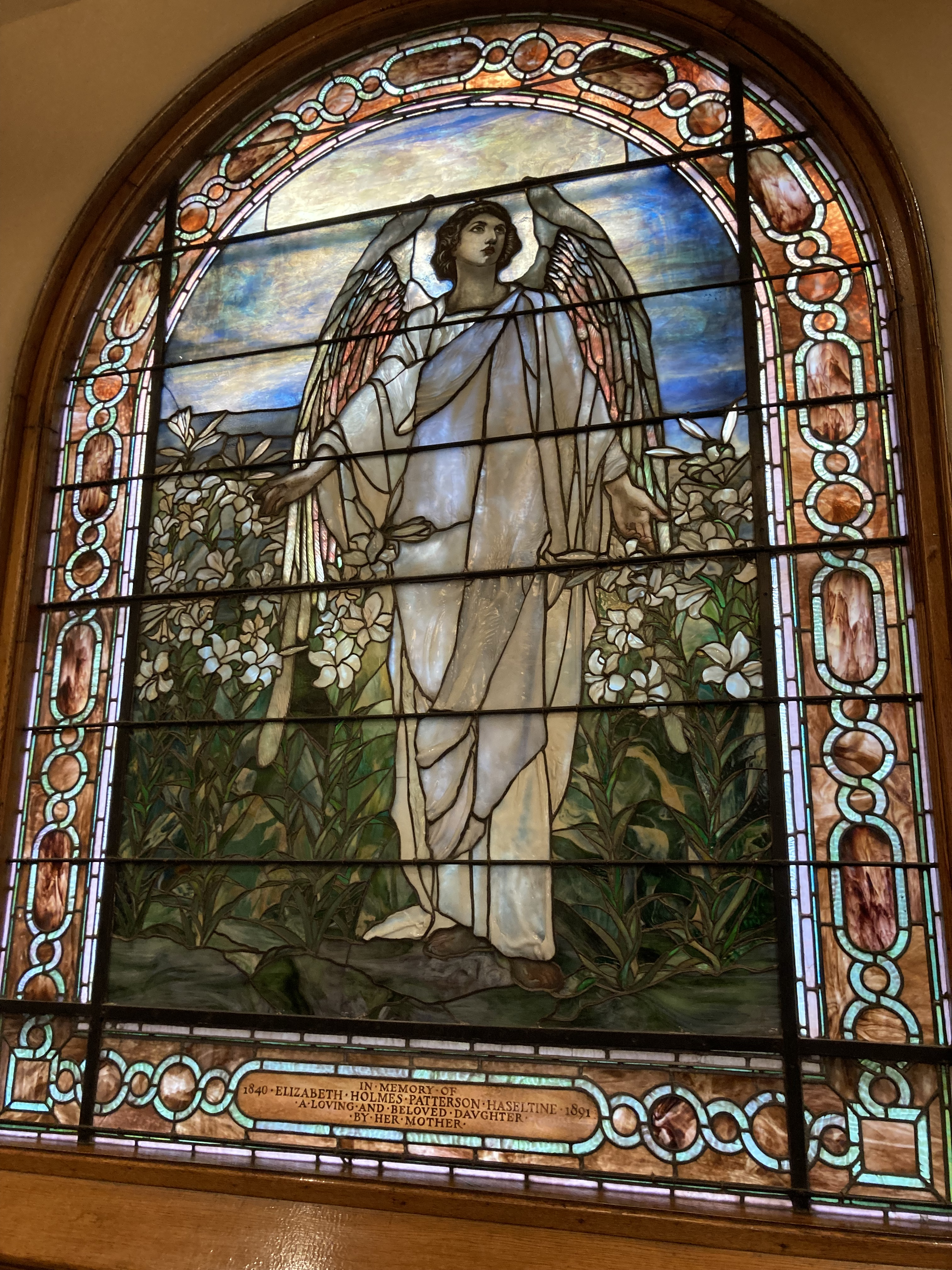
Stained glass window of angel on east side of sanctuary with folded glass

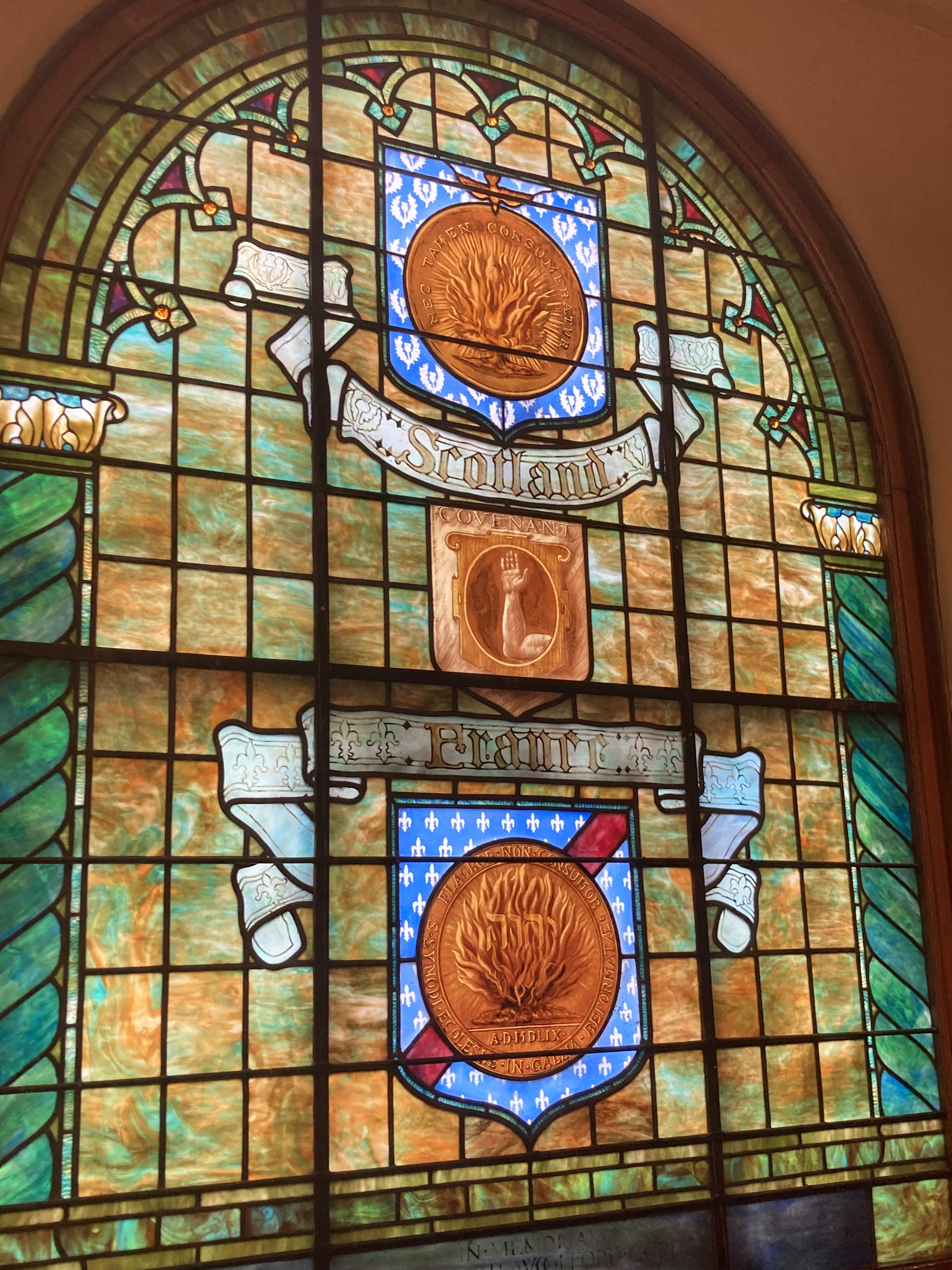
Scottish Presbyterian, French Huguenot stain glassed window

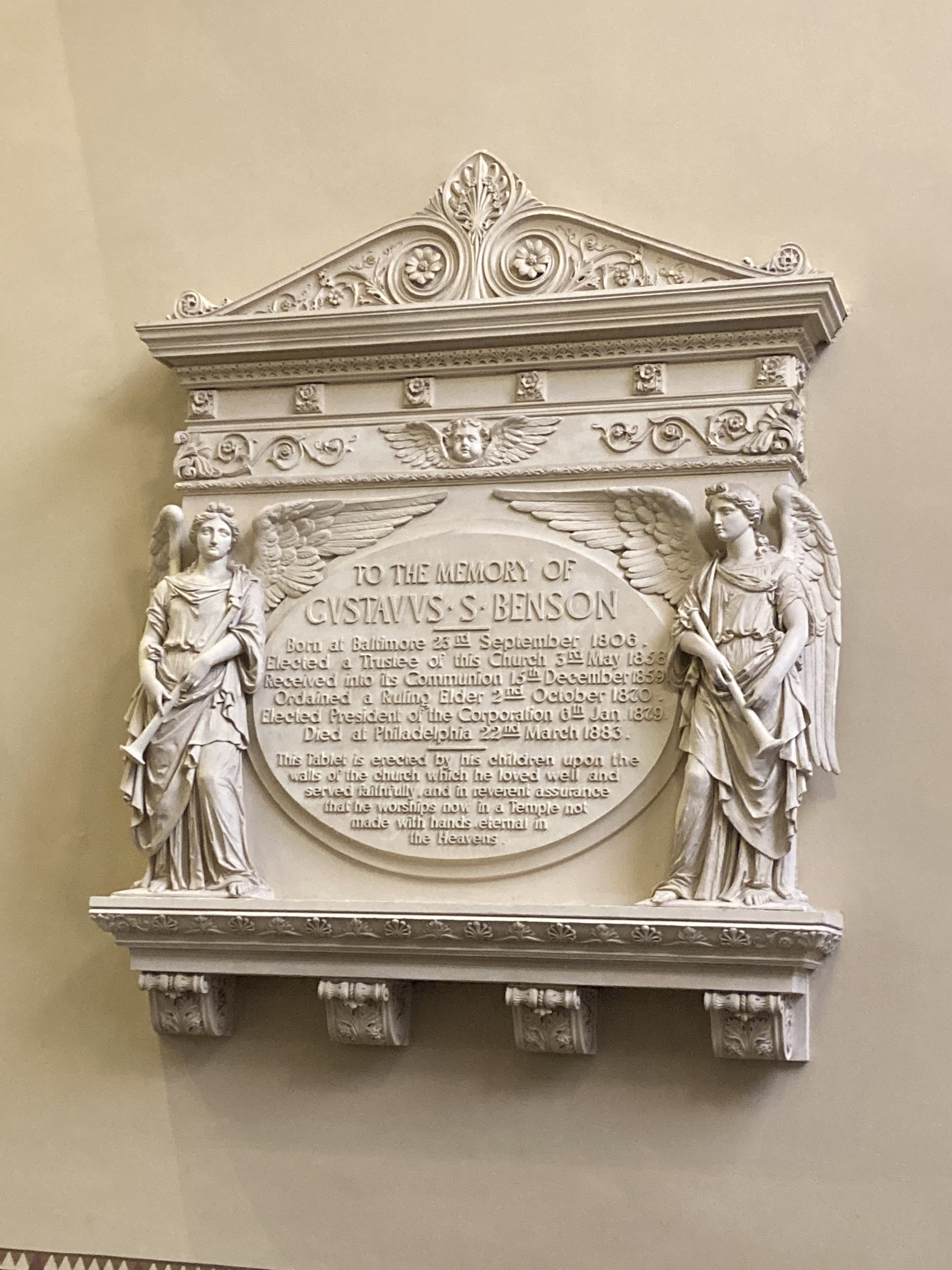
Memorial plaque in sanctuary

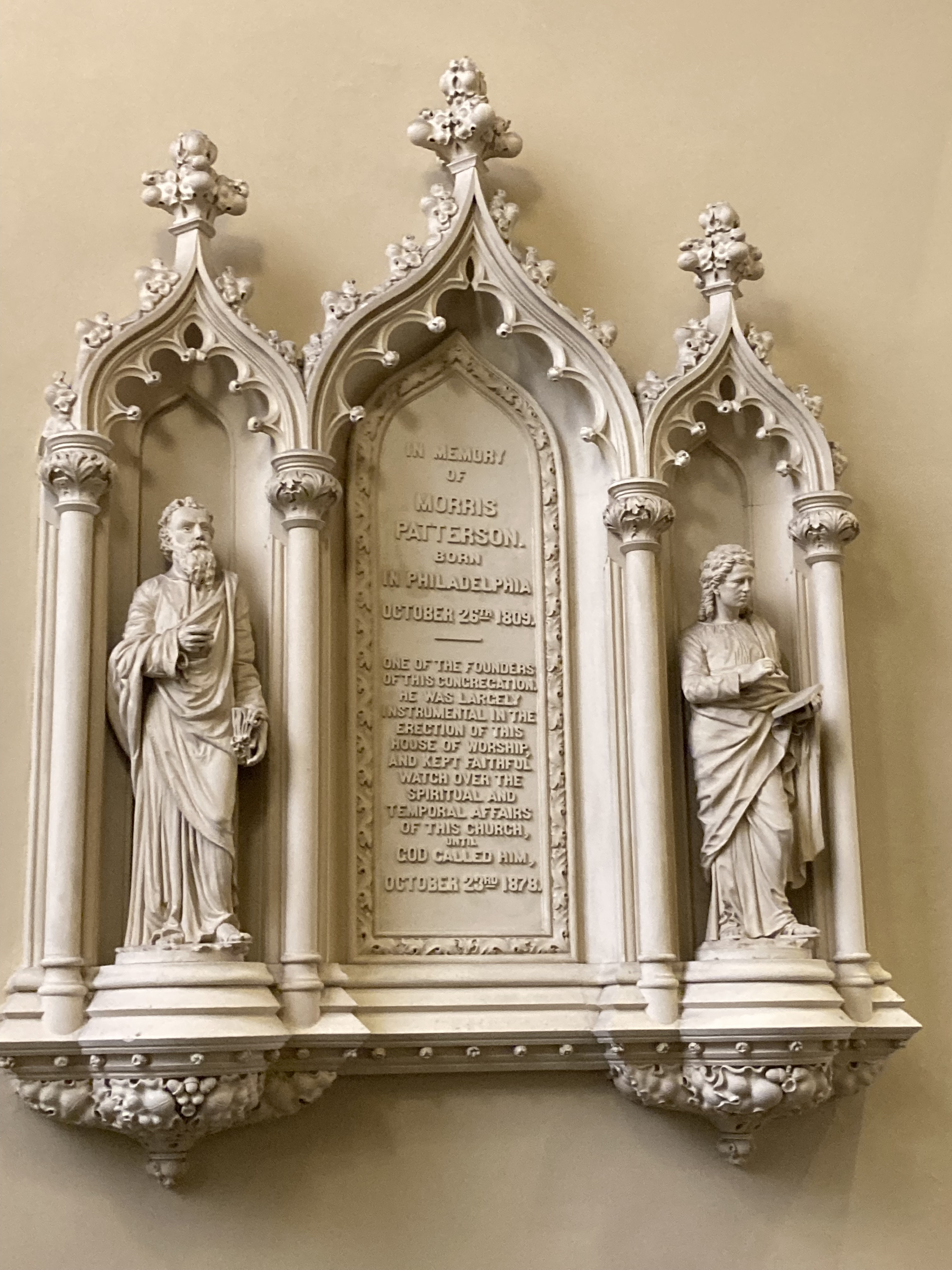
Memorial plaque in sanctuary by Theophilus P. Chandler Jr.

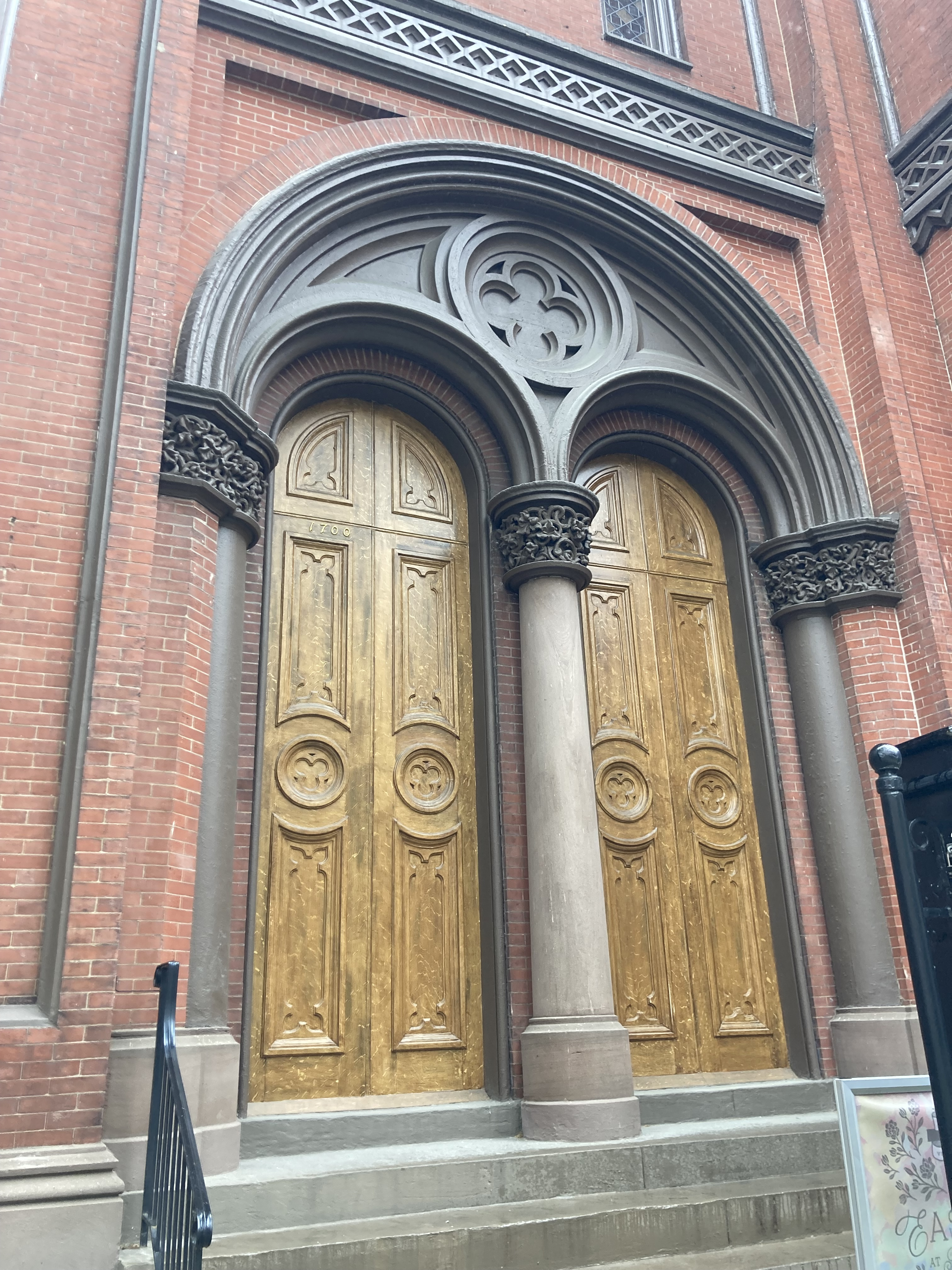
Arched Lombard Romanesque doors with pilasters and Church's logo on top

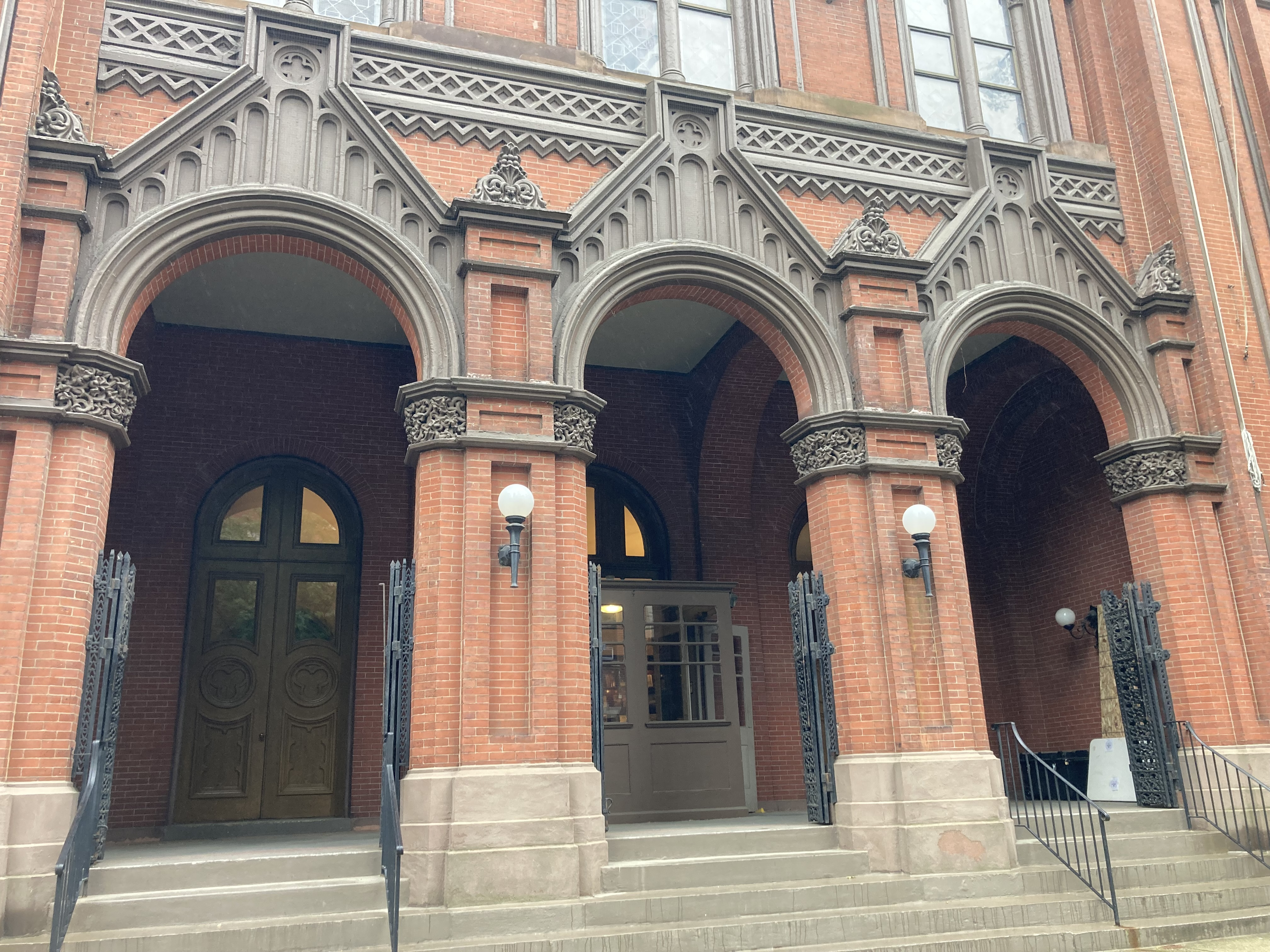
Main entrance on north side of church in Lombard Romanesque style

Records
Preceded by Park Street Church	Tallest towers in the United States outside of New York City; 1856–1863; 76 m	Succeeded by United States Capitol
Preceded by Christ Church	Tallest building in Pennsylvania; 76 metres (249 ft); 1856-1894	Succeeded by Philadelphia City Hall
Preceded by Christ Church	Tallest building in Philadelphia; 76 metres (249 ft); 1856-1894	Succeeded by Philadelphia City Hall
