= Zephaniah =

Biblical figure

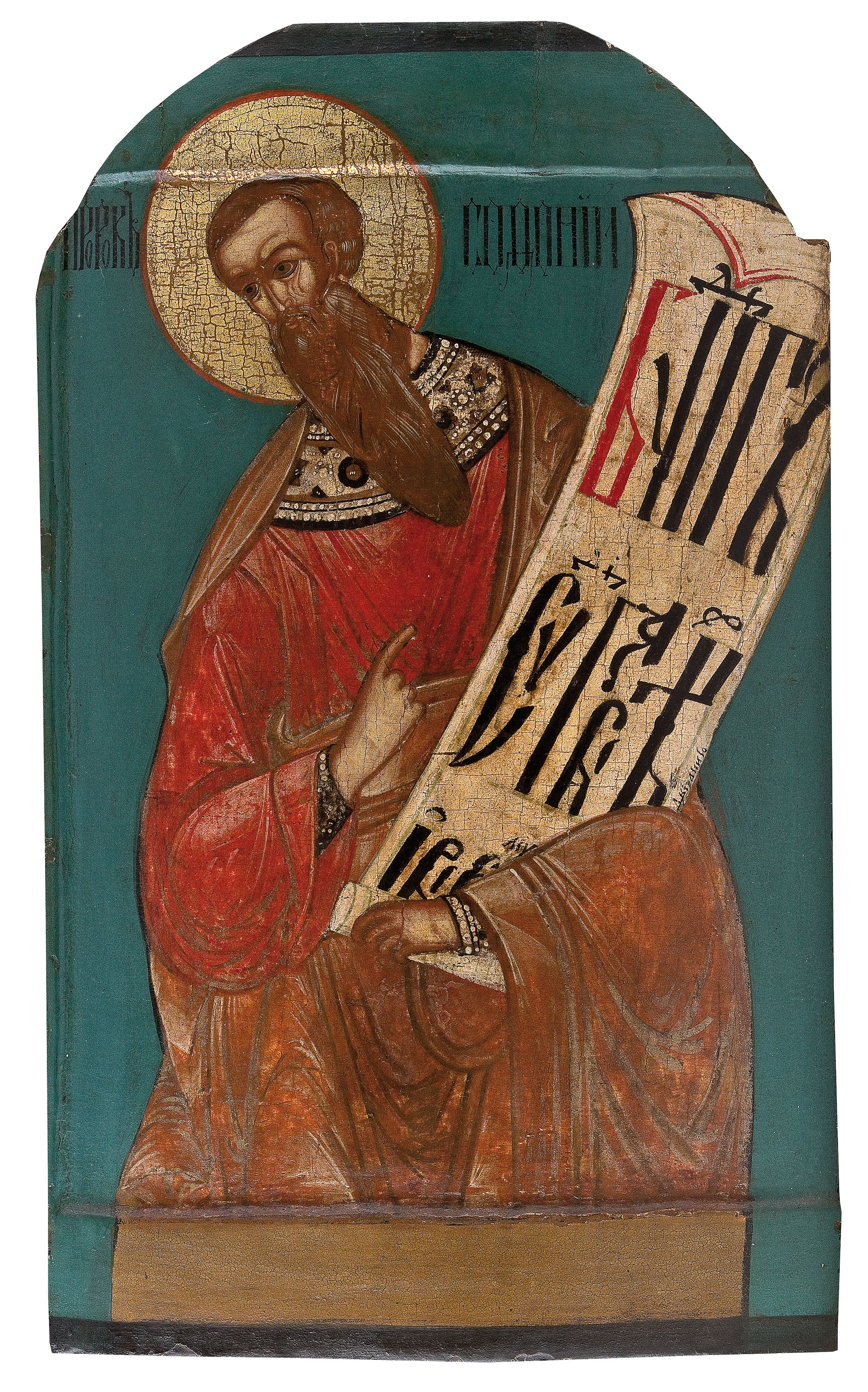
A 17th century icon of Zephaniah

Zephaniah (/zɛfəˈnaɪ.ə/, Hebrew: צְפַנְיָה, Modern: Ṣəfanya, Tiberian: Ṣep̄anyā, "Concealed of/is YHWH"; Greek: Σοφονίας – Sōfənīəs) is the name of several people in the Hebrew Bible; the most prominent being the prophet who prophesied in the days of Josiah, king of Judah (640–609 BCE) and is attributed a book bearing his name among the Twelve Minor Prophets. His name is commonly transliterated Sophonias in Bibles translated from the Vulgate or Septuagint. The name might mean "Yahweh has hidden/protected," or "Yah lies in wait". The church father Jerome interpreted the name to mean "the watchman of the Lord".

== The prophet Zephaniah ==
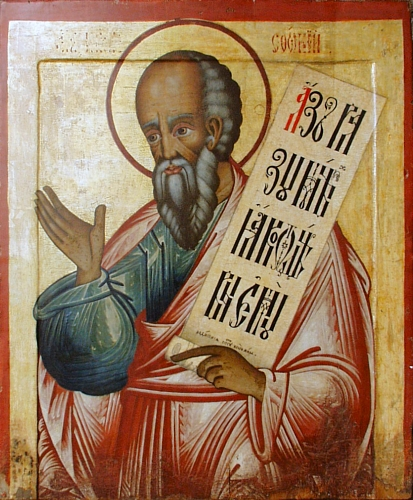
An 18th-century Russian icon of the prophet Zephaniah in Kizhi, Karelia

The best known Biblical figure bearing the name Zephaniah is the son of Cushi, and great-great grandson of King Hezekiah, ninth in the literary order of the Twelve Minor Prophets. He prophesied in the days of Josiah, ruler of the Kingdom of Judah (640–609 BCE), but before Josiah's reform in 621 BCE, and was contemporary with Jeremiah, with whom he had much in common. The unique source containing the minimal knowledge of his personality and rhetorical and literary qualities is the short, three chapter book of the Old Testament which bears his name. The scene of his activity was the city of Jerusalem, which he seems to know well. The existence of two Zephaniahs linked to the book is considered purely hypothetical.

=== Date of activity ===
Under the two preceding kings of Judah, Amon of Judah and Manasseh of Judah, the cult of other deities, especially Baal and Astarte, had developed in Jerusalem, bringing with it elements of alien culture and morals. Josiah, a dedicated reformer, wished to put an end to perceived misuse of the holy places. One of the most zealous champions and advisers of this reform was Zephaniah, and his writing remains one of the most important documents for the understanding of the era of Josiah.

Boldly predicting the destruction of Judah for the evil committed by its occupants, the prophet spoke against the religious and moral corruption, when, in view of the idolatry which had penetrated even into the sanctuary, he warned that God would "destroy out of this place the remnant of Baal, and the names of the idolatrous priests" (Zeph 1:4), and pleaded for a return to the simplicity of their fathers instead of the luxurious foreign clothing which was worn especially in aristocratic circles (1:8).

The age of Zephaniah was also a key historical period, because the lands of Western Asia were overrun by foreigners due to the migration of the Scythians in the last decades of the seventh century BC, and because Jerusalem was only a few decades before its downfall in 586 BC. In light of these events, a message of impending judgment is the primary burden of this figure's preaching (1:7).

=== The Book of Zephaniah ===
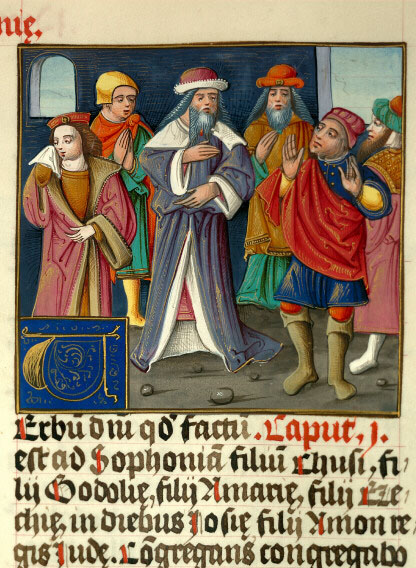
Zephaniah addressing people (France, 16th century).

The Book of Zephaniah contains the fundamental ideas of the preaching of Zephaniah. The scheme of the book in its present form is as follows:

1. Zephaniah 1:2–2:3. Warnings about the "day of the Lord", a Dies irae, dies illa of the Old Testament. The judgment of the Lord will descend on Judah and Jerusalem as a punishment for the awful degeneracy in religious life (1:4–7a); it will extend to all classes of the people (1:7b–13), and will be attended with all the horrors of a frightful catastrophe (1:14–18); therefore, repent and seek the Lord (2:1–3).
2. Zephaniah 2:4–15. Not only Jerusalem, but the entire world is subject to judgment, including the Philistines, (4–7) Moabites, Ammonites, (8–11) Ethiopians, (12) Assyrians and Ninevites (13-15).
3. Zephaniah 3:1–8. The Prophet focuses once again on Jerusalem: "Woe to the provoking, and redeemed city ... She hath not hearkened to the voice, neither hath she received discipline." The severest reckoning will be required of the leading classes of the civil community, and of the Prophets and priests as the directors of public worship.
4. Zephaniah 3:9–20. With a prophetic glance at the Kingdom of God of the future, in which all the world unites and turns to God, the prosperity of the Messianic Kingdom will be enjoyed.
5. Zephaniah 3:9–20. The last message of Zephaniah also has a Messianic coloring, although not to an extent comparable with that which may be found in the Book of Isaiah.

=== In Christianity ===
He is commemorated with the other minor prophets in the calendar of saints of the Armenian Apostolic Church on July 31. On the Eastern Orthodox liturgical calendar and in the Roman Martyrology, he is commemorated on December 3.

His book is an inspiration for the hymn, Dies irae.

== In Islam ==
In Islam, Safanyah (Arabic: صفني) is recognized by some scholars as a prophet sent to Bani-Israel, though he is not mentioned in the Quran and there are no authentic Hadiths about him. His story is known mainly through Israʼiliyyat and historical works like Ibn Kathir's Al-Bidaya wa l-Nihaya. Details about his life, family, and mission remain largely unknown in Islamic sources.

== Other Zephaniahs in the Bible ==
Other individuals named Zephaniah include:

1. The son of Maaseiah, the "second priest" in the reign of Zedekiah, often mentioned in Jeremiah as having been sent from the king to inquire (Jer. 21:1) regarding the coming woes which he had denounced, and to entreat the prophet's intercession that the judgment threatened might be averted (Jer 29:25, 26, 29; 37:3; 52:24). He, along with some other captive Jews, was put to death by Nebuchadnezzar II "at Riblah in the land of Hamath" (2 Kings 25:21).
2. A Kohathite ancestor of the prophet Samuel (1 Chr 6:36).
3. The father of Josiah, the kohen (priest) who dwelt in Jerusalem when Darius I issued the decree that the temple should be rebuilt ... (Zech 6:10).

== See also ==
- Apocalypse of Zephaniah (pseudepigraphic book)

== Sources ==
- Carson, D. A.; Hess, Richard S.; Alexander, T. D.; Moo, Douglas J.; Naselli, Andrew David, eds. (2015). NIV Zondervan Study Bible. Grand Rapids: Zondervan. ISBN 978-0-31043833-5.
- Grudem, Wayne; Dennis, Lane T.; Packer, J. I.; Collins, C. John; Schreiner, Thomas R.; Taylor, Justin, eds. (2008). ESV Study Bible. Wheaton: Crossway. ISBN 978-1-43350241-5.
