= C. John Collins =

American biblical scholar (1954-)

- Collins at the 2013 meeting of the North-East ETS
- Born: Clifford John Collins; 1954 (age 71–72)

Academic background
- Education: Massachusetts Institute of Technology (BS, MS); Faith Evangelical Lutheran Seminary (MDiv); University of Liverpool (PhD)
- Thesis: Homonymous Verbs in Biblical Hebrew (1988)

Academic work
- Discipline: Biblical studies
- Institutions: Covenant Theological Seminary

Clifford John "Jack" Collins (born 1954) is an engineer and professor of Old Testament at Covenant Theological Seminary, where he has served since 1993.

== Life and career ==
Collins graduated from the Massachusetts Institute of Technology (MIT) with a Bachelor of Science (B.S.) and a Master of Science (M.S.) in computer science and systems engineering. He then earned a Master of Divinity (M.Div.) from Faith Evangelical Lutheran Seminary and a Ph.D. in Biblical Hebrew linguistics from the School of Archaeology and Oriental Studies at the University of Liverpool.

Collins was Old Testament Chairman for the ESV Study Bible, served as ESV Text Editor for The English-Greek Reverse Interlinear New Testament (Crossway, 2006), and is Old Testament Editor of the English Standard Version Study Bible.

He has published numerous articles in technical journals, as well as The New International Dictionary of Old Testament Theology and Exegesis. In 2000 his book on the theological and exegetical aspects of divine action, entitled The God of Miracles, was published by Crossway. It was also carried by InterVarsity Press in the UK the following year. His next book, Science and Faith: Friends or Foes? was also published by Crossway in 2003, followed by Genesis 1-4: A Linguistic, Theological, and Literary Commentary, published by P&R (2006).

Collins' recent book Did Adam and Eve Really Exist?: Who They Were and Why You Should Care (Crossway, 2011), in which he highlights the importance to Christian theology of believing that the biblical period fall of man was a historical event. The book explores four biblically defensible views, and how each comports or contrasts with modern theories of human evolution. Collins has been a prominent voice in recent discussion among evangelicals on this topic.

== Works ==
=== Thesis ===
- ——— (1988). Homonymous Verbs in Biblical Hebrew: an investigation of the role of comparative philology (Ph.D.). Liverpool, UK: University of Liverpool. OCLC 51673195.

=== Books ===
- ——— (2000). The God of Miracles: an exegetical examination of God's action in the world. Wheaton IL: Crossway. ISBN 9781581341416. OCLC 42690160.
- ——— (2003). Science and Faith: Friends or Foes?. Wheaton IL: Crossway. ISBN 9781581344301. OCLC 51810933.
- ———; Grudem, Wayne A.; Poythress, Vern S.; Ryken, Leland; Winter, Bruce (2005). Translating Truth: the case for essentially literal Bible translation. Wheaton IL: Crossway. ISBN 9781581347555. OCLC 61512977.
- ——— (2006). Genesis 1-4: A Linguistic, Theological, and Literary Commentary. Phillipsburg, NJ: P&R Publishing. ISBN 9780875526195. OCLC 60491947.
- ——— (2011). Did Adam and Eve Really Exist?: Who They Were and Why You Should Care. Wheaton IL & Leicester, UK: Crossway & InterVarsity Press. ISBN 9781844745258. OCLC 800833074.
- ——— (2018). Reading Genesis Well: Navigating History, Poetry, Science, and Truth in Genesis 1-11. Grand Rapids, MI: Zondervan. ISBN 9780310598572.

=== Edited by ===
- ———; Grudem, Wayne A.; Schreiner, Thomas R., eds. (2012). Understanding Scripture: an overview of the Bible's origin, reliability, and meaning. Wheaton IL: Crossway. ISBN 9781433529993. OCLC 746833655.
