= Reformed systematic theology bibliography =

Reformed systematic theology bibliography consists of complete works of systematic theology in the Reformed tradition. Systematic theology is the orderly formulation of Christian doctrines and beliefs. This bibliography includes works which attempt to present a coherent account of all major doctrines of the Reformed faith. Theologians considered by scholars to be in the Reformed tradition are included, even if they are considered to have departed from any particular conception of the Reformed faith.

Dogmatics is sometimes used as a synonym for "systematic theology." Dogmatic theology properly covers beliefs which are normative within a church, while systematics may cover beliefs of individual theologians which are not considered to be firmly established.

== Works of Reformed systematic theology ==
- Calvin, John (1559) [1536]. Institutio christianae religionis (in Latin). Geneva.
  - English translation available online: Institutes of the Christian Religion. Translated by William Beveridge. Grand Rapids, MI: Wm. B. Eerdmans. 1989.
  - Contemporary English translation: Institutes of the Christian Religion. Vol. 2 volumes. Translated by Ford Lewis Battles. Philadelphia: Westminster Press. 1960.
- Bullinger, Heinrich (1549–1551). Sermonum Decades quinqae [Five Decades of Sermons] (in Latin). Zurich.
  - English translation: Harding, Thomas, ed. (1849–1852). The Decades of Heinrich Bullinger. Cambridge: Cambridge University Press. Volumes 1 & 2, 3, 4, 5
- Musculus, Wolfgang (1560). Loci communes sacrae theologiae (in Latin). Basel.
  - English translation: —————— (1563). Common Places of Christian Religion. London.
- Zanchi, Girolamo (1586). De religion Christiana fides (in Latin). Basel.
  - English translation: Baschera, Luca; Moser, Christian, eds. (2007). De religion Christiana fides – Confession of Christian Religion. Vol. 2 volumes. Leiden: Brill.
- Ursinus, Zacharias (1591). Corpus doctrinae Christianae (in Latin). Neustadt.
  - English translation: The Commentary of Dr. Zacharias Ursinus on The Heidelberg Catechism (PDF). Translated by George W. Williard. The Synod of the Reformed Church in the U.S. 2004 [1852].
- Bucanus, Gulielmus (1602). Institutiones theologicae [Institutions of Christian Religion] (in Latin). Geneva.
  - English translation by Robert Hill (clergyman), London, 1606
- Ames, William (1623). Mudulla theologiae (in Latin). Franeker.
  - English translation: The marrow of sacred divinity. London: Edward Griffin. 1639.
  - Contemporary English translation: The Marrow of Theology. Translated by John Dykstra Eusden. Grand Rapids, MI: Baker Academic. 1997.
- Wolleb, Johannes (1626). Compendium theologiae Christianae (in Latin).
  - English translation: Abridgement of Christian Divinity. Translated by Alexander Ross. London. 1650.
- Crocius, Ludwig (1636). Syntagma sacrae theologiae (in Latin). Vol. 4 volumes. Bremen.
- Turretin, Francis (1679–1685). Institutio theologiae elencticae (in Latin). Vol. 3 volumes. Geneva.
  - English translation: Dennison, James T. Jr., ed. (1992). Institutes of Elenctic Theology. Vol. 3 volumes. Translated by George Musgrave Giger. P & R Publishing.
- à Brakel, Wilhelmus (1700). Logikē latreia (in Dutch). The Hague.
  - English translation: Beeke, Joel R., ed. (1992). The Christian's Reasonable Service. Vol. 4 volumes. Translated by Bartel Elshout. Grand Rapids, MI: Reformation Heritage Books. Archived from the original on July 12, 2010.
- Schleiermacher, Friedrich (1830–1831). Der Christliche Glaube (in German). Vol. 2 volumes. Berlin: Reimer.
  - English translation: The Christian Faith. Translated by H. R. MacKintosh. Edinburgh: T & T Clark. 1999.
  - New Translation and Critical Edition: Tice, Terrence N.; Kelsey, Catherine L., eds. (2016). Christian Faith: A New Translation and Critical Edition. Vol. 2 volumes. Translated by Terrence N. Tice, Catherine L. Kelsey. Louisville, KY: Westminster Press.
- Heppe, Heinrich (1861). Reformierte Dogmatik (in German). Elberfield: Frederichs.
  - English translation: Bizer, Ernst, ed. (2008). Reformed Dogmatics. Translated by G. T. Thomson. Wipf & Stock.
- Hodge, Charles (1872–1873). Systematic Theology. Vol. 3 volumes. London: Nelson. Volume 1, 2, 3
- Bavinck, Herman (1895–1901). Gereformeerde Dogmatiek (in Dutch). Vol. 4 volumes. Kampen: J.H. Bos.
  - English translation: Bolt, John, ed. (2008). Reformed Dogmatics. Vol. 4 volumes. Translated by John Vriend. Grand Rapids, MI: Baker Book House.
- Vos, Geerhardus (1896). Gereformeerde Dogmatiek (in Dutch). Vol. 5 volumes. Grand Rapids, MI.
  - English translation: Gaffin, Richard B., ed. (2012–2016). Reformed Dogmatics. Vol. 5 volumes. Translated by Richard B. Gaffin Jr. Bellingham, WA: Lexham.
- Berkhof, Louis (1932). Systematic Theology. Grand Rapids, MI: William B. Eeerdmans.
- Brunner, Emil (1946–1960). Dogmatik (in German). Vol. 3 volumes. Zürich: Zwingli-Verlag.
  - English translation: Dogmatics. Vol. 3 volumes. Translated by Olive Wyon. Philadelphia: Westminster Press. 1950. Volume 1, 2
- Weber, Otto (1955–1962). Grundlagen der Dogmatik (in German). Neukirchen: Verlag der Buchhandlung des Erziehungsverein.
  - English translation: Foundations in Dogmatics. Vol. 2 volumes. Grand Rapids, MI: Eerdmans. 1981.
- Hoeksema, Herman (1966). Reformed Dogmatics. Grand Rapids, MI: Reformed Free Publishing Association.
- Barth, Karl (1932–1967). Kirchliche Dogmatik (in German). Vol. 13 volumes. Zürich: EVZ-Verlag.
  - English translation: Church Dogmatics. Vol. 14 volumes. Translated by Geoffrey William Bromiley and Thomas Forsyth Torrance. Peabody, MA: Hendrickson. 2010.
- Berkouwer, Gerrit Cornelis (1949–1972). Dogmatisch studiёn (in Dutch). Vol. 18 volumes. Kampen: Kok.
  - English translation: Studies in Dogmatics. Vol. 14 volumes. Translated by. Grand Rapids, MI: Eerdmans. 1981.
- Berkhof, Hendrikus (1973). Christelijk geloof (in Dutch). Nijkerk: Callenbach.
  - English translation: Christian Faith. Translated by Sierd Woudstra. Grand Rapids, MI: Wm. B. Eerdmans. 2002.
- Genderen, J. van [in Dutch]; Velema, W. H. [in Dutch] (1992). Beknopte gereformeerde dogmatiek (in Dutch). Kampden: J.H. Kok.
  - English translation: Concise Reformed Dogmatics. Phillipsburg, NJ: P&R Publishing. 2008.
- Grudem, Wayne (1994). Systematic Theology: An Introduction to Biblical Doctrine (1st ed.). Grand Rapids, MI: Zondervan. ISBN 0310286700.
  - Grudem, Wayne (2020). Systematic Theology: An Introduction to Biblical Doctrine (2nd ed.). Grand Rapids, MI: Zondervan. ISBN 9780310517979.
- Migliore, Daniel L. (2004). Faith Seeking Understanding. Grand Rapids, MI: Wm. B. Eerdmans.
- Horton, Michael (2011). The Christian Faith: A Systematic Theology for Pilgrims on the Way. Grand Rapids, MI: Zondervan.
- Frame, John (2013). Systematic Theology: An Introduction to Christian Belief. Phillipsburg, NJ: P&R Publishing.
