= English Standard Version =

English translation of the Bible

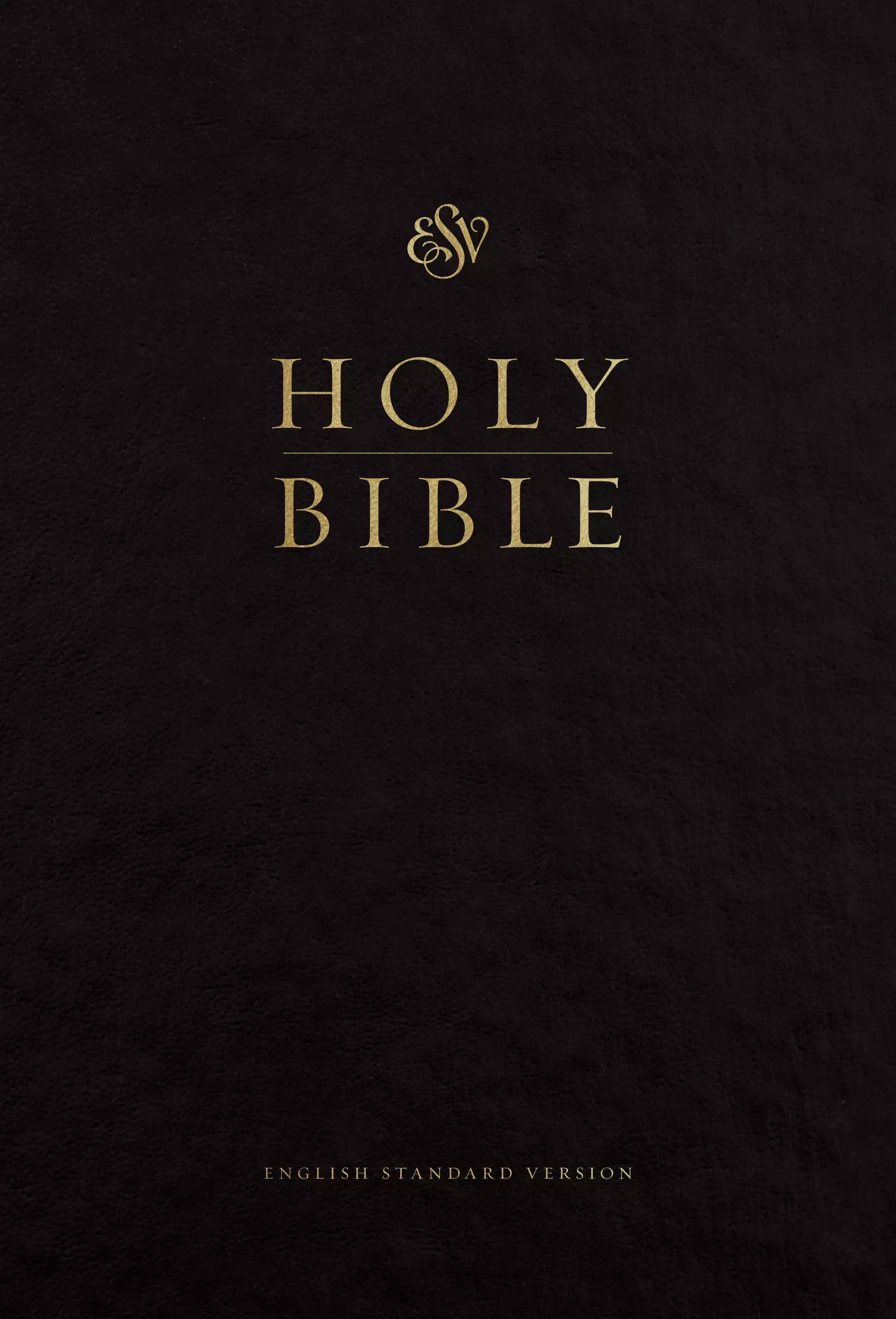
- ESV Pew Bible (hardcover, black)
- Abbreviation: ESV
- Complete Bible published: 2001
- Derived from: Revised Standard Version (2nd ed., 1971)
- Textual basis: OT: Biblia Hebraica Stuttgartensia (5th ed., 1997); additional sources in difficult cases; NT: UBS Greek New Testament (5th corrected ed.); Novum Testamentum Graece (28th ed., 2012); Apocrypha: (Note: The Apocrypha is not included in editions of the ESV published by Crossway. ESV editions licensed by Crossway that feature a translation of the Apocrypha can be found from various publishers. For example, the English Standard Version Bible with Apocrypha, published by Oxford University Press in 2009, and the ESV with Apocrypha, published by Anglican Liturgy Press in 2019 (which features Apocrypha text revisions made by Crossway in 2017). The copyright for the ESV Apocrypha text is owned by Crossway.) Septuagint (Göttingen; Rahlfs'); Latin Vulgate
- Translation type: Formal equivalence
- Reading level: Eighth grade
- Version revision: 2007, 2011, 2016, 2025 (Note: Crossway published an unannounced revision in 2002 to make several text corrections.)
- Publisher: Crossway
- Copyright: The Holy Bible, English Standard Version® (ESV®) © 2001 by Crossway, a publishing ministry of Good News Publishers. All rights reserved.
- Copies printed: 370,000,000
- Religious affiliation: Evangelical
- Website: www.esv.org
- Genesis 1:1–3 In the beginning, God created the heavens and the earth. The earth was without form and void, and darkness was over the face of the deep. And the Spirit of God was hovering over the face of the waters. And God said, "Let there be light," and there was light. John 3:16 "For God so loved the world, that he gave his only Son, that whoever believes in him should not perish but have eternal life.

The English Standard Version (ESV) is a translation of the Bible in contemporary English. Published in 2001 by Crossway, the ESV was "created by a team of more than 100 leading evangelical scholars and pastors." The ESV relies on recently published critical editions of the original Hebrew, Aramaic, and Greek texts.

Crossway says that the ESV continues a legacy of precision and faithfulness in translating the original text into English. (Note: This lineage follows the "classic mainstream" started by William Tyndale's New Testament, having been continued by "the King James Version of 1611 (KJV), the English Revised Version of 1885 (RV), the American Standard Version of 1901 (ASV), and the Revised Standard Version of 1952 and 1971 (RSV).") It describes the ESV as a translation that adheres to an "essentially literal" translation philosophy, taking into account "differences in grammar, syntax, and idiom between current literary English and the original languages." It also describes the ESV as a translation that "emphasizes 'word-for-word' accuracy, literary excellence, and depth of meaning."

Since its official publication, the ESV has received endorsement from numerous evangelical pastors and theologians, including John Piper and R. C. Sproul.

== History ==
=== Pre-publication ===
During the early 1990s, Crossway president Lane T. Dennis engaged in discussions with various Christian scholars and pastors regarding the need for a new literal translation of the Bible. In 1997, Dennis contacted the National Council of Churches (NCC) and proceeded to enter negotiations, alongside Trinity Evangelical Divinity School professor Wayne Grudem, to obtain rights to use the 1971 text edition of the Revised Standard Version (RSV) as the starting point for a new translation. In September 1998, an agreement was reached with the NCC for Crossway to use and modify the 1971 RSV text, thereby enabling the creation of a new translation. Crossway moved forward from this position by forming a translation committee and initiating work on the English Standard Version. Having announced the ESV as a new translation in February 1999, Crossway officially published the ESV in September 2001. The first ESV print edition to be released was the ESV Classic Reference Bible. It was published on October 31, 2001, being the 484th anniversary of the Protestant Reformation.

In 1999, World magazine reported on "feminists" noticing links between Crossway and the Council on Biblical Manhood and Womanhood (CBMW). Members of the CBMW had earlier been involved in criticizing plans made by Zondervan's New International Version (NIV) translation committee (Note: The NIV translation committee, officially called the Committee on Bible Translation (CBT), is described by Zondervan as "a self-governing body of 15 evangelical Bible scholars.") to publish a gender-neutral edition of the NIV. Grudem, who was president of the CBMW at the time, responded by stating, "This [translation] is not a CBMW project."

=== Translation oversight committee ===
Chaired by Dennis, the fourteen-member translation oversight committee was aided by more than fifty biblical experts serving as review scholars. The translation committee also received input from the advisory council, having more than fifty members. J. I. Packer served as general editor of the translation, and Leland Ryken served as literary stylist. Grudem states that the NET Bible study notes were one resource that the translation committee consulted during the translation process. He also states that the translation committee meets approximately every 5–7 years to consider text revisions.

The translation committee, as originally constituted, featured the following notable individuals:

- Clifford John Collins (professor of Old Testament, Covenant Theological Seminary)
- Wayne A. Grudem (research professor of theology and biblical studies, Phoenix Seminary)
- William D. Mounce (professor of New Testament, Gordon–Conwell Theological Seminary)
- J. I. Packer (Board of Governors' Professor of Theology, Regent College, Vancouver, Canada)
- Vern Sheridan Poythress (professor of New Testament interpretation, Westminster Theological Seminary; editor of the Westminster Theological Journal)
- Gordon Wenham (Old Testament tutor at Trinity College, Bristol; emeritus professor of Old Testament, University of Gloucestershire)

By 2011, Robert H. Mounce and William (Bill) Mounce had become emeritus members. Having served as the ESV New Testament chair, Bill Mounce's role was assigned to Vern Poythress. Writing on his personal blog in 2009, Mounce described his relationship to the ESV, having accepted a position on the NIV translation committee:

Many of you know that I was the New Testament chair of the ESV translation. This project has consumed thousands of hours, most of them enjoyable. I am happy with the ESV. ... I learned so much on the ESV, things I have never taught in any Greek class at any level. ... Here is my concern. I don't want anyone to think that I am unhappy with the ESV or that I am "jumping ship." I am not. I thoroughly enjoy reading and studying from the ESV. But if you have been reading this blog very long, you will know that I strongly believe in different translation philosophies, that there is not a "one-size-fits-all," and that the translator's responsibility is to be consistent with that stated philosophy. ... I am excited about being able to get back into translation work, but please do not read this as a reaction to the ESV. To do so would be wrong.

By late 2023, Paul R. House, J. I. Packer, (Note: Packer retired from ministry in 2016 due to eyesight deterioration.) Leland Ryken, Gordon Wenham, and Bruce Winter had retired from the translation committee. In addition, the following individuals had joined by this time:

- Josh Dennis, CEO and president of Crossway
- Dane Ortlund, senior pastor of Naperville Presbyterian Church
- Jon Dennis, senior pastor of Holy Trinity Church, Chicago
- Justin Taylor, book publisher, Crossway
- Don Jones, chief publishing officer, Bible publisher, Crossway
- Douglas O'Donnell, senior vice president of Bible publishing, Crossway
- Kevin DeYoung, senior pastor, Christ Covenant Church

=== Post-publication ===
Crossway, which operates as a not-for-profit, states that most ESV copies are "given away freely through ministry partners around the world." It has reported that the cumulative number of printed ESV Bibles distributed worldwide since 2001 reached 100 million copies by 2015, 250 million by 2021, 290 million by 2023, 300 million by 2024, 315 million by 2025, and 370 million by 2026. In 2026, Crossway CEO and president Josh Dennis reported that between 2024 and 2026, sales of the ESV "more than doubled."

In 2008, Crossway published the ESV Study Bible, which sold more than one million copies. In 2009, the Evangelical Christian Publishers Association (ECPA) named the ESV Study Bible as Christian Book of the Year. This was the first time in the award's 30-year history to be given to a study Bible. By September 2024, the ESV Study Bible had sold more than 2.5 million copies.

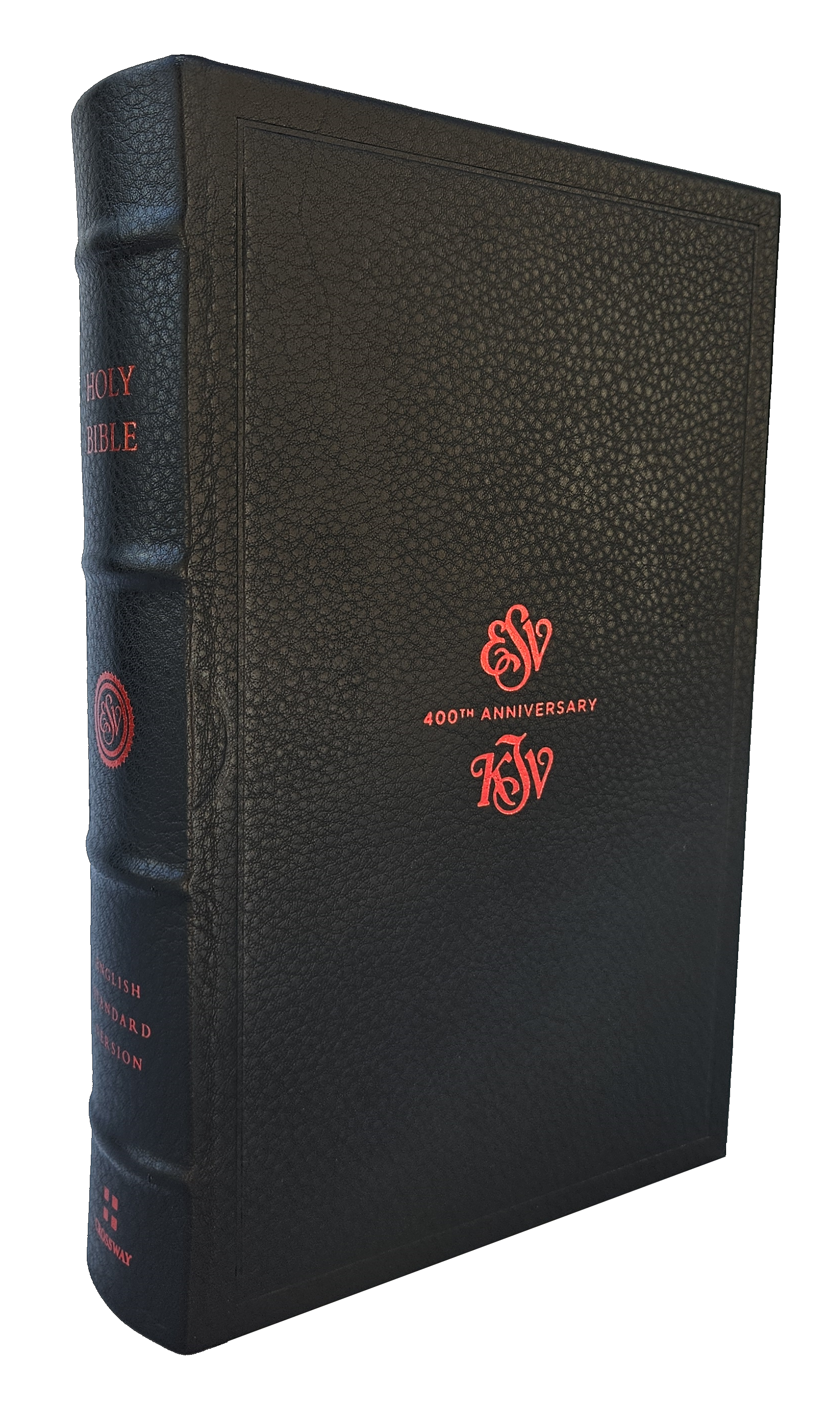
ESV New Classic Reference Bible (Commemorative Edition; top grain leather)

In 2011, Crossway published a special limited edition of the ESV New Classic Reference Bible, commemorating the 400th anniversary of the King James Version (KJV) first being published. With a foreword by Leland Ryken, it features a selection of artwork created by Makoto Fujimura for The Four Holy Gospels, a separate edition produced to match the size of the original KJV printing. (Note: The original printing of the King James Version measured 11 x 16 inches.)

In October 2024, the ESV was the number one selling Bible translation on the ECPA Bible Translations Bestsellers monthly chart. This was the first time the ESV had reached number one in the chart's history (which began in December 2011), and the first time the NIV had lost its number one spot in five years. In 2026, the Society for Promoting Christian Knowledge (SPCK) reported that the ESV was the best-selling Bible translation in the United Kingdom for 2025.

==== Debate surrounding translation philosophy ====
At the 2008 annual meeting of the Evangelical Theological Society, Mark L. Strauss presented a paper titled "Why the English Standard Version Should Not Become the Standard English Version: How To Make a Good Translation Much Better." (Note: The original formatting of the paper's title uses a play on words with regard to the name "Standard English Version.") In the paper, Strauss criticizes the ESV for using dated language, among other perceived issues, such as using gender-neutral language inconsistently in translation. ESV translator Bill Mounce responded to Strauss's criticism:

While the content of the paper was helpful, I am afraid that it only increased the gap between the two "sides" of the [translation philosophy] debate. ... He kept saying that the ESV has "missed" or "not considered" certain translational issues. While I am sure they were not intentional, these are emotionally charged words that do not help in the debate. They are in essence ad hominem arguments focusing on our competence (or perceived lack thereof) and not on the facts. He was not in the translation meetings and does not know if we in fact did miss or did not consider these issues. ... The solution to this debate is to recognize that there are different translation philosophies, different goals and means by which to reach those goals, and the goal of the translator is to be consistent in achieving those goals. In all but one of his examples, our translation was the one required by our translation philosophy.

Strauss invited Mounce to engage further through participation at the following annual meeting. In 2009, Mounce presented his formal response paper titled "Can the ESV and TNIV Co-Exist in the Same Universe?" In the paper, Mounce describes various points regarding his view of the need for both formal and functional translations.

In 2017, Eastern Orthodox philosopher David Bentley Hart, in the preface to his translation of the New Testament, argues that "in some extreme cases doctrinal or theological or moral ideologies drive translators to distort the [original] text to a discreditable degree. Certain popular translations, like the New International Version and the English Standard Version, are notorious examples of this." Hart's translation brought various praise, but also criticism—most notably from N. T. Wright, who also produced his own translation of the New Testament.

In October 2019, University of Oklahoma sociology professor Samuel L. Perry published a journal article titled "The Bible as a Product of Cultural Power: The Case of Gender Ideology in the English Standard Version." In the article, Perry attempts to demonstrate "how a more critical approach toward 'the Bible' can provide richer, more sophisticated sociological analyses of power and cultural reproduction within Christian traditions." Perry argues that Crossway's ESV translation committee made "intentional, systematic changes" into the ESV for the purpose of being able to "publish and mass-market a text more amenable to conservative, complementarian interpretations." Perry further argues that the ESV translation committee "have engaged in more covert means of cultural reproduction, not only disseminating their interpretation of the biblical text, but manipulating the text itself." In June 2021, Perry published a following journal article titled "Whitewashing Evangelical Scripture: The Case of Slavery and Antisemitism in the English Standard Version." In the article, Perry attempts to demonstrate how "the ESV editors, while modifying certain RSV renderings to establish transitivity for their text among complementarian/biblicist Christians, sought to establish intransitivity between the text and more pejorative social interpretations by progressively re-translating lexically ambiguous terms and introducing footnotes to obviate the Bible's ostensible promotion of slavery and antisemitism." In turn, Perry was interviewed by Salon regarding the content of the article. Denny Burk, professor of biblical studies at Boyce College, contends that Perry makes "a significant error" in referring to Grudem as the general editor of the ESV. (Note: J. I. Packer is the general editor of the ESV, whereas Wayne Grudem is the general editor of the ESV Study Bible.) In July 2021, Bible Study Magazine editor Mark Ward published to his personal blog a response to Perry's article:

Perry raises very important questions about Bible interpretation, and about the proper translation of fought-over words like "slave" and "Jew." ... So I carefully read not only the Salon interview but also the scholarly article in the Journal of the American Academy of Religion which gave rise to it. ... They [both] carry the same basic message. And that message is full of frankly cynical, acidic ideas about Bible study ... The first step in interpretation should be transitivity. You should try to fit what you read in the Bible in with your existing tradition. That's simple hermeneutical humility—as long as it's paired with a sincere desire to hold one's tradition up to the light of Scripture. ... I can be grateful to Perry for some sharp observations, even some warning shots, while still insisting that any view that muzzles God, that severs the link between his intentions and his words, is rebellion. ... To offer "establishing transitivity with existing views" as a wholly sufficient view of evangelical Bible use is to take a small truth and make it the whole truth. It is to say to God, "We can't hear you because other people are talking."

In 2020, the Ireland-based Association of Catholic Priests, an independent and voluntary association of Catholic clergy, criticized the ESV for its position on the use of gender-neutral language, perceiving the use of terms such as "mankind" and "brothers" to be "out of sync with modern usage [and] culturally regarded as diminishing and disrespectful of women."

== Literary attributes ==
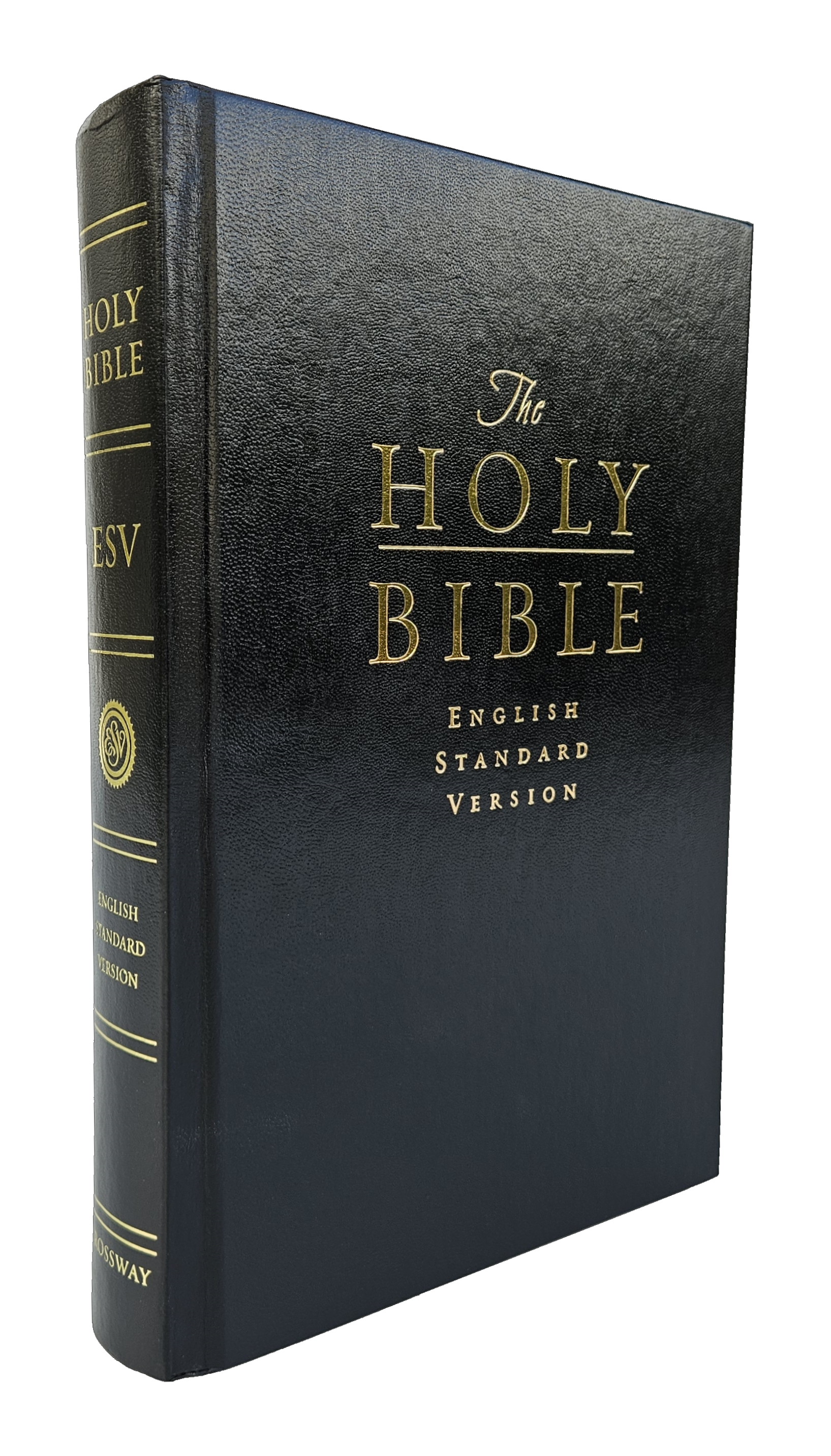
ESV Classic Pew and Worship Bible (2002 corrected ed.) (Note: The first hardcover, black edition of the ESV Pew and Worship Bible was published in December 2003.)

=== Relationship to the Revised Standard Version ===
The ESV is derived from the 1971 text edition of the Revised Standard Version. ESV translation committee member Wayne Grudem states that approximately eight percent (or about 60,000 words) of the 1971 RSV text being used for the ESV was revised as of first publication in 2001. Grudem also states that the committee removed "every trace of liberal influence that had caused such criticism from evangelicals when the RSV was first published in 1952." (Note: A few examples of reverted verses, being translated in accordance with the ESV's translation philosophy, are as follows: Isaiah 7:14 (now using "Behold, the virgin shall conceive and bear a son"), Psalm 2:12 (now using "Kiss the Son"), and Psalm 45:6 (now using "Your throne, O God, is forever and ever"). The committee also decided to restore the theological term "propitiation" to the following verses: Romans 3:25, Hebrews 2:17; and 1 John 2:2 and 4:10.) Although, Grudem also states that much of the 1971 RSV text left unchanged by the committee "is simply 'the best of the best' of the KJV tradition."

=== Style ===
Theologian Tim Challies has praised the ESV for its commitment to literary excellence:

... the book that has most shaped my writing is the Bible—the ESV. Not only is this the book I've read most over the years, but it's also the book I've studied the closest, and memorized most substantially. And then, of all the books I've read, it's one of the finest in its literary quality. ... One thing I've always loved about the ESV is its superior use of the English language. Any translation involves a trade-off between precision and readability so that the most-literal translations also tend to be the least-readable. Though the ESV is a precise Bible, its translators chose to place a premium on literary excellence. ... They succeeded well, and the Bible they translated is beautiful to read—far more than any of its contemporaries.

Crossway states that the ESV "retains theological terminology—words such as grace, faith, justification, sanctification, redemption, regeneration, reconciliation, propitiation—because of their central importance for Christian doctrine and also because the underlying Greek words were already becoming key words and technical terms among Christians in New Testament times." It also states that the ESV seeks to let the distinct writing style of each biblical writer come through the translated text.

=== Fonts ===
For print editions, Crossway primarily uses the Lexicon serif typeface, published by the Enschedé Font Foundry. For the ESV.org website and ESV Bible app, it uses the Sentinel serif typeface (based on Clarendon) as the default font, along with offering Gotham as a sans-serif alternative.

=== Position on gender-neutral language ===
In the late 1990s, controversy erupted among evangelical scholarship with regard to the pending publication of a gender-neutral version of the NIV. Prior to the publication of the ESV in 2001, ESV translators Vern Poythress and Wayne Grudem detailed their approach to the gender-neutral language debate in The Gender-Neutral Bible Controversy: Muting the Masculinity of God's Words, having been published by Broadman & Holman in 2000. In the book, Poythress and Grudem argue that contemporary feminist philosophy has affected the predispositions of some English Bible translators and theologians toward the original text, which in turn has affected the trajectory of the NIV, being the most eminent evangelical Bible translation. An updated edition was published in 2003 by Christian Focus Publications, featuring new chapters on the TNIV. In 2004, a second edition was released by Broadman & Holman, having been republished as The TNIV and the Gender-Neutral Bible Controversy.

As a formal translation, the ESV positions itself in the Bible publishing market by opting to avoid gender-neutral language, aside from "words that have no male meaning in the original [New Testament] Greek." (Note: For example, depending on the word in question, the 1971 text edition of the RSV uses "men" or "man," whereas the ESV uses "people" or "person" instead.) With regard to this issue, the ESV translation committee states that "the goal of the ESV is to render literally what is in the original." The committee further states that its objective is "transparency to the original text, allowing the reader to understand the original on its own terms rather than in the terms of our present-day Western culture."

== Revisions and other editions ==
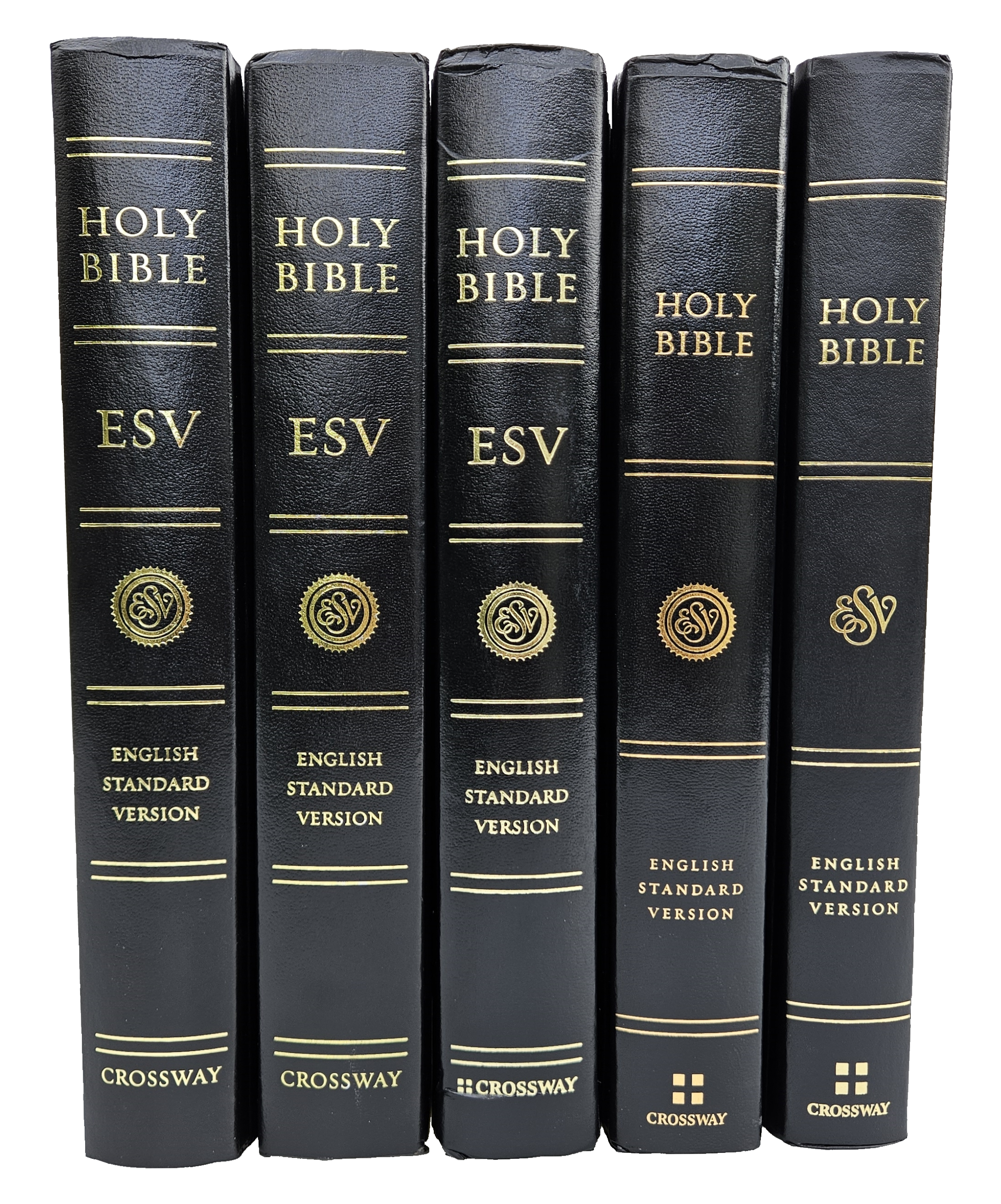
ESV Pew and Worship Bibles (2002–2016) (Note: Left to right: 2002 corrected edition, 2007 text edition, 2011 text edition, 2016 Permanent Text edition, 2016 text edition.)

=== 2002 text correction ===
In 2002, Crossway published an unannounced revision to the original 2001 text to make several corrections, these being in areas where it was believed "that a mistake had been made in translation." This includes a revision in Romans 3:9, changing "under the power of sin" to "under sin."

=== Anglicized edition ===
In 2002, Collins published the English Standard Version: Anglicized Edition in the United Kingdom. It is abbreviated as ESVUK.

=== 2007 text edition ===
Crossway published a revision of the ESV text in 2007 as "ESV Text Edition: 2007." The revision makes minor changes to the 2002 corrected edition.

=== Oxford Apocrypha edition ===
In 2009, Oxford University Press published the English Standard Version Bible with Apocrypha. This edition includes the Apocrypha, placed at the back of the Bible, intended for "denominations that use those books in liturgical readings and for students who need them for historical purposes."

=== 2011 text edition ===
Crossway published a revision of the ESV text in 2011 as "ESV Text Edition: 2011." The revision changes fewer than 500 words in total throughout 275 verses from the 2007 text. The changes were made in each case to "correct grammar, improve consistency, or increase precision in meaning." A notable revision was made in Isaiah 53:5, changing "wounded for our transgressions" to "pierced for our transgressions" in the revised text. In addition, the ESV translation committee decided to modify the use of the word "slave" (being the Greek word doulos) on a case by case basis throughout the New Testament, being retranslated to either "bondservant" or "servant" to disambiguate the context of the situation.

=== Gideons edition ===
In 2013, Gideons International permanently transitioned from the New King James Version to the ESV as their translation of choice for free of charge distribution Bibles. In addition to being granted licensing for the ESV text (for the purpose of distribution), Crossway gave Gideons International permission to modify the text to use alternative readings based on the Textus Receptus. The Gideons edition uses more than 50 alternative readings.

=== 2016 text edition ===
Crossway published a revision of the ESV text in 2016 as the "ESV Permanent Text Edition (2016)." The revision changes 52 words in total throughout 29 verses from the 2011 text. In addition, it also features an update of the textual basis for both the Old Testament and New Testament. (Note: All ESV editions up to 2011 used the 2nd edition (1983) of the Biblia Hebraica Stuttgartensia (BHS) for the Old Testament, along with the 4th corrected edition of the UBS Greek New Testament (UBSGNT) and 27th edition (1993) of the Novum Testamentum Graece (NA) for the New Testament. The 2016 text edition updates the BHS to its 5th edition (1997), the UBSGNT to its 5th edition, and NA to its 28th edition.) A notable revision was made in Genesis 3:16 to use a complementarian interpretation of the original text: switching "shall be toward" with "shall be contrary to" in the revised text. The previous rendering can be found in the footnotes (excluding any editions that specifically do not have footnotes, such as the ESV Reader's Bible). The ESV Study Bible details in its study notes the revised interpretation in relation to a parallel understanding of 3:16 with both 4:7 (which shares the Hebrew word teshuqah; this verse having also been updated in the 2016 text) and Ephesians 5:21–32.

Coinciding with the release of the revision, Crossway announced that "the text of the ESV Bible will remain unchanged in all future editions printed and published by Crossway." However, in a statement from Lane T. Dennis the following month, the new policy was abandoned "to allow for ongoing periodic updating of the text to reflect the realities of biblical scholarship such as textual discoveries or changes in English over time." In the statement, Dennis responded to public discourse surrounding the policy: "We have become convinced that this decision was a mistake. We apologize for this and for any concern this has caused for readers of the ESV." The revision was subsequently republished as "ESV Text Edition: 2016."

=== Catholic edition ===
In 2018, the Conference of Catholic Bishops of India published the ESV Catholic Edition (ESV-CE), which includes the deuterocanonical books in Catholic canonical order. With permission from Crossway, a team of Catholic scholars reviewed the text of the ESV in light of the Vatican's translation principles as set forth in Liturgiam authenticam, making approved modifications where needed to adhere to Catholic teaching. (Note: The team of scholars who worked on the ESV-CE includes "Rev. Dr. Lucien Legrand, M.E.P.; Rev. Dr. Assisi Saldanha, C.Ss.R.; Rev. Dr. Govindu Rayanna; Rev. Dr. A. Alfred Joseph; Rev. Dr. David Stanly Kumar, Sr.; Rev. Dr. Prema Vakayil, C.S.S.T.; Rev. Dr. Shabu Joseph Thottumkal, S.D.B.; and Rev. Dr. Stanislas Savarimuthu.")

In 2019, the Augustine Institute published the ESV-CE in North America as The Augustine Bible. In October 2021, following these developments, the SPCK published its own version of the ESV-CE, newly typeset and with anglicized spelling, in multiple formats.

=== Anglican edition ===
After the publication of the 2009 Oxford University Press Apocrypha edition, the Apocrypha text "was subsequently reviewed and approved by members of the ESV Translation Oversight Committee in 2017, including the special cases of Tobit and Esther (with Greek Additions)." In 2019, Anglican Liturgy Press published the ESV with Apocrypha. Like the Oxford edition, it places the Apocrypha at the back of the Bible. It was rereleased in 2023 as a bonded leather hardcover edition.

=== 2025 text edition ===
In May 2024, Grudem mentioned that the ESV translation committee was planning to meet in Wheaton, Illinois, in July 2024 to consider approximately 120 suggested changes to the ESV text. He estimated that the committee would approve around 30 to 40 of these suggestions, including "little tweaks to the wording [that] make it consistent with where we've translated the same phrase elsewhere."

In February 2025, Crossway announced the 2025 text edition of the ESV. The revision changes 68 words in total throughout 42 verses from the 2016 text. In addition, 57 footnotes were revised, and punctuation was revised in 14 verses. A notable revision was made in reverting the 2016 changes to Genesis 3:16 and 4:7, having been switched back to their previous rendering. (Note: The 2016 wording for both verses (contrary to ... but) was changed to use the original 2001 wording (for ... and).) Another notable revision was made in John 1:18, changing "the only God" to "God the only Son" in the revised text. The 2025 text edition is scheduled to be released in the second quarter of 2025, aiming to be used in more than 540 print editions by the third quarter of 2026.

== Use ==
=== Liturgical ===
==== Lutheran Church–Missouri Synod ====
In August 2006, the Lutheran Church–Missouri Synod released the Lutheran Service Book (LSB), which uses the ESV as its primary Bible text. With permission from Crossway, the LSB occasionally uses an alternative reading of the ESV in accordance with its original translation principles.

==== Roman Catholic Church ====
In April 2020, the Catholic Church in India adopted a new English lectionary that uses the ESV Catholic Edition as its Bible text (excluding the book of Psalms, where the Grail Psalms translation is used instead). In July 2020, the Bishops' Conference of Scotland approved the development of a new lectionary using the ESV-CE text.

This was followed by the Catholic Bishops' Conference of England and Wales receiving the first volume of a new lectionary using the ESV-CE text in November 2020 (which had earlier been approved for development in November 2018). The new lectionary was fully introduced at the start of Advent in 2024, although a revised version of the Grail Psalms, the Abbey Psalms and Canticles, is still used.

=== Audio Bibles ===
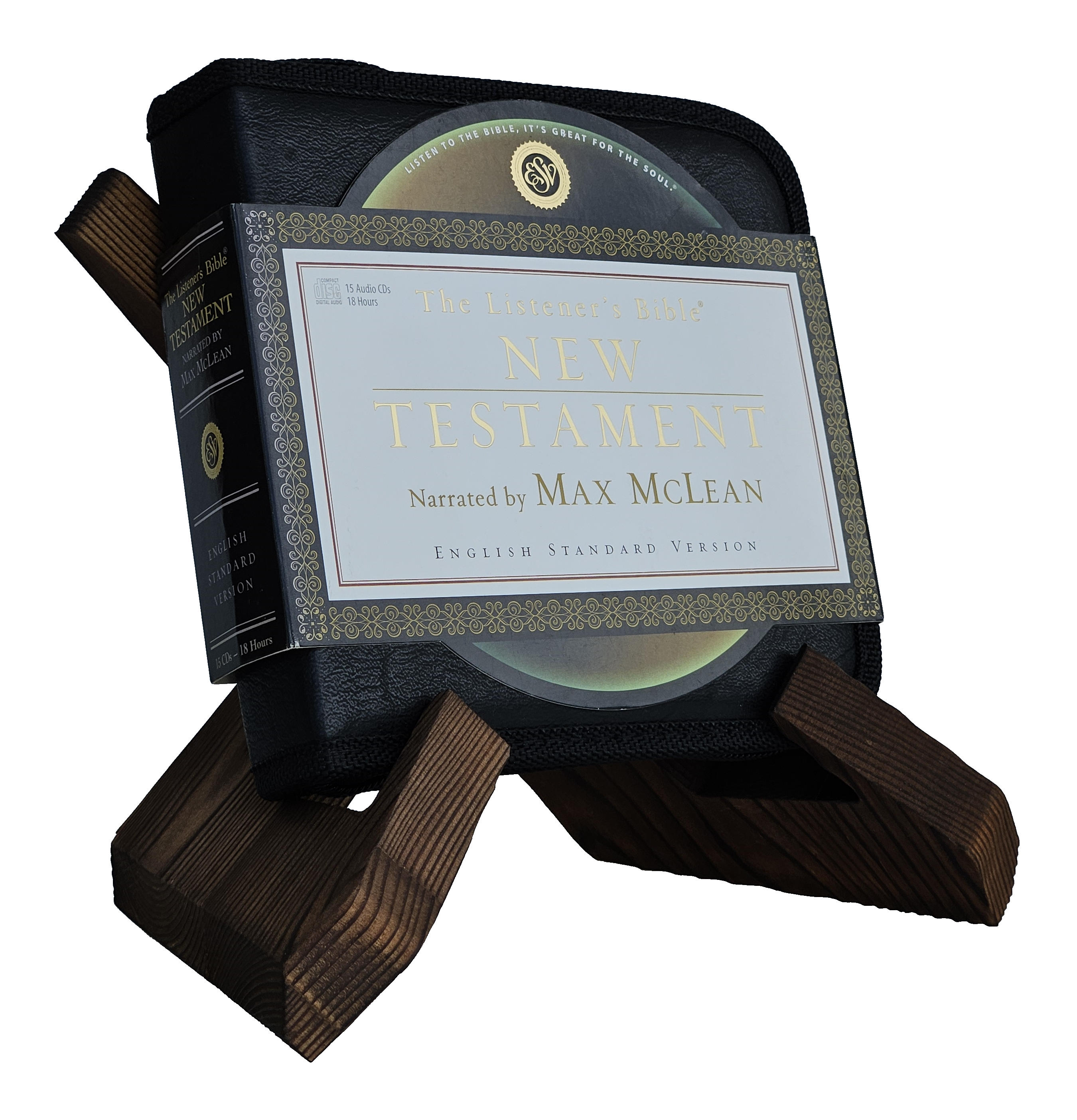
ESV Listener's Bible New Testament CDs (Max McLean)

In August 2003, Crossway released its first audio Bible, being the New Testament read by Marquis Laughlin. Shortly after, the New York City-based Fellowship for Performing Arts released an ESV audio Bible read by Max McLean, having been produced by Liz Donato and recorded under a licensing agreement. The first format released was the New Testament as a set of 12 cassette tapes, having been published by Crossway on October 31, 2003, being the 486th anniversary of the Protestant Reformation. A set of New Testament CDs was published the following month, and the full audio Bible was published in 2004. The full audio Bible was rereleased in May 2024.

In 2008, Crossway released an audio Bible featuring the voice of David Cochran Heath. This was published on October 31, 2008, being the 491st anniversary of the Protestant Reformation.

In late 2023, Crossway finished releasing six new audio Bibles, having been read by Conrad Mbewe, Kristyn Getty, Ray Ortlund Jr., Jackie Hill Perry, Robert Smith Jr., and Michael Reeves. (Note: The first new audio Bible was Getty's, having been published in August 2021.) The entire project took approximately 6,000 hours of production labor. Ortlund called his recording experience "the most exacting, precise, detailed, and demanding task I've performed since my doctoral work 40 years ago," in addition to being "immensely satisfying." Ortlund used The HarperCollins Bible Pronunciation Guide as a linguistic aid during production.

=== Study Bibles ===
The ESV has been used as the Bible text for a number of study Bible editions, including but not limited to:

- ESV study Bibles published by Crossway: the ESV Study Bible, the ESV Global Study Bible, the ESV Student Study Bible, and the ESV Literary Study Bible
- MacArthur Study Bible, published by Thomas Nelson
- The Lutheran Study Bible, published by Concordia Publishing House
- Reformation Study Bible, published by Ligonier Ministries
- Fire Bible, published by Hendrickson Publishers
- The Apocrypha: The Lutheran Edition with Notes, published by Concordia Publishing House
- Scofield Study Bible III, published by Oxford University Press
- Ryrie Study Bible, published by Moody Publishers

== See also ==
- Modern English Bible translations
