= Wayne Grudem =

American theologian and author (born 1948)

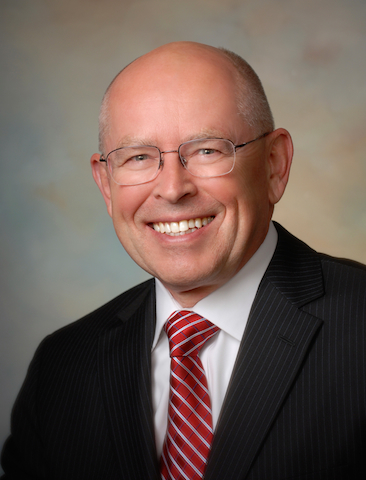
- Grudem in 2014
- Born: February 11, 1948 (age 78); Jim Falls, Wisconsin, U.S.

Academic background
- Education: Harvard University (BA); Westminster Theological Seminary (MDiv and DD); Cambridge University (PhD)
- Thesis: The Gift of Prophecy in 1 Corinthians (1982)
- Doctoral advisor: C.F.D. Moule

Academic work
- Discipline: Biblical studies
- Institutions: Trinity Evangelical Divinity School; Phoenix Seminary
- Main interests: Systematic theology; Complementarianism; Christian ethics
- Notable works: 1 Peter: An Introduction and Commentary (TNTC) (1988); Recovering Biblical Manhood and Womanhood (1991); Systematic Theology (1994, 2020); ESV Study Bible (2008); Christian Ethics (2018)
- Website: www.waynegrudem.com

Wayne A. Grudem (born February 11, 1948) is an American Reformed Baptist theologian and New Testament scholar. Known for his widely used Systematic Theology, he was a research professor of theology and biblical studies at Phoenix Seminary in Phoenix, Arizona.

== Biography ==
=== Early life and education ===
Grudem was born on February 11, 1948, in Jim Falls, Wisconsin. As a child, he attended First Baptist Church in Eau Claire, Wisconsin. He holds a BA in economics from Harvard University, an MDiv and DD from Westminster Theological Seminary, and a PhD in New Testament studies from the University of Cambridge.

=== Career ===
In 1983, Grudem became President of Christian Heritage Academy(CHA). CHA continues to operate in Northfield, IL. In 2001, Grudem became research professor of Theology and Biblical Studies at Phoenix Seminary. Prior to that, he had taught for 20 years at Trinity Evangelical Divinity School, where he was chairman of the department of biblical and systematic theology.

Grudem served on the committee overseeing the English Standard Version translation of the Bible, and from 2005 to 2008 he served as general editor for the 2.1-million-word ESV Study Bible (which was named "2009 Christian Book of the Year" by the Evangelical Christian Publishers Association). In 1999 he was the president of the Evangelical Theological Society. Grudem announced having been diagnosed with Parkinson's Disease on December 22, 2015.

On July 28, 2016, Grudem published an opinion piece on Townhall called "Why Voting for Donald Trump Is a Morally Good Choice". On October 9, the piece was retracted and replaced with one entitled "Trump's Moral Character and the Election". On October 19, the original piece was reinstated and another piece was published, entitled "If You Don't Like Either Candidate, Then Vote for Trump's Policies". Grudem endorsed Trump for re-election in 2020.

In 2018, a Festschrift was published in his honor. Scripture and the People of God: Essays in Honor of Wayne Grudem included contributions from John M. Frame, R. Kent Hughes, Ray Ortlund, John Piper, Vern Poythress, Leland Ryken, Thomas R. Schreiner, and Bruce A. Ware.

== Theology ==
He is the author of multiple books, including Systematic Theology: An Introduction to Biblical Doctrine, which advocates a Calvinistic soteriology, the inspiration and inerrancy of the Bible, believer's baptism, a plural-elder form of church government, Old Earth creationism, and the complementarian view of gender relationships. Systematic Theology is a highly influential theology textbook that has sold hundreds of thousands of copies. Grudem holds to noncessationist beliefs and was at one time a qualified supporter of the Vineyard Movement.

Grudem and Bruce A. Ware were at the center of Trinitarian debate in 2016 that began online and culminated in print publications. Both Grudem and Ware subscribe to a view of the Trinity called "eternal relations of submission and authority" or "eternal functional subordination" which claims that the Son is eternally submissive to the Father. Their view was challenged by some scholars that the Son only submits to the Father in the incarnation according to his human nature.

Grudem is also a co-founder and past president of the Council on Biblical Manhood and Womanhood. He also edited Recovering Biblical Manhood and Womanhood, Christianity Today's "Book of the Year" in 1992, with John Piper.

In 1985, Grudem authored a study of over 2000 ancient Greek references to: κεφαλή, romanized: kephale, lit. 'head', arguing that none of the metaphoric uses carry the meaning of 'source', as recent authors had argued.

All of Grudem's research on gender-related issues is now contained in his major 2012 reference work, Evangelical Feminism and Biblical Truth: An Analysis of More Than One Hundred Disputed Questions.

== Works ==
=== Books ===
- Grudem, Wayne (1982). The Gift of Prophecy in 1 Corinthians. Washington, DC: University Press of America. ISBN 978-0-81912083-0. OCLC 7975367.
- ——— (1988). The Gift of Prophecy in the New Testament and Today. Westchester, IL: Crossway Books. ISBN 978-0-89107495-3. OCLC 21874389.
- ——— (1988). 1 Peter: An Introduction and Commentary. Tyndale New Testament Commentaries. Vol. 17. Downers Grove, IL: InterVarsity Press. ISBN 978-0-83082996-5. OCLC 836536171.
- ——— (1994). Systematic Theology: An Introduction to Biblical Doctrine. Leicester, England & Grand Rapids, MI: Inter-Varsity Press & Zondervan. ISBN 978-0-95840603-1. OCLC 1036867839.
- ——— (1999). Purswell, Jeff (ed.). Bible Doctrine: Essential Teachings of the Christian Faith. Grand Rapids, MI: Zondervan. ISBN 978-0-31022233-0. OCLC 39523561. A condensed version of Systematic Theology.
- ———; Poythress, Vern S. (2000). The Gender-Neutral Bible Controversy: Muting the Masculinity of God's Words. Nashville, TN: Broadman & Holman. ISBN 978-0-80542441-6. OCLC 44413980.
- ——— (2003). Business for the Glory of God: The Bible's Teaching on the Moral Goodness of Business. Wheaton, IL: Crossway Books. ISBN 978-1-58134517-9. OCLC 53131744.
- ——— (2004). Evangelical Feminism and Biblical Truth: An Analysis of More Than One Hundred Disputed Questions. Sisters, OR: Multnomah Publishers. ISBN 978-1-57673840-5. OCLC 54897906.. Second edition Crossway, 2012.
- ———; Poythress, Vern S. (2004). The TNIV and the Gender-Neutral Bible Controversy. Nashville, TN: Broadman & Holman. ISBN 978-0-80543193-3. OCLC 57320504.
- ———; Grudem, Elliot (2005). Christian Beliefs: Twenty Basics Every Christian Should Know. Grand Rapids, MI: Zondervan. ISBN 978-0-31025599-4. OCLC 60743141. Revised and condensed edition of Bible Doctrine.
- ———; Thacker, Jerry (2005). Why Is My Choice of a Bible Translation So Important?. The Council on Biblical Manhood and Womanhood. ISBN 978-0-97739680-1.
- ——— (2006). Evangelical Feminism: A New Path to Liberalism?. Wheaton, IL: Crossway Books. ISBN 978-1-58134734-0. OCLC 65537846.
- ——— (2010). Politics According to the Bible: A Comprehensive Resource for Understanding Modern Political Issues in Light of Scripture. Grand Rapids, MI: Zondervan. ISBN 978-0-31033029-5. OCLC 555625189.
- ——— (2010). Countering the Claims of Evangelical Feminism: Over 40 Biblical Responses. Crown Publishing. ISBN 978-0-30756215-9.
- ——— (2012). Voting as a Christian: The Economic and Foreign Policy Issues. Grand Rapids, MI: Zondervan. ISBN 978-0-31049603-8. Condensed extract from Politics — According to the Bible.
- ——— (2012). Voting as a Christian: The Social Issues. Grand Rapids, MI: Zondervan. ISBN 978-0-310-49602-1. Condensed extract from Politics — According to the Bible
- ———; Asmus, Barry (2013). The Poverty of Nations: A Sustainable Solution. Wheaton, IL: Crossway Books. ISBN 978-1-43353911-4. OCLC 828143277.
- ——— (2016). "Free Grace" Theology: 5 Ways It Diminishes the Gospel. Wheaton, IL: Crossway Books. ISBN 978-1-4335-5114-7.
- ———; Piper, John (2016). Fifty Crucial Questions: An Overview of Central Concerns About Manhood and Womanhood. Wheaton, IL: Crossway Books. ISBN 978-1-43355184-0.
- ———; Moreland, J.P.; Meyer, Stepen C.; Shaw, Christopher; Gauger, Ann K. (2017). Theistic Evolution: A Scientific, Philosophical, and Theological Critique. Wheaton, IL: Crossway Books. ISBN 978-1-43355286-1.
- ——— (2018). Christian Ethics: An Introduction to Biblical Moral Reasoning. Wheaton, IL: Crossway Books. ISBN 978-1-43354965-6.

=== As editor ===
- ———; Piper, John, eds. (1991). Recovering Biblical Manhood and Womanhood: A Response to Evangelical Feminism. Wheaton, IL: Crossway Books. ISBN 9780891075868. OCLC 22629898.
- ———, ed. (1996). Are Miraculous Gifts for Today?: four views. Grand Rapids, MI: Zondervan. ISBN 9780310201557. OCLC 34691457.
- ———; Rainey, Dennis, eds. (2003). Pastoral Leadership for Manhood and Womanhood. Foundations for the Family. Vol. 4. Wheaton, IL: Crossway Books. ISBN 9781433516313.
- ———; Collins, C. John; Schreiner, Thomas R., eds. (2012). Understanding Scripture: an overview of the Bible's origin, reliability, and meaning. Wheaton, IL: Crossway Books. ISBN 9781433529993. OCLC 746833655.
- ———; Collins, C. John; Schreiner, Thomas R., eds. (2012). Understanding the big picture of the Bible : a guide to reading the Bible well. Wheaton, IL: Crossway Books. ISBN 9781433531620. OCLC 767974206.

=== Articles and chapters ===
- ——— (1985). "Does kephalē ('head') mean 'source' or 'authority over' in Greek literature? - a survey of 2,336 examples". In George W. Knight III (ed.). The Role Relationship of Men and Women: New Testament teaching. Chicago, IL: Moody Press. ISBN 9780802473691. OCLC 11785448.
- ——— (2012). "Biblical Evidence for the Eternal Submission of the Son to the Father" (PDF). In Dennis W. Jowers; H. Wayne House (eds.). The New Evangelical Subordinationism? Perspectives on the Equality of God the Father and God the Son. Wipf and Stock Publishers. pp. 223–261. ISBN 978-1-60899-852-4.
- ——— (2012). "The English Standard Version (ESV)". In Köstenberger, Andreas J.; Croteau, David A. (eds.). Which Bible Translation Should I Use?: A Comparison of 4 Major Recent Versions. Nashville, TN: B&H Publishing Group. ISBN 9781433676468.

=== Video courses ===
- Christian Beliefs DVD Discipleship Course

=== Journals ===
- Biblical Foundations for Manhood and Womanhood (editor)
