= Eternal functional subordination =

Trinitarian doctrine

Eternal functional subordination (EFS) or Eternal subordination of the Son (ESS) is a Trinitarian doctrine among some New Calvinist theologians that proposes a hierarchy within the trinity. In this view, though the Son is ontologically equal to the Father, he is subordinate in role, obeying the Father in eternity. The view is contested among scholars and has been used to justify complementarianism.

== History ==
Advocates of eternal subordination generally see this as a model for human relationships. EFS is contrasted with the view held by Augustine, where the obedience of the Son to the Father is only by virtue of His human nature. Two prominent modern advocates of EFS are Wayne Grudem and Bruce Ware, though they often use the monicker "eternal relations of authority and submission" to further nuance their view.

Grudem asserts that the Son eternally submits to the Father, emphasizing that authority is not an inherent attribute of God but rather a feature of relational dynamics within the Trinity. While Grudem denies that the doctrine of eternal subordination entails three separate wills in God, he maintains that God possesses a single will expressed uniquely through the three persons of the Trinity. However, its critics have argued that Wayne Grudem's view of the divine will is contradictory.

Grudem argued that EFS has been affirmed by many theologians within the last few centuries, including Carl F. H. Henry, Jonathan Edwards, Charles Ryrie, Charles Hodge and others. However, his interpretation of some of these theologians has been challenged.

Although EFS has been used to justify complementarian views, it has gained criticism from both complementarian and egalitarian theologians. EFS has been criticized by theologians such as Glenn Butner, Matthew Barrett, Michael Bird, R. Scott Clark, Jacqueline Service, Michael Horton, Craig S. Keener, Peter Carnley, Terran Williams and Kevin Giles.

== See also ==
- Subordinationism
- Social Trinitarianism
