= Leland Ryken =

American professor of literature (born 1942)

Leland Ryken (born May 17, 1942) is professor emeritus of English at Wheaton College in Wheaton, Illinois. He has contributed a number of works to the study of classic literature from the Christian perspective, including editing the comprehensive volume on Christian writing on literature The Christian Imagination. He was the literary stylist for the English Standard Version of the Bible, published by Crossway Bibles in 2001. He is the author of How to Read the Bible as Literature and Words of Delight: A Literary Introduction to the Bible, as well as co-editor of Ryken's Bible Handbook and the ESV Literary Study Bible (with his son, Philip Ryken). He was the literary content contributor to the ESV Study Bible, released in 2008.

== Bibliography ==
- Apocalyptic Vision in "Paradise Lost". ISBN 0-80140546-7 (1970).
- The Literature of the Bible. ISBN 0-31032411-4 (1974).
- Triumphs of the Imagination: Literature in Christian Perspective. ISBN 0-87784583-2 (1979).
- Milton and Scriptural Tradition: The Bible into Poetry. ISBN 0-82620427-9 (1984).
- How to Read the Bible as Literature. ISBN 0-31039021-4 (1985).
- The New Testament in Literary Criticism. ISBN 0-80443271-6 (1985).
- Words of Life: A Literary Introduction to the New Testament. ISBN 0-80107747-8 (1987).
- With James C. Wilhoit, 1988, Effective Bible Teaching. ISBN 978-0-80104860-9.
- Worldly Saints: The Puritans As They Really Were. ISBN 0-31032501-3 (1990).
- Contemporary Literary Theory: A Christian Appraisal. ISBN 0-80280479-9 (1991).
- A Complete Literary Guide to the Bible. ISBN 0-31023078-0 (1993).
- Words of Delight: A Literary Introduction to the Bible. ISBN 0-80107769-9 (1993).
- The Discerning Reader: Christian Perspectives on Literature and Theory. ISBN 0-80102085-9 (1995).
- Redeeming the Time: A Christian Approach to Work and Leisure. ISBN 0-80105169-X (1995).
- Windows to the World: Literature in Christian Perspective. ISBN 1-57910340-5 (2000).
- The Christian Imagination: The Practice of Faith in Literature and Writing. ISBN 0-87788123-5 (2002).
- Reading for Life: 100 Christian College Teachers Reflect on the Books That Shaped Their Lives. ISBN 1-40104870-6 (2002).
- The Word of God in English: Criteria for Excellence in Bible Translation. ISBN 1-58134464-3 (2002).
- Work and Leisure in Christian Perspective. ISBN 1-57910959-4 (2002).
- Realms of Gold: The Classics in Christian Perspective. ISBN 1-59244340-0 (2003).
- A Reader's Guide Through the Wardrobe: Exploring C.S. Lewis's Classic Story. ISBN 0-83083289-0 (2005).
- Choosing a Bible: Understanding Bible Translation Differences. ISBN 1-58134730-8 (2005).
- The Liberated Imagination: Thinking Christianly about the Arts. ISBN 1-59752314-3 (2005).
- Ryken's Bible Handbook. ISBN 0-84238401-4 (2005).
- Translating Truth: The Case for Essentially Literal Bible Translation. ISBN 1-58134755-3 (2005).
- The Literary Study Bible: ESV. ISBN 1-58134808-8 (2007).
- A Reader's Guide to Caspian: A Journey into C.S. Lewis's Narnia. ISBN 0-83083499-0 (2008).
- Preach the Word: Essays on Expository Preaching: In Honor of R. Kent Hughes. ISBN 1-58134926-2 (2008).
- Understanding English Bible Translation: The Case for an Essentially Literal Approach. ISBN 1-43350279-8 (2009).
- The Legacy of the King James Bible: Celebrating 400 Years of the Most Influential English Translation. ISBN 1-43351388-9 (2010).
