= Western Seminary =

Graduate school of theology in the United States

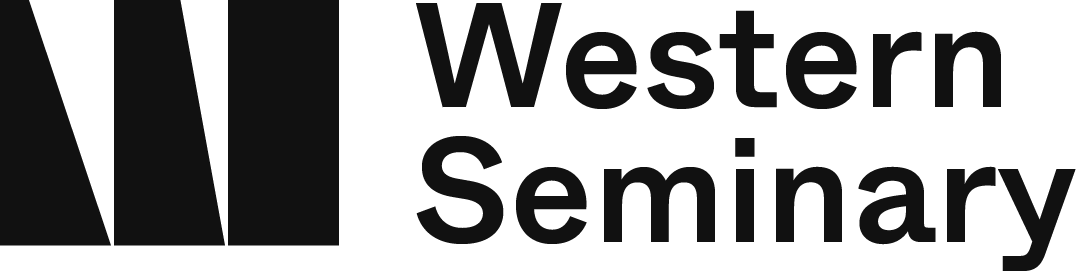
- Western Seminary Logo
- Former name: Western Baptist Theological Seminary
- Motto: Trustworthy and Accessible Training for Gospel-centered Transformation.
- Type: Private seminary
- Established: 1927
- Religious affiliation: Venture Church Network
- President: Charles Conniry
- Students: 980
- Location: Portland, Oregon, Milpitas, California, Sacramento, California, Seattle, Washington, United States
- Campus: Urban
- Colors: Orange and Black
- Website: www.westernseminary.edu

Western Seminary is an interdenominational Evangelical Christian seminary with campuses in Portland, Oregon and San Jose, California. Western Seminary also has online-only degrees and programs and offers cohorts at partner churches around the U.S.

== History ==
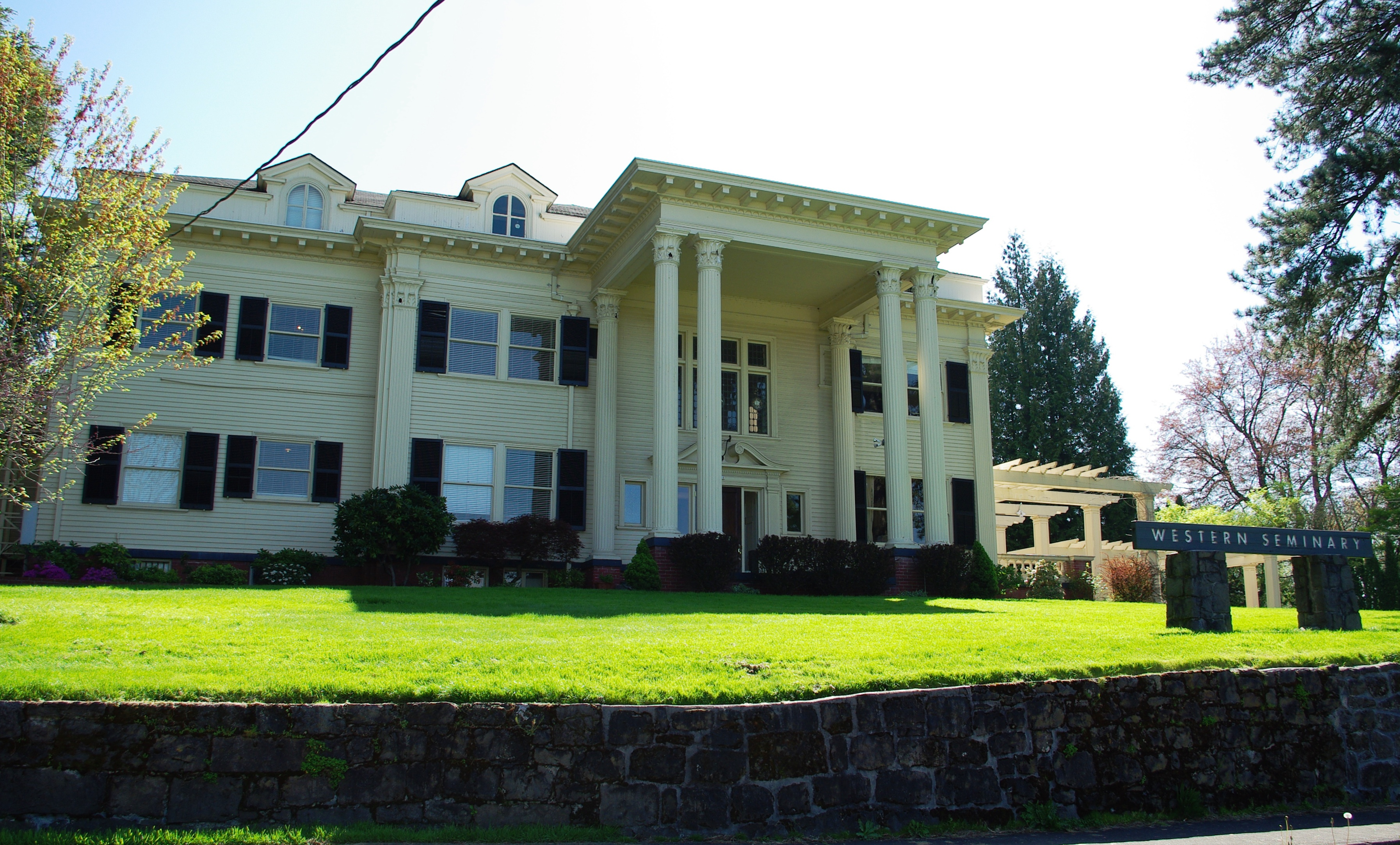
Armstrong Hall at the Portland campus

Portland Baptist Bible Institute was organized in the winter of 1925 through the work of Walter B. Hinson. In the following year, further efforts were begun to establish a graduate-level seminary to provide a theological education of greater depth in the Northwestern United States. The Western Baptist Theological Seminary was officially dedicated on October 4, 1927.

The board acquired the Philip Buehner House, now Armstrong Hall, and 5 acres (2.0 ha) of land on the west slope of Portland's Mt. Tabor in 1944. Additional structures were built and classes convened at the new site in the fall of that year. The Portland campus continues to operate at this site at the crest of the Hawthorne District.

The Western Baptist Theological Seminary became Western Seminary. Western Seminary has opened several extension campus locations in the Western United States. The first branch campus was launched in San Jose, California in 1986, followed by another in Phoenix, Arizona in 1988. A Sacramento, California campus was opened in 1991, as was the former Seattle, Washington campus in 1992. The Phoenix campus has become an independent seminary, Phoenix Seminary. Western Seminary's former Seattle campus is now The Seattle School of Theology & Psychology (formerly Mars Hill Graduate School).

Western's presidents have been reputable leaders in theological education, including Earl D. Radmacher (1965–1989), Bert Downs (1998–2008) and Randal Roberts (2008–2021). Since February 2021, the president is Chuck Conniry. Dr. Earl Radmacher became president of Western Seminary in 1965 at age 34, the youngest seminary president in the country, leading a school of 90 students. Six years of effort in recruiting faculty and students saw the student body increase to 600 students. Dr. Radmacher led the institution as its president for a total of 25 years.

Western has developed many solutions to help non-residential students complete their coursework. Western was one of the earliest institutions to offer the Doctor of Ministry degree, with modular scheduling for easy out of state access. In 1981, Western began an online-only program that served hundreds of students per year in study centers across America and overseas through interactive video curriculum. In adapting courses to DVD and online streaming formats, the Western Seminary Online Campus offers distance learning courses and programs.

In 2005, Western expanded its training sites along the west coast by establishing learning cohorts in such cities as Seattle and Richland, Washington, Reno, Nevada and Bakersfield, California.

In 2010, the San Jose, California campus relocated to Santa Clara, California.

In 2013, Western Seminary changed the name of its online learning department to Western Seminary Online Campus (formerly "Center for Lifelong Learning") as it began to offer its fully online degree program.

In 2014, the seminary launched a Seattle Teaching Site in Bellevue, Washington to offer classes to the Puget Sound Area. This site was closed in 2020 and replaced by a "pop-up" model. The Sacramento, California campus relocated to a new facility in the Sacramento community of Rocklin, California.

In 2016, the San Jose, California campus relocated to Milpitas, California.

During the COVID-19 pandemic, the Portland seminary received $1 million to $2 million (equivalent to $1.24 million to $2.49 million in 2025) in federally backed small business loan from Columbia State Bank as part of the Paycheck Protection Program. The company stated it would allow them to retain an undefined number of jobs.

== Academics ==
Western Seminary offers the Master of Arts (MA), Master of Divinity (M.Div.) and Master of Theology (Th.M.) degrees. It also offers the Doctor of Intercultural Studies, Doctor of Ministry (D.Min.), Doctor of Education (Ed.D.) and Doctor of Philosophy (Ph.D.) degrees as well as non-credit programs.

=== Theology and philosophy of ministry ===
Western Seminary is dedicated to "gospel-centered transformation." The seminary centers all learning and experience – in and out of the classroom – on the gospel.

Though Western Seminary students come from a large number of Christian denominations and non-denominational churches, the faculty teaches a conservative and evangelical Christian doctrine, with a philosophy of ministry in and alongside the church. Western Seminary regards the Bible as the infallible and inerrant word of God.

== Accreditation ==
Western Seminary is accredited to award master's and doctorate degrees by the Northwest Commission on Colleges and Universities (NWCCU) and is an accredited member of the Association of Theological Schools in the United States and Canada (ATS).

The seminary is also a partner with Jerusalem University College in Jerusalem, Israel, as well as a charter member of the Institute of Theological Studies (ITS).

== Publications ==
Western Magazine is a print publication produced semi-annually by Western Seminary and is sent to alumni, supporters, and friends of the Seminary.

'Renewal' is an electronic newsletter published by Western Seminary and sent to alumni, supporters, and friends of the Seminary.

'Transformed' is a blog composed by faculty and alumni of Western Seminary, which was launched in October 2011 to help initiate renewal to the Christian Church community. Articles address a variety of disciplines, including the Bible, theology, ministry practice, leadership, discipleship, culture and reviews of various media that pertain to Christian living.

The Spurgeon Fellowship Journal was inaugurated in October 2007 in an effort "to equip pastors to bring classic pastoral wisdom to bear upon modern ministry challenges." The journal is published online three times a year, focusing each edition on one of three areas: The Pastoral Identity, The Pastoral Task and the Pastoral Confession. Journal articles are contributed by Western Seminary faculty, as well as theologians and pastors around the country.

Food Trucks In Babylon is the official podcast of Western Seminary. The show explores how to live faithfully in a post-christian world and is hosted by Dr. Todd Miles and Dr. Ryan Lister.

== Notable alumni ==
- Craig A. Evans (Master of Divinity from Western Baptist Seminary)
- Robert B. Pamplin, Jr. (Masters of Arts in Theology (1978) and a Doctor of Ministry in Theology (1982) from Western Seminary)
- Thomas R. Schreiner (M.Div. and Th.M.)
- Dan Kimball
- Tim LaHaye
- Tim Mackie (co-founder of BibleProject)
- Matt Mikalatos
- Mark Driscoll (pastor) (Master of Arts degree in exegetical theology from Western Seminary)
- Bruce A. Ware (M.Div. (1978) and Th.M. (1980) from Western Conservative Baptist Seminary)
- George I. Mavrodes (B.D. degree (1953) from Western Baptist Theological Seminary)
- Stu Weber (Master of Divinity from Western Seminary)
- Bruce Wilkinson (D.D. from Western Conservative Baptist Seminary)
- Gary P. Weeden
- Alexander R. Gonzales (Master of Divinity; Associate Professor of Bible Exposition at Dallas Theological Seminary)
