= Dan Kimball =

American author

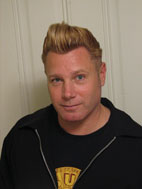
Dan Kimball

Dan Kimball is an author and was a leading voice in the beginning years of the Emerging Church movement in the United States.

Kimball's writings focus on encouraging churches and Christians to creatively make any changes needed in order to break the negative stereotypes of church and Christianity that inaccurately may exist. Kimball focuses on doing this through the arts, apologetics and Christians removing themselves from the Christian subculture. Kimball began using phrases such as "Vintage Faith" and "Vintage Christianity" which are used to express the desire to be returning to the historical and missional values of the original Christian Church and teachings of Jesus.

== Education ==
Kimball is a graduate of Multnomah Biblical Seminary and Western Seminary. He also has a doctorate in leadership from George Fox University.

== Vintage Faith Church ==
Vintage Faith's vision statement identifies their desire to be a "worshipping community of missional theologians".

The church, along with Kimball's writings, focuses on re-thinking church through a missional lens for new generations and culture. This includes designing worship services that use art, prayer stations, and other creative and artistic forms of worship in addition to preaching and singing. As part of this mission oriented vision using the arts, Vintage Faith Church opened a 7-day a week coffeehouse, art gallery and music venue in the church building called The Abbey in Santa Cruz, California.

== Teaching ==
Kimball serves as a faculty member and director of the ReGeneration Project at Western Seminary, and as adjunct faculty at other universities including George Fox University.

== Philosophy ==
Much of Kimball's writings question the existing forms of church and their effectiveness in an increasingly post-Christian culture. However, he stresses that while change in the church is needed, the historical doctrines of the Christian faith do not need to change. Much of his writings focus on ways that methods of worship, preaching, church structure, evangelism and leadership need to change in order to be missional in a post-Christian or postmodern culture.

=== Books ===
Kimball's first book, The Emerging Church, describes his realization that even in a seemingly successful and large church that he was part of (at the time) was not making the shift to living in a post-Christian culture. He describes how this recognition led him to change his methods of church ministry to see emerging generations part of the church. The Emerging Church details the specific methods of worship, preaching, leadership, evangelism and spiritual formation and why change is needed.

They Like Jesus But Not The Church is based on a series of interviews with non-Christians about how they feel about the Church and Jesus. The conversations reveal that while many people have a positive impression of Jesus, they have a dislike of the Church. The book discusses what the Church has done to foster these views, and how to address them. Kimball encourages Christians to leave the "Christian bubble" and listen to what non-Christians are saying.

Adventures in Churchland: Finding Jesus in the Mess of Organized Religion (with the foreword written by Wanda Jackson, Rock and Roll Hall of Fame recipient) looks at what church is or isn't according to the Bible.

How (Not) To Read The Bible: Making Sense of the Anti-Women, Anti-Science, Pro-Violence, Pro-Slavery and Other Crazy-Sounding Parts of Scripture addresses the way the Bible is often misused and misunderstood by not looking at it through the contextual lens of the original readers. A look at specific Bible verses that seem to indicate that there are commands to not eat shrimp or get tattoos, that women should submit and not speak in church, to commit genocide, to endorse slavery and others are examined.

== Bibliography ==
- The Emerging Church: Vintage Christianity for New Generations, 2003. Zondervan, ISBN 0-310-24564-8 (foreword by Rick Warren)
- Emerging Worship: Creating Worship Gatherings for New Generations, 2004. Zondervan, ISBN 0-310-25644-5
- They Like Jesus, But Not The Church: Insights From Emerging Generations, 2007. Zondervan, ISBN 0-310-24590-7
- Listening to the Beliefs of Emerging Churches: Five Views, (contributor), 2007. Zondervan, ISBN 0-310-27135-5
- They Like Jesus, But Not The Church Curriculum Kit, 2008. Zondervan, ISBN 0-310-27787-6
- Adventures in Churchland: Finding Jesus in the Mess of Organized Religion, 2012. Zondervan, ISBN 0-310-27556-3 (foreword by Wanda Jackson)
- How (Not) To Read the Bible: Making Sense of the Anti-women, Anti-Science, Pro-Violence, Pro-Slavery and other Crazy Sounding Parts of Scripture, 2020. Zondervan, ISBN 0-310-25418-3
