= Stu Weber =

Stu Weber is an American pastor and author of several books on Christian living. He co-founded Good Shepherd Community Church near Gresham, Oregon, and served as Lead Pastor for more than thirty years before retiring to become Pastor Emeritus.

During the Vietnam War, Weber served as a Group Intelligence Operations Officer in the Special Forces (United States Army) in Vietnam and received three bronze stars. He graduated from Wheaton College and earned a Master of Divinity from Western Seminary in Portland, Oregon following his time in the Army.
