= Matt Mikalatos =

Christian author, speaker, and missionary

- Education: University of California, Riverside, Western Seminary
- Occupations: author, speaker, missionary
- Spouse: Krista
- Children: three daughters
- Writing career
- Genres: Comedy theology, fantasy
- Notable works: Night of the Living Dead Christian, My Imaginary Jesus, The Sword of Six Worlds, "The First Time We Saw Him"
- Website: mikalatos.com

Matt Mikalatos is a Christian author, speaker, and missionary. He is based out of the Portland area and is the author of the comedy theology novels Night of the Living Dead Christian and My Imaginary Jesus, as well as the fantasy novel The Sword of Six Worlds.

== Biography ==
=== Schooling and Work ===
Matt Mikalatos graduated from University of California, Riverside and Western Seminary. During college breaks, Mikalatos worked at the Concord, California Flying Colors Comics store. For a time he worked as a high school teacher. As of 2010, Mikalatos had spent eleven years as a staff member with Cru. He has traveled abroad as a missionary to Croatia, Spain, and multiple parts of Asia. Mikalatos also works as a speaker for various events. He has published articles in periodicals such as Discipleship Journal, The Wittenburg Door, Relief, and Coach's Midnight Diner, along with writing books. In an interview in August 2012, Mikalatos stated that he was working on "a non-fiction book about how and why we talk about Jesus" and "a re-telling of the stories of Jesus in modern day called Jesus In the Real World".

=== Family ===
Mikalatos currently lives in Vancouver, Washington, near Portland, Oregon. He lives with his wife, Krista, and their three daughters.

== Books ==
- Imaginary Jesus (March 2010) ISBN 978-1414335636
- Night of the Living Dead Christian (September 2011) ISBN 978-1414338804
- My Imaginary Jesus (March 2012 republishing of Imaginary Jesus)
- The Sword of Six Worlds (December 2012)
- The First Time We Saw Him (June 2014)

=== Imaginary Jesus ===
Matt Mikalatos, the main character in this book, discovers that the Jesus he's been with is a fake, and goes searching for the real one, all the while encountering many other "imaginary Jesuses" along the way. It is semi-autobiographical in nature, and is often publicized as a "not-quite-true story." Various details, such as The Red and Black café, some conversations in the novel, and aspects of the character "Motorcycle Guy" are all true, as well as more personal details such as a miscarriage. A stage play version of Imaginary Jesus debuted in St. Louis in November 2012.

=== Night of the Living Dead Christian ===
Mikalatos again puts himself as the main character of the book, in which he tries to aid his neighbor, Luther, in dealing with his nature as a werewolf. Throughout the novel, Mikalatos discovers other monsters in his church and community.

=== My Imaginary Jesus ===
My Imaginary Jesus is a republishing of Imaginary Jesus by Tyndale Publishers with a new cover. It contains an introduction by author David Kinnaman, a discussion guide, and an interview with Mikalatos that the original publishing, Imaginary Jesus, did not.

=== The Sword of Six Worlds ===
This is Mikalatos' first fantasy novel, published by Cappella books. The main character is middle-schooler Validus Smith who finds out that she is a paladin and has to find the Sword of Six Worlds save the humanity from an evil known as the Blight, which is threatening it. It is the first in the Adventures of Validus Smith series.

== Reception ==
Relevant magazine described Imaginary Jesus as "Monty Python meets C.S. Lewis", and Night of the Living Dead Christian with "This book is outstanding. We need more totally silly, totally serious theology like Matt gives us." Publishers Weekly praised Imaginary Jesus as well, saying "Startling, contemporary, meaningful. . . . Mixing questions of suffering and free will with a nexus of weirdness." Although other reviewers acknowledged that his non sequitur style is not appealing to everyone, overall reception of Mikalatos' work has been positive.

== Writing influences ==
In an interview with Christian Audio, Mikalatos cited multiple sources as influences and inspirations for Imaginary Jesus and his writing in general. Dante's Inferno gave him inspiration for the semi-autobiographical structure of Imaginary Jesus in the way he put himself as the main character and still dealt with big theological themes. He also cited Flannery O'Connor, G. K. Chesterton for showing him that he could "get away with being funny," and C. S. Lewis for demonstrating that he could "do weird, funny things and still have positive outcome for reader." He also talked of his respect for science fiction author Gene Wolf for his writing style, and John Steinbeck for the way he wrestles with spiritual questions, especially in East of Eden.
