= Talbot Seminary Phoenix =

Christian seminary in Phoenix, Arizona, US

- Type: Seminary
- Established: 1988; 38 years ago (as Western Seminary Phoenix); 1994; 32 years ago (became independent); 2026; 0 years ago (acquired by Biola University)
- Parent institution: Biola University
- Academic affiliations: Talbot School of Theology
- Dean: Matthew Bingham
- Students: 300
- Location: Scottsdale, Arizona, United States; 33.5815°N 111.91059°W
- Website: biola.edu/TalbotPhoenix

Talbot Seminary Phoenix (formerly Phoenix Seminary) is a nondenominational, conservative evangelical Christian seminary in Scottsdale, Arizona, United States. In June 2026 the seminary was acquired by Biola University and began to merge with Biola's Talbot School of Theology.

== History ==
The seminary was founded in 1988 as a branch campus of Western Seminary and became independent in 1994.

With attendance declining since 2020 to approximately 300 students and a multi-million dollar budget deficit, the seminary’s board reached out to Biola University near Los Angeles about acquiring the seminary for free and merging it with Biola’s own seminary, Talbot School of Theology. In June 2026, both institutions announced the merger and that the seminary would be renamed Talbot Seminary Phoenix with classes expected to begin in August. The combined school will enroll more than 1,800 graduate students, making it the second largest nondenominational evangelical seminary in the world, behind only Dallas Theological Seminary.

== Academics ==
The seminary is accredited by the Association of Theological Schools in the United States and Canada and the Higher Learning Commission. The Arizona State Board of Private Postsecondary Education has licensed Phoenix Seminary to offer the Master of Arts in Counseling degree.

The seminary offers several degrees, including: Master of Divinity (M.Div.), Master of Arts (MA) in Biblical and Theological Studies, Master of Arts in Counseling, Master of Arts in Ministry, Master of Theology (Th.M.), and Doctor of Ministry (D.Min.). The seminary partners with Ottawa University in a Master of Arts in Professional Counseling program. The seminary also offers a Graduate Diploma in Biblical Studies.

== Campus ==
Classes were held at the former Scottsdale campus from 2000 through 2005. In 2005 the seminary moved to a new building in downtown Phoenix. In 2017 the seminary moved back to Scottsdale to a new campus. Following the acquisition by Biola University the seminary is expected to stay at its current location.

== Notable people ==
=== Alumni ===
- Tara Jackson, lawyer and politician

=== Faculty ===
- Wayne Grudem
