= Faith International University & Seminary =

Coordinates: 47°16′49″N 122°31′00″W

- Former name: Faith Evangelical Lutheran Seminary
- Type: Private
- Established: 1969
- President: Michael Adams
- Students: 473
- Undergraduates: 196
- Postgraduates: 196
- Location: Tacoma, Washington, Washington, United States
- Website: www.faithiu.edu

Faith International University & Seminary is an evangelical Christian college and seminary in Tacoma, Washington, United States. The school grants degrees supporting the ministry.

== Attendance and faculty ==
Faith International University & Seminary has approximately 450 to 500 students. The school employs 34 faculty members plus visiting lecturers and additional administration and staff.

== Academics ==
Faith International University & Seminary offers the Bachelor of Arts degree, Master of Arts degree, doctorate degrees, and graduate certificates; many degree programs focus specifically on religious studies.

== History ==
Faith International University & Seminary was founded in 1969 as Faith Evangelical Lutheran Seminary by Lutherans Alert-National (LAN), an organization committed to sustaining the teaching and practice of biblical inerrancy and with a [quia] subscription to the historic confessions of the Lutheran church contained in the 1580 Book of Concord. In 1968, the LAN was commissioned to investigate possible avenues of proclaiming historic, biblical theology because a significant part of the church was moving toward liberalism. It eventually seemed expedient to recommend the establishment of a seminary committed to the inerrant Word of God. The Rev. Dr. R. H. Redal was called as the first president and the initial classes were held September 23, 1969, in Tacoma, Washington.

== Global outreach ==
The institution established an educational outreach in the Kingdom of Tonga (South Pacific) in 1992 in conjunction with Polynesian Missions. The institution offers distance education (DVD) courses (augmented by resident teaching in Tonga).

== Korean Division ==
The institution has a Korean Division for the Bachelor of Arts in Religion, Master of Arts Christian Ministry (Christian Counseling concentration), Master of Arts Theological Studies (Interdisciplinary program), and Master of Divinity programs. Courses are taught in Korean and English and are offered through a local resident program.

== Chinese Division ==
The institution has a Chinese Division for the Graduate Certificate in Leadership (Professional Development). Courses are taught in Chinese and are offered online and though a local resident program.
