= Systematic Theology (book) =

1994 book by Wayne Grudem

Systematic Theology: An Introduction to Biblical Doctrine
- Author: Wayne Grudem
- Genre: Theology
- Publisher: Zondervan
- Publication date: 1994, 2020

Systematic Theology: An Introduction to Biblical Doctrine is a 1994 book by the American Christian theologian Wayne Grudem. An introductory textbook, Systematic Theology covers several theological topics in Christian systematic theology. It is one of the most sold Systematic Theology books with over 1 million copies sold as of 2020. In 2020 an updated enlarged second edition was released.

It is published by Zondervan, and is written from an Evangelical perspective. It is one of the most widely sold and distributed books in the United States on the subject of Christian systematic theology, and one of the bestselling Protestant theology books in the country.
