= ESV Study Bible =

Study Bible published by Crossway

- ESV Study Bible (Hardcover)
- Language: English
- Genre: Christian literature
- Publisher: Crossway
- Publication date: October 15, 2008
- Publication place: United States
- Pages: 2,752
- ISBN: 1-4335-0241-0

The ESV Study Bible (abbreviated as the ESVSB) is a study Bible published by Crossway. Using the text of the English Standard Version, the ESVSB features study notes from a perspective of "classic evangelical orthodoxy, in the historic stream of the Reformation."

== Contributors ==
The ESV Study Bible features the work of "95 evangelical Christian scholars and teachers." The list of contributors found in the ESVSB contains the following notable biblical scholars:

- Clifford John Collins (Professor of Old Testament, Covenant Theological Seminary)
- Wayne A. Grudem (Research Professor, Theology and Biblical Studies, Phoenix Seminary)
- J. I. Packer (Board of Governors Professor of Theology, Regent College, Vancouver, Canada)
- Vern Sheridan Poythress (Professor of New Testament Interpretation, Westminster Theological Seminary; Editor, Westminster Theological Journal)
- Thomas R. Schreiner (Professor of New Testament Interpretation, The Southern Baptist Theological Seminary)
- Gordon Wenham (Old Testament Tutor at Trinity College, Bristol; Emeritus Professor of Old Testament, University of Gloucestershire)

== Reception ==
=== Commercial performance ===
The ESV Study Bible was first published in October 2008, having been supported by a $1 million campaign. The first printing of the ESVSB, consisting of 100,000 copies, sold out prior to completion. Within the first six months of availability, 300,000 copies had been printed in total. The ESVSB eventually went on to sell over 1 million copies.

=== Critical response ===
Andy Naselli, writing in the Journal of the Evangelical Theological Society, praised the ESV Study Bible:

An impressive list of evangelical pastors and teachers enthusiastically endorse the ESVSB, but the main reason it is so popular is its outstanding quality. ... No other study Bible matches the ESVSB in quantity or quality. ... It is difficult to think of a better comprehensive tool that benefits non-Christians, young Christians, and mature Christians.

=== Awards ===
In 2009, the Evangelical Christian Publishers Association named the ESV Study Bible as Christian Book of the Year. This was the first time in the award's 30-year history to be given to a study Bible. In the same year, World named the ESV Study Bible as Book of the Year.

== Use in other languages ==
=== Chinese Study Bible ===
The Chinese Study Bible (CSB) is a study Bible edition adapted from the study notes found in the ESV Study Bible. The CSB uses the Chinese Union Version with New Punctuation (CUVNP) for its Bible text. The CSB sold more than 6,500 copies on its first day of publication.

In 2012, the United Bible Societies (UBS) arranged for Fu Xianwei, chairman of the Three-Self Patriotic Movement, to visit Crossway. After seeing the content and presentation of the ESV Study Bible, Xianwei sought to publish a Chinese edition. In 2017, the British and Foreign Bible Society, in collaboration with Crossway, published the Chinese Study Bible. Led by UBS Global Translation Adviser Simon Wong, "a team of local reviewers, who included seminary lecturers and experienced pastors, was formed to rigorously review and adapt the content for a Chinese readership." Wong served as chief editor of the project. In 2022, Crossway published a hardback edition of the CSB.

As of 2023, the CSB is the only study Bible available in China. In 2022, Wong stated, "If we had started the Study Bible project two years later, I don’t know if it would ever be finished ... The situation in mainland China has progressively tightened, especially in the past two to three years."
