= Vern Poythress =

American theologian

- Born: March 29, 1946 (age 80); Madera, California, United States
- Occupation: Theologian
- Spouse: Diane (m. 1983)
- Children: 2 sons

Academic background
- Education: California Institute of Technology (B.S); Harvard University (Ph.D); Westminster Theological Seminary (M.Div, Th.M); University of Cambridge (M.Litt); University of Stellenbosch (Th.D)
- Alma mater: Harvard University (Mathematics), University of Stellenbosch (New Testament)
- Theses: Partial Algebras (Mathematics) (1970); Structural Approaches to Understanding the Theology of the Apostle Paul (New Testament) (1981)
- Doctoral advisor: Garrett Birkhoff (Mathematics), J.L. de Villiers (New Testament)

Academic work
- Era: Contemporary
- School or tradition: Calvinist, Van Tillian presuppositionalist
- Main interests: Philosophy of science, philosophy of mathematics, linguistics, hermeneutics, New Testament
- Notable ideas: Multiperspectivalism, scientific law as a form of the word of God, foundation for ontology and epistemology in the Trinity

Religious life
- Religion: Christianity
- Denomination: Presbyterian
- Church: Presbyterian Church in America
- Profession: Teaching Elder

Vernon Sheridan Poythress (born March 29, 1946) is an American New Testament scholar, Reformed theologian, and polymath. Specializing in philosophy and mathematics, Poythress currently serves as New Testament Chair for the English Standard Version translation committee. He is Distinguished Professor of New Testament, Biblical Interpretation, and Systematic Theology at Westminster Theological Seminary. In addition, he is the editor of the Westminster Theological Journal.

== Biography ==
Poythress was born in Madera, California in 1946 to Ransom H. Poythress and Carola N. Poythress. He graduated from Bullard High School in Fresno, California.

At the age of 20, Poythress earned a BS in mathematics with honor (valedictorian) from California Institute of Technology, in the year 1966. While there, he became a Putnam Fellow in 1964. He received his Ph.D. in mathematics from Harvard University, finishing in 1970. Westminster Theological Seminary awarded him both an M.Div and a Th.M in apologetics for work done in the years 1971-74. He earned an M.Litt from the University of Cambridge in New Testament studies during 1974-1976. He received a ThD in New Testament from the University of Stellenbosch.

In 1983, Poythress married Diane M. Poythress. They have two sons, Ransom Poythress and Justin Poythress.

As of 2016, he was teaching New Testament and occasional courses on the philosophies of science and language at Westminster Theological Seminary in Philadelphia, work he began in 1976. His blog with John M. Frame was listed in early 2018 as one of the top 50 Christian popular culture sites.

== Thought ==
Poythress views scientific law as a form of the word of God. In 1976, Poythress wrote a chapter on "A Biblical View of Mathematics," in which he argued (among other things) that number is eternal because the Trinity is eternal. In a 1983 article, he suggested that mathematics is the rhyme of the universe. His philosophy of science draws on the work of Thomas Kuhn.

== Publications ==
Poythress has published a number of books in different fields — Christian philosophy of science, linguistics, theological method, dispensationalism, biblical law, copyright law, hermeneutics, Bible translation, and eschatology and the Book of Revelation including:

- Philosophy, Science, and the Sovereignty of God. Presbyterian and Reformed: 1976, reprinted 2004. ISBN 978-1-59638-002-8.
- Symphonic Theology: The Validity of Multiple Perspectives in Theology. Zondervan: 1987. ISBN 978-0-87552-517-4.
- Understanding Dispensationalists. 2d ed. Presbyterian and Reformed: 1993. ISBN 978-0-87552-374-3.
- Science and Hermeneutics: Implications of Scientific Method for Biblical Interpretation (Foundations of Contemporary Interpretation series, volume 6). Zondervan: 1988. ISBN 978-0-310-40971-7.
- The Shadow of Christ in the Law of Moses, Wolgemuth & Hyatt: 1991, reprinted Presbyterian & Reformed: 1995. ISBN 978-0-87552-375-0.
- God-Centered Biblical Interpretation. Presbyterian and Reformed: 1999. ISBN 978-0-87552-376-7.
- The Returning King: A Guide to the Book of Revelation, Presbyterian and Reformed: 2000. ISBN 978-0-87552-462-7.
- The Gender-Neutral Bible Controversy: Muting the Masculinity of God's Words (with Wayne Grudem). Broadman and Holman: 2000. ISBN 978-0-8054-2441-6.
- The TNIV and the Gender-Neutral Bible Controversy (with Wayne Grudem). Broadman and Holman: 2004. ISBN 978-0-8054-3193-3.
- Redeeming Science: A God-Centered Approach. Crossway Books: 2006. ISBN 978-1-58134-731-9.
- In The Beginning Was The Word: Language--A God-Centered Approach. Crossway Books: 2009. ISBN 978-1-4335-0179-1.
- What Are Spiritual Gifts? (Basics of the Faith series). Presbyterian and Reformed, 2010. ISBN 978-1-59638-209-1.
- Redeeming Sociology: A God-Centered Approach. Crossway Books: 2011. ISBN 978-1-4335-2129-4.
- Inerrancy and Worldview: Answering Modern Challenges to the Bible. Crossway Books: 2012. ISBN 978-1-4335-2387-8.
- Inerrancy and the Gospels: A God-Centered Approach to the Challenges of Harmonization. Crossway Books: 2012. ISBN 978-1-4335-2860-6.
- Logic: A God-Centered Approach to the Foundation of Western Thought. Crossway Books: 2013. ISBN 978-1-4335-3229-0.
- Redeeming Mathematics: A God-Centered Approach. Crossway Books: 2015. ISBN 978-1-4335-4110-0.
- The Lordship of Christ: Serving Our Savior All of the Time, in All of Life, with All Our Heart. Crossway Books: 2016.
- The Miracles of Jesus: How the Savior’s Mighty Acts Serve as Signs of Redemption. Crossway Books: 2016.
- Reading the Word of God in the Presence of God: A Handbook for Biblical Interpretation. Crossway Books: 2016.
- Knowing and the Trinity: How Perspectives in Human Knowledge Imitate the Trinity. P&R: 2018.
- Theophany: A Biblical Theology of God’s Appearing. Crossway Books: 2018.
- Interpreting Eden: A Guide to Faithfully Reading and Understanding Genesis 1-3. Crossway Books: 2019.
- Redeeming Our Thinking about History: A God-Centered Approach. Crossway Books: 2022.
- Redeeming Reason: A God-Centered Approach. Crossway Books: 2023.
- Making Sense of the World: How the Trinity Helps to Explain Reality. P&R: 2024).

Additionally, he has published a number of scholarly articles, including:

- North, Gary, ed. (1976). "A Biblical View of Mathematics". Foundations of Christian Scholarship. Vallecito, CA: Ross House. pp. 159–188.
- "Structuralism and Biblical Studies". Journal of the Evangelical Theological Society. 21. 1978.
- "Science as Allegory". Journal of the American Scientific Affiliation. 35. 1983.
- "Newton's Laws as Allegory". Journal of the American Scientific Affiliation. 35. 1983.
- "Mathematics as Rhyme". Journal of the American Scientific Affiliation. 35. 1983.
- "The Use of the Intersentence Conjunctions De, Oun, Kai, and Asyndeton in the Gospel of John". Novum Testamentum. 26. 1984.
- "Reforming Ontology and Logic in the Light of the Trinity: An Application of Van Til's Idea of Analogy". Westminster Theological Journal. 57. 1995.
- "2 Thessalonians 1 Supports Amillennialism". Journal of the Evangelical Theological Society. 37. 1995.
- "Counterfeiting in the Book of Revelation as a Perspective on Non-Christian Culture". Journal of the Evangelical Theological Society. 40. 1997.
- "Keep on Praying!". Decision. 39 (10). 1998.
- "Why Scientists Must Believe in God: Divine Attributes of Scientific Law". Journal of the Evangelical Theological Society. 46. 2003.
