= Bruce A. Ware =

American theologian and academic

- Born: September 30, 1953 (age 73)
- Occupations: T. Rupert and Lucille Coleman Professor of Christian Theology at the Southern Baptist Theological Seminary

Academic background
- Education: Whitworth College, Western Conservative Baptist Seminary, University of Washington
- Alma mater: Fuller Theological Seminary (Ph.D.)
- Thesis: An Evangelical Reexamination of the Doctrine of the Immutability of God (1984)

Academic work
- Discipline: Systematic Theology; Doctrine of God; Trinity
- School or tradition: Evangelicalism; Reformed Theology; Cessationism; Progressive Dispensationalism
- Institutions: Bethel Theological Seminary; Western Seminary; Trinity Evangelical Divinity School; Southern Baptist Theological Seminary
- Main interests: Open Theism; Theology Proper; Trinity
- Notable works: Their God is Too Small: Open Theism and the Undermining of Confidence in God

Bruce A. Ware (born September 30, 1953) is an American theologian, former president of the Evangelical Theological Society, and a key figure in the debate over open theism.

== Education ==
- A.S. (1973) Judson Baptist College
- Certif. (1974) Capernwray Bible School
- B.A. (1975) Whitworth College
- M.Div. (1978) and Th.M. (1980) Western Conservative Baptist Seminary
- M.A. (1981) University of Washington
- Ph.D. (1984) Fuller Theological Seminary

== Career ==
- Bethel Theological Seminary (1984 - 1987)
- Western Seminary
- Associate Professor and Chairman of the Department of Biblical and Systematic Theology at Trinity Evangelical Divinity School
- Professor of Christian Theology at the Southern Baptist Theological Seminary (1998–present)

== Works ==
=== Books ===
- Ware, Bruce A.; Schreiner, Thomas R. (1995). Still Sovereign: Contemporary Perspectives on Election, Foreknowledge, and Grace. Grand Rapids, MI: Baker Books. ISBN 9780801022326. OCLC 53288151.
- ——— (2000). God's Lesser Glory: The Diminished God of Open Theism. Wheaton, IL: Crossway Books. ISBN 9781581342291. OCLC 44775399.
- ——— (2003). Their God is Too Small: Open Theism and the Undermining of Confidence in God. Wheaton, IL: Crossway Books. ISBN 9781581344813. OCLC 52057699.
- ——— (2004). God's Greater Glory: The Exalted God of Scripture and the Christian Faith. Wheaton, IL: Crossway Books. ISBN 9781581344431. OCLC 56334001.
- ——— (2004). Father, Son, and Holy Spirit: Relationships, Roles, and Relevance. Wheaton, IL: Crossway Books. ISBN 9781581346688. OCLC 56825509.
- Serving God with Determined Faith: Studies in the Book of Nehemiah (2005)
- ——— (2009). Big Truths for Young Hearts. Wheaton, IL: Crossway Books. ISBN 9781433523144. OCLC 769341433.
- ——— (2012). The Man Jesus Christ: Theological Reflections on the Humanity of Christ. Wheaton, IL: Crossway Books. ISBN 9781433524165. OCLC 818819635.

=== As editor ===
- ———; Schreiner, Thomas R., eds. (1995). The Grace of God, the Bondage of the Will. Grand Rapids, MI: Baker Books. ISBN 9780801020025. OCLC 33079725.
- ———, ed. (2007). Perspectives on the Doctrine of God: 4 Views. Nashville, TN: B&H Academic. ISBN 9780805430608. OCLC 156832175.

=== Articles and chapters ===
- ——— (Summer 2000). "Despair amidst suffering and pain: a practical outworking of open theism's diminished view of God". Southern Baptist Journal of Theology. 4 (2): 56–75.
- ——— (Spring 2001). "Tampering With the Trinity: Does the Son Submit to His Father?". Journal for Biblical Manhood and Womanhood. 6 (1): 4–12.
- ——— (June 2002). "Defining Evangelicalism's Boundaries Theologically: Is Open Theism Evangelical?". Journal of the Evangelical Theological Society. 45 (2): 193–212.
- ——— (June 2002). "Rejoinder to Replies by Clark H. Pinnock, John Sanders, and Gregory A. Boyd". Journal of the Evangelical Theological Society. 45 (2): 245–256.
- ——— (2006). "Divine election to salvation". In Brand, Chad Owen (ed.). Perspectives on Election: five views. Nashville, TN: Broadman & Holman Publishers. ISBN 9780805427295. OCLC 73275402.
- ——— (Spring 2006). "Cur Deus Trinus? The Relation of the Trinity to Christ's Identity as Savior and to the Efficacy of his Atoning Death". Southern Baptist Journal of Theology. 10 (1): 48–56.
- "Unity and Distinction of the Trinitarian Persons." In Whtifield, Keith S. (ed.) Trinitarian Theology: Theological Models and Doctrinal Application. Nashville, TN: B&H Academic. 2018. pp. 17–62. ISBN 978-1535958066
