= Thomas R. Schreiner =

American New Testament scholar (born 1954)

Thomas Schreiner
- Born: 24 April 1954 (age 72)
- Occupation: James Buchanan Harrison Professor of New Testament Interpretation at the Southern Baptist Theological Seminary

Academic background
- Education: Western Oregon University, Western Seminary, Fuller Theological Seminary
- Alma mater: Fuller Theological Seminary (PhD)
- Doctoral advisor: Donald A. Hagner

Academic work
- Discipline: New Testament studies
- Sub-discipline: Pauline scholar
- Institutions: Bethel Theological Seminary; Azusa Pacific University; Southern Baptist Theological Seminary
- Main interests: Pauline theologies, biblical theology
- Notable works: Commentaries: Romans (BECNT); Galatians (ZECNT); Revelation (BECNT); 1-2 Peter & Jude (CSC); 1 and 2 Peter, Jude (NAC); Hebrews (EBTC); Hebrews (BTCP); 1 Corinthians (TNTC)

Thomas R. Schreiner (born April 24, 1954) is an American Reformed Baptist scholar, specializing in New Testament and Pauline studies. He is the James Buchanan Harrison Professor of New Testament Interpretation at the Southern Baptist Theological Seminary. He previously taught at Bethel University and Azusa Pacific University. He is also co-chairman of the Christian Standard Bible's Translation Oversight Committee and is the New Testament editor of the ESV Study Bible. Schreiner has degrees from Western Oregon University, Western Seminary, and Fuller Theological Seminary.

Schreiner has written commentaries on Romans, Galatians, Hebrews, First, Second Peter, and Jude, and Revelation. In 2014, he served as president of the Evangelical Theological Society.

From 2001 to 2015, Schreiner served as the Pastor of Preaching at Clifton Baptist Church in Louisville, Kentucky. He currently serves as an elder at Clifton. His son, Patrick, is also a New Testament scholar, teaching at Midwestern Baptist Theological Seminary.

In 2019, a Festschrift was published in his honor. God’s Glory Revealed in Christ: Essays on Biblical Theology in Honor of Thomas R. Schreiner included contributions from Clinton E. Arnold, D. A. Carson, Simon Gathercole, Russell D. Moore, John Piper, and Bruce Ware.

== Works ==
=== Books ===
- Schreiner, Thomas R. (1990). Interpreting the Pauline Epistles. Guides to New Testament Exegesis. Vol. 5. Grand Rapids, MI: Baker Book House. ISBN 9780801083020. OCLC 22760550.
- ——— (1998). The Law and Its Fulfillment: A Pauline Theology of Law. Grand Rapids, MI: Baker Books. ISBN 9780801083532. OCLC 27896883.
- ——— (1998). Romans. Baker Exegetical Commentary on the New Testament (BECNT). Vol. 6. Grand Rapids, MI: Baker Academic. ISBN 9780801021497. OCLC 38936659.
- ———; Ware, Bruce A. (1995). Still Sovereign: Contemporary Perspectives on Election, Foreknowledge, and Grace. Grand Rapids, MI: Baker Books. ISBN 9780801022326. OCLC 53288151.
- ———; Caneday, Ardel B (2001). The Race Set Before Us: A Biblical Theology of Perseverance and Assurance. Downers Grove, IL: InterVarsity Press. ISBN 9780830815555. OCLC 45667863.
- ——— (2001). Paul Apostle of God's Glory in Christ: A Pauline. Downers Grove, IL: InterVarsity Press. ISBN 9780830826513. OCLC 46918396.
- ——— (2003). 1 and 2 Peter, Jude. New American Commentary (NAC). Vol. 37. Holman Bible Publishers. ISBN 9780805401370. OCLC 53094492.
- ——— (2008). New Testament Theology: Magnifying God in Christ. Grand Rapids, MI: Baker Academic. ISBN 9780801026805. OCLC 166368580.
- ——— (2010). Galatians. Zondervan Exegetical Commentary on the New Testament. Vol. 9. Grand Rapids, MI: Zondervan. ISBN 9780310243724. OCLC 613993871.
- ——— (2010). Magnifying God in Christ: A Summary of New Testament Theology. Grand Rapids, MI: Baker Academic. ISBN 9780801038266. OCLC 424557803.
- ——— (2011). Interpreting the Pauline Epistles (2nd ed.). Grand Rapids, MI: Baker Academic. ISBN 9780801038129. OCLC 669269859.
- ——— (2013). The King in His Beauty: A Biblical Theology of the Old and New Testaments. Grand Rapids, MI: Baker Academic. ISBN 9780801039393. OCLC 813287457.
- ——— (2015). Faith Alone: The Doctrine of Justification. The 5 Solas Series. Grand Rapids, MI: Zondervan. ISBN 9780310515784. OCLC 908553219.
- ——— (2015). Hebrews. Biblical Theology for Christian Proclamation (BTCP). Nashville, TN: B&H Publishing Group. ISBN 9780805496130. OCLC 902701938.
- ——— (2018). 1 Corinthians. Tyndale New Testament Commentaries (TNTC). Downers Grove, IL: IVP Academic.
- ——— (2021). Hebrews. Evangelical Biblical Theology Commentary (EBTC). Bellingham, WA: Lexham Press. ISBN 9781683594307. OCLC 1136957833.
- ——— (2023). Revelation. Baker Exegetical Commentary on the New Testament (BECNT). Grand Rapids, MI: Baker Academic. ISBN 9781540960504. OCLC 1346215162.

=== As editor ===
- ———; Köstenberger, Andreas J.; Baldwin, H. Scott, eds. (1995). Women in the Church: A Fresh Analysis of 1 Timothy 2:9-15. Grand Rapids, MI: Baker Academic. ISBN 9780801020209. OCLC 33079018.
- ———; Ware, Bruce A., eds. (1995). The Grace of God, the Bondage of the Will. Grand Rapids, MI: Baker Books. ISBN 9780801020025. OCLC 33079725.
- ———; Köstenberger, Andreas J.; Baldwin, H. Scott, eds. (2005). Women in the Church: an analysis and application of 1 Timothy 2:9-15. Grand Rapids, MI: Baker Academic. ISBN 9780801029042. OCLC 58985983. - new edition of the 1995 title
- ———; Wright, Shawn, eds. (2006). Believer's Baptism: Sign of the New Covenant in Christ. NAC Studies in Bible & Theology (NACSBT). Nashville, TN: B&H Academic. ISBN 9780805432497. OCLC 82136025.
- ———; Crawford, Matthew R., eds. (2010). The Lord's Supper: Remembering and Proclaiming Christ until He Comes. NAC Studies in Bible & Theology (NACSBT). B&H Academic. ISBN 9780805447576.

=== Articles and chapters ===
- ——— (Autumn 2010). "Another Look at the New Perspective". Southern Baptist Journal of Theology. 14 (3): 4–18.
- ——— (Spring 2011). "Sermon: From Adam to Christ: The Grace that Conquers all our Sin (Romans 5:12-19)". Southern Baptist Journal of Theology. 15 (1): 80–90.
- ——— (Spring 2012). "The Centrality of God in New Testament Theology". Southern Baptist Journal of Theology. 16 (1): 4–17.
- ——— (Fall 2015). "Sermon: A Building from God - 2 Corinthians 5:1-10". Southern Baptist Journal of Theology. 19 (3): 121–129.
- ——— (Winter 2015). "Justification by Works and Sola Fide". Southern Baptist Journal of Theology. 19 (4): 39–58.
