= Crossway =

American Christian publishing company

- Founded: 1938 (Note: Good News Publishers, Crossway's parent ministry, began this year.); 1978
- Founder: Clyde and Muriel Dennis (Note: Good News Publishers started as a tract-based ministry in the late 1930s during the Great Depression.); Lane and Ebeth Dennis
- Country of origin: United States
- Headquarters location: Wheaton, Illinois
- Key people: Josh Dennis (President and CEO)
- Publication types: Christian books, ESV Bibles, tracts
- Official website: www.crossway.org

Crossway (previously known by its parent ministry Good News Publishers) is an American not-for-profit evangelical Christian publishing ministry headquartered in Wheaton, Illinois. Clyde and Muriel Dennis founded Good News Publishers in 1938, working out of their home in Minneapolis, Minnesota.

Crossway is best known for publishing the English Standard Version (ESV) Bible, along with evangelical Christian books. It claims to have distributed more than 290 million ESV Bibles and 1 billion tracts.

== Crossway ==
In late 1978, Good News Publishers began expanding its reach by establishing Crossway, a publishing division. Beginning under the leadership of Lane T. Dennis (Clyde and Muriel's son), and since 2021, Josh Dennis (his son), Crossway claims that it has published more than 1,500 titles, including books "by Francis A. Schaeffer, Martyn Lloyd-Jones, John Piper, John MacArthur, Paul David Tripp, Jen Wilkin, J. I. Packer, Chuck Colson, Frank Peretti, Max Lucado, Joni Eareckson Tada, and D. A. Carson."

In 2012, Good News Publishers and the American Tract Society entered into a joint publishing agreement regarding publication and distribution of gospel tracts throughout North America.

== ESV Bible translation ==
In 2001, Crossway published the ESV translation of the Bible. The ESV translation committee describes the ESV as a translation that is "essentially literal", following a "word-for-word" philosophy.

According to Crossway, the publishing team behind the ESV "has included more than a hundred people."

In 2008, Crossway published the ESV Study Bible.

In 2016, Crossway made headlines after announcing that the ESV text would be "unchanged forever, in perpetuity" as a "permanent text" edition, following a change of 29 verses. After public discourse about the policy, Crossway announced that it would reverse the decision.
