= E. Graham Howe =

British psychiatrist (1897–1975)

- Howe in 1937
- Born: Eric Graham Howe; 3 February 1897; London, England
- Died: 8 July 1975 (aged 78)
- Education: St Thomas's Hospital Medical School (MBBS, DPM)
- Known for: Eastern philosophy and psychotherapy
- Medical career
- Institutions: Bethlem Royal Hospital; Tavistock Clinic; St Thomas' Hospital; West Herts Hospital

Eric Graham Howe (3 February 1897 – 8 July 1975) was a British psychiatrist notable for his early, interdisciplinary approach to psychotherapy in the 1930s, featuring elements of psychodynamic psychology, existential phenomenology, Eastern philosophy and Christian spirituality. After serving in World War I, he became interested in Sigmund Freud and decided to study psychiatry. Following medical school, he worked at the Tavistock Clinic in the 1920s and 1930s, and established the Open Way Clinic in the 1950s, later renamed the Langham Clinic. Towards the end of his life, he was known as a practicing Druid. He was the author of more than a dozen books, and was influential among writers and psychiatrists including Israel Regardie, Jean Lucey Pratt, Alan Watts, Henry Miller, and R.D. Laing.

== Early life and education ==
Eric Graham Howe was born in London on February 3, 1897, the twelfth child of his father John Foster Howe and his mother Caroline. Of his eleven other siblings, he had only one sister, Dora. Four of his brothers died before he was born while two more died later in World War I. His unpublished autobiography, The Autobiography of an Unwanted Man, details much of his early life. As a child, he had fond memories of the family dog and of "Clara", a sickly, adopted girl he referred to as his auntie. Clara was likely an orphan taken in as a promise by his family to a dying member of their church. Howe planned on receiving a scholarship to study mathematics when he came down with scarlet fever which ended his educational goals. Instead of school, he began working for an accounting firm at the age of 14.

Britain was plunged into World War I in July 1914, leading Howe to lie about his age to join the army at the early age of 17.5. He enlisted in the Artists Rifles regiment of the British Army Reserve, where he served for the next six years. After the first six months, he became a commissioned officer in India, reaching the rank of Major in just a few years. By the end of the war, he was deployed to Vladivostok as part of the Siberian intervention during the revolution, where he learned the language. He returned home in 1920 and went to work for his brother in the shipping industry for several years. At some point he read the Collected Papers of Sigmund Freud (1924–1925), and decided to follow the same path as Freud. Although he never completed secondary school, he convinced the dean of St Thomas' Hospital to admit him conditional upon passing several exams. Howe received his Bachelor of Medicine, Bachelor of Surgery and a degree in medical psychology at St Thomas's Hospital Medical School (University of London) in 1927.

== Career ==
After a residency at Bethlem Royal Hospital and Bowden House Clinic, Howe became an early founding member of the Tavistock Clinic (1926–1935) where he was also an instructor. Howe was a supporter of the work of Carl Jung (1875–1961). In 1935, Jung was invited by the Institute of Medical Psychology to give a lecture series at the clinic, which became known as the "London Seminars" or the "Tavistock Lectures". During the series, which occurred on five separate days from 30 September to 4 October, Howe and Jung got into a lively debate about the nature of intuition and other topics. After leaving Tavistock, Howe later established the Open Way Clinic (1953) in a centralized area of the West End. The clinic was adjacent to the Royal Society of Medicine and its community of psychoanalysts, and Harley Street, known for its private specialists. This location enabled the development of an intellectual social network, where professionals from various therapeutic communities gathered to exchange ideas.

Open Way was known to employ novel techniques including art and music therapies. In contrast, conventional biomedical psychiatry at the time treated patients with various forms of shock therapies, including insulin coma therapy, electroshocks, and other treatments, such as the lobotomy. Open Way later changed its name to the Langham Clinic, a psychotherapy treatment center featuring lectures, training, and workshops for therapists and analysts, and low-cost therapy sessions for patients. Notable participants included psychotherapists John Heaton, Joseph Berke, and Leon Redler, among others. Howe was a mentor to R. D. Laing (1927–1989), who became clinical director of Open Way in 1962. As the counterculture of the 1960s progressed, Howe disagreed with Laing's use of LSD in psychedelic therapy and had him removed from the Langham Clinic in 1965. Cooper et al. of the Philadelphia Association summarize Howe's position: "Although Laing did not take up the view that psychedelics should be used in psychiatry, Howe believed LSD could be dangerous, even a cheap con, and that Laing's interest in it was misplaced." The psychologist Ian C. Edwards believes that Howe's opinion of psychedelics was informed by Jiddu Krishnamurti's strict, anti-psychedelic drug position, (Note: See for example, Krishnamurti, Jiddu; Lutyens, Mary (Ed.) (1970). The Only Revolution. New York: Harper & Row. OCLC 93701.) which viewed drugs as only making people comfortable, not truly free.

== Work ==
Howe's early work, Motives and Mechanisms of the Mind (1931), is based on a series of lectures he delivered the previous year. The material is derived from patient case studies and clinical work Howe performed at the Tavistock Square Clinic and St. Thomas's Hospital. The book is unusual for its time as an academic publication as it deliberately avoids citing sources or using footnotes and only contains an index for reference. Howe's ideas are rooted in psychodynamic psychology and informed by the theories of Freud, Alfred Adler, and Jung, but his style is classified as existentialist and phenomenological. The book was later serialized by The Lancet. According to Ian C. Edwards, it is a significant work for Howe, as it shows him attempting to describe psychoanalytic theory while also pursuing nontraditional methods for treating psychological disorders.

Morality and Reality (1934), a book about parenting, was originally given as a series of five lectures in 1934 to the Home and School Council of Great Britain. It was later rewritten and republished in several revised editions (1935, 1938) with the title Time and the Child. In the book, Howe identifies as a medical psychologist, not as a philosopher, while discussing the limits of descriptive science, but also upholding its necessity. "Of all the sciences," writes Howe, "That of psychology stands most in danger of being imprisoned within the artificial boundaries of its own conventional moralities. The phenomena of mind are as large as life, and it is much to expect of any science that it should be big enough to include all life within its scope." The book was well received by reviewer M. Hamblin Smith in the Journal of Mental Science and in the Postgraduate Medical Journal.

Where this War Hits You: Four Broadcast Talks (1941) was originally broadcast by the BBC during World War II as a series of four episodes: "Cross Purposes", "Create and Share", "How Long", and "The Great Unseen". After it was compiled into a book, it was reviewed favorably. J. Kruisheer found "How Long" to be the best in the series. Focusing on the philosophy of time, "How Long" reiterates the popular notion of the "Eternal Now", a kind of timelessness where past, present, and future are all contained in the present moment. Helen Liddell notes that Howe's themes of creativity and democracy in the book share the same sentiments in similar works by Peter Drucker and Julian Huxley.

Victor White, an English Dominican priest and collaborator with Jung, reviewed Howe's The Triumphant Spirit. A Study of Depression (1944) for the theological journal Blackfriars, criticizing it as a form of pseudo-psychology that deviated from Jung's ideas. Quotes about Buddhism from Howe in his book Invisible Anatomy (1944) were later incorporated into Theravada Buddhist outreach literature. (Note: See for example, Dhammanandai, K. Sri (2023). Buddhism in the Eyes of Intellectuals. The Singapore Buddhist Meditation Center. p. 30.) In the late 1940s, Anglican theologian J. Stafford Wright characterized Howe as a Buddhist in The Churchman, but Howe took issue with this description and denied it, leading Frank Colquhoun to issue a retraction. In the 1950s, Howe lectured at the Buddhist Society and was acquainted with Sri Lankan Theravada Buddhist Nyanaponika Thera. Howe wrote the forward to the first English language edition of Thera's book The Heart of Buddhist Meditation (1956). According to Christmas Humphreys, Howe was partially responsible for bringing Edward Conze to Buddhism. Howe's book, Cure or Heal? (1965), focused on Hindu philosophy and the use of Chakra psychology and its potential applications in psychotherapy and psychosomatic medicine. Richard W. Crocket positively reviewed the book for the British Journal of Psychiatry.

== Later life ==
In his later years, Howe was known for his practice of modern Druidry, and was said to conduct ceremonies in his barn at his property in Wales. In the early 1970s, he wrote The Mind of a Druid (1973), just a few years before he died, with Henry Miller's "The Wisdom of the Heart" as a preface. The work reached a wider audience with its posthumous publication by Skoob in 1989, adding a new foreword by David Loxley of The Druid Order.

== Personal life ==
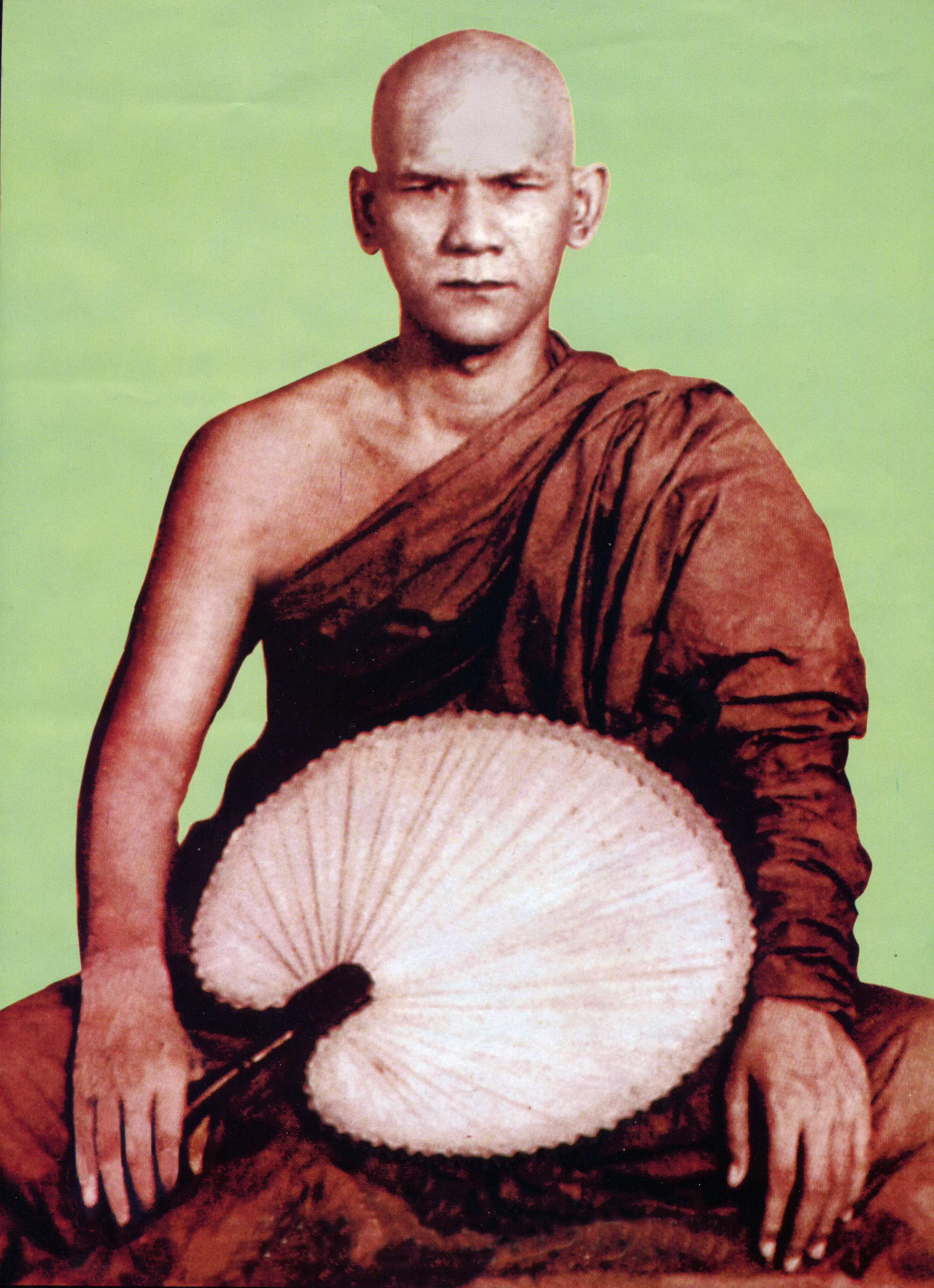
Mahasi Sayadaw taught Howe meditation.

In March 1927, Howe married Nora H. Blaxill. Nora gave birth to two sons that died in early childhood and two daughters, Gillian and Carolyn. The family also adopted a son who later died while flying as a test pilot for the RAF during WWII. Howe and Nora were a poor fit as a couple and they eventually divorced in the early 1950s. With the marriage over, Howe closed his practice and left the country to study meditation for three months in Ceylon (now Sri Lanka), Burma (now Myanmar), and northern India. He received instruction in meditation practices from Nyanaponika Thera, Mahasi Sayadaw, and Sivananda Saraswati, among others.

When Howe returned home, he soon remarried. He would remain with Doris, his second wife, until the end of his life. Together, they ran Open Way as a couple and attracted a diverse number of experts to study, what Howe called, the "spiritual nature of man". Howe's interest in eclectic subjects outside his original field led to a mixed reputation among his former colleagues, with some declaring he had gone "mad", while still others refused to appear at the same events with him. By the 1970s, his health began to decline and a blood clot led to the loss of one leg. Pursuing his keen interest in Druidry, Howe and his wife moved to Bala, Gwynedd, Wales, for a time, before finally moving back to London. Howe died on July 8, 1975, just one day after completing his last work, Consciousness: A Western Treatment of Tibetan Yoga.

== Influence ==
The occult nonfiction writer Israel Regardie (1907–1985) became friends with Howe in 1932, after an editor for the Saturday Review gave Regardie's second book, The Tree of Life: A Study in Magic (1932), a hostile, poor review. Howe responded to the bad review in the newspaper with his own positive, glowing review of Regardie's book, defending him and promoting the book. Gerald Suster believes this relationship led Regardie to pursue his study of psychology in the 1930s. Both Regardie and Howe became initiates of the Stella Matutina Hermes Temple in Bristol. In an unusual turn of events, Regardie would later become a critic of Howe's nephew, Ellic Howe, who made a career of publishing books about the Golden Dawn that Regardie felt were "anti-magic". Suster also notes that Gerard Noel, the co-founder of the Witchcraft Research Association, was an admirer of Howe, saying that "Everything I am today, I owe to him".

Jean Lucey Pratt (1909–1986), famous for her Mass-Observation diaries, was a patient of Howe's during this time, becoming interested in his work after reading I and Me: A Study of the Self (1935). She wrote about him throughout her diary and continued to see Howe as an analyst for several decades.

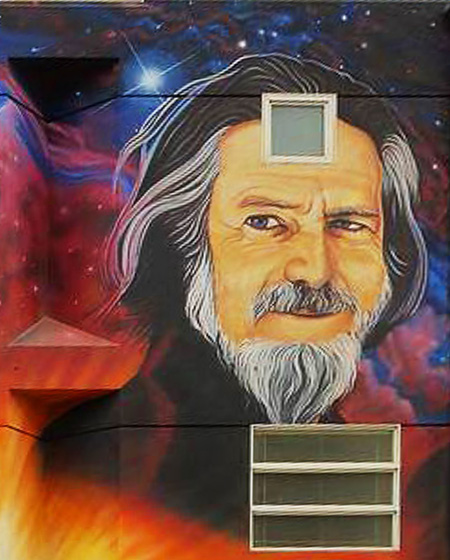
Mural of Alan Watts, Los Angeles

The writer Alan Watts (1915–1973), while attending The King's School, Canterbury in the late 1920s, decided upon modern history as his specialty, planning for a scholarship to Trinity College, Oxford. He soon lost interest in modern history and began pursuing Eastern philosophy instead; his scholarship essay for Oxford was denied. Watt's family did not have the money to send him to college. Determined to continue his self-education, he sought out teachers on his own. Watts pursued Howe to learn more, and although Watts was not a patient of Howe's, from 1936 to 1938, Howe was his self-appointed tutor in psychology. Watts described him as a "genial, dignified, and reassuring doctor". He met with Howe for lunches and attended his weekly discussion groups, along with astronomer Richard Gregory, psychologist Philip Metman, Prince Leopold Loewenstein, and Frederic Spiegelberg. Howe invited Jiddu Krishnamurti to speak to the group in 1936, which profoundly influenced Watts. Howe, along with Laing and Watts, were notable for their shared interest in the synthesis of Asian and Christian spirituality and practices.

The American writer Henry Miller (1891–1980), who was in Paris in 1939, read a copy of Howe's War Dance: A Study in the Psychology of War (1937). This so impressed Miller that he travelled to London to discuss it with Howe at his office. Miller published an essay about Howe's ideas titled "The Wisdom of the Heart", first publishing it in The Modern Mystic in April 1939, followed by its inclusion in The Fortune Anthology in 1940, and a book of essays by the same name in 1941. Miller's essay brought Howe renewed attention in the United States, but little interest was shown in publishing his work there.

== Legacy ==
Howe's refusal to join the British Psychoanalytical Society and his holistic, anti-systematic approach to his work seriously impacted his career and reputation. Writers like Eric Trist largely ignored him in historical works about the field, and psychiatry dismissed his work as unscientific. The historian Rhodri Hayward describes Howe as an "eclectic Freudian" and an "aristocratic theosophist and Honorary Physician" who "set up one of the first postgraduate psychotherapy courses for general practitioners" at Tavistock. Hayward notes that Howe was viewed at the time as an "eccentric...therapist who later defected to Buddhism and Druidism". The Philadelphia Association described Howe as a "distinctly original voice within psychotherapy and psychiatry". The writer Roberta Russell argues that Howe was uniquely responsible as the psychiatrist who "introduced Eastern philosophy to psychotherapy in England."

== Books ==
- Motives and Mechanisms of the Mind: An Introduction to Psychopathology and Applied Psychology (1931)
- Morality and Reality: An Essay on the Law of Life (1934)
  - Time and the Child (1935 Rev., 1938 Rev.)
- I and Me: A Study of the Self (1935)
- War Dance: A Study in the Psychology of War (1937)
- The Open Way: A Study in Acceptance (1939)
- Where this War Hits You: Four Broadcast Talks (1941)
- The Triumphant Spirit (1943)
- Invisible Anatomy: A Study of 'Nerves', Hysteria and Sex (1944)
- Mysterious Marriage: A Study of the Morality of Personal Relationships and Individual Obsessions (1949)
- A Psychologist at Work (1950)
- Cure or Heal? A Study of Therapeutic Experience (1965)
- The Mind of the Druid (1973)
- She and Me: A New Restatement of an Old Problem (1974)
- Consciousness: A Western Treatment of Tibetan Yoga (1975)
