= Churchman (journal) =

- Discipline: Theology
- Language: English
- Edited by: Gerald Bray

Publication details
- Former name: The Churchman
- History: 1879-present
- Publisher: Church Society (United Kingdom)
- Frequency: Quarterly

Standard abbreviations
- ISO 4: Churchman

Indexing
- ISSN: 0009-661X

Links
- Journal homepage

Churchman is an evangelical Anglican academic journal published by the Church Society. It was formerly known as The Churchman and started in 1880 as a monthly periodical before moving to quarterly publication in 1920. The name change to "Churchman" came in 1977. The editor-in-chief is Peter Jensen. In September 2020 the journal was renamed The Global Anglican.

Early editors included Walter Purton (1880–92), William McDonald Sinclair (1892–1901), Augustus Robert Buckland (1901–02), Henry Wace (1902–05), William Griffith Thomas (1905–10) and Guy Warman, jointly, from 1910 to 1914. Other editors include Frank Colquhoun and Gerald Bray.

Contributors to Churchman have included: J. C. Ryle, J. Stafford Wright, C. Sydney Carter, Geoffrey W. Bromiley, Philip Edgecumbe Hughes, Arthur Pollard, J. I. Packer, Alan Stibbs, John Stott, Roger Beckwith, J. A. Motyer, and Jane Marsh Parker. Among contributors have been Mary Strong, who in her introduction to "Letter of the Scattered Brotherhood" state she submitted and were published in The Churchman across a span of 14 years letters and writings from anonymous writings of genuine religious experience. These were later published in a collection: "Letters of the Scattered Brotherhood", 1948, New York, Harper & Row. The copyright continues.
