= Harry Becher =

Irish priest

Harry Becher was a long serving Irish Anglican priest, most notably Dean of Ross from 1919 to 1926.

The Head Master of St Paul's School, Stony Stratford, Becher was ordained deacon in 1883 and priest in 1884. After a curacy at Lislee he held incumbencies at Castlehaven and Rosscarbery.

Religious titles
| Preceded by John Halahan | Dean of Ross, Ireland; 1920-1926 | Succeeded by Charles Webster |
