= Hugh Persevall =

Hugh Persevall, Rector of Cork and Prebendary of Timoleague, was the Dean of Ross, Ireland from 1615 until his death in 1630.

Religious titles
Preceded by Robert Sturton	Dean of Ross, Ireland; 1615–1630	Succeeded by William Bolton
