= Church Society =

Anglican evangelical group

- Predecessor: Church Association; National Church League
- Formation: 1950
- Type: Evangelical Anglican charity
- Headquarters: Dean Wace House, Watford, England
- Key people: J. C. Ryle, William Griffith Thomas, Philip Edgcumbe Hughes, Gerald Bray, Wallace Benn
- Website: www.churchsociety.org

Church Society is a conservative, evangelical Anglican organisation and registered charity formed in 1950 by the merger of the Anglican Church Association (founded 1865) and National Church League (founded 1906 by amalgamation of two earlier bodies). In May 2018, Church Society merged with two other evangelical Anglican organisations, Reform and the Fellowship of Word and Spirit to provide a united voice for conservative evangelicals within the Church of England.

The journal of Church Society is The Global Anglican, formerly Churchman (established 1879). Editors have included Henry Wace, Philip Edgecumbe Hughes and Gerald Bray. The current editor is Peter Jensen.

Anglicans associated with the society include J. C. Ryle, J. T. Tomlinson, W. H. Griffith-Thomas, Henry Wace, William Joynson-Hicks (Home Secretary), Geoffrey Bromiley, Philip Edgecumbe Hughes, J. I. Packer, Alan Stibbs, John Stott, Alec Motyer, Wallace Benn, and Rod Thomas.

== History and predecessors ==
The original forebear of the Church Society was the Protestant Association (founded 1835). The forebears of the society were established in the 19th century to oppose the introduction of Anglo-Catholic doctrine into the Church of England through bodies such as the Oxford Movement and The Church Union.

Church Association 'Protestant Van' from a postcard dated March 1907

The Church Association, founded in 1865 by Richard P. Blakeney stated in its first annual report that the objectives of the Association were:

To uphold the principles and order of the United Church of England and Ireland, and to counteract the efforts now being made to assimilate her services to those of the Church of Rome.

As well as publishing information (including its Church Association Tracts and holding public meetings, controversially, this also involved instigating legal action against Anglo-Catholics. According to the Association this was intended to clarify the law. However, the ritualists refusal to comply with the courts' verdicts, coupled with the bishops' unwillingness to act, eventually led to such legal action not being pursued.

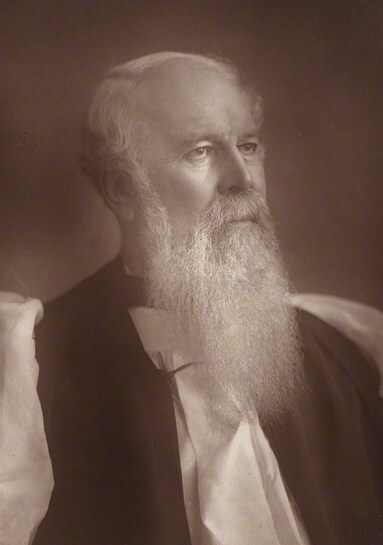
J. C. Ryle, first Bishop of Liverpool and Church Association Tract author and conference speaker

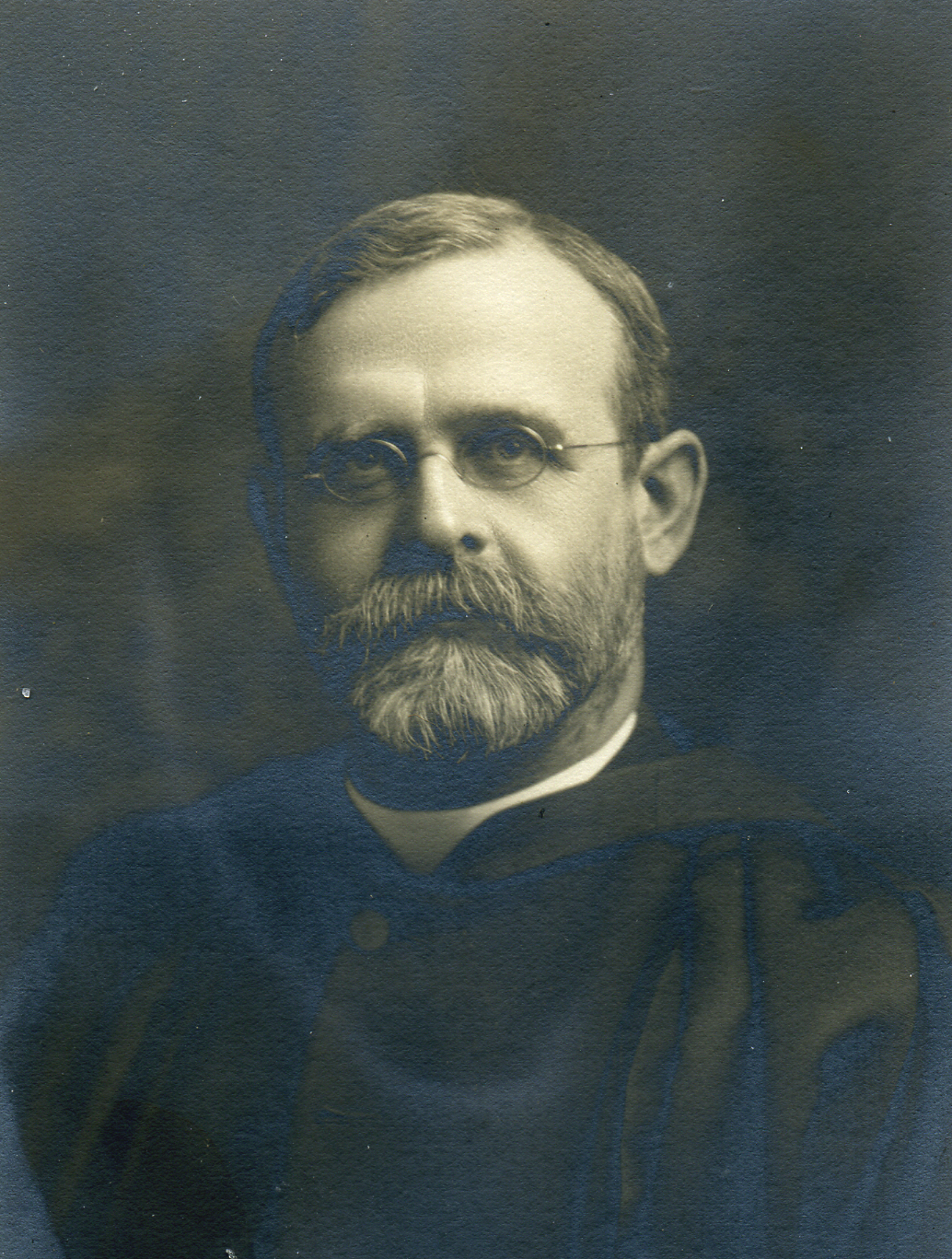
W. H. Griffith Thomas, author of The Principles of Theology, an exposition of the Thirty-Nine Articles

In 1928 the National Church League, led by its treasurer William Joynson-Hicks, was successful in Parliament, as home secretary, in resisting what were seen as attempted Anglo-Catholic doctrinal changes in the 1928 Book of Common Prayer.

The society (and its forebears) have published theological literature since the 19th century, including the Church Association Tracts (several of which were written by J. C. Ryle), and its journal, Churchman. Most of the society's 20th-century titles, including works by W. H. Griffith Thomas, (pictured right) were produced under its publishing arm, Church Book Room Press (CBRP), and from 1976, Vine Books Ltd.

In 1950 the Church Association and the National Church League merged to form Church Society.

At the AGM in 2018 a new council was elected to include leaders from Reform and the Fellowship of Word and Spirit, to work together to complete the agreed merger of the three organisations. The merged body continued to be known as Church Society.

== Present day ==
According to its website, Church Society is a fellowship contending to reform and renew the Church of England in biblical faith. These objectives are accomplished through campaigning, networking, patronage, publishing, conferences and partnership with other organisations, as well as the administration of charitable trusts and properties. According to its memorandum of association the main objective of Church Society is:

To maintain the doctrine and worship of the Church of England as set forth in the 39 Articles of Religion, and the Book of Common Prayer, as reviewed and adopted in 1662, and to uphold the supreme and exclusive sufficiency and authority of Holy Scripture as containing all things necessary for salvation.

The society's interpretation of its declared objectives include opposing homosexuality and the ordination of women.

=== Campaigning ===
The society issues occasional press releases on its views which its website says seek to present 'a clear biblical perspective on issues affecting both the Church of England and the nation.' The society has been active in opposing women's ordination as priests (it failed in its legal attempt to overturn the 1992 decision to ordain women) and consecration as bishops, which included in November 2012 setting up the campaign group Together 4ward.

It has also taken a position against the acceptance of actively homosexual lifestyles in the Church of England which led to it opposing the appointment of the former Archbishop of Canterbury, Rowan Williams, and also the appointment of Jeffrey John as Dean of St Albans. In 2012 the society, in conjunction with other organisations, campaigned against Government plans to implement same-sex marriage legislation. Since 2017 Church Society has also been opposed to the Church of England's Living in Love and Faith process.

The society has critiqued inter-denominational theological movements including theological liberalism and some aspects of the charismatic movement.

More positively, it was actively involved in requesting transparency in the John Symth case with regards the Archbishop of Canterbury, and in asking for more conservative-minded bishops to be consecrated in a way that better reflects the actual numbers of traditional evangelical churches and church members on the ground.

=== Patronage ===
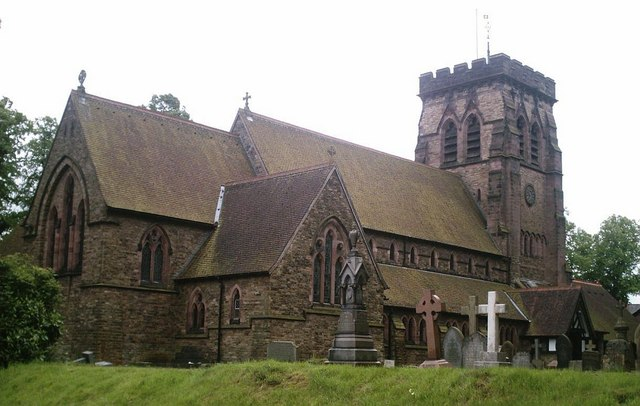
St John the Baptist, Hartford, Cheshire

Through its patronage body Church Society Trust (prior to 1950, Church Association Trust) the society is involved in the appointment of evangelical clergy in approximately 130 Anglican churches, including St John the Baptist, Hartford Cheshire (pictured), and Christ Church (Düsseldorf)

=== Publishing ===
The society today publishes its journal Global Anglican (formerly Churchman), edited by Peter Jensen; members' magazine Crossway;, and a number of books and booklets such as An English Prayer Book (a contemporary Anglican liturgy in the tradition of the Book of Common Prayer); and a range of books on contemporary evangelical Anglicanism, such as Fight Valiantly. In 2010 the society established the Reformed Evangelical Anglican Library (REAL) – a project to re-publish evangelical Anglican texts (including the sermons of George Whitefield, as well as producing a weekly podcast, and regular videos introducing the lectionary readings. Other audio-visual and downloadable resources produced by Church Society are also on their website.

=== Administration ===
The society administers a number of charitable trusts and properties.

The society holds an annual day conference, an annual residential conference (formerly the Fellowship of Word and Spirit conference), is a partner in the annual ReNew conference, and hosts the annual Junior Anglican Evangelical Conference. Church Society also runs an online training course for women, the Priscilla Programme in partnership with Union School of Theology, led by the associate director.

The society is run by an elected council and staff (voted for by its members annually). As of 2019 the president of the society was Bishop Roderick Thomas, and the director was Revd Dr Lee Gatiss. After previously being located in central London, the society's headquarters moved to Dean Wace House, Watford, UK.

== Leadership ==
=== Secretaries ===
- 1942–1949: Llewellyn Roberts (Nat. Church League)
- 1945–1952: Gordon Savage (Church Assoc. & Church Society)
- 1953–1956: Philip Hughes
- 1956–1962: Tom Hewitt
- 1962–1967: John Sertin
- 1967–1975: Michael Benson
- 1975–1982: Don Irving
- 1983–1991: David Samuel
- 1991–1998: David Streater

=== Directors ===
- 1998–2011: David Phillips
- 2013–: Lee Gatiss

From 2017 Church Society has also employed an associate director, Ros Clarke. In 2019, two part-time Regional Directors were appointed.

== See also ==
- Forward in Faith
