= Philip Edgcumbe Hughes =

Anglican clergyman (1915–1990)

The Reverend Philip Edgcumbe Hughes
- Born: 1915; Sydney, Australia
- Died: 1990 (aged 74–75); Rydal, Pennsylvania, US
- Occupations: Anglican priest; biblical scholar

Ecclesiastical career
- Religion: Christianity (Anglican)
- Ordained: 1941 (priest)
- Congregations: St. John's Episcopal Church, Huntingdon Valley

Academic background
- Education: University of Cape Town; University of London; Australian College of Theology

Academic work
- Discipline: Biblical studies
- Sub-discipline: New Testament studies

Philip Edgcumbe Hughes (1915–1990) was an Anglican clergyman and New Testament scholar whose life spanned four continents: Australia, where he was born; South Africa, where he spent his formative years; England, where he was ordained; and the United States, where he died in 1990, aged 75.

== Career ==
Hughes was born in Sydney in 1915, one of two twin boys born to the literary critic Randolph William Hughes and Muriel Hughes (née Stanley Hall). He received his BA, MA, and DLH degrees from the University of Cape Town, his BD degree from the University of London, and his Th.D. degree from the Australian College of Theology.

Hughes grew up in South Africa, and took his first degree there just before the Second World War. While there he was a member of the Church of England in South Africa, he briefly served as one of its ministers, and he was a commissary to the CESA Presiding Bishop.

In 1940 Hughes moved to England to attend Tyndale Hall, Bristol, and was ordained priest in 1941. After some years of pastoral work, he returned to the institution from 1947 to 1953 as tutor and Vice-principal. Along with Geoffrey Bromiley and J. Stafford Wright, he established an enviable reputation for Tyndale Hall as a conservative evangelical college with a serious interest in theology and a loyalty to historic Anglicanism.

From 1953 to 1956 he was Secretary of Church Society; and from 1959 to 1967 editor of Church Society’s journal, The Churchman.

From 1964 he moved to the United States to teach at American seminaries, including Columbia Theological Seminary, Decatur, Georgia (1964-1968), Westminster Theological Seminary, Philadelphia, PA, Gordon-Conwell Theological Seminary, South Hamilton, MA, and Trinity School for Ministry, Ambridge, PA.

While living and teaching in Pennsylvania, he was Associate Rector at St. John's Episcopal Church, Huntingdon Valley.

In theology Hughes was a firm Calvinist, but had the breadth of sympathies of a true scholar. As a staunch Anglican, he threw himself into the life of The Episcopal Church (United States) and sought to strengthen the cause of orthodoxy there in difficult times. His writings are solid in substance and graceful in prose style. His Greek was excellent, and three of his chief books are commentaries on the Second Epistle to the Corinthians, the Epistle to the Hebrews, and the Book of Revelation. In doctrine, his great work is The True Image: The Origin and Destiny of Man in Christ, on the Christian doctrine of man. He wrote studies on the precursors of the Reformers: Lefèvre: Pioneer of Ecclesiastical Renewal in France and an unpublished thesis on Pico della Mirandola. He also translated Pierre-Charles Marcel's Biblical Doctrine of Infant Baptism, which had great influence. For some years he ably edited The Churchman.

== Personal life ==
Hughes and his wife Margaret had one daughter, Marion. In his leisure time he enjoyed playing the piano.

He died in 1990 in Rydal, Pennsylvania.

== Selected works ==
=== Books ===
- Hughes, Philip Edgcumbe (1956). Scripture and Myth: An Examination of Rudolph Bultmann's Plea for Demythologization. Tyndale Biblical Theology Lecture.
- ——— (1960). Theology of the English Reformers. Grand Rapids, MI: Eerdmans. OCLC 665320.
- ——— (1962). Paul's Second Epistle to the Corinthians: The English Text with Introduction, Exposition and Notes. New International Commentary on the New Testament. Grand Rapids, MI: Eerdmans. ISBN 978-0-802-82186-7. OCLC 168927.
- ——— (1964). Christianity and the Problems of Origins. International library of philosophy and theology: Biblical and theological Studies Series. Philadelphia, PA: Presbyterian and Reformed Pub. OCLC 4988519.
- ——— (1964). But for the Grace of God: Divine Initiative and Human Need. Christian Foundations Series. Vol. 2. Philadelphia, PA: Westminster Press. OCLC 3460443.
- ——— (1964). Evangelicals and Unity. ?
- ——— (1965). Philosophy and Christianity. ?
- ——— (1966). The Register of the Company of Pastors of Geneva in the Time of Calvin. Grand Rapids, MI: Eerdmans. OCLC 932592.
- ——— (1966). Creative Minds in Contemporary Theology: A Guidebook to the Principal Teachings of Karl Barth, G. C. Berkouwer, Emil Brunner, Rudolf Bultmann, Oscar Cullmann, James Denney, C. H. Dodd, Herman Dooyeweerd, P. T. Forsyth, Charles Gore, Reinhold Niebuhr, Pierre Teilhard de Chardin, and Paul Tillich. Grand Rapids, MI: Eerdmans. OCLC 7911.
- ——— (1967). Guidelines: Anglican Evangelicals Face the Future. ?
- ——— (1976). Interpreting Prophecy: An Essay in Biblical Perspectives. Grand Rapids, MI: Eerdmans. ISBN 978-0-802-81630-6. OCLC 1974000.
- ——— (1977). A Commentary on the Epistle to the Hebrews. Grand Rapids, MI: Eerdmans. ISBN 978-0-802-83495-9. OCLC 2985322.
- ——— (1977). Hope for a Despairing World: The Christian Answer to The Problem of Evil. Grand Rapids, MI: Baker Book House. OCLC 3915293.
- ——— (1982). Faith and Works: Cranmer and Hooker on Justification. Wilton, CT: Morehouse-Barlow Co. ISBN 978-0-819-21315-0. OCLC 9162216.
- ——— (1983). Christian Ethics in Secular Society. Grand Rapids, MI: Baker Book House. ISBN 978-0-801-04267-6. OCLC 9543602.
- ——— (1984). Lefèvre: Pioneer of Ecclesiastical Renewal in France. Grand Rapids, MI: Eerdmans. ISBN 978-0-802-80015-2. OCLC 10998153.
- ——— (1988). No Cross, No Crown: The Temptations of Jesus. Wilton, CT: Morehouse Publishing. ISBN 978-0-819-21423-2.
- ——— (1989). The True Image: The Origin and Destiny of Man in Christ. Grand Rapids, MI: Eerdmans. ISBN 978-0-802-80314-6. OCLC 18414422.
- ——— (1990). The Book of the Revelation: A Commentary. Pillar New Testament Commentary. Grand Rapids, MI: Eerdmans. ISBN 978-0-802-83684-7. OCLC 22239684. - It is now out of print and will be replaced in the series by D. A. Carson’s treatment of Revelation.

=== Articles ===
- ——— (1951). "The Biblical Doctrine of the State". The Churchman. 65 (3).
- ——— (1962). "The Doctrine of Justification as Taught by the English Reformers". The Churchman. 76 (3).
- ——— (1964). "The Geneva of John Calvin". The Churchman. 78 (4).
- ——— (1975). "Preaching, Homilies, and Prophesyings in Sixteenth Century England". The Churchman. 89 (1).
- ——— (1997). "The Reformers' View of Inspiration". The Churchman. 111 (4).
