= John Halahan =

Irish priest

John Halahan was a long serving Irish Anglican priest: most notably Dean of Ross from 1905 to 1919.

Halahan was born in Dublin and educated at Trinity College, Dublin He was ordained deacon in 1846 and priest in 1847. He spent his whole career at Berehaven.

Religious titles
Preceded by Isaac Morgan Reeves	Dean of Ross, Ireland; 1905-1919	Succeeded by Harry Becher
