= James Bond (priest) =

James Forward Bond (1785–1829) was an Irish Anglican priest in the first half of the 19th-century.

Bond was the son of Wensley Bond, Dean of Ross, Ireland from 1772 to 1813. He was born in County Sligo and educated at Trinity College, Dublin He was Dean of Ross, Ireland from 1813 until his death.

Religious titles
Preceded by Wensley Bond	Dean of Ross, Ireland; 1813–1829	Succeeded by James Stannus
