= Thomas Stannus =

Irish politician

Thomas Stannus (1736–1813) was an Irish soldier and politician, of the Stannus family which later produced the celebrated dancer and choreographer Dame Ninette de Valois (born Edris Stannus).

He was the son of Trevor Stannus of Stannus Hill, Portarlington, who held office as High Sheriff of County Louth, and Jane Sibthorpe, daughter of Stephen Sibthorpe, MP for County Louth.

He was an Army captain, who fought in the American War of Independence and was seriously wounded. He was Escheator of Leinster in 1800. He was Member of Parliament (MP) for Portarlington from 1798 to 1800.

He married Caroline Hamilton, one of the numerous children of James Hamilton of Sheephill Park, County Dublin, Deputy Prothonotary of the Court of King's Bench (Ireland), (whose portrait was painted by Gilbert Stuart), and sister of Hans Hamilton MP, and had eight children. His son James was Dean of Ross, Ireland from 1830 to 1876. Another son Thomas, a soldier like his father, was the great-grandfather of Edris Stannus, better known as Ninette de Valois: her father was Colonel Thomas Stannus, DSO.

== Arms ==
Coat of arms of Thomas Stannus

Notes
Confirmed posthumously on 14 May 1857 by Sir John Bernard Burke, Ulster King of Arms.
Crest
A talbot's head proper collared and lined Or in the mouth a martlet Sable.
Escutcheon
Argent on a fess between three pigeons rising Azure a tiger's face proper between two mullets of the first.
Motto
Et Vi Et Virtute
