= Mark Pagett =

Irish Anglican priest

Mark Pagett was a Seventeenth century Irish Anglican priest.

A graduate of Trinity College, Dublin and Prebendary of Kileedy and Chancellor of Cork from 1632 to 1639 was the Dean of Ross, Ireland until 1661.

Religious titles
Preceded by John Eveleigh	Dean of Ross, Ireland; 1664–1679	Succeeded by Rowland Davies
