= Frank Colquhoun =

British Church of England priest and author

Frank Colquhoun (28 October 1909 – 3 April 1997) was a British Church of England priest and author.

== Life and career ==
Born in 1909 into a clergy family, Frank Colquhoun was educated at Warwick School and Durham University. A member of University College, he graduated LTh (1932), BA (1933), and later received an MA (1937). After his ordination in 1933, he served as curate at St Faith, Maidstone and then Christ Church, New Malden (1935–1939). He became vicar of St Michael and All Angels, Blackheath in 1939, a post he held until 1946. During the Second World War, his church was heavily affected by air raids. In 1944, he became one of the first faculty members of the newly-founded London Bible College, alongside Ernest Kevan and L.F.E. Wilkinson (later principal of Oak Hill College).

After leaving Blackheath, Colquhoun was appointed as the Editorial Secretary for the National Church League, an evangelical Anglican association that was a forerunner of Church Society. As part of this role, he also served as editor of the journal Churchman, which published themed issues representing a range of evangelical Anglican scholarship. At the journal, he worked alongside an editorial board chaired by Max Warren, Canon of Westminster Abbey. During his tenure, the publication was given the subtitle "A Quarterly Journal of Anglican Theology", a decision taken, in Colquhoun's words, "to secure the services of scholars who were of evangelical spirit but might not want to be labelled Evangelical." Colquhoun's period as editor ended in September 1953, when he was succeeded by John Pollock.

In 1952, he was inducted as Priest-in-Charge of Christ Church, Woburn Square, an office he held alongside acting as editorial secretary of the World Evangelical Alliance. He then became vicar of Holy Trinity Wallington in 1954. During his period at Wallington, he became involved in Billy Graham's first evangelistic crusades in London.

In 1959, while still serving in Wallington, he was made an Honorary Canon of Southwark Cathedral. Two years later, he left Wallington and became Canon Residentiary. During his incumbency, he was involved in the Southwark Ordination Course, a non-residential ministry training programme established by John Robinson. Colquhoun was initially deputy principal, but succeeded Stanley Evans as Principal after his death in a traffic accident in 1966. He held the role of Principal until 1972. During this time, he also served as the cathedral's chancellor.

While at Southwark, Colquhoun caused controversy by criticising the Dean of St Paul's Cathedral during a morning sermon, after the Dean had parachuted from the dome of St Paul's to illustrate a sermon. Roger Royle recalled that, following this incident, "for a while relations between St Paul's and Southwark were a little chilly to say the least."

In 1973, at the age of 64, he became Canon Residentiary at Norwich Cathedral. He also served as Vice-Dean and Treasurer, as well as a director of ordination training. In an obituary, Alan Webster described his preaching as "fine and memorable", showing a "reverence for the scriptures and his shrewd and kindly commonsense." Colquhoun retired from church ministry in 1978, moving to Bexhill-on-Sea. He continued writing in his retirement.

In 1994, he was awarded the Cross of St Augustine by Archbishop George Carey, in recognition of his contributions to ordination training and liturgical writing.

== Theology ==
Colquhoun was an evangelical Christian, described in one obituary as representing a "restrained Evangelical tradition". He was known for his willingness to mediate between, and work with, representatives of different theological traditions in the Church of England. Reflecting on unity between Christians of different traditions, Colquhoun wrote in 1957, "the Bible lays more emphasis upon fellowship than upon mere negative separation."

When his colleague John Robinson published the controversial book, Honest to God in 1963, Colquhoun was challenged by other evangelicals about his relationship with Robinson. Colquhoun later stated, "whatever differences there might have been between us, we had one thing in common: a profound love and reverence of the scriptures."

== Personal life ==
Colquhoun married Dora Slater in 1934; the couple had one son and one daughter. Dora died in 1971. Colquhoun married Judy Kenney in 1973.

== Published works ==
Colquhoun wrote a variety of Christian books, beginning in 1955 with Harringay Story, an account of Billy Graham's first London crusades. His most significant works were his collections of prayers, beginning with Parish Prayers (1967). While in parish ministry, he had recognised a need for a comprehensive collection of prayers that could be used in services, and compiled Parish Prayers in response to this need while he was Canon at Southwark. Parish Prayers included 1,798 prayers, indexed according to occasion. Some were gathered from other sources, some were written by Colquhoun himself. It became a standard work, which found widespread use across the Church of England. Colquhoun later produced additional volumes of prayers, including Contemporary Parish Prayers (1975) and New Parish Prayers (1982), although these were less widely used.
