= Wensley Bond =

Irish Anglican priest

Wensley Bond (1742–1820) was an Irish Anglican priest in the second half of the 18th century and the first two decades of the 19th.

Bond was born in County Longford and educated at Trinity College, Dublin He held livings at Sligo and Clough. He was Dean of Ross from 1743 until 1772. Bond was also Prebendary of Termonbarry in Elphin Cathedral from 1774 to 1775. and Treasurer of Ferns Cathedral from 1776 until his death.

Religious titles
Preceded by Arthur St. George	Dean of Ross; 1772–1813	Succeeded by James Bond
