= Arthur St. George =

Arthur St. George, a graduate of Trinity College, Dublin and the Chancellor of Clogher, was a Seventeenth century Irish Anglican priest: he was Dean of Ross, Ireland from 1743 until 1772.

Religious titles
Preceded by Jemmett Browne	Dean of Ross, Ireland; 1743–1772	Succeeded by Wensley Bond
