= Charles Webster =

Charles Webster may refer to:

- Charles Webster (cricketer) (1838–1881), cricketer who played for Yorkshire County Cricket Club
- Charles Carroll Webster (1824-1893), American lawyer and politician
- Charles L. Webster (1851–1891), publisher of many of Mark Twain's books and Twain's business manager
  - Charles L. Webster and Company (1884–1894), publishing company founded by Mark Twain and named for and managed by Charles L. Webster
- Charles Webster (historian) (1886–1961), British historian and diplomat
- Charles Webster (historian of medicine), historian and academic
- Charles Webster (musician) (born c. 1965), British electronic musician and producer
- Charlie Webster (politician), American politician
- Charles Webster (priest), dean of Ross
- Charlie Webster (footballer), English association footballer

== See also ==
- Charles Webster Leadbeater (1854–1934), member of the Theosophical Society and author on occult subjects
- Charles Webster Hawthorne (1872–1930), American portrait and genre painter
- Charlie Webster (disambiguation)
