= John Eveleigh (priest) =

Irish dean

John Eveleigh, Rector of Killane and then Precentor of Cloyne, was the Dean of Ross, Ireland from 1639 until 1664.

Religious titles
| Preceded by John Chappel | Dean of Ross, Ireland; 1639–1664 | Succeeded by Mark Pagett |
