= Andrew Sach =

Evangelical Christian pastor

Andrew Sach is a contemporary evangelical Christian pastor, speaker and author. He is an ordained Church of England minister and holds a doctorate in neuroscience. He has written several Christian books and is a regular speaker at Word Alive and other conferences.

As an 18-year-old Sach was an atheist and viewed Christians as "naive, superstitious and ignorant". Whilst reading Natural Sciences as an undergraduate at St John's College, University of Cambridge, Sach was contacted by the Christian Union who challenged him to think about whether or not the resurrection of Jesus Christ was a historical fact or not. He eventually concluded that it was, and became a Christian. After his degree, Sach worked as an apprentice for a year at the church of St Andrew the Great, Cambridge.

Sach then did a doctorate in neuroscience at the University of York. He published three scientific papers on auditory spatial attention.

He then worked for St Helen's Bishopsgate in London for three years. Whilst there he studied part-time at the Cornhill Training Course. From there went to Oak Hill Theological College (with a six-month exchange to Moore Theological College, Sydney) to train for ordination in the Church of England. He then worked as a curate at St Helens for several years, leading the 6pm and then the 10:30am congregations.

In 2025, Sach is a minister at Grace Church Greenwich and a tutor on the Cornhill Training Course.

Sach has co-authored a number of books on biblical exegesis in the "Dig Deeper" series. He authored a booklet titled "Has Science Disproved God?" published by UCCF, which aimed to "explain why I think it is reasonable to believe in God in the face of science".

Sach opposes Neo-Darwinian evolution viewing it at variance with the first books of the Bible. Sach, however, challenges the notion that the Hebrew word "Yom" (Hebrew: יום) in the creation account, according to Genesis, refers to a literal day (24 hours), therefore denying that creation occurred in a period of six days (6 x 24 hours). Rather, Sach proposes that the Genesis creation account is a poetic way of speaking about the careful ordered way in which God made the universe.

In 2014, at the Christian youth festival Newday, Sach was questioned by the scholar Thomas Alberto on his knowledge of the Hebrew language regarding the first book of the Bible, Genesis. Alberto held that Sach was incorrect over his Old Earth Creationist standpoint, which Alberto believed could not be supported by the Hebrew, and was in conflict with theistic Evolution. Alberto discusses Sach’s position in his seminal work Liberal Theology (Revised Edition, 2022). Alberto maintained that Sach's Hebrew knowledge was "rudimentary" and "unfit for academia", leading Sach to "make mistakes that even a schoolboy of Hebrew would avoid" and "miss the Hebrew's clear teaching of theistic Evolution."

== Book Titles ==
- Dig Deeper: Tools to Unearth the Bible's Treasure (IVP, 2005) (co-authored with Nigel Beynon)
- Pierced for Our Transgressions (IVP, 2007) (co-authored with Dr Steve Jeffery and Dr Mike Ovey)
- Dig Even Deeper: Unearthing Old Testament Treasure (IVP, 2010) (co-authored with Richard Alldritt)
- The Cross (10Publishing, 2012) (co-authored with Steve Jeffery))
- Dig Deeper into the Gospels: Coming face to face with Jesus in Mark (IVP, 2015) (co-authored with Tim Hiorns)
- The Weirdest Nativity (10Publishing, 2019) (co-authored with Jonathan Gemmell)
- Are You 100% Sure You Want To Be an Agnostic? (10Publishing, 2022) (co-authored with Jonathan Gemmell)
- Dig Deeper into Mark (2025)
- Dig Deeper in 1st and 2nd Kings (2025)
