= International Standard Bible Encyclopedia =

Two different versions of a Bible encyclopedia

- Cover of the revised edition
- Author: Geoffrey W. Bromiley
- Genre: Religion
- Publication date: 1959
- ISBN: 978-0802837820

The International Standard Bible Encyclopedia refers to two different versions of a Bible encyclopedia: a 1915 fundamentalist edition, and a 1979–1995 revised evangelical edition.

== Version of 1915 ==
The first version was published under the general editorship of the fundamentalist James Orr (1844–1913), aiming (among other objectives) to counteract the impact of higher criticism. The original encyclopedia was published by the Howard-Severance Co. in Chicago in 1915. It is in the public domain and can be found freely available at various sites.

== Version of 1979-1995 ==
A revised version, edited by Geoffrey W. Bromiley, was published by Wm. B. Eerdmans Publishing Co. in the years 1979 (Vol. 1, Vol. 2 appeared in 1982) to 1995 (Vols. 3 and 4). It contains articles by nearly 200 evangelical scholars about archaeological discoveries, the language and literature of Bible lands, customs, family life, occupations, and the historical and religious environments of Bible people.

The first two volumes of this version won the Gold Medallion Book Award for reference books.

Writing in a 1984 book review for The Churchman, Stephen Motyer said the conservatism of the International Standard Bible Encyclopedia "is that of broad, main-line evangelicalism, although it seems to be slightly more conservative than the work it replaces". He also says it makes "dogmatic use of the Bible", and adds that "sometimes it seems to go over the top somewhat". However, he concludes "The criticisms I have made do not, to my mind, qualify the great solid worth of this production....I...seriously commend this encyclopedia..."
