= William Bolton (priest) =

William Bolton , Prebendary and Treasurer of Cork was the Dean of Ross, Ireland from 1630 until 1637.

Religious titles
Preceded by Hugh Persevall	Dean of Ross, Ireland; 1630–1637	Succeeded by George Horsey
