= Isaac Morgan Reeves =

Irish Anglican priest (1822-1905)

Isaac Morgan Reeves (1822-1905) was a long serving Irish Anglican priest.

Reeves educated at Trinity College, Dublin He was ordained deacon in 1844 and priest in 1845. After a curacy in Douglas, County Cork he held incumbencies at St John of Jerusalem, Hackney then Rosscarbery, County Cork.

Religious titles
Preceded by James Stannus	Dean of Ross, Ireland; 1876–1905	Succeeded by John Halahan
