= Richard Griffith (priest) =

Irish Anglican priest, dean of Ross 1710–1717

Richard Griffith was an eighteenth century Irish Anglican priest: he was Dean of Ross, Ireland from 1710 until 1717.

Religious titles
Preceded by Rowland Davies	Dean of Ross, Ireland; 1710–1717	Succeeded by Valentine French
