= Charlie Webster =

Charlie Webster is the name of:

- Charlie Webster (broadcaster), British broadcaster and campaigner
- Charlie Webster (footballer), English footballer
- Charlie Webster (politician), American politician

== See also ==
- Charles Webster
