= George Horsey (priest) =

George Horsey was an Anglican priest who was the Dean of Ross, Ireland from 1637 until 1639. He was a scholar of Westminster School and graduate of Trinity College, Cambridge.

Religious titles
Preceded by William Bolton	Dean of Ross, Ireland; 1637–1637	Succeeded by John Chappel
