= Roger T. Beckwith =

English church historian and liturgist (1929–2023)

The Reverend Roger Thomas Beckwith was an English church historian and liturgist who served from 1973 to 1994 as the Warden of Latimer House, Oxford. Among his works were Priesthood and Sacraments, Elders in Every City: The Origin and Role of the Ordained Ministry, and The Old Testament Canon of the New Testament Church. He served as a vice-president of both the Church Society and the Prayer Book Society. Lord Carey of Clifton, who was then the Archbishop of Canterbury, conferred upon him the degree of Doctor of Divinity (Lambeth) in 1992. He died in 2023.
