= Church of England Record Society =

The Church of England Record Society is a text publication society for the history of the Church of England. It was established in 1991. The society has published an annual volume since 1994, the first being Kenneth Fincham's Visitation Articles and Injunctions of the Early Stuart Church (Vol. 1). The society is a registered charity.

== Governance ==
The society's constitution stipulates that the society is governed by a council comprising the president, honorary secretary, honorary treasurer, honorary general editor and eight ordinary members, each of whom may serve terms of up to five years and are elected at the society's annual general meeting. The council can also nominate up to six vice-presidents for five-year terms. If the elected president is unable to take up office, the vice-president of longest standing takes up the presidency.

The society's current officers are as follows:

- President: Diarmaid MacCulloch (St Cross College, Oxford)
- Vice-president: Michael Snape (Durham University)
- Honorary general editor: Gareth Atkins (Queens' College, Cambridge)
- Honorary secretary: Matthew Grimley (Merton College, Oxford)
- Honorary treasurer: Joshua Bennett (Lady Margaret Hall, Oxford)

== Selected publications ==
=== 1990s ===
- Kenneth Fincham, Visitation Articles and Injunctions of the Early Stuart Church, volume 1, 1994. ISBN 9780851153537
- Jeremy Gregory, The Speculum of Archbishop Thomas Secker: the Diocese of Canterbury, 1758–1768, 1995. ISBN 9781787441125
- Sarah Brewer, The Early Letters of Bishop Richard Hurd, 1739–1762, 1995. ISBN 9781787441149
- Andrew Chandler, Brethren in Adversity: Bishop George Bell, the Church of England and the Crisis of German Protestantism, 1933–1939, 1997. ISBN 9780851156927
- Kenneth Fincham, Visitation Articles and Injunctions of the Early Stuart Church, volume 2, 1998. ISBN 9780851155180
- Gerald Bray, The Anglican Canons, 1529–1947, 1998. ISBN 9780851155579
- Stephen Taylor, From Cranmer to Davidson. A Church of England Miscellany, 1999. ISBN 9781787441170

=== 2000s ===
- Gerald Bray, Tudor Church Reform: the Henrician Canons of 1535 and the Reformatio Legum Ecclesiasticarum, 2000. ISBN 9780851158099
- Susan Mumm, All Saints Sisters of the Poor. An Anglican Sisterhood in the Nineteenth Century, 2001. ISBN 9780851157283
- Patrick Collinson, John Craig and Brett Usher, Conferences and Combination Lectures in the Elizabethan Church. Dedham and Bury St. Edmunds, 1582–1590, 2003. ISBN 9780851159386
- Tom Webster and Kenneth Shipps, The Diary of Samuel Rogers, 1634–1638, 2004. ISBN 9781843830436
- Mark Smith and Stephen Taylor, Evangelicalism in the Church of England c.1790–c.1890, 2004. ISBN 9781787441217
- Anthony Milton, The British Delegation and the Synod of Dort, 1618–19, 2005. ISBN 9781843831570
- Henrietta Blackmore, The Beginning of Women's Ministry: The Revival of the Deaconess in the Nineteenth-Century Church of England, 2007. ISBN 9781843833086
- G. M. Ditchfield, The Letters of Theophilus Lindsey (1728–1808), volume 1, 2007. ISBN 9781843833444
- Michael Snape, The Back Parts of War: The Y.M.C.A. Memoirs and Letters of Barclay Baron, 1915–1919. 2009. ISBN 9781843835196

=== 2010s ===
- Susan Hardman Moore, The Diary of Thomas Larkham, 1647–1669. 2011. ISBN 9781843837053
- Melanie Barber and Stephen Taylor, with Gabriel Sewell, From the Reformation to the Permissive Society. A Miscellany in Celebration of the 400th Anniversary of Lambeth Palace Library. 2010. ISBN 9781843835585
- G. M. Ditchfield The Letters of Theophilus Lindsey (1723–1808). Volume II: 1789–1808. 2012. ISBN 9781843837428
- Natalie Mears, Alasdair Raffe, Stephen Taylor and Philip Williamson (with Lucy Bates), National Prayers. Special Worship since the Reformation. Volume 1: Special Prayers, Fasts and Thanksgivings in the British Isles 1533–1688. 2013. ISBN 9781843838685
- Andrew Atherstone, The Journal of Bishop Daniel Wilson of Calcutta, 1845-1857. 2014. ISBN 9781783271115
- Philip Williamson, Alasdair Raffe, Stephen Taylor and Natalie Mears, National Prayers. Special Worship since the Reformation. Volume II: General Fasts, Thanksgivings and Special Prayers in the British Isles, 1689–1870. 2017. ISBN 9781843839439
- Kenneth Fincham, The Further Correspondence of William Laud. 2017. ISBN 9781787443594
