= Gary Thomas (author) =

American Christian literature author

- Born: October 24, 1961 (age 64)
- Occupations: Author, speaker, and pastor
- Spouse: Lisa Thomas
- Partner: Lisa Thomas
- Writing career
- Subject: Christianity
- Notable works: Sacred Marriage; Sacred Pathways; Authentic Faith
- Website: garythomas.com

Gary L. Thomas (born October 24, 1961) is an American evangelical minister and writer of Christian literature.

== Education ==
Thomas received a Bachelor of Arts degree in English literature from Western Washington University in 1984. He then studied under the Christian theologian J. I. Packer at Regent College in Vancouver, British Columbia, receiving a master's degree in 1988 with a concentration in systematic theology. He was awarded an honorary Doctor of Divinity degree from Western Seminary in Portland, Oregon, in 2006 in recognition of his contributions made in the field of spiritual formation.

Following from his speaking and published writing, Thomas has been heavily influenced by various other authors. These include Elton Trueblood, Dietrich Bonhoeffer, J. I. Packer, and other books that he considers to be Christian Classics. His first work, Thirsting for God, is primarily a synthesis of material from the Christian Classics.

== Career ==
=== Pastor, teacher, and speaker ===
Thomas is a regular teaching pastor at Second Baptist Church Houston, the fourth-largest church in the United States in 2013, with over 21,000 in weekly attendance. He has regularly appeared on Christian television shows and radio programs such as Focus on the Family, 100 Huntley Street, and Family Life Today. Thomas has also spoken at many large Christian conferences such as the AACC (National Christian Counseling) conference, Billy Graham's Training Center (The Cove), where he is a regular speaker, and at numerous denominational and individual church events. Since 2000, Thomas has been speaking at his own Sacred Marriage Seminars and has now spoken in 49 states and 8 countries.

Thomas is an adjunct faculty member teaching at Western Seminary in Portland, Oregon. He regularly gives talks on marriage and family issues.

=== Author ===
Thomas is the author of 20 published books. His most notable works include Sacred Marriage, Sacred Pathways, and Authentic Faith. Publishers Weekly once said "Thomas himself shows great potential for becoming the Henri Nouwen of evangelicalism."

==== Sacred Marriage ====
In Sacred Marriage, Thomas asserts that marriage is an area for spiritual formation, approaching marriage not from a "how to have a better marriage" perspective, but rather as a spiritual discipline, designed to help us grow closer to God and deeper in our faith; he teaches that "marriage is designed to make you holy more than it is to make you happy." Thomas has been quoted as describing marriage as an "arena for discipleship."

Sacred Marriage has been praised by various Christian authors and pastors. John Ortberg, author of The Life You've Always Wanted, said Sacred Marriage "gives wise, historically informed counsel to help couples not merely enjoy their marriage, but use their relationship to form Christ in one another." Kay Warren, the wife of Rick Warren who is pastor of the 3rd largest church in America, Saddleback Church, and author of The Purpose Driven Life, said "I enthusiastically recommend it to couples contemplating, or who have already entered in marriage, as [Thomas] shows is the most powerful tool God has for molding and shaping us into the image of his Son." Sheila Wray Gregoire has criticised the first edition of the book, arguing that it contains "inaccurate information about vaginismus and about neuroscience" and does not cite her book The Great Sex Rescue.

==== Sacred Pathways ====
In Sacred Pathways, Thomas attacks an asserted "one size fits all spirituality" that he said seeks to turn devotional times into "cookie cutter experiences", and instead explores nine different pathways or "spiritual temperaments" to describe how people relate to God in very different ways.

== Publications ==
- The Glorious Pursuit: Embracing the Virtues of Christ. Colorado Springs, CO: NavPress, 1998. ISBN 1-5768-3052-7
- Seeking the Face of God. Eugene, OR: Harvest House Publishers, 1999. ISBN 0-7369-0019-5
- Sacred Marriage: What If God Designed Marriage to Make Us Holy More Than to Make Us Happy. Grand Rapids, MI: Zondervan, 2000. ISBN 0-310-24282-7
- Sacred Pathways: Discover Your Soul's Path to God. Grand Rapids, MI: Zondervan, 2000. ISBN 9780310242840.
- Authentic Faith: The Power of a Fire-Tested Life. Grand Rapids, MI: Zondervan, 2002. ISBN 0-310-23692-4
- "Wise Christians clip obituaries". Knowing & Doing: 12–15, 23. Spring 2002.
- Not the End but the Road: The Journey Toward a Virtuous Life. Colorado Springs, CO: NavPress, 2004. ISBN 1-5768-3603-7
- Sacred Parenting: How Raising Children Shapes Our Souls. Grand Rapids, MI: Zondervan, 2004. ISBN 0-310-24734-9
- Devotions for Sacred Marriage: A Year of Weekly Devotions for Couples. Grand Rapids, MI: Zondervan, 2005. ISBN 0-3102-5595-3
- Devotions for Sacred Parenting: A Year of Weekly Devotions for Parents. Grand Rapids, MI: Zondervan, 2005. ISBN 0-3102-5596-1
- Sacred influence: How God Uses Wives to Shape the Souls of Their Husbands. Grand Rapids, MI: Zondervan, 2006. ISBN 978-0-3102-7768-2
- The Beautiful Fight: Surrendering to the Transforming Presence of God Every Day of Your Life. Grand Rapids, MI: Zondervan, 2007. ISBN 978-03102-7273-1
- Holy Available: What If Holiness Is About More than What We Don't Do?. Grand Rapids, MI: Zondervan, 2009. ISBN 978-0-3102-9200-5
- Pure pleasure : why do Christians feel so bad about feeling good?. Grand Rapids, MI: Zondervan, 2009. ISBN 0-310-29080-5
- Room management in mainstreamed/Integrated classrooms. Educational Research, CO : David C Cook, 2014. ISBN 978-1-4347-0490-0*l. Grand Rapids, MI: Zondervan, 2011. ISBN 0-310-29081-3
- Simply Sacred: Daily Readings. Grand Rapids, MI: Zondervan, 2011. ISBN 978-0310329688
- Thirsting For God: Spiritual Refreshment for the Sacred Journey. Eugene, OR: Harvest House Publishers, 2011. ISBN 978-0-7369-2890-8
- Sacred Search: What if It's Not About Who You Marry, but Why?. Colorado Springs, CO : David C Cook, 2013. ISBN 978-1-4347-0489-4
- The Sacred Search: Couple's Conversation Guide. Colorado Springs, CO : David C Cook, 2013. ISBN 978-1-4347-0549-5 (Co-authored with Steve and Rebecca Wilke)
- A Lifelong Love: What If Marriage is About More Than Just Staying Together?. Colorado Springs, CO : David C Cook, 2014. ISBN 978-1-4347-0490-0
- Cherish: The One Word That Changes Everything For Your Marriage. Grand Rapids, MI: Zondervan, 2017. ISBN 978-0-310-34726-2

== Awards ==
In 2003, Authentic Faith won the Gold Medallion Award in the "Christian Living" category.
