= John Chappel =

John Chappel , a prebendary of Cork was the Dean of Ross, Ireland from 1637 until 1639.

Religious titles
Preceded by George Horsey	Dean of Ross, Ireland; 1637–1639	Succeeded by John Eveleigh
