= Christopher Peters =

Christopher Lind Peters has been Dean of Ross, Ireland, since 1998.

Peters was educated at Oak Hill Theological College; and ordained in 1983. After curacies in Knockbreda and Lisburn he held incumbencies at Kilmocomogue (1987–1993); Killiney, (1993–1998); and Rosscarbery, (1998–). He was Chancellor of Saint Fin Barre's Cathedral from 1998.

Religious titles
Preceded by Richard Crosbie Aitken Henderson	Dean of Ross, Ireland; 1998–	Succeeded by Current incumbent
