= Mike Ovey =

Principle of Oak Hill College in England

The Reverend Mike Ovey
- Principal of Oak Hill College
- Church: Church of England
- In office: 2007 to 2017
- Other posts: Lecturer at Moore Theological College, Sydney (1995–1998); Assistant Curate of All Saints Church, Crowborough (1991–1995)

Orders
- Ordination: 1991 (deacon); 1992 (priest)

Personal details
- Born: Michael John Ovey; 9 December 1958 Isle of Wight, United Kingdom
- Died: 7 January 2017 (aged 58) London, England
- Denomination: Anglicanism
- Spouse: Heather
- Children: Three
- Education: Balliol College, Oxford; Ridley Hall, Cambridge; Trinity College, Cambridge; Moore Theological College; King's College, London

Michael John Ovey (9 December 1958 – 7 January 2017) was a British Anglican clergyman, academic, and former lawyer. From 2007 until his death, he was Principal of Oak Hill College, a conservative evangelical theological college in London, England.

== Early life and education ==
Ovey was born on 9 December 1958 on the Isle of Wight, United Kingdom. He studied at Balliol College, Oxford, graduating with a Bachelor of Arts (BA) degree in 1981. He remained at Balliol College to study for the Bachelor of Civil Law (BCL) degree, a postgraduate degree, which he completed in 1982. He then worked as a lawyer in the Civil Service where he would help draft government legislation.

In 1988, Ovey matriculated into Ridley Hall, Cambridge, an Evangelical Anglican theological college, to train for ordained ministry. During this time, he also studied theology at Trinity College, Cambridge, from which he graduated with a further BA degree in 1991. After three years training, he left Ridley Hall to be ordained in the Church of England.

Ovey continued his studies during his ministry. He graduated with a Master of Theology (MTh) degree from Moore Theological College (accredited by the Australian College of Theology) in 2000. He undertook postgraduate research at King's College, London (a constituent college of the University of London), completing his Doctor of Philosophy (PhD) degree in 2005. His doctoral thesis was titled The Eternal Relation between the Father and the Son and Its Handling by Selected Patristic Theologians, with Particular Reference to John's Gospel.

== Ordained ministry ==
Ovey was ordained in the Church of England as a deacon in 1991 and as a priest in 1992. From 1991 to 1995, he served his curacy at All Saints Church, Crowborough in the Diocese of Chichester. He then moved to Australia, where he worked as a Junior Lecturer at Moore Theological College, Sydney.

Having returned to England in 1998, Ovey joined the staff of Oak Hill College, a conservative evangelical theological college in London, as the Kingham Hill Research Fellow. From 2005 to 2007, he was also a lecturer and the College Dean. He was Principal of Oak Hill Theological College from 2007 until his death in 2017.

=== Views ===
Ovey identified as a reformed evangelical. He held complementarian beliefs: that men and women are "equal but different". In 2013, he addressed the second Global Anglican Future Conference (GAFCON) that was being held in Nairobi, Kenya. Following his death, he was described by Wallace Benn as "the foremost conservative evangelical theologian of his times".

== Death ==
Ovey died suddenly of a heart attack on 7 January 2017; he was aged 58. His funeral was held at Enfield Evangelical Free Church on 23 January 2017.

== Personal life ==
In 1987, Ovey married Heather Elizabeth Jefferyes. Together they had three children: one daughter and two sons.

== Selected works ==
- Jeffery, Steve; Ovey, Michael; Sach, Andrew (2007). Pierced for our transgressions: rediscovering the glory of penal substitution. Nottingham: Inter-Varsity Press. ISBN 978-1844741786.
- Ovey, Michael; Strange, Daniel (2015). Confident: Why we can trust the Bible. Fearn: Christian Focus Publications. ISBN 978-1781915547.
- Ovey, Michael (2016). Your Will Be Done: Exploring Eternal Subordination, Divine Monarchy and Divine Humility. London: The Latimer Trust. ISBN 978-1906327408.
