= Robert Sturton =

Robert Sturton, Vicar of Kinsale and Prebendary of Desertmore, was Dean of Ross, Ireland from 1591 until 1596. he was also Archdeacon of Cork from 1593 and died at Clifton, Bristol on May Day 1596.
