= Valentine French =

Valentine French (c. 1668 – October 1732) was an Irish Anglican priest who was Dean of Ross, Ireland from 1717 until 1739 and Prebendary of Cork.

He was born in Kinsale, County Cork, to Mathew French and Jane Dymond. He was a graduate of Trinity College, Dublin.

Religious titles
Preceded by Richard Griffith	Dean of Ross, Ireland; 1717–1733	Succeeded by Jemmett Browne
