= James Stannus =

James Stannus (2 October 1788 – 28 January 1876) was an Irish Anglican priest in the first half of the 19th-century.

Stannus was the son of Thomas Stannus Member of Parliament (MP) for Portarlington from 1798 to 1800. He was born in Portarlington and educated at Trinity College, Dublin After a curacy in Ballinderry he was Rector of Lisburn then Dean of Ross, Ireland from 1829 until his death.

James married Elizabeth Burrows, who was the daughter of Sir Erasmus Borrowes, (1831–1898). Their daughter, Elizabeth, married Major George Gray, and bore him a son, Harold Gray (1867–1951).

== Arms ==
Coat of arms of James Stannus

Notes
Confirmed 14 May 1857 by Sir John Bernard Burke, Ulster King of Arms.
Crest
A talbot's head proper collared and lined Or in the mouth a martlet Sable.
Escutcheon
Argent on a fess between three pigeons rising Azure a tiger's face proper between two mullets of the first.
Motto
Et Vi Et Virtute

Religious titles
Preceded by James Forward Bond	Dean of Ross, Ireland; 1830–1875	Succeeded by Isaac Morgan Reeves
