= Knowing God =

Book by J. I. Packer

- Author: J. I. Packer
- Language: English
- Genre: Religion
- Publication date: 1973

Knowing God is a book by J. I. Packer, a British-born Canadian Christian theologian. It is his best-known work, having sold over 1,000,000 copies in North America alone. Originally written as a series of articles for the Evangelical Magazine, it was first published as a book in 1973 and has been reprinted several times. In 2006, the influential evangelical magazine Christianity Today listed it as fifth on their list of "The Top 50 Books That Have Shaped Evangelicals".

In the book, Packer explores the character of God as revealed in the Bible and what he believes are the correct Christian responses to it, with chapters on such topics as God's love, grace, majesty and wrath.

== Chapters ==
- Part I: Know the Lord

1. "The Study of God"
2. "The People who Know their God"
3. "Knowing and Being Known"
4. "The Only True God"
5. "God Incarnate"
6. "He Shall Testify"
- Part II: Behold Your God!
1. "God Unchanging"
2. "The Majesty of God"
3. "God Only Wise"
4. "God's Wisdom and Ours"
5. "The Word is Truth"
6. "The Love of God"
7. "The Grace of God"
8. "God the Judge"
9. "The Wrath of God"
10. "Goodness and Severity"
11. "The Jealous God"
- Part III: If God Be For Us -
1. "The Heart of the Gospel"
2. "Sons of God"
3. "Thou our Guide"
4. "These Inward Trials"
5. "The Adequacy of God"

== Editions ==
Year	Publisher	ISBN	Notes
1973	Inter-Varsity Press	ISBN 978-0-87784-866-0	
1973	Hodder and Stoughton	ISBN 978-0-87784-866-0	
1975	Hodder and Stoughton	ISBN 978-0-340-19713-4	
1981	Gospel Mission Press		
1993	Inter-Varsity Press	ISBN 978-0-8308-1651-4	20th anniversary edition
2004	Hodder and Stoughton	ISBN 978-0-340-86354-1	
2005	Hodder and Stoughton	ISBN 978-0-340-86354-1	
2021	Inter-Varsity Press	ISBN 978-0-8308-4861-4	Foreword by Kevin J. Vanhoozer

=== Foreign-language versions ===
- German: Gott erkennen. Das Zeugnis vom einzig wahren Gott. (1977, 4th ed. 2005)
- Chinese: Ren shi shen (1979, trans. Laiwei Lin; reprinted 2004)
- Spanish: Hacia el conocimiento de Dios (1979)
- Korean: Hananim ŭl anŭn chisik (1982, trans. Kang Sŏmun; reprinted 1996)
- Svenska: Lär känna Gud (1983, trans. Ingemar Fast)
- Polish: Poznawanie Boga (1989, trans. Konstanty Wiazowski)
- Russian: Poznatʹ Boga (1992, trans. Vladimir Alekseev) + Poznanie Boga (Познание Бога, trans. O. Lukmanova, 1997, 2007, 2009)
- French: Connaître Dieu (1994)
- Dutch: God leren kennen (1995)
- Italian: Conoscere Dio (1995, trans. G.Manfredi; reprinted 2006; ISBN 978-8-888-27081-4)
- Greek: Gnōrise ton Theo (1998, trans. Phrosō Dalaka)
- Estonian: Jumalat pole keegi näinud (2004, trans. Lii Tõrra)
