= Latimer Trust =

Evangelical Christian think tank

The Latimer Trust is a conservative evangelical Christian think tank in the United Kingdom.

== Overview ==
The Latimer Trust is an evangelical think-tank dedicated to providing biblical input and a considered response to significant issues within the Christian community and elsewhere, with a particular focus on the Church of England. The trust is continuing and developing the work of Latimer House in Oxford during the 1960s. It produces books, studies, briefings and publications and supports research by grants and funding posts. The Latimer Collection is now housed within the library at Oak Hill Theological College in London.

Trustees have included Donald Allister and Wallace Benn, and J. I. Packer was Hon. President. The director of research is Gerald L Bray.

=== History ===
Latimer House (the Oxford Evangelical Research Trust Limited) was set up under the initiative of J.I.Packer and John Stott as a centre for research. It was funded by donations, and published Studies, Briefings and Comments from 1978 onwards. The first Warden was Richard Coates (1960–61); he was followed by J.I.Packer (1962–69), John Wenham (1969-73), Roger Beckwith (1973–94) and Nigel Atkinson (1995–98). Towards the end of the 1990s the trust struggled financially so the decision was made, with the permission of the Charities Commission, to wind it up and roll the proceeds of the sale of the house in Oxford into a new charity, The Latimer Trust, reg. charity no. 1084337. The books and journals have been rehoused in the library at Oak Hill Theological College, London N14 4PS, where the Latimer Trust office is now situated.

=== Current activities ===
Since 2001 the trust has resumed its publishing activities, and maintains the interest in research by funding posts and offering small grants. The first director of research (2006-) is Gerald Bray; research fellows have been Matthew Sleeman (2001-5), Andrew Atherstone (2005-) and Kirsten Birkett (2013-). The trust has been approached by international organisations to publish significant works, such as ‘Being Faithful’ and its predecessor, ‘The Way, The Truth and the Life’ for GAFCON (now the Fellowship of Confessing Anglicans).

== Books ==
- Series of Studies (approx 40-100 pages)- well researched discussions of topical issues
- Series of Briefings - usually shorter discussions aimed at a wider audience
- J. I. Packer, N. T. Wright, Anglican Evangelical Identity: Yesterday and Today (Latimer Trust, 2008)
- Lisa Nolland (ed.), Chris Sugden (ed.), Sarah Finch (ed.), God, Gays & the Church: Human Sexuality in Christian Thinking (Latimer Trust, 2008)
- John Stott, Alec Motyer, Lee Gatiss, The Anglican Evangelical Doctrine of Infant Baptism
- GAFCON, Being Faithful: The Shape of Historic Anglicanism Today (Latimer Trust, 2009)
- GAFCON, The Way of the Cross: Biblical Resources for a Global Anglican Future - 6 studies (Latimer Trust, 2008)
- Gerald Bray, The Faith We Confess: An Exposition of the 39 Articles (Latimer Trust, 2009)
- Lee Gatiss (ed.), Pilgrims, Warriors, and Servants: Puritan Wisdom for Today's Church (Latimer Trust, 2010)
- Lee Gatiss, The True Profession of the Gospel: Augustus Toplady and Reclaiming our Reformed Foundations (Latimer Trust, 2010)
- Gerald Bray, Translating the Bible: from William Tyndale to King James (Latimer Trust, 2010)
- Charles Raven, Shadow Gospel: Rowan Williams and the Anglican Communion Crisis (Latimer Trust, 2010)
- Lee Gatiss, Preachers, Pastors, and Ambassadors: Puritan Wisdom for Today's Church (Latimer Trust, 2011)
