= Jean Lucey Pratt =

English writer and bookseller

Jean Lucey Pratt (18 October 1909–August, 1986) was an English writer and bookseller. She published little during her lifetime and is best known as a diarist. Her anonymous Mass-Observation diaries written in the 1940s were featured in three popular books edited by Simon Garfield. A Notable Woman: The Romantic Journals of Jean Lucey Pratt, published in 2015, is derived from private diaries she kept between 1925 and 1986.

== Life ==
Jean Lucey Pratt was born on 18 October 1909 and grew up in Wembley, where her father was an architect. Her mother, a concert pianist, died when Jean was thirteen and her father remarried two years later. She had one older brother, an engineer who worked for the Eastern Telegraph Company. She attended Princess Helena College before going to work in her father's architecture office. She took classes in architecture at the Ealing Art School and then entered University College London, where she studied first architecture and then journalism. After university Pratt lived in London, where she planned to become a writer. However, she was unable to find publishers for her novels and short stories.

In 1939, she moved to a rural cottage in Burnham Beeches, which remained her home for the rest of her life. During World War II she worked in the publicity department at High Duty Alloys in Slough.

In 1952, Hurst and Blackett published her biography of the eighteenth-century actress Margaret Woffington. The book, entitled Lovely Peggy: The Life and Times of Margaret Woffington, was published under the pseudonym Janet Camden Lucey. Reviewing it in The Spectator, C. E. Vulliamy remarked on the author's "very detailed and accurate knowledge of stage-life in the eighteenth century" and pronounced that the book merited "a prominent place" in "the special category of theatrical biographies". She also published several articles on architectural subjects, including one in the Architectural Review.

In 1955, she opened "The Little Bookshop" in Farnham Common. A cat lover herself, she specialized in books about cats. According to an obituary, her shop was "the largest supplier of specialist cat books in the country", with mail order customers around the world. She retired from the bookshop in 1981 and died in August 1986.

== Diaries ==
Beginning in 1939, Pratt kept a diary for Mass-Observation, a British research organization that enlisted volunteers to write about their lives. Her Mass-Observation diaries, which had been archived at the University of Sussex, were featured in three books edited by Simon Garfield. Our Hidden Lives, published in 2005, covered the postwar period up to 1948, while We Are at War (2006) and Private Battles (2007) drew on wartime diaries. Pratt, to whom Garfield gave the pseudonym "Maggie Joy Blunt", was the only diarist to appear in all three books. He described her as "a lyrical and talented writer in her mid-thirties living in a cottage by Burnham Beeches, near Slough". Our Hidden Lives was adapted into a 2005 television film for BBC Four by David Eldridge with Sarah Parish playing the Maggie Joy Blunt character.

As well as her Mass-Observation diaries, Pratt kept a personal diary from 1925, when she was fifteen, until shortly before her death in 1986. These diaries, consisting of 45 exercise books and several hundred additional pages, were inherited by her niece, who in 2013 gave Garfield permission to edit them and publish the result in book form. The diaries themselves were given to Cats Protection, a favourite charity of Pratt's, which holds the copyright.

A Notable Woman: The Romantic Journals of Jean Lucey Pratt was published in 2015 by Canongate Books. A paperback edition from the same publisher appeared in 2016. It was widely reviewed and well received, with the London Review of Books calling Pratt's diaries a "priceless find". In the New Statesman, both Hilary Mantel and Rachel Cooke chose it as a favourite book of 2015. Mantel called Pratt "the siren of Slough" and described the book as "wholly absorbing and deeply entertaining", while Cooke called it "the most moving and important book" she had read in 2015.

== Bibliography ==
- Garfield, Simon (2005). Our Hidden Lives: The Remarkable Diaries of Postwar Britain, Ebury Press. ISBN 978-0-09189-733-8
- Garfield, Simon (2006). We Are at War:The Diaries of Five Ordinary People in Extraordinary Times, Ebury Press. ISBN 978-0-09190-387-9
- Garfield, Simon (2007). Private Battles: How the War Almost Defeated Us, Ebury Press. ISBN 978-0-09191-077-8
- Lucey, Janet Camden (1952). Lovely Peggy: The Life and Times of Margaret Woffington, Hurst & Blackett.
- Pratt, Jean Lucey (2016). A Notable Woman: The Romantic Journals of Jean Lucey Pratt. Garfield, Simon (ed.). Edinburgh: Canongate Books. ISBN 978-1-78211-571-7
