= Gerald Bray =

British theologian (born 1948)

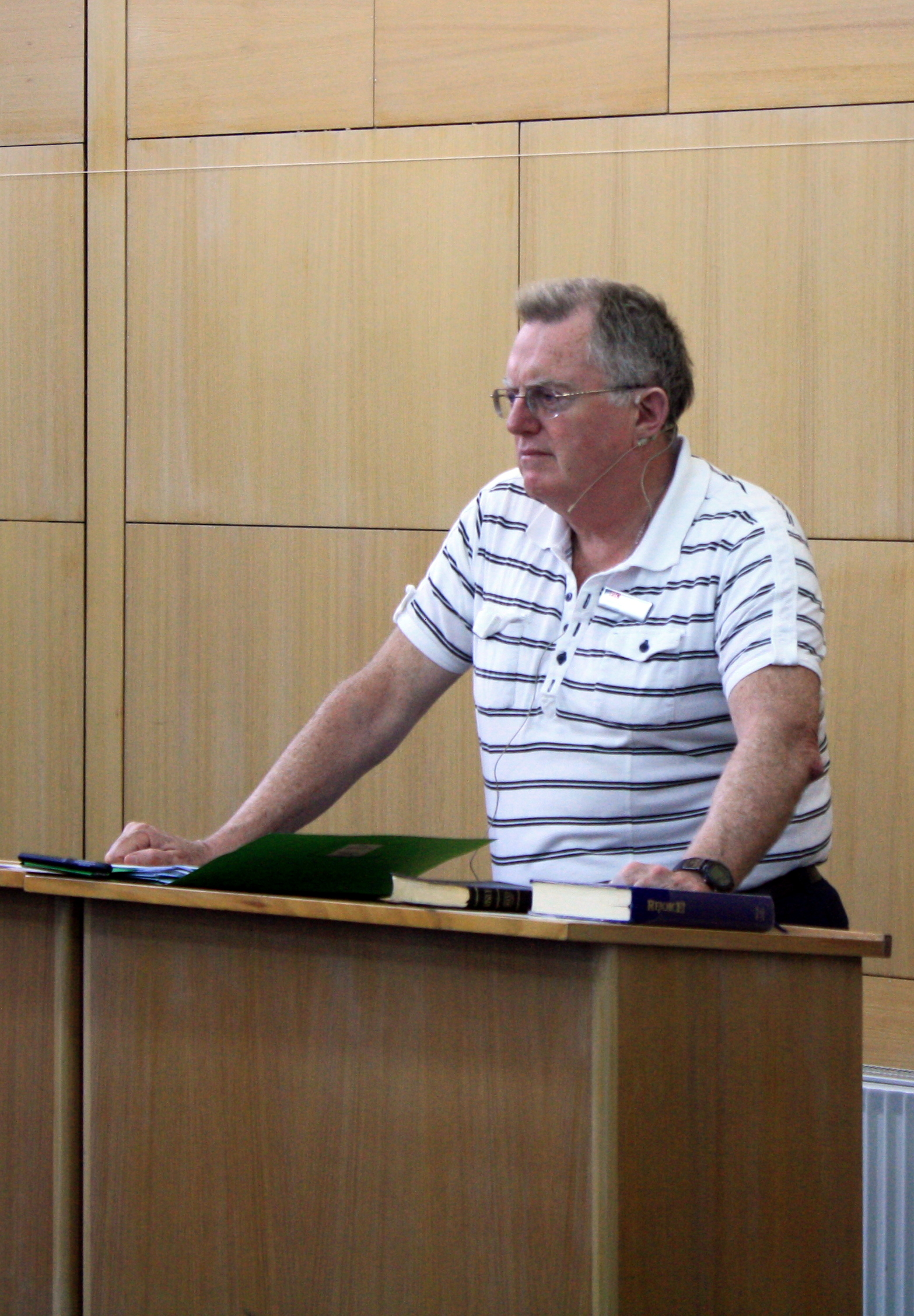
Bray lecturing on the history of Biblical interpretation at the Presbyterian Theological College

Gerald Lewis Bray (born 16 November 1948) is a British theologian, ecclesiastical historian and priest in the Church of England.

== Biography ==
Born in Montreal, Quebec, on 16 November 1948, Bray holds a BA from McGill University and a MLitt and DLitt from University of Paris-Sorbonne.

He was librarian of Tyndale House, Cambridge, from 1975 to 1978. He was ordained in the Church of England as a deacon in 1978 and as a priest in 1979. He served his curacy in the parish of St Cedd, Canning Town (Diocese of Chelmsford), until 1980. From 1980 to 1992 he taught ecclesiastical history and doctrine at Oak Hill Theological College in London. From 1993 to 2006 he taught at Beeson Divinity School where he is now a research professor. He is now also Distinguished Professor of Historical Theology at Knox Theological Seminary. He is the director of research at the Latimer Trust at Oak Hill Theological College in London.

== Writing ==
Bray's book, Biblical Interpretation: Past and Present, was one of Christianity Today's books of the year in 1997.

He has written extensively on the history of the canon law of the Church of England, publishing two major works on the subject, The Anglican Canons 1529-1947 and Tudor Church Reform, both of which were sponsored by the Church of England Record Society. He also edited the Convocation records of the Churches of England and Ireland from the Middle Ages to the nineteenth century. Bray was also the editor of the Churchman academic journal from 1983 to 2018.

His most important recent books are God is Love, a Biblical and Systematic Theology, published by Crossway (2012) and God has spoken. A history of Christian theology, also published by Crossway in 2014.

Since then he has published Augustine on the Christian Life (Crossway, 2015), The Church: A theological and historical account (Baker, 2016) and an edition of the Books of Homilies of the Church of England (James Clarke, 2016). In 2017 he published a critical edition of the Procès-Verbal de l'Assemblée Générale du Clergé de France (1788), an important witness to the French pre-revolution from the Archives Nationales in Paris.

In 2021 he published The History of Christianity in Britain and Ireland (Apollos), a magisterial study of its subject. He also published The Attributes of God (Crossway) and Anglicanism (Lexham Press) in the same year.

He has also published A Companion to the Book of Common Prayer (James Clarke, 2023), a guide to the classic 1662 Prayer Book of the Church of England intended for students and lay people generally.

== Bibliography ==
- Holiness and the Will of God: Perspectives on the Theology of Tertullian (1979) (New Foundations Theological Library)
- The Doctrine of God (Contours of Christian Theology) (1993)
- Biblical Interpretation: Past and Present (2000) ISBN 9780851114750
- God Under Fire (with Douglas S. Huffman, Eric L. Johnson, R. Douglas Geivett, Bruce A. Ware, Charles Gutenson, James S. Spiegel, Mark R. Talbot, William Lane Craig, Paul Helm, D. A. Carson, 2002)
- Yours Is the Kingdom: A systematic theology of the Lord's Prayer (IVP, 2007) ISBN 9781844742097
- Always Reforming: Explorations in Systematic Theology (with Stephen Williams, Kevin J. Vanhoozer, Richard C. Gamble, Henri Blocher, Jr Richard B. Gaffin, Cornelis P. Venema, Derek W. H. Thomas, Andrew T. B. McGowan, John Frame, 2007) ISBN 9780830828296
- Creeds, Councils and Christ: Did the Early Christians Misrepresent Jesus? (2009) ISBN 9781845505134
- We Believe in One God (Ancient Christian Doctrine) (2009) ISBN 9780830825318
- The Faith We Confess: An Exposition of the Thirty-Nine Articles (2009) ISBN 9780946307845
- Translating the Bible: from William Tyndale to King James (2010) ISBN 9780946307753
- Galatians, Ephesians (Reformation Commentary on Scripture: New Testament) (2011) ISBN 9780830829736
- The Deity of Christ (Theology in Community) (Christopher W. Morgan (ed.), Robert A. Peterson (ed.), Alan W. Gomes, J. Nelson Jennings, Andreas J. Kostenberger, Stephen J. Nichols, Raymond C. Ortlund Jr., Stephen J. Wellum, 2011)
- God Is Love: A Biblical and Systematic Theology (2012) ISBN 978-1433522697
- The Very Pure Word of God: The Book of Common Prayer as a Model of Biblical Liturgy (2012) Peter Adam (Author), Mark Burkill (Editor), Gerald L Bray (Editor) ISBN 978-1906327095
- The Kingdom of God (Theology in Community) (2012) Robert A. Peterson, Bruce K Christopher, W. Morgan ISBN 978-1433509186
- Why We Belong: Evangelical Unity and Denominational Diversity (2013) Anthony L. Chute (Author, Editor), Christopher W. Morgan (Author, Editor), Robert A. Peterson (Author, Editor), Gerald Bray (Contributor), Bryan Chapell (Contributor), David Dockery (Contributor), Timothy George (Contributor), Bryan D. Klaus (Contributor), Douglas A. Sweeney (Contributor), Timothy C. Tennent (Contributor) ISBN 9781433514838
- Fallen (Theology in Community) (2013) Christopher W. Morgan (Author), Robert A. Peterson (Author), Gerald Bray (Author), David B. Calhoun (Author), D. A. Carson (Author), Bryan Chapell (Author), Paul R. House (Author), John W. Mahony (Author), Douglas J. Moo (Author), Sydney H. Page (Author) ISBN 978-1433522123
- God Has Spoken: A History of Christian Theology (Crossway, 2014) ISBN 978-1433526947
- Augustine on the Christian Life: Transformed by the Power of God (2015) ISBN 978-1433544941
- Heresy, Schism and Apostasy (Latimer Studies Book 67) (2015) ISBN 9780946307616
- The Church: A Theological and Historical Account (Baker Academic, 2016) ISBN 978-0801030864
- The Pastoral Epistles (International Theological Commentary) (T&T Clark, 2019) ISBN 978-0567334190
- Doing Theology with the Reformers (IVP Academic, 2019) ISBN 9780830852512
- Preaching the Word with John Chrysostom (Lexham, 2020) ISBN 9781683593669
- The Attributes of God: An Introduction (Crossway, 2021) ISBN 9781433561177
- Anglicanism: A Reformed Catholic Tradition (Lexham, 2021) ISBN 9781683594369
- The History of Christianity in Britain and Ireland: From the first century to the twenty-first (Apollos, 2021) ISBN 9781789741209
- How the Church Fathers Read the Bible: A Short Introduction (Lexham, 2022) ISBN 978-1683595830
- A Companion to the Book of Common Prayer (James Clarke, 2023) ISBN 978-0-227-17930-7
