= Oak Hill College =

Evangelical theological college

- Type: Theological college
- Established: 1932
- Founder: Charles Baring Young
- Accreditation: Durham University
- Principal: James Robson
- Students: 206 (2015)
- Location: Oak Hill College, Chase Side, Southgate, London, N14 4PS, London, United Kingdom
- Campus: 60 acres
- Colors
- Website: www.oakhill.ac.uk

Oak Hill College is a conservative evangelical theological college located on Chase Side in Southgate, London, England. Its aim is to prepare men and women from the Church of England and independent churches for ministry.

== Overview ==
The College trains men and women from the Church of England and other denominations for ministry in the church and world. This includes for ordination, community work, youth and children's work and world mission. Courses can be full- or part-time, leading to a Foundation Award, Certificate or Diploma of Higher Education, or a Bachelor of Arts (Hons) degree in Theology, Ministry, and Mission. Postgraduate options include a Masters degree in Theology, Ministry, and Mission, and a Masters degree in Contemporary Christian Leadership.

Founded as a 'Test School' for potential ordination candidates to be educated to matriculation standard in 1928, it became a recognised as full Theological College in 1932. It was founded by Charles Baring Young, and continues to be part of his Kingham Hill Trust.

It has been associated with conservative evangelical theology, and continues to have a strong emphasis on Bible teaching and theology which is then applied to life and ministry. All the programmes are validated by Durham University as part of the Common Awards scheme. The college has links with a theological college in Uganda. The Latimer Trust, an Anglican think tank, is located at Oak Hill Theological College.

In September 2023 James Robson took up the post of Principal. Daniel Strange was for a time Acting Principal following the sudden and unexpected death in January 2017 of Revd Michael Ovey who had succeeded Revd David Peterson at the start of the 2007–2008 academic year. Ovey co-authored the book Pierced For Our Transgressions (Leicester: Apollos, 2006) with Steve Jeffery and Andrew Sach.

== Notable former staff ==
- George Carey, 103rd Archbishop of Canterbury
- J. I. Packer, author, theologian, Regent College, Vancouver.
- John Taylor, Bishop of St Albans
- Gerald Bray, theologian and church historian
- Christopher Byworth, Anglican liturgist and New Testament tutor, later Warden of Cranmer Hall, Durham
- Alan Storkey Sociologist, author.

=== List of principals ===
- 1928-1932: A.W. Habershon (Principal of the Test School)
- 1932-1945: H.W. Hinde
- 1945-1960: Leslie F.E. Wilkinson
- 1961–1971: Maurice Wood, later Bishop of Norwich
- 1971-1986: David Wheaton
- 1986-1996: Gordon Bridger
- 1996–2007: David G. Peterson
- 2007–2017: Michael Ovey
- 2018-2023: Johnny Juckes
- 2023-current: James Robson

== Notable alumni ==
- Cyril Ashton, former Bishop of Doncaster (Diocese of Sheffield)
- Michael Baughen, former Bishop of Chester
- Michael Bunker, former Dean of Peterborough
- George Cassidy, former Bishop of Southwell and Nottingham
- Elwin Cockett, Archdeacon of West Ham (Diocese of Chelmsford)
- Frank Collins, former 22 SAS soldier (the first to enter the Iranian Embassy Siege) and former Chaplain to the Forces (British Army)
- David Court, Bishop of Grimsby (Diocese of Lincoln)
- John Delight, former Archdeacon of Stoke
- Karowei Dorgu, Bishop of Woolwich (Diocese of Southwark)
- David Gillett, former Bishop of Bolton (Diocese of Manchester)
- David Griscome, former Dean of Elphin and Ardagh
- Philip Hacking, former chairman of the Keswick Convention
- Peter Hancock, Bishop of Bath and Wells
- Rob Munro, Bishop of Ebbsfleet
- Richard Ormston, Archdeacon of Northampton
- Ricky Panter, Archdeacon of Liverpool
- Christopher Peters, Dean of Ross, Ireland
- Peter Price, former Bishop of Bath and Wells
- Brian Woodhams, former Archdeacon of Newark
