= J. I. Packer =

English-born Canadian evangelical theologian (1926–2020)

The Reverend Canon J. I. Packer
- Packer in the 1950s
- Born: James Innell Packer; 22 July 1926; Twyning, Gloucestershire
- Died: 17 July 2020 (aged 93); Vancouver, British Columbia, Canada
- Spouse: Kit Mullett (m. 1954)

Ecclesiastical career
- Religion: Christianity (Anglican)
- Church: Church of England; Anglican Church of Canada; Anglican Network in Canada (Note: When Packer joined the Anglican Network in Canada (ANiC) in 2008, it was autocephalous. ANiC became a diocese of the Anglican Church in North America in 2009.); Anglican Church in North America
- Ordained: 1952 (deacon); 1953 (priest)

Academic background
- Education: Corpus Christi College, Oxford; Wycliffe Hall, Oxford
- Thesis: The Redemption and Restoration of Man in the Thought of Richard Baxter (1954)
- Doctoral advisor: Geoffrey Nuttall
- Influences: Richard Baxter; John Bunyan; John Calvin; C. S. Lewis; John Owen; J. C. Ryle; Charles Williams

Academic work
- Discipline: Theology
- Sub-discipline: Systematic theology
- School or tradition: Calvinism; evangelical Anglicanism
- Institutions: Tyndale Hall; Latimer House; Trinity College, Bristol; Regent College
- Notable students: Chuck Murphy; Gary Thomas
- Notable works: Knowing God (1973)
- Influenced: Duane Litfin; Carl Trueman

James Innell Packer (22 July 1926 – 17 July 2020) was an English-born Canadian evangelical theologian, cleric and writer in the low-church Anglican and Reformed traditions. Having been considered as one of the most influential evangelicals in North America, Packer is known for his 1973 best-selling book Knowing God, along with his work as the general editor of the English Standard Version Bible. He was one of the high-profile signers on the 1978 Chicago Statement on Biblical Inerrancy, a member on the advisory board of the Council on Biblical Manhood and Womanhood, and also was involved in the ecumenical book Evangelicals and Catholics Together in 1994. His last teaching position was as the board of governors' Professor of Theology at Regent College in Vancouver, British Columbia, in which he served from 1996 until his retirement in 2016 due to failing eyesight.

== Life and career ==
Packer was born on 22 July 1926 in Twyning, Gloucestershire, England, to James and Dorothy Packer. His sister, Margaret, was born in 1929. His father was a clerk for the Great Western Railway, and his lower-middle-class family was only nominally Anglican, attending the local St. Catherine's Church. When he was seven, Packer suffered a severe head injury in a collision with a bread van, which precluded him from playing sports, so he became interested in reading and writing. At 11 years of age, Packer was gifted an old Oliver typewriter. He went on to cherish typewriters for the rest of his life. In 1937, Packer went to The Crypt School, where he specialized in the classics. At age 14 he was confirmed at St. Catherine's Church.

He won a scholarship to the University of Oxford, where he was educated at Corpus Christi College, obtaining his bachelor of arts degree in 1948. In a 1944 meeting of the Oxford Inter-Collegiate Christian Union (OICCU), Packer committed his life to Christian service. It was during this time that Packer became exposed to the Puritans through OICCU's library, which were an influence he carried for the rest of his life. He also first heard lectures from C. S. Lewis at Oxford, whose teachings would (though he never knew Lewis personally) become a major influence in his life.

After college, he spent a brief time teaching Greek and Latin at Oak Hill College in London. During this 1949–1950 school year, he sat under the teaching of Martyn Lloyd-Jones at Westminster Chapel, who also would have a great influence on his thinking, and who he would know and interact with later. In 1949, Packer went back to Wycliffe Hall, Oxford, in 1949 to study theology. He obtained his Master of philosophy degree in 1954, and Doctor of Philosophy in 1954. He wrote his dissertation under Geoffrey Nuttall on the soteriology of the Puritan theologian Richard Baxter. He was ordained a deacon in 1952 and priest in 1953 in the Church of England, within which he was associated with the evangelical movement. He served as assistant curate of Harborne Heath in Birmingham from 1952 to 1954. In 1954, Packer married Kit Mullet, and they had three children, Ruth, Naomi, and Martin.

In 1955, his family moved to Bristol and Packer taught at Tyndale Hall, Bristol, from 1955 to 1961. He wrote an article denouncing Keswick theology as Pelagian in the Evangelical Quarterly. According to biographer Alister McGrath, it is widely agreed that his critique "marked the end of the dominance of the Keswick approach among younger evangelicals". It was also during this time that he published his first book, Fundamentalism and the Word of God (1958), a defense of the authority of the Bible, which sold 20,000 copies in that year and has been in print since. Packer moved back to Oxford in 1961, where he served as librarian of Latimer House in Oxford from 1961 to 1962 and warden from 1962 to 1969, an evangelical research centre he founded with John Stott. In 1970, he became principal of Tyndale Hall, Bristol, and from 1971 until 1979 he was associate principal of the newly formed Trinity College, Bristol, which had been formed from the amalgamation of Tyndale Hall with Clifton College and Dalton House-St Michael's. He became editor of the Evangelical Quarterly in the 1960s, and eventually published a series of articles he wrote in the journal into a book, Knowing God. The book, published by Hodder & Stoughton in Britain and InterVarsity Press in the United States in 1973, became a bestseller of international fame and sold over 1.5 million copies. In 1977, he signed the Chicago Statement on Biblical Inerrancy.

In 1979, one of Packer's Oxford friends persuaded him to teach at Regent College in Vancouver, eventually being named the first Sangwoo Youtong Chee Professor of Theology, a title he held until he was named a Regent College Board of Governors' Professor of Theology in 1996. At Regent he taught many classes, including systematic theology and the Puritans.

He was a prolific writer and frequent lecturer, and a frequent contributor to and an executive editor of Christianity Today. Packer served as general editor of the English Standard Version (ESV), an evangelical translation based upon the Revised Standard Version of the Bible, and theological editor of the ESV Study Bible.

Packer was associated with St. John's Shaughnessy Anglican Church, which in February 2008 voted to leave the Anglican Church of Canada over the issue of same-sex blessings. The departing church, St. John's Vancouver, joined the Anglican Network in Canada (ANiC). Packer, on 23 April, handed in his licence from the Bishop of New Westminster. (ANiC eventually co-founded and joined the Anglican Church in North America in 2009.) In December 2008, Packer was appointed an honorary clerical canon of St Andrew's Cathedral in Sydney in recognition of his long and distinguished ministry as a faithful teacher of biblical theology.

Packer had been the theologian emeritus of the Anglican Church in North America (ACNA) since its creation in 2009, being one of the nine members of the task force who wrote on a trial basis Texts for Common Prayer, released in 2013, and general editor of the task force who wrote for trial use To Be a Christian: An Anglican Catechism, approved on 8 January 2014 by the College of Bishops of the church. He was awarded the St. Cuthbert's Cross at the Provincial Assembly of ACNA on 27 June 2014 by retiring Archbishop Robert Duncan for his "unparalleled contribution to Anglican and global Christianity".

In 2016, Packer's eyesight deteriorated due to macular degeneration to a point where he could no longer read or write, consequently concluding his public ministry.

Packer died on 17 July 2020, five days before his 94th birthday.

== Theological views ==
An Evangelical, Reformed Anglican, Packer held a soteriological position described as Calvinist.

Packer had signed the Chicago Statement on Biblical Inerrancy, affirming the conservative evangelical position on biblical inerrancy.

On gender roles, Packer was a complementarian and served on the advisory board of the Council on Biblical Manhood and Womanhood. In 1991 Packer set forth his reasons for this in an influential yet controversial article called "Let's Stop Making Women Presbyters".

Packer endorsed and supported books that have advocated for theistic evolution, but also expressed caution towards the validity of evolution.

Later in life, Packer supported the ecumenical movement, which drew criticism from other evangelicals. Specifically, Packer's involvement in the book Evangelicals and Catholics Together: Toward a Common Mission (ECT) was sharply criticised, but he defended ECT by arguing that believers should set aside denominational differences for the sake of winning converts to Christianity.

Packer took the side of evangelical ecumenism in opposition to Martyn Lloyd-Jones in 1966, then co-authored a work with two Anglo-Catholics in 1970 (Growing into Union) that many evangelicals felt conceded too much biblical ground on critical doctrinal issues. The publication of that work led to the formal break between Lloyd-Jones and Packer, bringing an end to the Puritan Conferences.

== Works ==
- Fundamentalism and the Word of God (1958; reprinted 1984) ISBN 0-8028-1147-7
- Evangelism and the Sovereignty of God (1961 by Inter-Varsity Fellowship) (reprinted 1991) ISBN 0-8308-1339-X
- Our Lord's Understanding of the Law of God (1962) ASIN B0007J7B2Y
- The Church of England and the Methodist Church: Ten Essays (1963)
- God Speaks To Man: Revelation and the Bible (1965) ASIN B000K7MIYE
- Tomorrow's Worship (1966) ISBN 978-0851900360
- Guidelines: Anglican Evangelicals Face the Future (1967) ISBN 978-0854918027
- Knowing God (1973, reprinted 1993) ISBN 0-8308-1650-X
- What did the Cross Achieve? The Logic of Penal Substitution (1974) ASIN B0007AJPE0
- I Want To Be A Christian (1977) ISBN 978-0-8423-1842-6
- The Ten Commandments (1977) ISBN 978-0-8423-7004-2
- The Evangelical Anglican Identity Problem: An Analysis (1978) ISBN 978-0-946307-00-5
- The New Man (1978) ISBN 978-0-8028-1768-6
- For Man's Sake! (1978) ISBN 978-0-85364-217-6
- Knowing Man (1979) ISBN 978-0891071754
- God Has Spoken (1979) ISBN 978-0-87784-656-7
- Beyond the Battle for the Bible (1980) ISBN 978-0-89107-195-2
- Freedom and Authority (1981: International Council on Biblical Inerrancy) ISBN 978-1573830355
- A Kind of Noah's Ark? : The Anglican Commitment to Comprehensiveness (1981) ISBN 978-0-946307-09-8
- God's Words: Studies of Key Bible Themes (1981) ISBN 978-0-87784-367-2
- Freedom, Authority and Scripture (1982) ISBN 978-0-85110-445-4
- Keep In Step With The Spirit: Finding Fullness In Our Walk With God (1984, reprinted 2005) ISBN 0-8010-6558-5
- The Thirty-Nine Articles: Their Place and Use Today (1984) ISBN 978-0946307562
- Through the Year with J. I. Packer (1986) ISBN 978-0-340-40141-5
- Hot Tub Religion (1987) ISBN 978-0-8423-1854-9
- Laid-back Religion?: A penetrating look at Christianity today (1989) ISBN 978-0-8511-0799-8
- A Quest for Godliness: The Puritan Vision of the Christian Life (1990) ISBN 0-89107-819-3
- Among God's Giants: Aspects of Puritan Christianity (1991) ISBN 978-0-86065-452-0
- A Passion for Holiness (1992) ISBN 1-85684-043-3
- Rediscovering Holiness (1992) ISBN 0-89283-734-9
- Concise Theology: A Guide to Historic Christian Beliefs (1993) ISBN 0-8423-3960-4
- Knowing Christianity (1995) ISBN 978-0-87788-058-5
- A Passion for Faithfulness: Wisdom from the Book of Nehemiah (1995) ISBN 978-0-89107-733-6
- Decisions – Finding God's Will: 6 Studies for Individuals or Groups (1996) ISBN 978-0-85111-376-0
- Truth & Power: The Place of Scripture in the Christian Life (1996) ISBN 978-0-87788-815-4
- Life in the Spirit (1996) ISBN 978-0-340-64174-3
- Meeting God (2001) ISBN 978-1-85999-480-1
- God's Plans for You (2001) ISBN 978-1-58134-290-1
- Divine Sovereignty and Human Responsibility (2002) ASIN B0006S2A2W
- Faithfulness and Holiness: The Witness of J. C. Ryle (2002) ISBN 978-1-58134-358-8
- The Redemption and Restoration of Man in the Thought of Richard Baxter (2003, based on his 1954 Oxford dissertation) ISBN 1-57383-174-3
- Knowing God Through The Year (2004) ISBN 978-0-8308-3292-7
- 18 Words: The Most Important Words You Will Ever Know (2007) ISBN 978-1845503277
- Praying the Lord's Prayer (2007) ISBN 978-1-58134-963-4
- Affirming the Apostles' Creed (2008) ISBN 978-1-4335-0210-1
- Weakness Is the Way: Life with Christ Our Strength (2013) ISBN 978-1433563836
- Finishing Our Course With Joy (2014) ISBN 978-1-4335-4106-3

=== In the Anglican Agenda series ===
- Taking Faith Seriously (2006) ISBN 978-0-9781653-0-7
- Taking Doctrine Seriously (2007) ISBN 978-1-897538-00-5
- Taking Repentance Seriously (2007) ISBN 978-0-9781653-4-5
- Taking Christian Unity Seriously (2007) ISBN 978-0-9781653-6-9

=== Collections ===
- The J. I. Packer Collection, edited by Alister McGrath (1999) ISBN 978-0-8308-2287-4
- Collected Shorter Writings of J. I. Packer
  - Volume 1: Celebrating the Saving Work of God (1998) ISBN 978-0-85364-896-3
  - Volume 2: Serving the People of God (1998) ISBN 978-0-85364-904-5
  - Volume 3: Honouring the Written Word of God (1999) ISBN 978-0-85364-882-6
  - Volume 4: Honouring the People of God (1999) ISBN 978-0-85364-905-2

=== Co-authored ===
- The Spirit Within You: The Church's Neglected Possession with Alan Stibbs (1979) ISBN 978-0-8010-8142-2
- The Bible Almanac with Merrill C. Tenney and William White (1980) ISBN 978-0-8407-5162-1
- Christianity: The True Humanism with Thomas Howard (1985) ISBN 1-57383-058-5
- New Dictionary of Theology with Sinclair B Ferguson and David F Wright (1988) ISBN 978-0-8308-1400-8
- Knowing and Doing the Will of God with LaVonne Neff (1995) ISBN 978-0-89283-927-8
- Great Power with Beth Feia (1997) ISBN 978-0-85476-836-3
- Great Grace with Beth Feia (1997) ISBN 978-0-85476-837-0
- Great Joy with Beth Feia (1999) ISBN 978-0-85476-838-7
- Never Beyond Hope: How God Touches and Uses Imperfect People with Carolyn Nystrom (2000) ISBN 978-0-8308-2232-4
- Knowing God Journal with Carolyn Nystrom (2000) ISBN 978-0-8308-1185-4
- J. I. Packer Answers Questions for Today with Wendy Murray Zoba (2001) ISBN 978-0-8423-3615-4
- Hope, Never Beyond Hope: Six Studies for Individuals or Groups with Leader's Notes with Carolyn Nystrom (2003) ISBN 978-0-85111-355-5
- One Faith: The Evangelical Consensus with Thomas Oden (2004) ISBN 0-8308-3239-4
- Battle for the Soul of Canada: Raising up the Emerging Generation of Leaders (2006) ISBN 978-0-9782022-0-0
- Praying: Finding Our Way Through Duty To Delight with Carolyn Nystrom (2006) ISBN 978-0-8308-3345-0
- Guard Us, Guide Us: Divine Leading in Life's Decisions with Carolyn Nystrom (2008) ISBN 978-0-8010-1303-4
- In My Place Condemned He Stood: Celebrating the Glory of the Atonement with Mark Dever (2008) ISBN 978-1-4335-0200-2
