= Rowland Davies (priest) =

Irish clergyman (1649–1721)

Rowland Davies (1649–1721) was Church of Ireland dean of Cork.

== Life ==
The son of Rowland Davies of Bandon, County Cork, by his wife Mary Smith, maiden name Scudamore, he was born at Gille Abbey, near Cork. With education there under Mr. Scragg, he entered Trinity College, Dublin, 23 February 1665. He graduated B.A. 1671, M.A. 1681, and LL.D. 1706.

On 9 April 1671 Davies took holy orders, and on 11 May that year he was admitted to the prebend of Kilnaglory, in the diocese of Cork. He was collated 26 October 1673, and again in 1676, to the prebend of Iniscarra, in the diocese of Cloyne. In 1674 he exchanged his first preferment for the prebend of Iniskenny, in the same diocese; and he was instituted 10 February 1679 as Dean of Ross. To these benefices was added the prebend of Liscleary, in the diocese of Cork, to which he was collated 20 October 1679.

Attainted by King James II, Davies departed with others in March 1689 from Ireland, the scene of the Williamite War, and sought employment in the ministry in England. His first place was the church of Camberwell, Surrey, where a fellow-countryman, Dr. Richard Parr, was vicar. Through friends, he was appointed by the corporation of Great Yarmouth to a lectureship there; in a few months he resigned. When King William III visited Ireland Davies obtained an appointment as chaplain to one of the regiments proceeding coming from England, and he landed again in Ireland on 11 May 1690.

In 1693 Davies became vicar-general of Cloyne; in 1707 he became precentor of Cork. and resigning the deanery of Ross in 1710, he succeeded to that of Cork, on the death of Dean Pomeroy, by patent dated 17 February In the same year he was also presented to the rectory of Carrigaline, near Cork, which he resigned in 1717.

Davies died at Dawstown, Co. Cork, 11 December 1721, and was buried in the family vault in Cork Cathedral, where there was an inscription to his memory.

== Works ==
His arrival at Belfast, his participation in the battle of the Boyne, and the siege of Limerick, are recorded in Davies's Journal, edited by Richard Caulfield, LL.D., of Cork, and printed for the Camden Society, 1857.

Davies also wrote:

- A Letter to a Friend concerning his changing his Religion, London, 1692, to Mr. Turner of Limerick.
- Christian Loyalty, a Sermon preached in the Cathedral of Cork on 30 Jan. 1715, Dublin, 1716.
- A Truly Catholick and Old Religion, showing that the Established Church in Ireland is more truly a Member of the Catholick Church than the Church of Rome, and that all the Ancient Christians, especially in Great Britain and Ireland, were of her Communion, Dublin, 1716.
- A Reply to a pretended Answer to a Book entitled The Truly Catholick and Old Religion, in a Letter to the author of it, Dublin, 1717, against the Rev. Dr. Timothy O'Brien; and, O'Brien having answered it, Remarks on a Pamphlet entitled Goliath beheaded with his own Sword, or an Answer to the Reply, Dublin, 1720.

A sermon by Davies appeared in 1717. He wrote a detailed Account of the State of the Diocese of Cork in 1682, left in manuscript in the diocesan registry.

== Family ==
Davies married in 1674 Elizabeth, daughter of Captain Robert Stannard, granddaughter of Sir Robert Travers (MP) and great granddaughter of Richard Boyle, Archbishop of Tuam; she died 28 February 1715. They had four sons who reached manhood, besides other sons who died young, and several daughters. One of his sons was preferred to the archdeaconry of Cloyne in 1742.
