= Geoffrey W. Bromiley =

British historian and theologian (1915–2009)

- Born: 7 March 1915; Bromley Cross, Lancashire, England
- Died: 7 August 2009 (aged 94); Santa Barbara, California, United States

Academic background
- Education: Emmanuel College, Cambridge; University of Edinburgh

Academic work
- Discipline: Ecclesiastical history and theology
- Institutions: Fuller Theological Seminary

Geoffrey William Bromiley (7 March 1915 – 7 August 2009) was an English ecclesiastical historian and Anglican theologian. He was professor emeritus at Fuller Theological Seminary in Pasadena, California, having been Professor of Church History and Historical Theology there from 1958 until his retirement in 1987.

== Biography and education ==
Bromiley was born into an "active Christian family" in Bromley Cross, Lancashire, England, in 1915. He had three sisters, one of whom, Lillian (1917–71), became a renowned teacher and evangelist, who worked firstly in China and then among the Chinese community in Malaysia.

Bromiley was educated at Bolton School and Emmanuel College, Cambridge, receiving first-class honours in Part II of the modern and medieval languages tripos in 1936. During his time at Cambridge he was a member of the Inter-Collegiate Christian Union, and upon receiving his degree he completed further studies in theology at Tyndale Hall in Bristol. Ordained in the Church of England in 1938, Bromiley briefly served as an Anglican priest in Cumbria before commencing postgraduate research in history at the University of Edinburgh, where he received a PhD in 1943 with a dissertation on Johann Gottfried Herder and German Romanticism before Schleiermacher.

== Academic work ==
Bromiley returned to Tyndale Hall shortly after receiving his doctorate, becoming a lecturer in theology and, later, vice principal of the college (1946–51). Whilst there he earned a second doctorate (DLitt) at Edinburgh for a thesis that was subsequently published as Baptism and the Anglican Reformers. He was awarded a further honorary doctorate (DD) by the university in 1961, in recognition of his contribution to church scholarship.

Bromiley left academia to serve as Rector of St. Thomas’s Church, Edinburgh, from 1951 to 1958. In the latter year, he was appointed Professor of Church History and Historical Theology at Fuller Theological Seminary, where he remained until his retirement in 1987. He helped to launch the seminary's PhD degree programme in history, supervising several students using the Oxbridge tutorial method of one-to-one engagement. An endowed chair in church history at Fuller was established in his name in 1991.

== Death ==
Bromiley died in Santa Barbara, California, on 7 August 2009.

== Writings ==
- Baptism and the Anglican Reformers, 1953, Lutterworth Press.
- The Baptism of Infants, 1955, 1976 & 1977, Vine Books (Out of print, but now available online through the Church Society website)
- Sacramental Teaching and Practice in the Reformation Churches, 1957, Eerdmans.
- Children of Promise: The Case for Baptizing Infants, 1979, Eerdmans, ISBN 978-0-8028-1797-6
- God and Marriage, 1980, Eerdmans, ISBN 978-0-8028-1851-5
- Historical Theology: An Introduction, 2000, T & T Clark, ISBN 978-0-567-22357-9
- Introduction to the Theology of Karl Barth, 2000, T & T Clark, ISBN 978-0-567-29054-0

Bromiley also co-edited the English translation of Karl Barth's Church Dogmatics series with T. F. Torrance.

Bromiley was also a contributor to the fully revised edition of International Standard Bible Encyclopedia. Eerdmans. 1979. ISBN 0-8028-3781-6.
