= J. Stafford Wright =

British theologian (1905–1985)

John Stafford Wright (15 February 1905 in Bakewell – 27 August 1985 in Bristol) was an Anglican theologian.

J. Stafford Wright graduated from classics from Sidney Sussex College, Cambridge in 1927 and was one of the first students at Tyndale Hall, and in 1930 vice-principal. From 1945-1950 he was a senior tutor at Oak Hill College, London, then from 1951-1969 principal of Tyndale Hall. Among his staff were Philip Edgecumbe Hughes, and John Wenham. In 1967 he was made an honorary canon of Bristol Cathedral.

== Works ==
- The Date of Ezra's Coming to Jerusalem (Tyndale Old Testament Lecture, 1946)
- What is Man? a Christian assessment of the powers and functions of human personality. London: Paternoster Press, 1955
- Christianity and the Occult. London: Scripture Union, 1971
- Some Modern Religions. London: Tyndale Press, 1956 (with John Oswald Sanders)
- The Child's Right to Baptism. 1929; revised ed. London: Church Book Room Press, 1951
- The Authority of the Bible. London: Tyndale Press, 1946.

- "The Interpretation of Ecclesiastes" in Classical Evangelical Essays, ed. Walter C. Kaiser, Jr., (Grand Rapids: Baker, 1972), pp. 133–50
- Some Modern Faiths. London: Inter-Varsity Press, 1973 "An expanded and revised version of the booklet Some modern religions." (with Maurice C. Burrell)
- "Ecclesiastes" in Expositor's Bible Commentary, vol. 5, gen. ed. Frank E. Gaebelein. Zondervan, 1991.
- "Psalms" in The Bible Study Commentary
