= Charles Webster (priest) =

Dean of Ross, Ireland from 1926 to 1936

Charles Alexander Webster
- Dean of Ross
- Church: Church of Ireland
- Diocese: Ross
- In office: 1926–1936
- Previous posts: Curate in Nohoval; Incumbencies at Marmullane, Blackrock, Rathbarry; Prebendary of St Patrick's Cathedral, Dublin

Orders
- Ordination: 1891
- Education: Trinity College, Dublin

Charles Alexander Webster was Dean of Ross from 1926 to 1936.

Webster was educated at Trinity College, Dublin; and ordained in 1891. After a curacy in Nohoval he held he held incumbencies at Marmullane, Blackrock and Rathbarry. He was also a prebendary of St Patrick's Cathedral, Dublin.
