= William Griffith Thomas =

English Anglican cleric and scholar

The Reverend W. H. Griffith Thomas
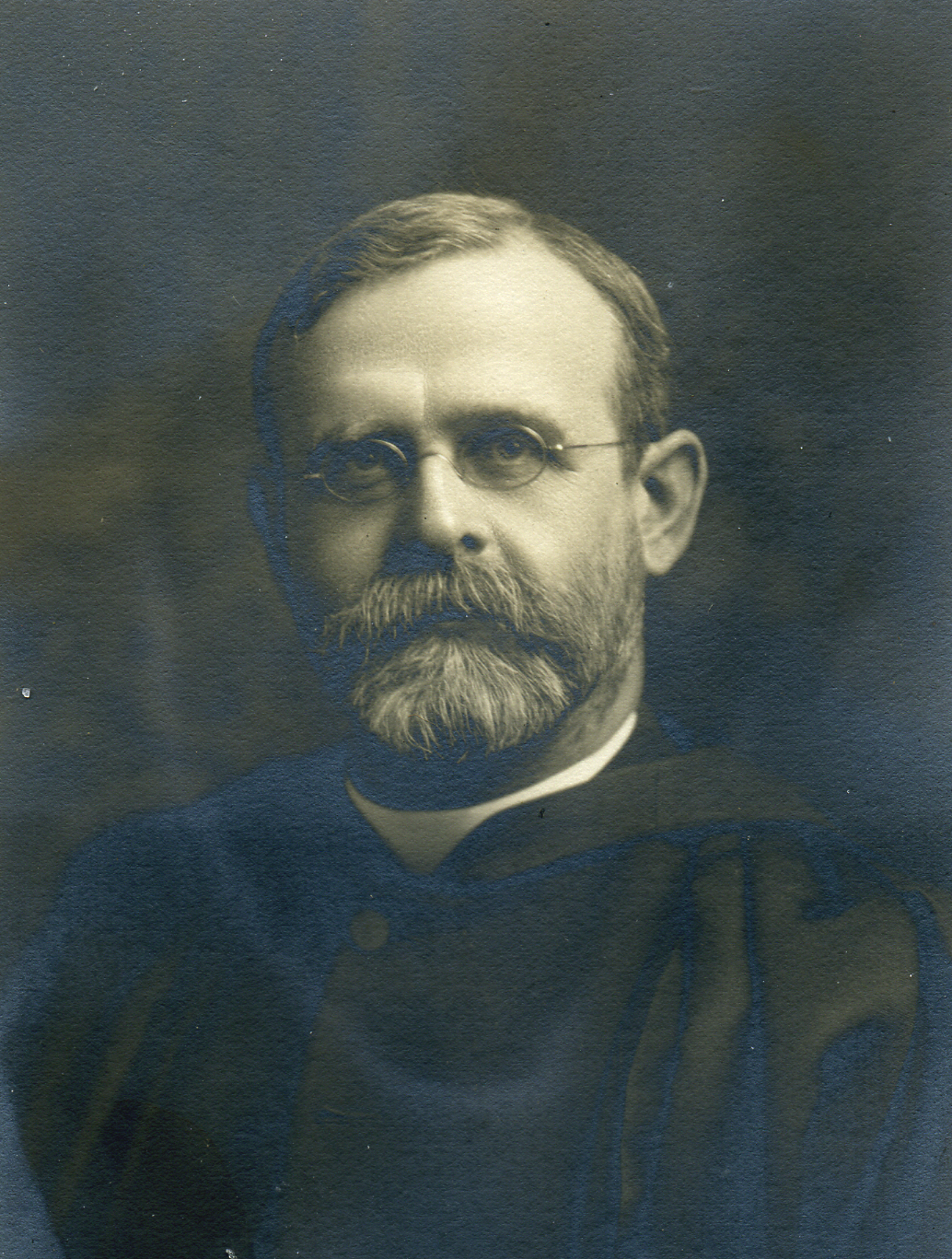
- Born: William Henry Griffith Thomas; 2 January 1861; Oswestry, Shropshire, England
- Died: 2 June 1924 (aged 63)
- Education: King's College London; Christ Church, Oxford

Ecclesiastical career
- Religion: Christianity
- Church: Church of England
- Ordained: 1885
- Writings: The Principles of Theology: an introduction to the Thirty-Nine Articles (1930)

William Henry Griffith Thomas (2 January 1861 – 2 June 1924) was an Anglican cleric and scholar from the English-Welsh border country. He has been quoted by theologian Alister McGrath in the science-versus-religion debate.

== Life and work ==
Griffith Thomas was born in Oswestry, Shropshire, England, to a Welsh family. According to the General Register Office marriage record for his parents, his mother (Anne Nightingale Griffith) was the daughter of William Griffith, a surgeon of Oswestry. She married William Thomas on August 30, 1860. William Thomas was a draper and the son of Thomas Thomas, a farmer. By the 1861 census, Mrs. Thomas was widowed and living in Oswestry with her parents and infant son. She married secondly, in 1864, Joseph Charles. In the 1871 census, the family was living in Shrewsbury, Shropshire. By the 1881 census, Griffith Thomas was living in London. Then 20 years old, he worked for his stepfather's younger brother, William Charles, who was a watch dial maker. From 1882-85 he was a student at King's College London where he took an Associateship of King's College, before proceeding to Christ Church, Oxford.

In addition to several pastorates, he taught for several years as Principal of Wycliffe Hall, Oxford (1905–1910) and then at Wycliffe College in Toronto, Ontario, Canada (1910–1919). He was a co-founder with Lewis Sperry Chafer of Dallas Theological Seminary. He authored several books including The Principles of Theology, a systematic theology text based on the 39 Articles of the Anglican Communion. Theologically conservative, Griffith Thomas was an Anglican and a dispensationalist. Whilst at Oxford he edited the theological magazine, the Churchman.

Gaining the reputation of a popular author and speaker in dispensationalism and victorious Christian life, he spent the last five years of his life writing and speaking at conservative gatherings. Partially funded by the Milton Stewart Evangelistic Fund, Thomas traveled with Charles G. Trumbull to Japan and China in the summer of 1920. In 1920 after returning to the United States from China, he made a sweeping accusation of the modernist tendency among China missionaries in the famous speech, "Modernism in China." The speech was delivered to the Presbyterian Social Union in Philadelphia in January 1921 and caused a great deal of debate among the churches and mission boards in North America. Thomas was accused of being directly responsible for the founding of the Bible Union of China. His reply was that "I had nothing to do with the formation of the Bible Union, except in so far as my address seems to have been the immediate occasion for it." There is certainly no evidence that Thomas personally initiated the Bible Union in China, but his speeches in China during summer missionaries retreat had the effect of significantly intensifying the conservatives' negative sentiment toward modernism in the field and prompting them to take public action.

== Legacy ==
More recently, Griffith Thomas has been quoted in the current science-versus-religion debate by the theologian Alister McGrath in his argument with the scientist Richard Dawkins over the issue of whether or not religious faith is based on evidence. According to McGrath, Griffith Thomas expressed a typical and characteristic Christian understanding of faith when he wrote:

...[Faith] affects the whole of man's nature. It commences with the conviction of the mind based on adequate evidence; it continues in the confidence of the heart or emotions based on [the above] conviction and it is crowned in the consent of the will, by means of which the conviction and confidence are expressed in conduct.

Griffith Thomas' view of "evidence" and "proof" in relation to the Bible, can be found in How We Got Our Bible and Why We Believe It Is God's Word.

== Works ==
- Must Christians sin? (nd)
- "Mending their nets" (nd)
- Grace: Thoughts for the Christian Year (nd)
- Priest or Prophet?: a question for the day (nd)
- Is Self-Examination a Christian Duty? (nd)
- What Did Our Lord Mean? Notes on the Holy Communion (nd)
- The Acts of the Apostles: outline studies in primitive Christianity (1880)
- The Apostle John: Studies in His Life and Writings (1881)
- "The power of Christ" (1894)
- Christianity Is Christ (1900)
- “A Sacrament of Our Redemption”: An Enquiry into the Meaning of the Lord’s Supper in the New Testament and the Church of England (1900)
- Evolution and the Supernatural (1900)
- The Catholic Faith. A manual of instruction for members of the Church of England. (1904)
- "Ich dien" = "I serve": a call for the New Year (1904?)
- The Apostle Peter: His Life and Writings (1904)
- The Catholic Faith. A manual of instruction for members of the Church of England (1904)
- Royal and Loyal: thoughts on the two-fold aspect of the Christian life (1905)
- Shall I go to Confession? (1906)
- Genesis: A Devotional Commentary (1907)
- The Training of Candidates for Holy Orders (1908)
- The Power of Peace (1908)
- Life Abiding and Abounding: Bible studies in prayer and meditation (1909)
- Hard to be Understood: Studies in Difficult Texts. Second series (1909)
- The Conflict of Ideals in the English Church (1910)
- The Work of the Ministry (1910)
- Life Abiding and Abounding: Bible Studies in Prayer and Meditation (1910)
- Methods of Bible Study (1911)
- Our Lord's Work in Heaven (1911)
- Romans (1911)
- The Holy Spirit of God (1913)
- The Prayers of St. Paul (1914)
- Strongholds of Truth (1914)
- An examination of Bishop Gore's open letter on "the basis of Anglican fellowship" (1914)
- Premillennialism : a reply to the Sunday School Journal (1916)
- The Grace of God: Two Studies in the Epistle to Titus (1916)
- Grace and Power: Some Aspects of the Spiritual Life (1916)
- How to Study the Gospel of Mark (1917)
- What Justification is and What it Does (1918)
- What about Evolution? (1918)
- The Christian Life and How to Live It (1919)
- The Catholic Faith: A Manual of Instruction for Members of the Church of England (1920)
- Modernism in China (1921)
- Books That Stand for the Faith: with suggestions as to ways in which Christian people may "contend earnestly" for their sacred trust (1922)
- Christ Pre-Eminent: Studies in the Epistle to the Colossians (1923)
- The Victorious Christ (1923)
- Let Us Go On (1923) Later titled Hebrews: A Devotional Commentary (1961)
- How to study the four Gospels (1924)
- Some Tests of Old Testament Criticism (1924)
- The Essentials of Life (1925)
- And God Spake These Words: How We Got Our Bible and Why We Believe it is God's Word (1926)
- The Principles of Theology: An Introduction to the Thirty-nine Articles (1930)
- Sermon outlines, exegetical and expository, (1947)
- Outline studies in the Gospel of St. Luke (1950)
- Through the Pentateuch chapter by chapter (1957)
- Outline studies in the Gospel of Matthew (1961)

== Notes ==
Academic offices
Preceded by	Principal of Wycliffe Hall, Oxford; 1905–1910	Succeeded by
