= J. C. Ryle =

Anglican bishop (1816–1900)

The Right Reverend J. C. Ryle
- Bishop of Liverpool
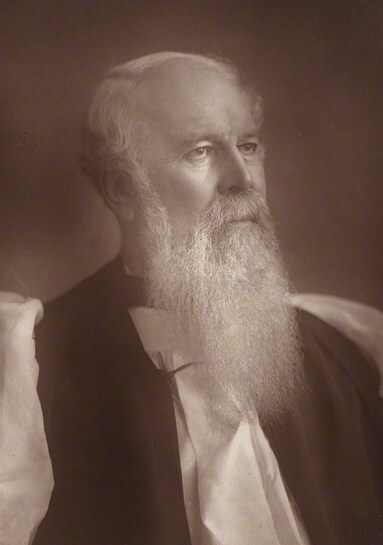
- Church: Church of England
- Diocese: Liverpool
- Installed: 19 April 1880
- Term ended: 1 March 1900
- Predecessor: Initial
- Successor: Francis Chavasse

Personal details
- Born: 10 May 1816 Macclesfield, England
- Died: 10 June 1900 (aged 84) Lowestoft, England

John Charles Ryle (10 May 1816 – 10 June 1900) was an English Anglican bishop, preacher, and writer in the evangelical and Calvinist traditions. He was the first Anglican bishop of Liverpool.

== Life ==
J.C. Ryle was born at Macclesfield, Cheshire on 10 May 1816, as the eldest son of an old and wealthy English family. His father was John Ryle of Park House, Macclesfield, a private banker and the M.P. for Macclesfield 1833–7. His mother, Susanna, was the daughter of Charles Hurt of Wirksworth, Derbyshire.

He was educated at Eton, where he excelled in rowing and cricket. From Eton, he entered the University of Oxford, where his career was unusually distinguished. He matriculated into Christ Church as a Fell Exhibitioner on 15 May 1834. He was Craven scholar in 1836, and was placed in the literæ humaniores in 1837.

In the winter of 1837, during his time at Oxford, Ryle experienced a religious conversion upon hearing Ephesians 2:8 ("For by grace you have been saved through faith. And this is not your own doing; it is the gift of God"). In a letter to his family, he wrote:

Nothing I can remember to this day appeared to me so clear and distinct as my own sinfulness, Christ's preciousness, the value of the Bible, the absolute necessity of coming out of the world, the need of being born again, and the enormous folly of the whole doctrine of baptismal regeneration. All these things seemed to flash upon me like a sunbeam, in the winter of 1837, and have stuck in my mind from that time down to this. People may account for such a change as they like, my own belief is that it is what the Bible calls conversion. Or, what the Bible calls regeneration. Before that time, I was dead in sins, and on the high road to hell. From that time, I had become alive, and have had a hope of heaven, and nothing to my mind can account for it but the free sovereign grace of God.

Ryle graduated B.A. from Oxford in 1838, intending not to enter the priesthood but to stand for Parliament at the first opportunity. He was unable to do so because of his father's bankruptcy. He took holy orders (1841–42) and became curate at Exbury, Hampshire. In 1843, he was preferred to the rectory of St Thomas, Winchester, which he exchanged in the following year for that of Helmingham, Suffolk. He retained the latter living until 1861, when he resigned it for the vicarage of Stradbroke in the same county. The restoration of Stradbroke church was due to his initiative. In 1869, he was made rural dean of Hoxne, and in 1872 honorary canon of Norwich.

Ryle also continued his theological education. He proceeded M.A. at Oxford in 1871, and was created D.D. by diploma on 4 May 1880.

Ryle was selected preacher at Cambridge in 1873 and the following year, at Oxford from 1874 to 1876, and in 1879 and the following year. In 1880, he was designated dean of Salisbury, and at once, 19 April, advanced to the newly created see of Liverpool, which he ably administered until his death at Lowestoft, Suffolk on 10 June 1900. He is buried at All Saints Church, Childwall, Liverpool.

== Family ==
Ryle married three times. His first two wives died young. His first marriage was on 29 October 1845, to Matilda Charlotte Louisa, daughter of John Pemberton Plumptre, of Fredville, Kent. His second, in March 1850, was to Jessy Elizabeth Walker, daughter of John Walker of Crawfordton, Dumfriesshire, and sister of George Gustavus Walker. His third marriage, on 24 October 1861, was to Henrietta Clowes, daughter of Lieutenant-Colonel William Legh Clowes of Broughton Old Hall, Lancashire, and sister of Samuel Clowes. Ryle had a daughter by his first wife, and three sons and a daughter by his second wife Jessy. His second son Herbert Edward Ryle, also an Anglican clergyman, became successively bishop of Exeter, bishop of Winchester, and dean of Westminster. Through his son Reginald, J.C. Ryle was the grandfather of the philosopher Gilbert Ryle.

== Legacy ==
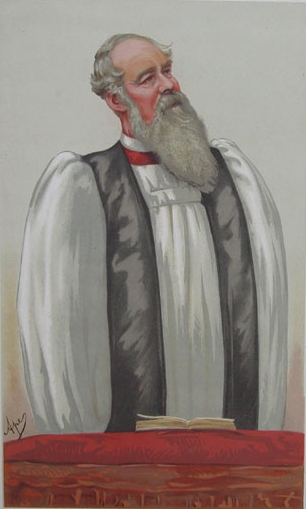
John Charles Ryle, by Carlo Pellegrini, 1881.

Ryle was a strong supporter of the evangelical school and a critic of ritualism. He was a writer, pastor and an evangelical preacher. Among his longer works are Christian Leaders of the Eighteenth Century (1869), Expository Thoughts on the Gospels (7 volumes, 1856–69), and Principles for Churchmen (1884). Ryle was described as having a commanding presence and vigorous in advocating his principles, yet having a warm disposition. He was also credited with having success in evangelizing the blue collar community.

== Published works ==
- The Cross: A Call to the Fundamentals of Religion (1852)
- Expository Thoughts on Matthew (HTM, LibriVox audio)
- Expository Thoughts on Mark (HTM, LibriVox audio)
- Expository Thoughts on Luke (HTM), Vol. 1, Vol. 2, LibriVox audio: Vol. 1, Vol. 2
- Expository Thoughts on John (HTM) Vol. 1, Vol. 2, Vol. 3, LibriVox audio: Vol. 1, Vol. 2, Vol. 3
- Coming Events And Present Duties, and Prophecy (1867) Now published as Are You Ready for the End of Time?
- Shall We Know One Another (1870)
- Knots Untied (1877)
- Holiness: Its Nature, Hindrances, Difficulties and Roots (1877, enlarged 1879) (HTM)
- Practical Religion: Being Plain Papers on the Daily Duties, Experience, Dangers, and Privileges of Professing Christians (1878)
- Higher Criticism: Some Thoughts on Modern Theories about the Old Testament (1880)
- Simplicity in Preaching (1882)
- Upper Room: Being a Few Truths for the Times (1887)
- The Duties of Parents (1888)
- From Old Times: or Protestant Facts And Men (1890) (partially reprinted as Five English Reformers)
- Bible Inspiration: Its Reality And Nature (1877)
- Christian Leaders of the Last Century (1873)
- Tracts and Other Works

Independently published:

- Warnings to the Churches (1967)
