= Dean of Ross, Ireland =

Church of Ireland official

The Dean of Ross is based at the Cathedral Church of St. Fachtna in Rosscarbery in the Diocese of Ross within the united bishopric of Cork, Cloyne and Ross of the Church of Ireland.

The incumbent is Cliff Jeffers.

== List of deans (Church of Ireland; incomplete) ==
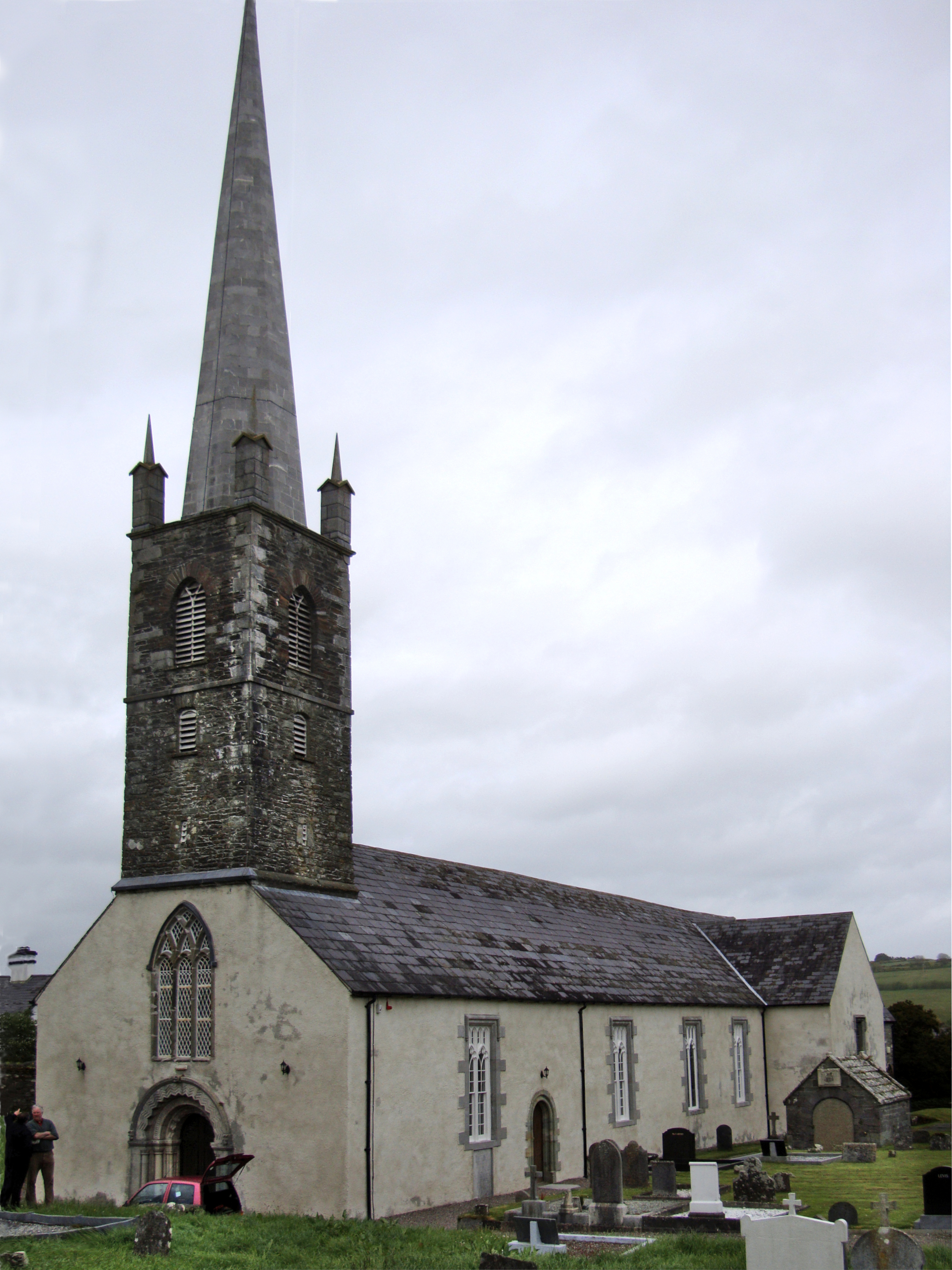
St Fachtna's Cathedral, Rosscarbery

- 1591 Robert Sturton
- 1615–1630 Hugh Persevall
- 1630/1 William Bolton
- 1637–1639 George Horley or Horsey
- 1639 John Chappel
- 1639–1661 Mark Pagett
- 1663/4 John Everleigh
- 1678/9-1710 Rowland Davies
- 1710–1717 Richard Griffith
- 1717–1732 Valentine French
- 1733–1743 Jemmett Browne (afterwards Bishop of Killaloe, 1743)
- 1743–1772 Arthur St George
- 1772–1813 Wensley Bond
- 1813–1829 James Forward Bond
- 1830–1876 James Stannus
- 1876–?1905 Isaac Morgan Reeves (died 1905)
- c.1907–1914 John Halahan (died 1920)
- 1914–>1925 Harry Becher (died 1929)
- c.1933 Charles Webster
- <1954–>1965 Raymond Beresford-Poer (died 1983)
- 1968–1978 Arthur Gordon
- John Fleming
- 1995–1998 Richard Henderson (afterwards Bishop of Tuam, Killala and Achonry, 1998)
- 1998–2021 Christopher Peters
- 2022–present Cliff Jeffers
