= Robert B. Strimple =

American theologian (1935 – 2024)

Robert Benson Strimple (18 April 1935 – 17 November 2024) was an American theologian. He served as president of Westminster Seminary California from 1982 to 1988.

== Life and career ==
Strimple was born in New Castle, Delaware and studied at the University of Delaware and Westminster Theological Seminary. He taught at Toronto Bible College and WTS, before becoming the founding President of WSC. He was ordained as a minister in the Orthodox Presbyterian Church in 1970.

Strimple contributed to Three Views on the Millennium and Beyond (Zondervan, 1999), arguing for amillennialism.

In 2004, a Festschrift was published in his honor. The Pattern of Sound Doctrine: Systematic Theology at the Westminster Seminaries included contributions from Jay E. Adams, R. Scott Clark, Ed Clowney, John Frame, Richard Gaffin, W. Robert Godfrey, D. G. Hart, Michael Horton, and David VanDrunen.

VanDrunen argues that Strimple's "most significant accomplishment" was his article on Philippians 2, and that in this way he followed John Murray in practising systematic theology with a "distinctively exegetical bent". Strimple died on 17 November 2024, at the age of 89.
