= Cambridge Declaration =

Statement of faith written in 1996

The Cambridge Declaration is a statement of faith written in 1996 by the Alliance of Confessing Evangelicals, a group of Reformed and Lutheran Evangelicals who were concerned with the state of the Evangelical movement in America and throughout the world.

== Beginnings ==
=== "No Place for Truth" ===
Both the conference and the eventual declaration came about as a result of David F. Wells' 1993 book No Place for Truth or Whatever Happened to Evangelical Theology? (ISBN 0-8028-0747-X). The book was highly critical of the Evangelical church in America for abandoning its historical and theological roots and instead embracing the philosophies and the pragmatism of the world.

While not a best seller, the book was critically acclaimed by a number of important Evangelical leaders. In 1994, a number of thosse leaders formed the Alliance of Confessing Evangelicals. Since much of Wells' thesis stemmed from the modern church's abandonment of historical confessions of faith (such as The Westminster Confession and the 1689 Baptist Confession of Faith), the Alliance was based upon Evangelicals who not only adhered to these Reformed confessions of faith, but were able to direct their ministries accordingly.

The two principal players involved in spearheading the conference from which the Cambridge Declaration emerged were James Montgomery Boice of Evangelical Ministries (Philadelphia, Pennsylvania), and Dr. Michael S. Horton of Christians United for Reformation (Anaheim, California). Like Wells, Horton and Boice were both strong critics of the shallow nature of contemporary Evangelicalism, and had published a book to that effect. Later in 1996, those men joined forces by merging their respective organizations into The Alliance of Confessing Evangelicals.

=== Conference in Cambridge ===
Eventually a conference was held between April 17–20, 1996 in Cambridge, Massachusetts. The choice of location was deliberate, since Cambridge was the seat of Harvard University and thus the center of ecclesiastical and intellectual life in 17th century America. Cambridge was also the location of The Cambridge Platform, a declaration of church polity made in 1648 by New England Puritans.

Approximately 100 delegates from around the world gathered for the four-day conference, with the explicit intention of creating an official declaration that would be released once the conference concluded. The conference was also important because it included the presence of evangelical Lutherans, who had traditionally kept themselves apart from mainline Evangelical and Reformed movements.

Throughout the conference, a document was drafted, and suggestions and changes were solicited from the delegates. The two principal authors of the Cambridge Declaration, however, were Dr. David F. Wells, and Dr. Michael S. Horton. The papers delivered at the conference were later edited and published in the book Here We Stand (Baker Books), edited by James Montgomery Boice and Ben Sasse (republished in 2004).

== Reasons for Declaration ==
The conference and the eventual declaration that was created were broadly influenced by the following:

- The culture of the modern world (as represented by Postmodernism) is changing the message that the church preaches.
- The erosion of Christian doctrine within the modern church, including the lack of expository preaching.
- The increasing influence of Relativism within the church, which has led to an environment where "truth" is subjectively determined, and where church leaders aim to preach only "positive" messages.
- The increasing focus upon man, rather than God, within the church.
- An increasing focus on man's ability to respond to God's grace, rather than a focus upon God's ability to save man.
- A focus on the quantitative and measurable aspects of church growth (which thus links Christian ministry with outward success) rather than the qualitative and spiritual aspects of Biblical ministry.

== Content of the Declaration ==
The declaration is a call to repentance for the evangelical church in order to reaffirm the historical Christian truths that are articulated by The Five solas and deny modern teachings:

1. Sola Scriptura: The Erosion of Authority

- A reaffirmation that the Bible contains all things necessary to understand and obey God.
- A denial that any other form of authority is needed to bind the conscience of the Christian.

2. Solus Christus: The Erosion of Christ-Centered Faith

- A reaffirmation that Christ alone and his penal substitutionary atonement on the cross are the means by which all Christians are saved.
- A denial that the Gospel can be preached without the atonement being declared and without faith being solicited from the listeners.

3. Sola Gratia: The Erosion of The Gospel

- A reaffirmation that salvation is a supernatural work of the Holy Spirit.
- A denial that salvation is in any sense a work of the human heart, either fully or partially.

4. Sola Fide: The Erosion Of The Chief Article

- A reaffirmation that a person is justified (declared innocent) before God through faith alone and through Christ alone – that Christ's righteousness is imputed to the Christian.
- A denial that justification relies upon any human merit, and that churches which teach this cannot be considered legitimate churches.

5. Soli Deo Gloria: The Erosion of God-Centered Worship

- A reaffirmation that salvation is ultimately for God's glory rather than man's, and that Christians everywhere should understand that they are under God's authority and act for his glory alone.
- A denial that God can be glorified through "entertainment"-style worship; the removal of law and/or gospel in preaching; and preaching that focuses upon self-improvement, self-esteem and self fulfillment.

== Attitudes towards the Roman Catholic Church ==
The declaration reflects traditional conservative Protestantism in its rejection of the Roman Catholic Church as a legitimate church. This is mainly due to the differences expressed over the issue of Justification. These rejections of the Roman Catholic Church are found implicitly and explicitly in the text of the Declaration:

- In Thesis one (Sola Scriptura), the text asserts We deny that any creed, council or individual may bind a Christian's conscience. While this has a universal application, it is specifically aimed at the Roman Catholic Church and its insistence that Scripture is to be interpreted by the church's institutions and historical councils, and of the Pope's authority.
- In Thesis four (Sola Fide), the text asserts We deny that justification rests on any merit to be found in us, or upon the grounds of an infusion of Christ's righteousness in us, or that an institution claiming to be a church that denies or condemns sola fide can be recognized as a legitimate church. It is this last phrase that indicates a rejection of the Roman Catholic Church, since it is clearly an "institution" that "denies or condemns" the Reformation understanding of Sola Fide.
- In the section Call To Repentance And Reformation, the following point is made: We also earnestly call back erring professing evangelicals who have deviated from God's Word in the matters discussed in this Declaration. This includes those... who claim that evangelicals and Roman Catholics are one in Jesus Christ even where the biblical doctrine of justification is not believed. This is an explicit reference to the issue discussed in Thesis four.

== Criticisms of Charismatic and Pentecostal Christianity ==
The declaration also contains many statements that were intended to criticize the influence and theology of the modern Charismatic movement, along with the continual influence of the historic Pentecostal movement:

- In Thesis one (Sola Scriptura), the text asserts We deny that... the Holy Spirit speaks independently of or contrary to what is set forth in the Bible, or that personal spiritual experience can ever be a vehicle of revelation. In seeking to declare that Scripture is the sole source of the Spirit's revelatory work, the declaration is at odds with the entire Charismatic and Pentecostal movement with this statement. Private and personal revelation – outside the work of the Bible – is of critical importance to Christians in this movement. Essentially, the declaration calls upon these Christians to stop seeking private revelation and seek guidance from the Bible only.
- In Thesis two (Solus Christus), the text asserts We deny that the gospel is preached if Christ's substitutionary work is not declared and faith in Christ and his work is not solicited. This is a criticism of the practice of calling for people to "make a decision" through various means without actually preaching the Gospel. In many cases, when people are asked to "come forward" in these churches, it has come at the end of a sermon which may be emotionally charged, but which has not explained the Gospel as represented by the Atonement.
- In Thesis three (Sola Gratia), it states We deny that salvation is in any sense a human work. Human methods, techniques or strategies by themselves cannot accomplish this transformation. Faith is not produced by our unregenerated human nature. This section is a specific reference to the influence of revivalism in American Christianity – especially in the influence of historical preachers such as Charles Grandison Finney (especially in the last phrase). It asserts that emotionally manipulative techniques that exist within Charismatic and Pentecostal churches are not necessarily evidence of the work of the Holy Spirit. Moreover, the existence of these emotionally charged atmospheres within a church is certainly not a guarantee that people who have "been saved" in this environment have, in fact, been truly regenerated by the Holy Spirit.
- In Thesis five (Soli Deo Gloria), it states We deny that we can properly glorify God if our worship is confused with entertainment, if we neglect either Law or Gospel in our preaching, or if self-improvement, self-esteem or self-fulfillment are allowed to become alternatives to the gospel. Considering the fact that many Charismatic and Pentecostal churches have entertaining worship services, and that the focus of preaching is not necessarily an exposition of the Bible but a positive message of self-fulfillment, this part of the Declaration is also evidence of a critical attitude towards this section of the Christian church.

== Purposes of the declaration, according to participants ==
- In 1994 Dr. James M. Boice called a number of us together in Philadelphia to discuss the possibilities of forming an alliance. Although many of us were already engaged in this sort of work in some fashion, Gordon-Conwell Seminary professor David F. Wells' book, No Place for Truth, Or Whatever Happened to Evangelical Theology? had just appeared and helped to organize us around a common concern. We came to seek God's wisdom together as to how we should proceed…

—Michael S. Horton

- If we evaluate the pragmatism of the pragmatists on a pragmatic basis, we have to say that by their own standards they have failed. Why don't American medical statistics reflect the healings of the charismatics? Why don't our crime statistics reflect the holy living of evangelicals? Why, after a generation of church growth methodology and user-friendly worship, is church attendance down significantly?

— Robert Godfrey: One of the framers and a member of the United Reformed Church.

- This is a somber matter; we are repeating on the evangelical side the very attitudes which led to the birth of liberalism. The irony is that the very things which led to the liberalism which has been the great enemy of evangelicalism early on in this century have been taken into the evangelical churches. We are fools if we think that what happened in liberalism will not happen in evangelicalism too unless we repent and recover the gospel.

— David F. Wells: One of the framers and a member of the Congregational church.

- What lies ahead of evangelicalism if it does not correct its path is it is going to give birth to a new liberalism. If (the alliance of Confessing Evangelicals – the framers of the Cambridge Declaration) is effective, on the other hand, it is going to give birth to a new focussed resurgence of reformational Christianity. These two paths will become the alternatives between which people are going to have to choose.

— David F. Wells

- Luther's theology of the cross totally destroys the modern gospel of success. It's in Calvin too, but a lot of people don't realize that.

— Dr. G. Edward Veith: One of the framers and a member of the Lutheran church.

- Worship should not be confused with feelings. It is true that the worship of God will affect us, and one thing it will frequently affect is our emotions. At times tears will fill our eyes as we become aware of God's great love and grace toward us. Yet it is possible for our eyes to fill with tears and for there still to be no real worship simply because we have not come to a genuine awareness of God and a fuller praise of Himself in His nature and ways… True worship occurs only when that part of man, his spirit, which is akin to the divine nature (for God is spirit), actually meets with God and finds itself praising God for His love, wisdom, beauty, truth, holiness, compassion, mercy, grace, power, and all His other attributes.

— James M. Boice: One of the framers and member of the Presbyterian Church.

== 1996 signatories ==
- Dr. John Armstrong (theologian)
- Alistair Begg
- Dr. Dr. James M. Boice
- Dr. W. Robert Godfrey
- Dr. John D. Hannah
- Dr. Michael S. Horton
- Mrs. Rosemary Jensen
- Dr. R. Albert Mohler Jr.
- Dr. John F. MacArthur, Jr.
- Dr. Robert M. Norris
- Dr. R. C. Sproul
- Dr. Gene Edward Veith, Jr.
- Dr. David F. Wells
- Dr. Luder Whitlock
- Dr. J. A. O. Preus III
