= Keith Mathison =

American theologian (born 1967)

Keith A. Mathison (born 1967) is an American Reformed theologian.

Mathison grew up near Houston, Texas. He began graduate studies at Dallas Theological Seminary before transferring to Reformed Theological Seminary, Orlando. After completing his M.A. at RTS, he began working at Ligonier Ministries, where he served as an associate editor of the Reformation Study Bible. He obtained a Ph.D. from Whitefield Theological Seminary and currently serves as professor of systematic theology at Reformation Bible College in Sanford, Florida.

In The Shape of Sola Scriptura (2001), Mathison uses the term "solo Scriptura" to describe the view that the Bible is the only authority for Christians. Mathison himself advocates for a "communitarian sola Scriptura" view in which "the true interpretation of Scripture is found only in the Church".

In Given for You: Reclaiming Calvin's Doctrine of the Lord's Supper (2002), Mathison coins the word "suprasubstantiation" (in distinction to transubstantiation or consubstantiation) to describe Calvin’s doctrine of the Lord's Supper. He also advocates for the use of wine in the Lord's Supper.

== Works ==
- Dispensationalism: Rightly Dividing the People of God? (1995)
- Postmillennialism: An Eschatology of Hope (1999)
- The Shape of Sola Scriptura (2001)
- Given for You: Reclaiming Calvin's Doctrine of the Lord's Supper (2002)
- A Reformed Approach to Science and Scripture (2013)
- From Age to Age: The Unfolding of Biblical Eschatology (2014)
- The Lord's Supper (2019)
