= R. Scott Clark =

American pastor and academic (born 1961)

- Born: Robert Scott Clark; June 18, 1961 (age 65)
- Education: Master of Divinity, DPhil (Oxon)
- Occupations: Seminary professor, pastor, author
- Employer: Westminster Seminary California

Robert Scott Clark (born 1961) is an American Reformed pastor and seminary professor. He is the author of several books, including his most recent work, Recovering the Reformed Confession.

== Biography ==
Clark came to Christ in a Southern Baptist Church in the mid-1970s and made a profession of faith in the 1980s at St John's Reformed Church in Lincoln, Nebraska. He earned a B.A. from the University of Nebraska–Lincoln, Master of Divinity from Westminster Seminary California, and D.Phil. from the University of Oxford. Since 1997 he has been teaching at Westminster Seminary California, where he served as academic dean from 1997 to 2001; currently he is professor of church history and historical theology. He has also taught at Wheaton College (Illinois), Reformed Theological Seminary, Jackson, and Concordia University, Irvine. He is an ordained minister in the United Reformed Churches in North America. He maintains an online journal entitled the Heidelblog, which was deleted for a time in 2011, but is now in regular production. Clark also hosts the Heidelcast podcast where he discusses various topics relevant to reformed theology.

In 2026, a Festschrift was published in his honor. Remembering the Reformed Confession: Essays on Theology, Piety, and Practice Honoring R. Scott Clark upon His Retirement from Westminster Seminary California included contributions from W. Robert Godfrey, D. G. Hart, and Michael Horton.

== Views ==
Scott Clark has defended the Marrow Brethren.

Clark states in his own article that Baptists shouldn't be called either Reformed or Calvinist by Reformed Paedobaptists.

== Works ==
=== Author ===
- Recovering the Reformed Confession: Our Theology, Piety, and Practice (Phillipsburg: P&R Publishing, 2008, ISBN 1 59638110 8)
- Caspar Olevian and the Substance of the Covenant: The Double Benefit of Christ (Edinburgh: Rutherford House, December 2005,ISBN 978 1 60178053 9)

=== Editor and contributor ===
- William Ames, 2008, A Sketch of the Christian's Catechism. Trans., Todd M. Rester. Classic Reformed Theology vol. 1. Grand Rapids: Reformation Heritage Press. ISBN 978-1-60178-045-4.
- Caspar Olevianus, 2009, An Exposition of the Apostles' Creed. Trans. Lyle D. Bierma. Classic Reformed Theology vol. 2. Grand Rapids: Reformation Heritage Press. ISBN 978 1 60178074 4.
- Covenant, Justification, and Pastoral Ministry: Essays by the Faculty of Westminster Seminary California. ed. R. Scott Clark, 2007 Phillipsburg, NJ: P&R Pub. ISBN 1 59638035 7.
- Protestant Scholasticism: Essays in Reassessment, ed., Carl Trueman and R. Scott Clark, 1999. Carlisle, UK: Paternoster. (ISBN 1 59752788 2)
- Always Reformed: Essays in Honor of W. Robert Godfrey. ed., R. Scott Clark and Joel E. Kim, 2010. Escondido, CA: Westminster Seminary California. (ISBN 978 0 98288050 0)

=== Contributor ===
- "Calvin: A Negative Boundary Marker In American Lutheran Self-Identity, 1871–1934", in Johan de Niet, Herman Paul and Bart Wallet, ed, 2009. Sober, Strict, and Scriptural: Collective Memories of John Calvin, 1800–2000. Brill, ISBN 978 900417424 5.
- "The Benefits of Christ: Double Justification in Protestant Theology before the Westminster Assembly" in Anthony T. Selvaggio, ed, 2007. The Faith Once Delivered: Essays in Honor of Dr. Wayne R. Spear (Phillipsburg: P&R Publishing), 107–34, ISBN 1 59638020 9.
- "Election and Predestination: Sovereign Expressions of God", in David Hall and Peter Lillback, ed, 2008. A Theological Guide to Calvin’s Institutes: Essays and Analysis (Phillipsburg: P&R Publishing) ISBN 1 59638091 8
- "Whosever Will Be Saved: Emerging Church? Meet Christian Dogma", in Gary Johnson ed., 2008, Reforming or Conforming: Post-Conservative Evangelicals and the Emerging Church (Wheaton: Crossway) ISBN 1 43350118 X)
- "Reconstructionism", in The New Dictionary of Christian Apologetics, eds Campbell Campbell-Jack, Gavin J. McGrath (Leicester: Inter-Varsity Press), ISBN 0 83082451 0.
- "Janus, the Well-Meant Offer of the Gospel and Westminster Theology", in David VanDrunen, ed., The Pattern of Sound Words: A Festschrift for Robert B. Strimple (Phillipsburg: P&R Publishing, 2004), 149–80. (ISBN 0 87552717 5)
- [with Joel R. Beeke], "Ursinus, Oxford and the Westminster Divines", in The Westminster Confession into the 21st Century: Essays in Remembrance of the 350th Anniversary of the Publication of the Westminster Confession of Faith, 3 vol. ed. Ligon Duncan (Ross-Shire, Scotland: Mentor, 2003), 2. 1–32. (ISBN 1 85792862 8)
- "The Authority of Reason in the Later Reformation: Scholasticism in Caspar Olevian and Antoine de La Faye", in Protestant Scholasticism: Essays in Reassessment, ed., Carl Trueman and R. Scott Clark (Carlisle, UK: Paternoster, 1999), 111–26. (ISBN 1 59752788 2)
- "Calvin as Negative Boundary Marker in American Lutheran Self-Identity", in Johan de Niet, Herman Paul, and Bart Wallet, ed., The Modern Calvin: John Calvin in Nineteenth- and Twentieth-Century Memory Cultures (Leiden: Brill, 2009).
- "The Evangelical Fall from the Means of Grace", in The Compromised Church, ed. John Armstrong (Wheaton: Crossway, 1998), 133–47. (ISBN 1 58134006 0)

=== Journal articles ===
- Iustitia Imputata Christi: Alien or Proper to Luther’s Doctrine of Justification? Concordia Theological Quarterly 70 (2006): 269–310.
- Baptism and the Benefits of Christ: The Double Mode of Communion in the Covenant of Grace, The Confessional Presbyterian Journal 2 (2006): 3–19.
- The Catholic-Calvinist Trinitarianism of Caspar Olevian, Westminster Theological Journal 61 (1999): 15–39.
- Calvin and the Lex Naturalis, Stulos Theological Journal 6 (1998): 1–22.
