= Reformation Study Bible =

Bible published by Ligonier Ministries

- ESV Reformation Study Bible (Hardcover, White)
- Language: English
- Genre: Christian literature
- Publisher: Reformation Trust Publishing; HarperCollins (New King James Version)
- Publication date: March 16, 2015
- Publication place: United States
- Pages: 2,538
- ISBN: 1-56769-440-3
- Website: reformationstudybible.com

The Reformation Study Bible (previously published as the New Geneva Study Bible) is a study Bible published by Ligonier Ministries. The Reformation Study Bible "aims to carry on the legacy of the Geneva Bible in shining forth the light of biblical Christianity, which was recovered in the Reformation." As of late 2021, all editions of the Reformation Study Bible feature the Bible text of the English Standard Version (ESV).

== History ==
Starting in 1989, R. C. Sproul assembled a team of contributors to work on a study Bible edition that would follow a distinctively Reformed perspective. In 1995, Thomas Nelson (now HarperCollins) published the New Geneva Study Bible (featuring the Bible text of the New King James Version); the name of the edition was changed to Reformation Study Bible in 1998.

In 2005, Ligonier Ministries self-published a minor revision to the Reformation Study Bible, now using the Bible text of the English Standard Version.

In 2015, a fully revised version of the Reformation Study Bible was released. The notes were expanded into a three column format and the theological and doctrinal content was updated. An additional resource was added to the back of this Bible that contains the Creeds, Catechisms and Doctrinal documents that are common to Reformed fellowships.

In February 2016, due to popular demand, Reformation Trust released editions of the Reformation Study Bible featuring the text of the New King James Version. Reformation Trust lists R. C. Sproul, James M. Boice, Edmund Clowney, Sean Michael Lucas, Keith A. Mathison, L. Michael Morales, Stephen J. Nichols, Roger Nicole, J.I. Packer, Burk Parsons, et al. as primary editors of the 2015/2016 editions of the Reformation Study Bible.

In late 2021, Reformation Trust retired use of the NKJV, fully adopting the ESV as its Bible text of choice.
