= The Shape of Sola Scriptura =

- Author: Keith Mathison
- Language: English
- Subject: Christianity; Protestant Reformation; Sola Scriptura
- Genre: Non-Fiction
- Publisher: Canon Press
- Publication date: 1 April 2001
- Pages: 366
- ISBN: 978-1-885767-74-5

The Shape of Sola Scriptura is a 2001 book by Reformed Christian theologian Keith Mathison. Mathison traces the development of sola scriptura from the early church to the present. Matthison, a Reformed theologian at Ligonier Ministries and Whitefield Theological Seminary, views the Protestant Reformation as a time of recovery of the doctrine that had been under assault from the fourth century. He argues that relativism and individualism permeate present-day teaching on the subject, and that widespread misunderstanding of the doctrine of sola scriptura has been eroding the church from within. This, in Mathison's view, has led to conversions from Protestantism to other religions, and has undermined the relationship among Scripture, church tradition, and individual believers as set forth by the early church and restated by the Magisterial Reformers.

A Presbyterian (PCA) reviewer wrote that the book "points to the importance of covenant communities — the organized church — and away from an individualized interpretation of Scripture." A Latin Rite Roman Catholic reviewer objected to Matthison's book in detail. In summary, he wrote "Sola scriptura enthrones one’s own personal interpretation of the bible and dethrones the proper authority, the Church." Another Catholic reviewer wrote that "many Protestants and Catholics alike believe [it] to be the best recent defense of sola Scriptura."

== The Four "Traditions" ==
Mathison uses historical data and factual analyses to better explain the actual meaning of sola scriptura. In his book, Mathison builds upon historian Heiko Oberman's illustrations talking about four types of traditions that were formed

1. "Tradition I" - espoused sole, one-source revelation (Scripture alone); Mathison argues that this was the position taken by the Magisterial Reformers who wanted to take the position of the early Church; they believed that the Canon was compiled by the early Church to prevent its tradition from meandering from orthodoxy; Canon is to be final infallible authority; "although Scripture is the sole infalliable authority, it must be interpreted by the Church within the boundaries of the ancient rule of faith or regula fidei" (Mathison 147); tradition is in subordination to Scripture and it must coincide with Scripture (e.g. the Ecumenical Creeds).

2. "Tradition II" - espoused two-source revelation—Scripture and Tradition—which was dogmatized in the Council of Trent in the 15th Century (one that allows for an extra-scriptural revelation as equally authoritative as Scripture itself); Mathison posits that this was the position of Tridentine (Roman) Catholicism.

3. "Tradition III" - Scripture and Tradition are interpreted by the Magisterium with the dogma of papal infallibility from Vatican I (1870); known as "sola ekklesia"; Mathison asserts that this is the position of modern-day Roman Catholicism.

4. "Tradition 0" Nuda Scriptura - position taken by Radical Reformers and many modern-day evangelicals, stripping all ecumenical creeds and church heritage and history to follow Bible only; termed in Mathison's book as "solo scriptura"; Mathison notes that this position can be sometimes mistaken by being linked with Tradition I.

Tradition I was one of two views in the Church and the Magisterial Reformers argued for Tradition I during the Reformation. The Magisterial Reformers' phrase for Tradition I was Sola Scriptura. The Reformation, according to K.A. Mathison, was actually a battle of Tradition I vs. Tradition II, not Scripture vs. Tradition (as it is commonly believed today).

Tradition II was really developed in the twelfth century and is used to justify Roman Catholic doctrines such as papal infallibility, Mary's assumption and other unique doctrines found nowhere in Scripture or the writings of the early Church Fathers. Tradition II argues that there exists apostolic revelation that was not written in the Scriptures, but passed down in the Church, which is also equivalent with Scripture.

Tradition III is the newer Roman Catholic view that practices and demonstrates that the real source of revelation is neither Scripture nor tradition but instead is the living magisterium. Whatever Rome says today is the apostolic faith. This has taken over its predecessor, Tradition II. Theoretically speaking, there are now three authorities: Magisterium, Tradition, and Scripture; in practice, however, it is the Magisterium that interprets both Scripture and Tradition for its adherents.

Tradition 0 (Nuda Scriptura) is the view of most "evangelical", fundamentalist and non-denominational churches. This view is called "solo scriptura" to distinguish it from Tradition I (sola scriptura). This view rejects the ancient creeds and any concept of tradition. The Bible is the only source of authority and is interpreted by each individual. Tradition 0 is responsible for the multitude of churches and denominations in the United States.

Keith Mathison argues that when the debates of "Scripture vs. Tradition" occur, it is actually Tradition 0 vs. Tradition III/Tradition II. Mathison also explains that with the lack of understanding of the meaning of sola scriptura, misunderstanding of equating Tradition 0 and Tradition I as akin could happen. He also explains that lack of historical understanding could mislead adherents of Tradition 0 to believe that they are descendants of the Magisterial Reformers who espoused Tradition I.
