= Van Drunen =

Van Drunen or VanDrunen is a surname. Notable people with the surname include:

- David M. VanDrunen (born 1971), American theologian
- David Van Drunen (born 1976), Canadian ice hockey player
- Martin van Drunen (born 1966), Dutch heavy metal musician and singer
