= David F. Wells =

Rhodesian-American theologian, author and academic

- Born: David Falconer Wells; May 11, 1939 (age 87); Bulawayo, Southern Rhodesia
- Occupations: Professor, Author, Theologian
- Title: Distinguished Senior Research Professor at Gordon-Conwell Theological Seminary
- Spouse: Jane

Academic background
- Education: University of Cape Town; University of London (B.D.); Trinity Evangelical Divinity School (Th.M.)
- Alma mater: Manchester University (Ph.D.)
- Thesis: A Re-Examination of George Tyrrell's Theology in Relation to the Programme for Renewal Enunciated in the Documents Issued by the Second Vatican Council (1969)
- Doctoral advisor: Hubert Cunliffe-Jones

Academic work
- Era: 20th and 21st Century
- Discipline: Biblical research
- Institutions: Gordon-Conwell Theological Seminary
- Main interests: Theology, Culture, Postmodernism, Evangelicalism
- Notable works: No Place for Truth, or Whatever Happened to Evangelical Theology?

David Falconer Wells (born May 11, 1939) is Distinguished Senior Research Professor at Gordon-Conwell Theological Seminary. He is the author of several books in which his evangelical theology engages with the modern world. He has taught at Trinity Evangelical Divinity School and has served as the Academic Dean at Gordon-Conwell Theological Seminary's Charlotte, North Carolina campus.

Wells completed his undergraduate studies at the University of Cape Town, in South Africa, before going on to study divinity at the University of London and graduating with a Bachelor of Divinity in 1966. He completed advanced graduate studies at Trinity Evangelical Divinity School graduating with a Master of Theology, summa cum laude in 1967. While at Trinity, he completed the thesis "Decretum Dei Speciale: An Examination of the Content and Significance of Calvin's Doctrine of Soteriological Predestination." He completed his Ph.D. from Manchester University (England) under the direction of Hubert Cunliffe-Jones and afterwards was appointed as a post-doctoral Research Fellow at Yale Divinity School. Wells is a Council member of the Alliance of Confessing Evangelicals. He also serves on the board of the Rafiki Foundation and as a member for the Lausanne Committee for World Evangelization. The Cambridge Declaration came about in 1996 as a result of his book No Place for Truth, or Whatever Happened to Evangelical Theology?

== Books ==
He has authored, co-authored, or edited numerous publications including:

- Wells, David F.; Pinnock, Clark H., eds. (1972), Toward a Theology for the Future, Downers Grove, IL: InterVarsity Press, ISBN 0-87784910-2
- ——— (1972), Revolution in Rome, Downers Grove: InterVarsity Press, ISBN 0-87784910-2
- ———; Woodbridge, John D., eds. (1975), The Evangelicals: What They Believe Who They Are Where They Are Changing, Nashville: Abingdon Press, ISBN 0-68712181-7
- ——— (1978), The Search for Salvation, Downers Grove: InterVarsity Press, ISBN 0-87784706-1
- ——— (1979), The Prophetic Theology of George Tyrrell, Chico: Scholars Press, ISBN 0-89130375-8
- ——— (1984), The Person of Christ, Westchester: Crossway, ISBN 0-89107315-9
- ———, ed. (1985), Reformed Theology in America, Grand Rapids: William B. Eerdmans Publishing Co., ISBN 0-80280096-3
- ——— (1987), God The Evangelist, Grand Rapids: William B Eerdmans, ISBN 0-80280271-0
- ———; Noll, Mark, eds. (1988), Christian Faith and Practice in the Modern World, Grand Rapids: William B Eerdmans, ISBN 0-80280279-6
- ——— (1989), Turning to God, Exeter: Paternoster Press, ISBN 0-80109700-2, republished Turning to God, Grand Rapids: Baker, 2012
- ———; Eden, Martyn, eds. (1991), The Gospel in the Modern World, Leicester: InterVarsity Press, ISBN 0-83081756-5
- ——— (1993), No Place for Truth, or, Whatever Happened to Evangelical Theology, Grand Rapids: William B Eerdmans, ISBN 0-80283713-1
- ——— (1994), God in the Wasteland, Grand Rapids: William B Eerdmans, ISBN 0-80283773-5
- ——— (1995), The Bleeding of the Evangelical Church, Edinburgh: Banner of Truth Trust, ISBN 0-85151682-3
- ——— (1998), Losing Our Virtue, Grand Rapids: William B Eerdmans, ISBN 0-80283827-8
- ——— (2005), Above All Earthly Pow'rs, Grand Rapids: William B Eerdmans, ISBN 0-80282902-3
- ——— (2008), The Courage to be Protestant, Grand Rapids: William B Eerdmans, ISBN 978-0-80284007-3
- ——— (2014), God in the Whirlwind, Wheaton: Crossway, ISBN 978-1-43353131-6

=== Articles and chapters ===
- ——— (1972). "The Pope as Antichrist: the Substance of George Tyrrell's Polemic". Harvard Theological Review. 65 (2): 271–283. doi:10.1017/S0017816000002509.
- ——— (1973). "George Tyrrell: Precursor of Process Theology". Scottish Journal of Theology. 26 (1): 71–84. doi:10.1017/S0036930600033081.
- ——— (1987). "The Collision of Views on the Atonement: 3 Part of The Debate over the Atonement in 19th-Century America". Bibliotheca Sacra. 144 (576): 363.
- ——— (1988). "Jaroslav Pelikan, Jesus Through the Centuries: His Place in the History of Culture (Book Review)". Fides et Historia. 20 (2): 32.
- ——— (1995). "The Assurance of Things Hoped For by Avery Dulles (Book Review)". First Things (57): 54.
- ——— (1995). "Book reviews -- The Metaphor of God Incarnate: Christology in a Pluralistic Age by John Hick". Theology Today. 52 (1): 138.
- ——— (2008). "Christian Discipleship in a Postmodern World". Journal of the Evangelical Theological Society. 51 (1): 19.
