= Hubert Cunliffe-Jones =

Australian-born Congregational Church minister and author

- Born: March 30, 1905; Strathfield, New South Wales
- Died: January 3, 1991 (aged 85); Billericay, Essex
- Occupations: Minister, Professor
- Spouse: Maude Edith Clifton (1933)
- Children: 2 daughters, 2 sons
- Parent(s): Walter and Maud Cunliffe-Jones

Academic background
- Education: Newington College; University of Sydney (B.A.); Melbourne College of Divinity (B.D.); Camden College
- Alma mater: Mansfield College, Oxford (B.Litt.)
- Academic advisor: Clement C. J. Webb

Academic work
- Institutions: University of Manchester
- Doctoral students: David F. Wells

Hubert Cunliffe-Jones (30 March 1905 – 3 January 1991) was an Australian-born Congregational Church minister and author, who became chairman of the Congregational Union of England and Wales and a professor at the University of Manchester. He was an Honorary Doctor of Divinity from the University of Edinburgh.

== Early life ==
Cunliffe-Jones was born in Strathfield, New South Wales, the son of the Reverend Walter and Maud Cunliffe-Jones. His father was minister of the Strathfield-Homebush Congregational church (now Uniting Church – Korean Parish). He was educated at Newington College (1917–1921) and in his final year was awarded one of three Wigram Allen Scholarships. These were presented by Sir George Wigram Allen following a special examination in March of each year, for classics, mathematics and general proficiency. In 1921, Cunliffe-Jones received the scholarship in classics and William Morrow for general proficiency. He went to the University of Sydney in 1922 and graduated as a Bachelor of Arts in 1925. He then studied theology at the Camden College, Glebe, and the Melbourne College of Divinity, graduating with a Bachelor of Divinity. He was ordained in 1928 and received the call to minister at Warrnambool. He married his wife of 56 years, Maude Edith Clifton in 1933.

== Ministry ==
- Minister, Warrnambool, Victoria Congregational Church, 1928 to 1929
- Travelling Secretary, Australian Student Christian Movement, 1929–1930
- Minister, Witney, Oxfordshire Congregational Church, 1933 to 1937
- Chairman, Congregational Union of England and Wales, 1957 to 1958

== Academic ==
In 1930, Cunliffe-Jones went to England and read theology at Mansfield, the then Nonconformist college of the University of Oxford. While at Mansfield, he completed a thesis titled The Problem of Evil with Special Reference to the Theodicee of Leibnitz under the supervision of Clement C. J. Webb. After parish work in Witney he became a tutor in systematic theology at Yorkshire United Independent College, Bradford. In 1947 he became Principal of Yorkshire. Eleven years later, in 1958, Cunliffe-Jones was appointed Associate Principal of the Northern Congregational College in Manchester whilst lecturing at the University of Manchester. In 1966 he was made Professor, History of Doctrine, at Manchester University and from 1968 until 1973 he was Professor of Theology. Following his retirement, Cunliffe-Jones was professor emeritus. After his wife Maude died on 28 August 1989 Cunliffe-Jones lived with Margaret, his elder daughter, at her home in Essex. He died in 1991, survived by two daughters and two sons.

The Davidson Affair, a novel by Stuart Jackman was dedicated to Rev. Cunliffe-Jones.

=== Books ===
- Cunliffe-Jones, Hubert (1943). The Holy Spirit. London: Independent Press.
- ——— (1945). The Authority of the Biblical Revelation. London: Clarke.
- ——— (1951). Deuteronomy: Introduction and Commentary. London: SCM Press. OCLC 00368786.
- ——— (1955). The Congregational Ministry in the Modern World. London: Independent Press. OCLC 7605560.
- ——— (1960). The Book of Jeremiah: Introduction and Commentary. London: SCM Press. OCLC 04145139.
- ——— (1961). Technology, Community and Church. London: Independent Press.
- ——— (1970). Christian Theology since 1600. London: Duckworth. ISBN 9780715605202. OCLC 00109008.
- ———; Drewery, Benjamin; Fisher, George Park (1980). A History of Christian Doctrine. Philadelphia: Fortress Press. ISBN 9780800606268. OCLC 05447623.
- ———; Kent, John (1982). The End of the Line? : The Development of Christian Theology in the Last Two Centuries. London: SCM Press. ISBN 0334003830.

=== Articles and chapters ===
- ——— (1950). "Calvin". Theology. 53 (363): 343. doi:10.1177/0040571X5005336306.
- ——— (1951). "Congregationalist". In Richardson, Alan; Schweitzer, Wolfgang (eds.). Biblical Authority for Today; a World Council of Churches Symposium on "The Biblical Authority for the Churches' Social and Political Message Today. Philadelphia: Westminster Press. pp. 45–58. OCLC 01374826.
- ——— (1952). "Ought Christian Man to Be Afraid?". Theology Today. 8 (4): 442–452. doi:10.1177/004057365200800404.
- ——— (1956). "Serious Encounter: The Bible and the Theologian". Interpretation. 10 (4): 411–419. doi:10.1177/002096435601000403.
- ——— (1959). "The Teaching of Theology". Theology. 62 (464): 64–65. doi:10.1177/0040571X5906246406.
- ——— (1972). "A Maurice Reference". Theology. 75 (622): 207. doi:10.1177/0040571X7207500410.
- ——— (1973). "John Macquarrie. The Faith of the People of God—a lay theology. pp. 191. (New York: Scribeners, 1972.) $6.95". Religious Studies. 9 (4): 506–508. doi:10.1017/S0034412500007319.
