= Bart Wallet =

Dutch historian (born 1977)

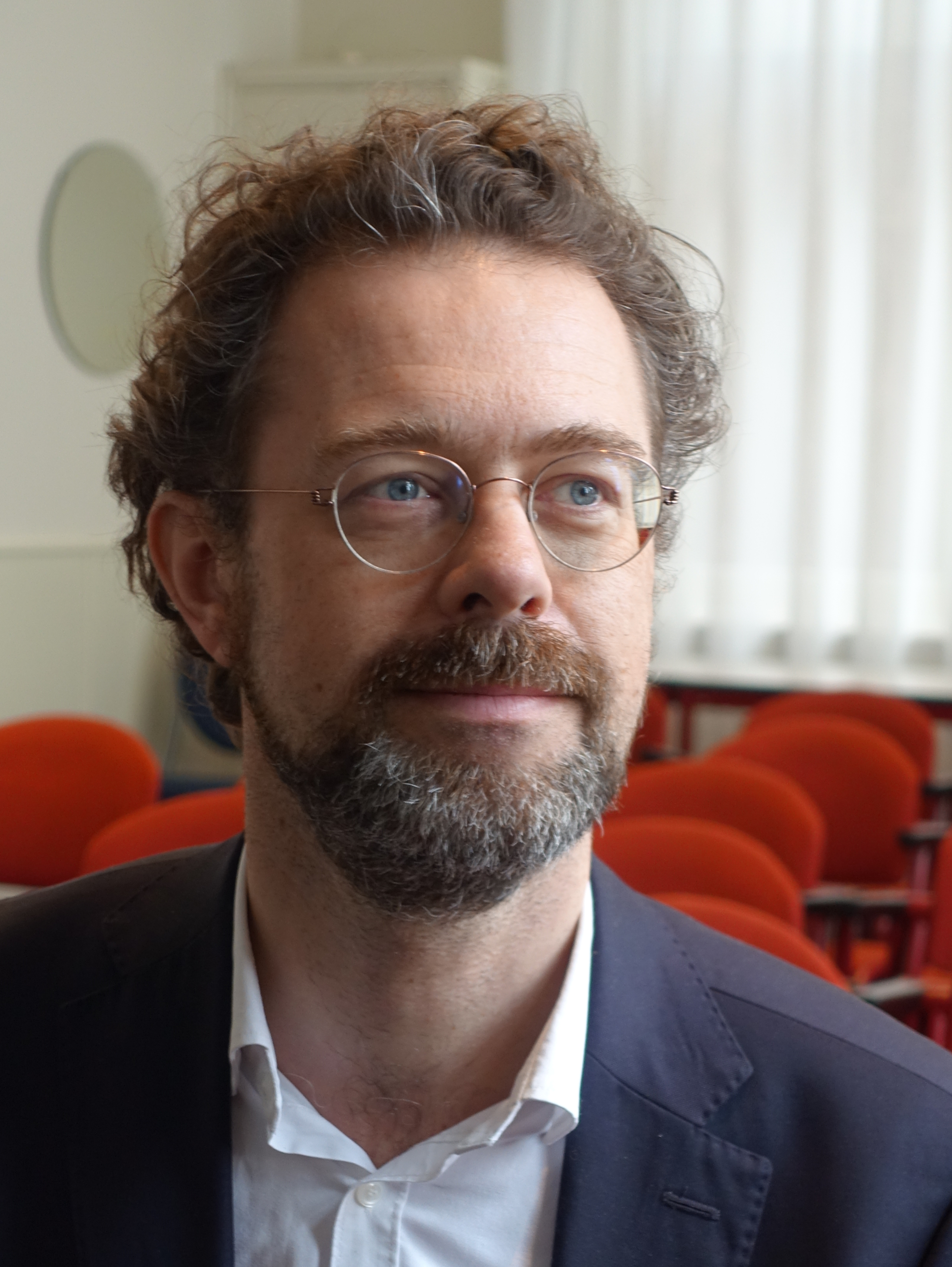
- Born: Barend Theodoor Wallet; 1977 (age 48–49); Amstelveen, Netherlands
- Education: University of Amsterdam
- Occupation: Jewish studies professor
- Years active: 2007–present
- Employer(s): University of Amsterdam (Ph.D, 2012)
- Children: 2

Bart Wallet (born 1977) is a Dutch historian and academic. Since 2021, he has been a professor of Jewish studies at the University of Amsterdam.

== Early life ==
Wallet was born as one of five siblings. His father, Aart Klaas Wallet, was a minister of the Christian Reformed Churches. He was interested in Judaism from a young age, and after completing a pre-university education at Wartburg College, he studied history and Hebrew at the University of Amsterdam. He graduated cum laude in 2002, and he obtained his PhD in 2012 for research into early modern Yiddish historiography in the northern Netherlands.

== Career ==
Following his PhD, he served as an assistant professor of Contemporary Jewish Studies at the Evangelical Theological Faculty until 2019. From 2016 onwards, he served as a lecturer in Hebrew & Jewish studies at his alma mater. Since 2018, he has done so in addition to his role as an assistant professor of Political History at Vrije Universiteit Amsterdam. He also served under the directorship at the Historical Documentation Center for Dutch Protestantism.

Starting September 1, 2021, Wallet became a Professor of Jewish Studies at the University of Amsterdam in addition to his work at Vrije Universiteit Amsterdam. He is also a contributor to Trajecta, Studia Rosenthaliana, and the European Journal of Jewish Studies and is a member of the European Center for Jewish Studies. He is a contributor for the Times of Israel.

Since May 2024, he has co-hosted a biweekly podcast on Evangelische Omroep, Wallet & Van Weezel, with Natascha van Weezel, which discusses contemporary happenings in the Jewish world.

== Personal life ==
Wallet is married and has two children. He attends the Amstelkerk in Amsterdam.

== Selected works ==
- Niet, Johan de; Paul, Herman; Wallet, Bart, eds. (2009). Sober, strict, and scriptural: collective memories of John Calvin, 1800-2000. Brill's series in church history. Leiden ; Boston: Brill. ISBN 978-90-04-17424-5.
- Barend Theodoor Wallet: Links in a chain. Early modern Yiddish historiography in the northern Netherlands (1743-1812). Dissertation. University of Amsterdam, 2012. Link to fulltext
- Wallet, Bart (2021). Sam en Henny (in Dutch). Uitgeverij Omniboek. ISBN 978-9401918220.
- Wallet, Bart (2017). Christendom en antisemitisme (in Dutch). Utrecht: Uitgeverij Boekencentrum. ISBN 978-9023951971.
- Bart, Wallet; Bloom, Hans; Berg, Hetty; Wertheim, David J. (2021). Reappraising the history of the Jews in the Netherlands. The Littman library of Jewish civilization (Second ed.). London: The Littman Library of Jewish Civilization in association with Liberpool University Press. ISBN 978-1-78694-187-9.
- Wallet, Bart (2026). The Early Modern Rabbis of Amsterdam : Urban Dynamics, Communal Tensions, and Diasporic Entanglement:. Vol. 2025, 51-1/2. Studia Rosenthaliana. ISBN 9789048576029.
