= Saint Andrew's Chapel (Sanford, Florida) =

Independent Reformed church in Sanford, Florida, US

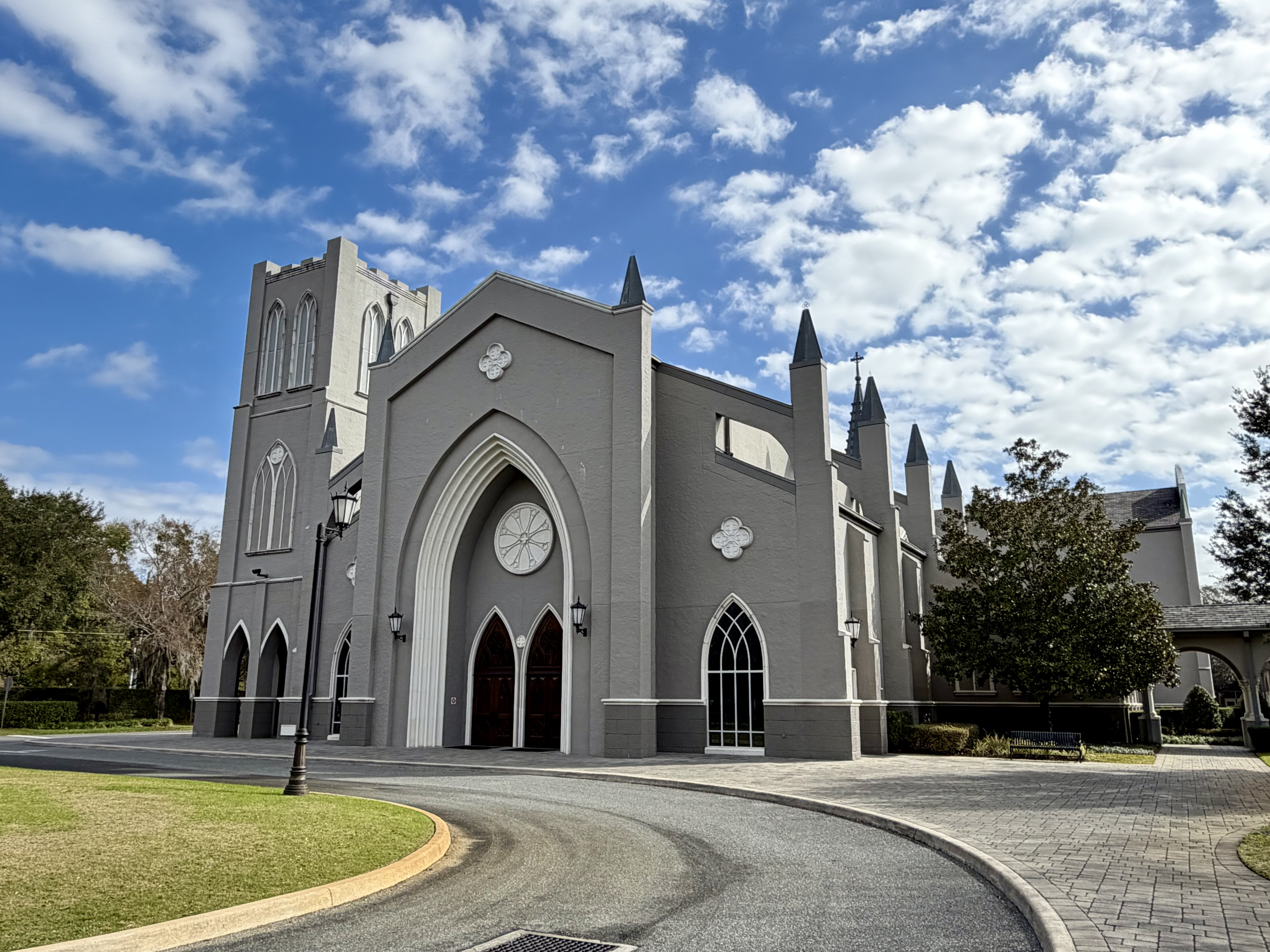
- Saint Andrew's Chapel in 2026
- Saint Andrew's Chapel
- 28.8077°N 81.3589°W
- Address: 5525 Wayside Drive, Sanford, Florida
- Country: United States
- Denomination: None
- Previous denomination: Presbyterian Church in America (2023–2025)
- Website: sachapel.com

History
- Founded: 1997
- Founder: R. C. Sproul
- Dedicated: 2009

Architecture
- Style: Gothic Revival
- Completed: 2009
- Construction cost: $18 million ($27 million in 2025)

Clergy
- Pastor: Burk Parsons

Saint Andrew's Chapel (SAC) is an independent Reformed church in Sanford, Florida, United States. It was founded by Reformed theologian R. C. Sproul in 1997 and grew to over 1,000 members by the 2020s. The church is located in a Gothic Revival-inspired sanctuary on a campus shared with Ligonier Ministries and Reformation Bible College, two other organizations founded by Sproul. In addition to its association with Sproul, the congregation also became known for its music conservatory program.

Since Sproul's death in 2017, SAC has been led by Burk Parsons. It was briefly part of the Presbyterian Church in America from 2023 to 2025. During this time, concerns were raised over Parsons' leadership style and the congregation's financial transparency. After Parsons was found guilty of harsh treatment of congregants in a church trial, SAC disaffiliated from the PCA, rendering moot complaints about lack of financial transparency made to PCA bodies. However, when members sought to resign from SAC to remain in the PCA, SAC refused to allow the resignations and instead excommunicated those members.

== History ==
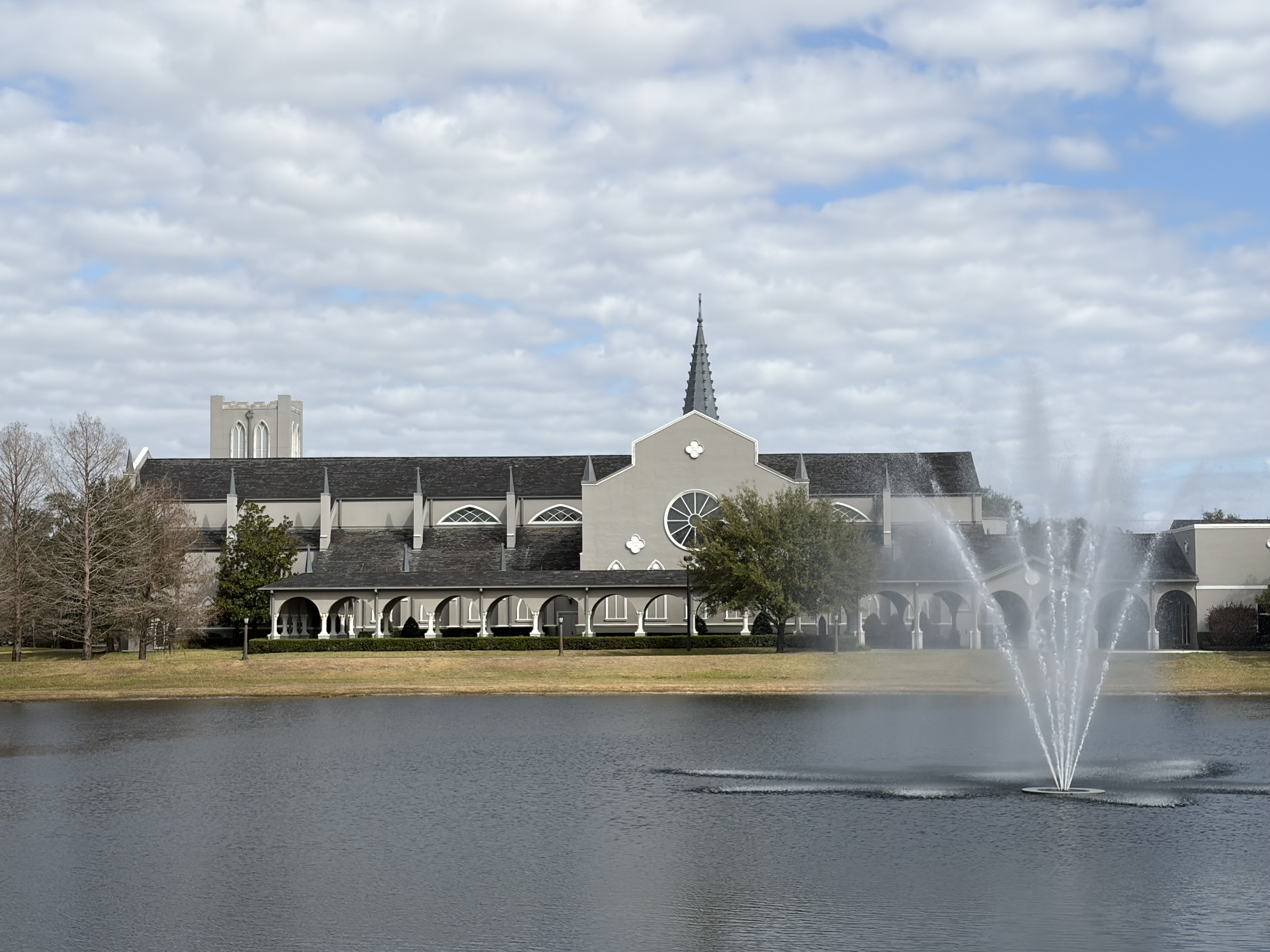
The SAC sanctuary viewed across a pond from the Reformation Bible College campus

Sproul founded SAC in 1997 with 40 members. The church completed a building in Sanford around 2001 and had 300 in average attendance by 2002. In 2002, SAC launched Saint Andrew's Conservatory of Music, which drew 100 students of all ages by 2007 and offered lessons in voice, music theory and a wide range of orchestral instruments.

In 2005 and 2007, the congregation purchased a 42-acre (17 ha) campus in Sanford to build a larger facility. The $18 million building was dedicated in 2009 with nearly 1,400 in attendance. Sproul died in 2017 and was succeeded as senior minister by Burk Parsons.

After being a non-denominational church for its first 26 years, SAC joined the Presbyterian Church in America (PCA) in 2023. It was one of the largest churches in the PCA with over 1,000 members. However, its relationship with the PCA soured in 2025 after the Central Florida Presbytery suspended Parsons from ministry over ecclesiastical charges of harsh treatment toward congregants. In December 2025, before Parsons' appeal was heard, SAC's congregation voted to disaffiliate from the PCA and return to being non-denominational.

While SAC was part of the PCA, members raised concerns about the congregation's financial transparency and requested financial information that the SAC's bylaws required to be disclosed to church members. After SAC did not provide the requested information, members raised the issue to the local PCA presbytery, a case that became moot after SAC's disaffiliation. While the case became moot and the financial information was not disclosed, SAC salary information reported to the presbytery showed that Parsons' salary was six standard deviations above that of a senior pastor in central Florida (in addition to undisclosed income from Ligonier Ministries), and that until 2022, Parsons and other pastors were setting their own salaries without disclosing them to SAC's governing session. SAC disputed the accuracy of the salary figures but did not disclose anything further.

After SAC disaffiliated from the PCA, one of its lay elders resigned his membership to remain a member of the PCA. SAC refused to allow the elder to resign and instead held a church trial and found the elder guilty of contumacy, a move that observers described as retribution. The elder received a letter excommunicating him from SAC, as did Stephen Nichols, the longtime president of Reformation Bible College (RBC), and his wife, who had also resigned their memberships in SAC to remain in the PCA but had their voluntary resignations blocked. Nichols abruptly stepped down from his roles at RBC and Ligonier at the same time.

== Architecture ==
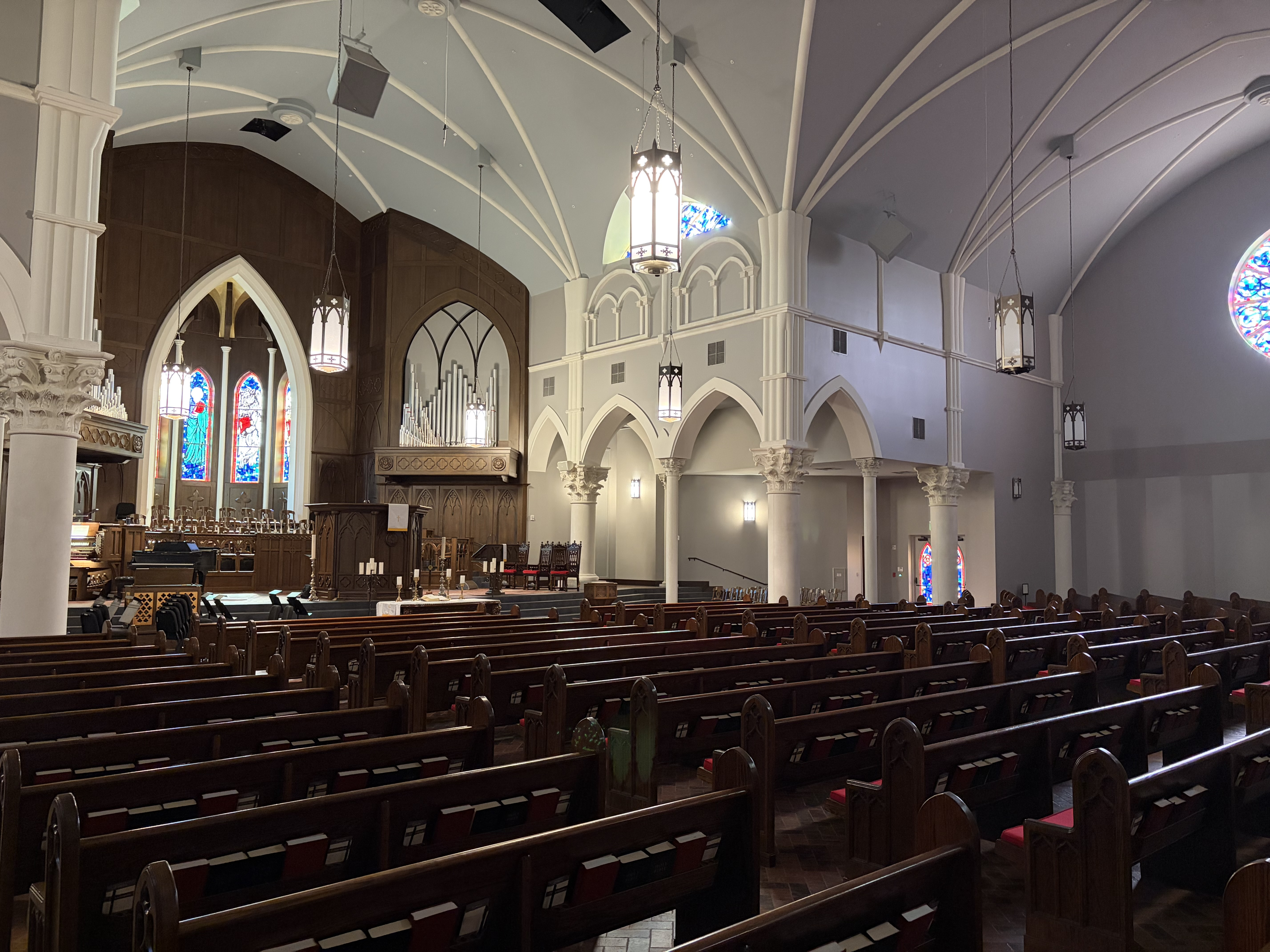
Inside the SAC sanctuary looking toward the pulpit and apse

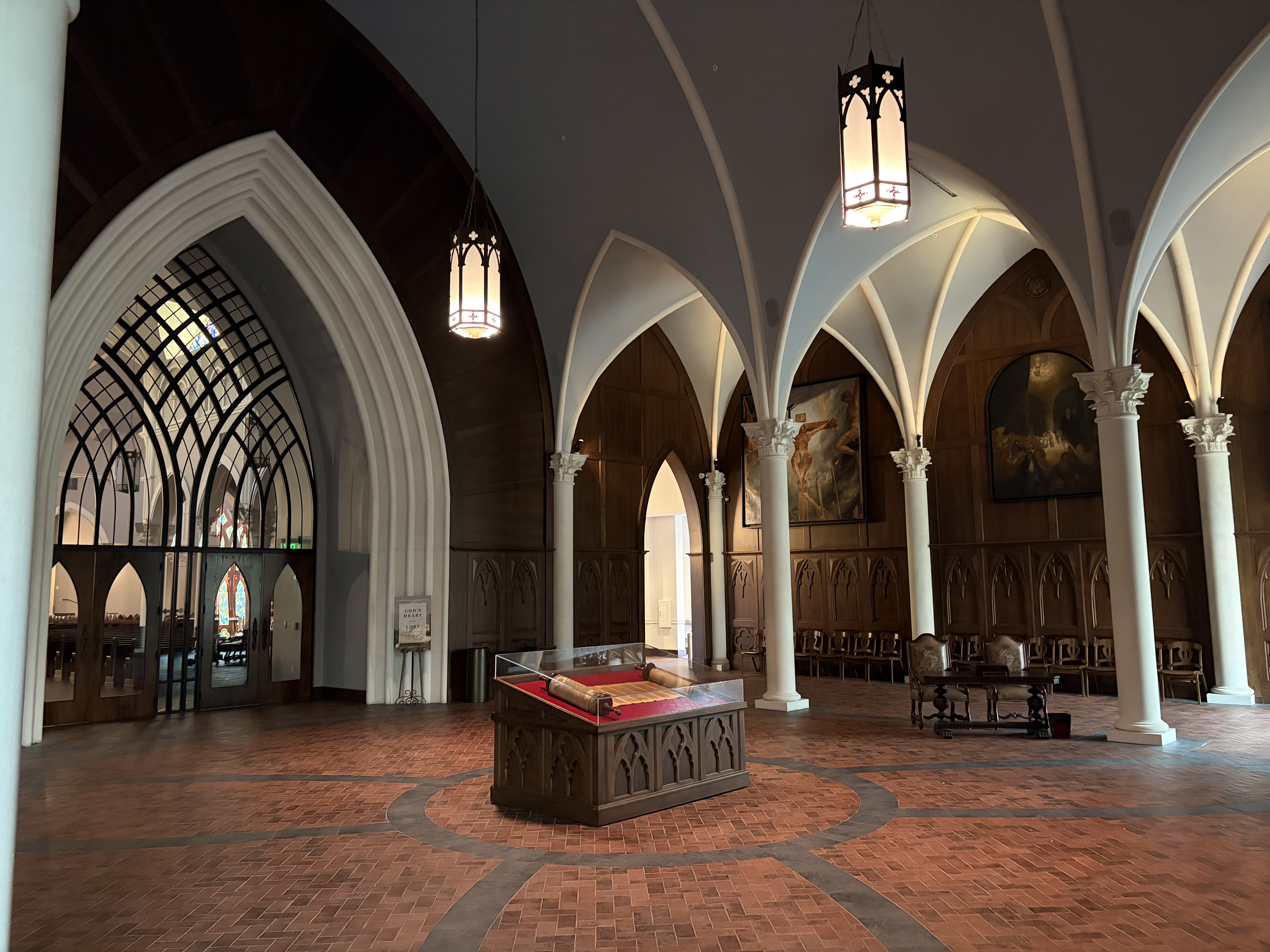
SAC's narthex includes a Torah scroll.

SAC's building is designed in a Gothic Revival style. It is co-located with other organizations founded by Sproul, including Ligonier Ministries and RBC but operates independently, although Parsons has been a Ligonier board member and senior executive.

The interior of the sanctuary is laid out in a cruciform plan. A prominent pulpit is placed in the center of the sanctuary. The apse includes five stained glass windows depicting Paul the Apostle and the Four Evangelists, while the transepts are marked by rose windows, one displaying a throne and the other a crown and scepter. The narthex features a 300-to-400-year-old Torah scroll and a series of paintings by Richard Serrin of the life of Christ.

== Organ ==
The SAC sanctuary has a custom-fitted Reuter organ with 4,100 pipes arranged in 57 voices in five divisions. The organ was based on Ernest M. Skinner's "American Classic" organs.
