= W. Robert Godfrey =

American theologian and academic (born 1945)

- Born: 1945
- Education: Gordon–Conwell Theological Seminary; Stanford University
- Occupations: Professor, seminary president, author, minister
- Notable work: An Unexpected Journey, God's Pattern for Creation, Pleasing God in Our Worship
- Spouse: Mary Ellen
- Theological work
- Tradition or movement: Reformed, Methodism (earlier years)
- Main interests: Church history

W. Robert Godfrey is an American Reformed theologian, historian, and pastor. Serving as a minister in the United Reformed Churches in North America, he was the third president of Westminster Seminary California. As of 2017 he is president emeritus and professor emeritus of church history. He currently is chairman of Ligonier Ministries, located in Sanford, Florida, a position he took over from the late R. C. Sproul.

Godfrey has taught at Westminster Seminary California since 1981 and previously taught at Westminster Theological Seminary in Philadelphia, as well as Gordon–Conwell Theological Seminary and Stanford University. He is a council member of the Alliance of Confessing Evangelicals, an organization of pastors and theologians from the Baptist, Presbyterian, Reformed, Anglican, Congregational, and Lutheran church communities. He has been a speaker at many theological conferences, including those sponsored by the Philadelphia Conference on Reformed Theology, Ligonier Ministries, and the Lausanne Committee for World Evangelization.

Godfrey earned his Master of Divinity from Gordon–Conwell Theological Seminary and a Master of Arts and PhD from Stanford University.

Godfrey grew up in Alameda, California, where his father and grandfather each served as mayor. He was introduced to Calvinism when he was a teenager. He lives in California with his wife Mary Ellen, with whom he has three grown children, who also reside in California.

In 2010 a Festschrift was published in his honor. Always Reformed: Essays in Honor of W. Robert Godfrey included contributions from R. Scott Clark, Sinclair B. Ferguson, D. G. Hart, Michael S. Horton, Richard Muller, R. C. Sproul, and David VanDrunen.

== Published works ==
Books written by Godfrey include the following:

- Pleasing God in Our Worship (1999)
- God's Pattern for Creation: A Covenantal Reading of Genesis 1 (2003)
- Reformation Sketches: Insights into Luther, Calvin, and the Confessions (2003)
- An Unexpected Journey: Discovering Reformed Christianity (2004, autobiographical)
- John Calvin: Pilgrim and Pastor (2009)
- Westminster Seminary California: A New Old School (2012, co-written with D. G. Hart)
- Learning to Love the Psalms (2017)
- Saving the Reformation: The Pastoral Theology of the Canons of Dort (2019)

He has written chapters or articles for the following books:

- John Calvin: His Influence in the Western World (1982)
- Through Christ's Word: A Festschrift for Dr. Philip E. Hughes (1985)
- Theonomy: A Reformed Critique (1990, editor, along with William S. Barker)
- The Agony of Deceit: What Some TV Preachers are Really Teaching (1990)
- Roman Catholicism
- Sola Scriptura!: The Protestant Position on the Bible (1995)
- The Practice of Confessional Subscription (1995)
- The Coming Evangelical Crisis: Current Challenges to Authority of Scripture and the Gospel (1996)

Godfrey has also written articles for journals such as the Westminster Theological Journal, Archive for Reformation History, and Sixteenth-Century Journal.

== See also ==
- Calvinistic Methodism
