= R. C. Sproul =

American theologian and Christian apologist (1939–2017)

The Reverend R. C. Sproul
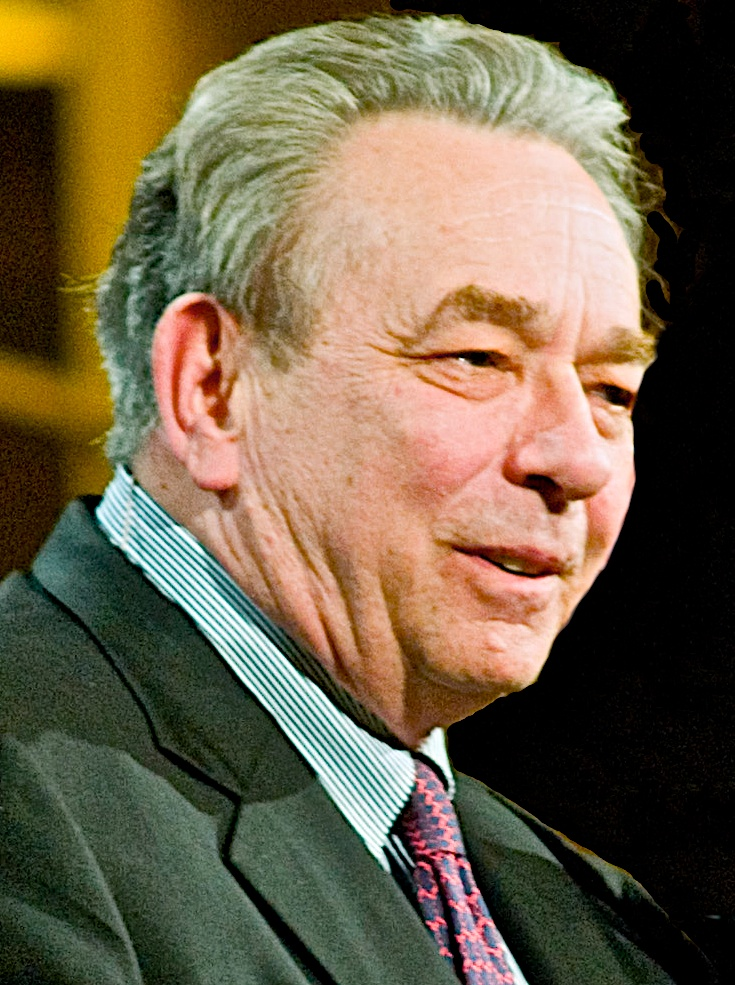
- Sproul in 2006
- Born: Robert Charles Sproul; February 13, 1939; Pittsburgh, Pennsylvania, U.S.
- Died: December 14, 2017 (aged 78); Altamonte Springs, Florida, U.S.
- Education: Westminster College (BA); Pittsburgh Theological Seminary (MDiv); Vrije Universiteit Amsterdam (Doctorandus / MA)
- Occupations: Professor; author; pastor
- Spouse: Vesta Sproul (m. 1960)
- Children: 2, Sherrie Lee Sproul (Dorotiak), R. C. Sproul Jr.
- Ordination: UPCUSA (1965–1975); PCA (1975–2017)
- Theological work
- Tradition or movement: Reformed (Presbyterianism); Methodism (early years)
- Main interests: Biblical inerrancy; Classical apologetics; Systematic theology

Robert Charles Sproul (Note: Sproul is typically referred to as R. C. Sproul, R. C. Sproul, Sr., or simply R. C.) (/sproʊl/ SPROHL; February 13, 1939 – December 14, 2017) was an American Reformed theologian, Christian apologist, and Presbyterian pastor. Being the founder and first chairman of Ligonier Ministries, (Note: Ligonier Ministries is named for the Ligonier Valley just outside Pittsburgh, where the ministry started as a study center for college and seminary students, having been inspired by L'Abri.) Sproul could be heard daily on the Renewing Your Mind radio broadcast internationally.

Working as a staunch defender of Protestantism, Sproul saw emerging modern technologies as an opportunity to disseminate teaching on Reformed theology. Faced with an increase in ecumenical activity between evangelical and Catholic figures in the 1990s, (Note: This included friends close to Sproul, such as Chuck Colson and J. I. Packer, who co-signed the Evangelicals and Catholics Together document.) Sproul engaged in polemics to defend the evangelical doctrine of justification by faith alone. He has been described as "the greatest and most influential proponent of the recovery of Reformed theology in the last century."

== Education and personal life ==
Sproul was born in Pittsburgh, Pennsylvania, as the second child of Robert Cecil Sproul, an accountant and future veteran of World War II, and his wife, Mayre Ann Sproul (née Yardis). Sproul was baptized as a boy at Mount Washington Methodist Church. His family later joined Pleasant Hills Community Church, a congregation of the United Presbyterian Church. He was an avid supporter of the Pittsburgh Steelers and Pittsburgh Pirates as a youth, and at the age of 15, he had to drop out from high school athletics in order to support his family.

Having become a Christian in 1957, Sproul met with his childhood minister to share his conversion. During the meeting, the minister stated, "If you believe in the resurrection of Christ, you're a damn fool!" stunning Sproul, left wrestling with "feelings of betrayal."

Proceeding with study, he obtained degrees from Westminster College, Pennsylvania (BA, 1961), Pittsburgh Theological Seminary (MDiv, 1964), the Vrije Universiteit Amsterdam (Drs., 1969), and Whitefield Theological Seminary (PhD, 2001). He taught at numerous colleges and seminaries, including Reformed Theological Seminary in Orlando and in Jackson, Mississippi, and Knox Theological Seminary in Ft. Lauderdale.

One of Sproul's mentors was John H. Gerstner, being one of his professors at Pittsburgh-Xenia Theological Seminary. The two of them, along with Arthur Lindsley, another of Gerstner's students, co-authored the book Classical Apologetics in 1984. Sproul's ministry, Ligonier Ministries, made recordings of Gerstner teaching various courses on theology and the Bible. John M. Frame records that Gerstner was Sproul's "main intellectual influence."

Sproul recalls encountering theological opposition inside a liberal environment (Note: With regard to theological liberalism, see the fundamentalist–modernist controversy.) during his early studies:

When I was a seminary student ... I was selected to preach the senior sermon before the whole student body, the whole faculty, and also the presbytery who met there that day. And I preached that day on sin, and I made reference to some of the definitions of sin that we had learned at seminary: that sin, you know, was existential, inauthentic existence, or sin was some kind of neurosis ... And I said, you know, we may be neurotic, and we may be doing everything that we know how to destroy what authenticity of existence we may have, but ... the meaning of sin, as [Scripture and] our own confession says, (Note: That is, referring to the Westminster Shorter Catechism.) is that it's "any want of conformity to, or transgression of, the law of God." ... Well, the student body that was largely liberal ... congratulated me, and they were very positive. I go make my way to the back of the church, and the dean of the institution comes up to me, and he's irate. [He physically threw me up against a wall and accused me of distorting the Bible.] ... So I went straight upstairs to Dr. Gerstner's office, who was my mentor, and I said, Dr. Gerstner, did I distort the truth of God? [I was so upset, I was shaking.] And he looked at me, and he said, ... "Every Christian in heaven from Paul to B. B. Warfield is rejoicing at the sermon that you preached in this house today." ... I was so relieved to hear his evaluation.

Gerstner convinced Sproul to study under G. C. Berkouwer at the Vrije Universiteit Amsterdam (Free University of Amsterdam) in Holland, where he initiated study in 1964. Sproul was granted leave in 1965 due to his wife's second pregnancy and mother's illness (during which he was appointed to teach philosophy at Westminster College), and later resumed study at distance. He returned to Holland in 1969 to receive a doctorandus degree.

He married Vesta Voorhis in 1960 and had two children, Sherrie Dorotiak and Robert Craig Sproul.

Sproul was a passenger on the Amtrak train that derailed in the 1993 Big Bayou Canot train wreck, and sometimes gave firsthand accounts of the story.

== Career ==
Working alongside figures such as Bill Bright and Jim Boice, Sproul served as president of the International Council on Biblical Inerrancy (ICBI) from 1977 till 1979.

Under Sproul's direction, Ligonier Ministries produced the Ligonier Statement on Biblical Inerrancy, which would eventually grow into the 1978 Chicago Statement on Biblical Inerrancy. Along with Norman Geisler, Sproul was one of the chief architects of the statement.

Ligonier Ministries hosts several theological conferences each year, including the main conference in Orlando, FL, at which Sproul was one of the primary speakers. Sproul served as co-pastor at Saint Andrew's Chapel, a congregation in Sanford, Florida. He was ordained as an elder in the United Presbyterian Church in the USA in 1965, but left that denomination around 1975 and joined the Presbyterian Church in America. He was also a Council member of the Alliance of Confessing Evangelicals. Being a staunch critic of the Catholic Church and Catholic theology, Sproul denounced the 1994 ecumenical document Evangelicals and Catholics Together.

Sproul was an advocate of Reformed theology in his many print, audio, and video publications, and advocated the Thomistic (classical) approaches to Christian apologetics, less common among Reformed apologists, most of whom prefer presuppositionalism. A dominant theme in his Renewing Your Mind lessons is the holiness and sovereignty of God. Sproul taught that headcovering should be practiced in churches as the ordinance is "rooted and grounded in creation".

Sproul was a critic of postmodern philosophy. He considered postmodern thinking as a seduction to the church. This seduction originated towards the end of the cultural revolution of the 1960s and produced "the most narcissistic generation in the history of the human race." Sproul saw churches responding to that cultural change by "adopting the use of sound bites, entertainment, and that sort of thing" in replacement of using biblical teaching directly. Further, he found that this infiltration of postmodernity led to a "revival of ancient Gnosticism" with a "wide spread rejection of rationality" within the Christian church. He believed that many churches, as a result of this rejection, now teach that "biblical revelation is only intelligible by intuition or by a particularly sensitive poetic imagination". Sproul stated that this "intrusion of irrationality coming from existential philosophy, neo-orthodox theology, and the resurgence of mysticism set forth in neo-Gnosticism" stood in opposition to the "coherence and intelligibility of God’s divine work".

Stephen Nichols records that Sproul's quote "Sin is cosmic treason," found in his book The Holiness of God, was incorporated into an edition of Bartlett's Familiar Quotations:

Now R. C. got a lot of books in the mail. And one day he got a book in the mail, and it was Bartlett's Familiar Quotations. This was a standard reference book of quotations, and the book was accompanied by a letter. And as he's reading the letter, he's told by the publisher that he's receiving this copy of the book because one of his quotations has made it into the book. And the quotation is indeed "Sin is cosmic treason." This is a way of getting at two doctrines that are very important to him: the holiness of God, of course, on the one pole and on the other pole, the sinfulness of man. We talk about little sins. We even have this expression "peccadillo." But this saying reminds us that all sin is not regional treason. It's not even national treason. It's on a cosmic scale because it is against God.

In 2003, a Festschrift was published in his honor. After Darkness, Light: Essays in Honor of R. C. Sproul (ISBN 0875527043) included contributions from Robert Godfrey, Sinclair Ferguson, O. Palmer Robertson, Michael Horton, Douglas Wilson, John F. MacArthur, and Jay E. Adams.

=== Teaching ===
In Sproul's 1983 teaching series Developing Christian Character, he discusses the issue of assurance of salvation, considering topics of human psychology, attempts at self-justification, and Martin Luther's torment in rigorously applying God's law to himself, prior to discovering the doctrine of justification by faith alone:

The first time I lost my innocence as a young boy—in a sexual encounter—I was 12 years old. And I'll never forget what happened to me. I came home, and I vomited. I was not a Christian, [yet] torn apart by remorse for my sin. But I knew the pain of guilt. Even as a stranger to Christ, I knew what I had done was wrong, and I did not like myself. But you know what? By the time I was 15, I had a callous on my soul. And it didn't bother me anymore. Because somewhere between 12 and 15, I took my standards, and my ideals, and I adjusted them down to where I was. And I'm not the only person that's ever done that. We all do it. Luther was too smart—he saw through it. He saw that you're kidding yourself. God is holy, and he demands holiness from his creatures. And if a person really thinks that they've achieved that holiness, they are in the worst of all kinds of forms of self-delusion.

In 1996, Sproul gave a lecture on irresistible grace, titled Divine Sovereignty and Man’s Helplessness. During a Q & A session, he misattributes to Jonathan Edwards an analogy regarding the "holy rape of the soul," claiming that "some people are violently offended by that language—I think it's the most graphic and descriptive term I can think of, to how I was redeemed," taking into consideration theological themes surrounding total depravity and being in a state of spiritual death prior to conversion. (Note: A recording of the lecture was released by Ligonier Ministries on cassette tape. On total depravity and spiritual death, see Romans 2:14–16, Romans 3:9–20, and Ephesians 2:1–10.) With regard to the terminology "rape", a key topic in debate between Arminian and Reformed theologians is the hermeneutic employed to understand the meaning and strength of the verb "draws" (Greek helkysē) in John 6:44, where Jesus states, "No one can come to me unless the Father who sent me draws him. And I will raise him up on the last day." Sproul first uses the analogy in his 1984 novel Johnny Come Home, (Note: This was later republished in 1988 as Thy Brother's Keeper.) where Scooter, the main character, designed to be a "composite of John Guest, Jim Boice, and [himself]," converts to Christianity in "a docile submission to the holy rape of the soul." (Note: This description was criticised in the foreword to Grace for All: The Arminian Dynamics of Salvation, edited by Clark H. Pinnock and John D. Wagner.) Sproul also uses the analogy in his 1989 teaching series A Shattered Image, where discussing the Pelagian controversy, Sproul states that "the only way you will ever choose Christ is if God melts your heart, if God softens that stone cold recalcitrant heart, if God the Holy Spirit rapes your soul and puts in you a desire for Christ." By 2002, Sproul had abandoned the analogy for a revised perspective:

The person that God, the Holy Spirit, draws to Jesus comes to Jesus, not because he's raped, not because he's coerced, not because he's dragged, kicking and screaming against his will, but because God, the Holy Spirit, in that act of effectual drawing, changes the heart of the person. Where that person previously was blind to the things of God, now the scales of the eyes have been removed, and that which was unpleasant to the soul now is shown to be sweet, attractive, and something that is altogether desirable. So the heavenly drawing of God is one by which God changes the attitude or the inner disposition of the soul of the person so that when the Father draws them to His Son, they come to His Son.

At Ligonier's 2000 National Conference, Sproul gave a message eponymously titled Upsetting the World. Near the end of the message, Sproul draws attention to Paul's polemic in Philippians 3 against the Judaizers, arguing that English Bible translators had not precisely translated the meaning of the Greek word skybala, a New Testament hapax legomenon found in verse 8:

From their perspective, [the apostles] had absolutely nothing to lose. The Apostle Paul used a crudity in the Bible that no English translator up till this day has been bold enough to translate accurately in the vernacular. Instead, they have taken the word of the Apostle under the inspiration of God the Holy Spirit and translated it with an English euphemism. And the euphemism that is chosen is the choice of most translators, is the word "dung." It's not the word the Apostle used in the text. But forget that. What he was saying—however nice word you want to use—he said, "Whatever things I've gained in this world I count as dung, next to Christ, the Pearl of Great Price!"

With regard to the word in question, Daniel B. Wallace states the following in a word study of skybalon:

This word is used primarily for excrement, especially human excrement ... [Moisés Silva] goes on to say that the gloss "crap" would certainly communicate worthlessness, but is probably not strong enough to communicate revulsion ... the term conveys both revulsion and worthlessness in this context. In hellenistic Greek, it seems to stand somewhere between "crap" and "s**t." However, due to English sensibilities, and considering the readership (Christians), a softer term such as "dung" is most appropriate."

At the 2008 Together for the Gospel biennial conference, Sproul gave a message titled The Curse Motif of the Atonement. The message details the theological significance of the crucifixion of Jesus from an expository perspective. The message contains some content originally presented in his 1995 teaching series The Atonement of Jesus. Tim Challies, who attended the conference, recounts that "there is no doubt this was one of the most earnest, one of the most solemn sermons ever heard by that audience. I was there that day, I can tell you, there was a holy hush over that room as we were all forced to consider the sheer horror of what Jesus Christ endured on our behalf." Kevin DeYoung praised it as "one of the best sermons I’ve ever heard."

On April 3, 2016, Sproul gave a sermon titled Betrayed. Preaching from Luke 22:1–6, Sproul considers the personal relationship between Jesus and Judas, comparing themes of friendship and betrayal with his own life:

The most pernicious betrayal in the history of this world was that committed by a friend and disciple of Jesus, Judas Iscariot, who sold his Savior for a handful of money. ... In the grand scheme of economy, the sum that was paid to Judas for betraying Jesus was paltry. It was nothing. And after the deed had been done, and Judas was overcome with remorse, he knew that it was nothing. ... I've met tens of thousands of people in my lifetime. But I have a list of four names on a piece of paper. And those four names represent people that I wish, sorely wish, I had never, ever met them, at all. What do they have in common? They were all my friends. Not just friends—close friends. The other thing they have in common, is they all, every one of them, betrayed me. Just as every one of us has been betrayed by friends in this world. And every one of us has betrayed our friends in this world. ... there's a thousand ways in which I have betrayed Jesus ... But never once has He betrayed me.

== Health and death ==
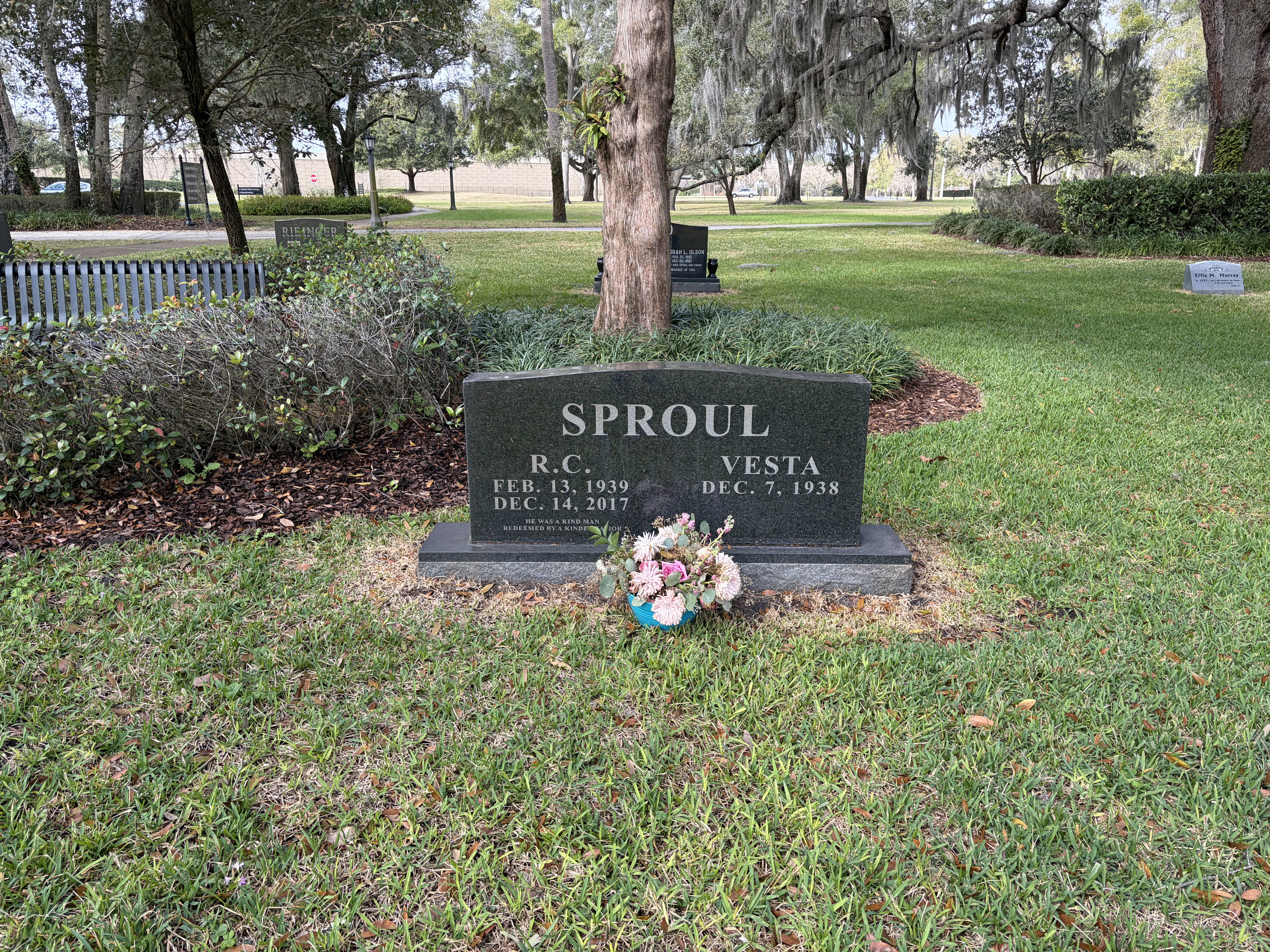
Sproul's grave in the churchyard of Saint Andrew's Chapel in Sanford, Florida.

Sproul struggled with a 40-year smoking addiction. In a personal interview, Sproul recounts the difficulty of stopping:

It almost destroyed my soul. I mean, I never prayed about anything so much about what I did as much as I did about that. I'm the one who proved the adage that it's easier to quit smoking because I did it a thousand times. I hated it ... but it was an addiction, a physiological addiction and I just couldn't kick it. ... earlier on when I was teaching, when I was in the church, and with certain colleges, it wasn't all that big of a deal. If you would go to conferences at Westminster Seminary, and everyone would have a smoking break—Van Til and Murray, and everybody ... 'cuz everybody smoked, especially those Dutch guys. It wasn't a big deal then as it is now ... but then there came a time where I was careful not to blatantly smoke in public because people just couldn't handle that. I remember once, the last cigarette that [a prominent Christian leader] (Note: The interviewer redacts the name of who Sproul mentions.) ever smoked, he borrowed from me. One time, he was smoking and somebody came and he didn't want him to see him, so he handed the cigarette to his associate ... his associate put it in his pocket and it started to burn up his pants!

On April 18, 2015, Sproul suffered a stroke and was admitted to a hospital. Five days later, on April 23, Sproul went home from the hospital, suffering no ill effects. He was, however, diagnosed with a diabetic condition "that [would] be addressed through diet and regular medical attention."

Sproul was living with chronic obstructive pulmonary disease, and was hospitalized on December 2, 2017, because of difficulty breathing, the result of an apparent infection, an “exacerbation of his emphysema due to the flu” (“not pneumonia”). After a twelve-day period of intermittent fever, and sedation and ventilator-assisted breathing, with effort given to restore his respiratory function, Sproul died on December 14, 2017 (at age 78).

== Publications ==
Some of Sproul's best-known books are The Holiness of God, Essential Truths of the Christian Faith, and What Is Reformed Theology? He is also well known for Chosen by God, a book about predestination and the sovereignty of God. Through Ligonier Ministries and the Renewing Your Mind radio program and conferences, Sproul generated numerous audio and video lectures on the subjects of history of philosophy, theology, Bible study, apologetics, intelligent design, and Christian living. In addition, Sproul wrote more than 100 books and many articles for evangelical publications. He signed the 1978 Chicago Statement on Biblical Inerrancy, which affirmed the traditional view of Biblical inerrancy, and he wrote a commentary on that document titled Explaining Inerrancy. He also served as the general editor of the Reformation Study Bible (ISBN 0-87552-643-8), which has appeared in several editions and was also known as the New Geneva Study Bible. In addition, Sproul was executive editor of Tabletalk magazine.

The following publication lists are primarily derived from R. C. Sproul: A Life by Stephen J. Nichols. (Note: Titles are sorted by chronological order, prioritized by original publication.)

=== Published books ===
- The Symbol: An Exposition of the Apostles' Creed (Phillipsburg, NJ: P&R, 1973; republished as Basic Training: Plain Talk on the Key Truths of the Faith, Grand Rapids, MI: Zondervan, 1982; republished as Renewing Your Mind: Basic Christian Beliefs You Need to Know, Grand Rapids, MI: Baker, 1998; republished as What We Believe: Understanding and Confessing the Apostles' Creed, Grand Rapids, MI: Baker, 2015; adaption of Basic Training teaching series published as The Race of Faith, Sanford, FL: Reformation Trust, 2016)
- The Psychology of Atheism (Bloomington, MN: Bethany Fellowship, 1974, 1988; Orlando, FL: Ligonier, 1997; republished as If There's a God, Why Are There Atheists?: Why Atheists Believe in Unbelief, Fearn, Scotland: Christian Focus, 2018)
- Discovering the Intimate Marriage (Bloomington, MN: Bethany Fellowship, 1975; Carol Stream, IL: Tyndale, 1986; republished as The Intimate Marriage: A Practical Guide to Building a Great Marriage, Phillipsburg, NJ: P&R, 2003)
- God's Inerrant Word: An International Symposium on the Trustworthiness of Scripture (Bloomington, MN: Bethany Fellowship, 1975; Irvine, CA: New Reformation Publications, 2018) (Note: Sproul authors the article on The Case for Inerrancy: A Methodological Analysis.)
- Soli Deo Gloria: Essays in Reformed Theology (Phillipsburg, NJ: P&R, 1976) (Note: Festschrift for John H. Gerstner, edited by Sproul.)
- Knowing Scripture (Downers Grove, IL: InterVarsity Press, 1978; expanded edition published in Downers Grove, IL: InterVarsity Press, 2016)
- Objections Answered (Glendale, CA: Gospel Light-Regal, 1978) / Reason to Believe: A Response to Common Objections to Christianity (Grand Rapids, MI: Zondervan, 1978, 1993, 2016)
- Explaining Inerrancy: A Commentary (Chicago, IL: ICBI, (Note: That is, the International Council on Biblical Inerrancy.) 1980; republished as Explaining Inerrancy, Orlando, FL: Ligonier, 1996; republished as Explaining Biblical Inerrancy: The Chicago Statements on Biblical Inerrancy, Hermeneutics, and Application with Official ICBI Commentary, Arlington, TX: Bastion, 2013) (Note: Co-authored by Sproul.)
- Stronger than Steel: The Wayne Alderson Story (San Francisco, CA: Harper & Row, 1980)
- In Search of Dignity (Glendale, CA: Regal, 1983, 1991; republished as The Hunger for Significance, Phillipsburg, NJ: P&R, 2001, 2020)
- Who Is Jesus?; Effective Prayer; God's Will and the Christian; Ethics and the Christian (Carol Stream, IL: Tyndale, 1983–1984; single volume edition published as Following Christ, Carol Stream, IL: Tyndale, 1991)
- Classical Apologetics (Grand Rapids, MI: Zondervan, 1984) (Note: Co-authored by Sproul.)
- Johnny Come Home (Glendale, CA: Regal, 1984; republished as Thy Brother's Keeper, Nashville, TN: Wolgemuth & Hyatt, 1988; Nashville, TN: Word, 1992)
- The Holiness of God (Tyndale, 1985; revised and expanded edition published by Tyndale, 1998, 2020; abridged version published as God is Holy And We're Not, Ligonier, 2014)
- Chosen by God (Tyndale, 1986, 1994, 2021)
- Lifeviews: Make a Christian Impact on Culture and Society (Revell, 1986; republished as Making a Difference: Impacting Society as a Christian, Baker, 2019)
- One Holy Passion: The Consuming Thirst to Know God (Thomas Nelson, 1987; Servant, 1995; republished as The Character of God: Discovering the God Who Is, Regal, 2003; republished as Discovering the God Who Is: His Character and Being, His Power and Personality, Regal, 2008; republished as Enjoying God: Finding Hope in the Attributes of God, Baker, 2017)
- Pleasing God: Discovering the Meaning and Importance of Sanctification (Tyndale, 1988; David C. Cook, 2012)
- Surprised by Suffering: The Role of Pain and Death in the Christian Life (Tyndale, 1989; Reformation Trust, 2009; twenty-fifth anniversary edition published by Reformation Trust, 2014)
- Abortion: A Rational Look at an Emotional Issue (NavPress, 1990; twentieth anniversary edition published by Reformation Trust, 2010)
- The Glory of Christ (Tyndale, 1990; republished by P&R, 2003)
- The Mystery of the Holy Spirit (Tyndale, 1990; Christian Focus, 2009; twenty-fifth anniversary edition published by Reformation Trust, 2018)
- Essential Truths of the Christian Faith (Tyndale, 1992)
- The Soul's Quest for God: Satisfying the Hunger for Spiritual Communion with God (Tyndale, 1993; P&R, 2003)
- Romans (Christian Focus, 1994; republished as The Gospel of God: An Exposition of Romans, Christian Focus, 1999)
- Not A Chance: God, Science, and the Revolt Against Reason (Baker, 1994; expanded edition published by Baker, 2014)
- Ephesians (Christian Focus, 1994; republished as The Purpose of God: An Exposition of Ephesians, Christian Focus, 2002)
- Faith Alone: The Evangelical Doctrine of Justification (Baker, 1995, 2016)
- Mighty Christ: Touching Glory (Christian Focus, 1995; revised edition published as The Unexpected Jesus: The Truth Behind His Biblical Names, Christian Focus, 2011)
- New Geneva Study Bible (NKJV, Thomas Nelson, 1995; updated, revised, and expanded edition republished as Reformation Study Bible, Reformation Trust, 2016; ESV edition published as Reformation Study Bible, Ligonier, 2005; Reformation Trust, 2015)
- Choosing My Religion (Baker, 1996; P&R, 2005)
- The Invisible Hand: Do All Things Really Work for Good? (Word, 1996; P&R, 2003)
- Ultimate Issues (Baker, 1996; P&R, 2005)
- The King Without a Shadow (Chariot, 1996; P&R, 2001)
- Now, That's a Good Question! (Tyndale, 1996)
- Grace Unknown: The Heart of Reformed Theology (Baker, 1997; republished as What is Reformed Theology: Understanding the Basics, Baker, 2005, 2016)
- Willing to Believe: Understanding the Role of the Human Will in Salvation (Baker, 1997, 2018)
- The Priest with Dirty Clothes (Tommy Nelson, 1997; Reformation Trust, 2011)
- The Last Days According to Jesus: When Did Jesus Say He Would Return? (Baker, 1998, 2015)
- Getting the Gospel Right: The Tie That Binds Evangelicals Together (Baker, 1999, 2017)
- In the Presence of God: Devotional Readings On the Attributes Of God (Word, 1999)
- A Walk with God: An Exposition of Luke (Christian Focus, 1999)
- Justified by Faith Alone (Crossway, 1999, 2010)
- Growing in Holiness: Understanding God's Role and Yours (Baker, 2000; published and released posthumously by Baker, 2020)
- The Consequences of Ideas: Understanding the Concepts That Shaped Our World (Crossway, 2000, 2009, 2018, 2025)
- Loved by God (W Publishing Group, 2001)
- What's in the Bible: The Story of God through Time and Eternity (Word, 2001)
- Five Things Every Christian Needs to Grow (W Publishing Group, 2002; revised and expanded edition published by Reformation Trust, 2008)
- Saved from What? (Crossway, 2002; Ligonier, 2021; republished as The Great Rescue, Ligonier, 2024)
- When Worlds Collide: Where is God? (Crossway, 2002)
- The Dark Side of Islam (Crossway, 2003, 2015)
- Running the Race: A Graduate's Guide to What's Important in Life (Baker, 2003)
- Defending Your Faith: An Introduction to Apologetics (Crossway, 2003, 2018, 2025)
- Scripture Alone: The Evangelical Doctrine (P&R, 2005)
- The Lightlings (Reformation Trust, 2006)
- A Taste of Heaven: Worship in the Light of Eternity (Reformation Trust, 2006; republished as How Then Shall We Worship?: Biblical Principles to Guide Us Today, David C. Cook, 2013)
- Truths We Confess: A Layman's Guide to the Westminster Confession of Faith (Vol. 1, The Triune God, Vol. 2, Salvation and the Christian Life, Vol. 3, The State, the Family, the Church, and Last Times, P&R, 2006–2007; single-volume revised edition published as Truths We Confess: A Systematic Exposition of the Westminster Confession of Faith, Reformation Trust, 2019)
- The Truth of the Cross (Reformation Trust, 2007)
- The Prince's Poison Cup (Reformation Trust, 2008)
- The Prayer of the Lord (Reformation Trust, 2009)
- The Barber Who Wanted to Pray (Crossway, 2011)
- Unseen Realities: Heaven, Hell, Angels and Demons (Christian Focus, 2011)
- The Donkey Who Carried a King (Reformation Trust, 2012)
- Are We Together?: A Protestant Analyzes Roman Catholicism (Reformation Trust, 2012)
- God's Love: How the Infinite God Cares for His Children (David C. Cook, 2012)
- The Work of Christ: What the Events of Jesus' Life Mean for You (David C. Cook, 2012, 2018)
- The Promises of God: Discovering the One Who Keeps His Word (David C. Cook, 2013, 2018)
- Everyone's a Theologian: An Introduction to Systematic Theology (Reformation Trust, 2014)
- The Knight's Map (Reformation Trust, 2016)
- The Legacy of Luther (Reformation Trust, 2016)

==== Books published posthumously ====
Posthumous works are derived from prior teaching content, sometimes with additional aid from Vesta Sproul.

- Moses and the Burning Bush (Reformation Trust, 2018)
- Luther and the Reformation (Ligonier, 2021)
- Hard Sayings: Understanding Difficult Passages of Scripture (Ligonier, 2023)
- The Advent of Glory: 24 Devotions for Christmas (Ligonier, 2023)
- Joseph: From Dreamer to Deliverer (Ligonier, 2024)
- The Power of the Gospel: A Year in Romans (Ligonier, 2024)
- Holy Week: The Week That Changed the World (Ligonier, 2025)

=== Crucial Questions series ===
- Who Is Jesus? (Reformation Trust, 2009; Ligonier, 2019) (Note: Originally published in 1983 by Tyndale.)
- Can I Trust the Bible? (Reformation Trust, 2009; Ligonier, 2019) (Note: Originally published by the International Council on Biblical Inerrancy in 1980 and 1996.)
- How Should I Live in This World? (Reformation Trust, 2009; Ligonier, 2019) (Note: Originally published by Tyndale in 1983 as Ethics and the Christian.)
- Can I Know God's Will? (Reformation Trust, 2009; Ligonier, 2019) (Note: Originally published by Tyndale in 1984 as God's Will and the Christian.)
- Does Prayer Change Things? (Reformation Trust, 2009; Ligonier, 2019) (Note: Originally published by Tyndale in 1984 as Effective Prayer.)
- Can I Be Sure I'm Saved? (Reformation Trust, 2010; Ligonier, 2019)
- What Does It Mean to Be Born Again? (Reformation Trust, 2010; Ligonier, 2019)
- What Is Faith? (Reformation Trust, 2010; Ligonier, 2019)
- What Is Baptism? (Reformation Trust, 2011; Ligonier, 2019)
- What Is the Trinity? (Reformation Trust, 2011; Ligonier, 2019)
- What Can I Do with My Guilt? (Reformation Trust, 2011; Ligonier, 2019)
- Can I Have Joy in My Life? (Reformation Trust, 2012; Ligonier, 2019)
- Who Is the Holy Spirit? (Reformation Trust, 2012; Ligonier, 2019)
- Does God Control Everything? (Reformation Trust, 2012; Ligonier, 2019)
- What is the Church? (Reformation Trust, 2013; Ligonier, 2019)
- What Is the Lord's Supper? (Reformation Trust, 2013; Ligonier, 2019)
- How Can I Develop a Christian Conscience? (Reformation Trust, 2013; Ligonier, 2019)
- What Is the Relationship between Church and State? (Reformation Trust, 2014; Ligonier, 2019)
- What Is Repentance? (Reformation Trust, 2014; Ligonier, 2019)
- Are These the Last Days? (Reformation Trust, 2014; Ligonier, 2019)
- What Is the Great Commission? (Reformation Trust, 2015; Ligonier, 2019)
- Can I Lose My Salvation? (Reformation Trust, 2015; Ligonier, 2019)
- How Should I Think About Money? (Reformation Trust, 2016; Ligonier, 2019)
- How Can I Be Blessed? (Reformation Trust, 2016; Ligonier, 2019)
- Are People Basically Good? (Reformation Trust, 2016; Ligonier, 2019)
- What Do Jesus' Parables Mean? (Reformation Trust, 2017; Ligonier, 2019)
- What Can We Know About God? (Reformation Trust, 2017; Ligonier, 2019)
- How Can I Be Right with God? (Reformation Trust, 2017; Ligonier, 2019)
- Was the Reformation Necessary? (R. C. Sproul Trust, 2024; Ligonier, 2024)

==== Crucial Questions books published posthumously ====
- Does God Exist? (Ligonier, 2019)
- How Does God's Law Apply to Me? (Ligonier, 2019)
- What Is Predestination? (Ligonier, 2019)
- Why Should I Join a Church? (Ligonier, 2019)

=== St. Andrew's Expositional Commentary series ===
- John (Crossway, 2009; republished as John: An Expositional Commentary, Reformation Trust, 2019)
- Romans (Crossway, 2009; republished as Romans: An Expositional Commentary, Reformation Trust, 2019)
- Acts (Crossway, 2010; republished as Acts: An Expositional Commentary, Reformation Trust, 2019)
- Mark (Crossway, 2011; republished as Mark: An Expositional Commentary, Reformation Trust, 2019)
- 1–2 Peter (Crossway, 2011; republished as 1–2 Peter: An Expositional Commentary, Reformation Trust, 2019)
- Matthew (Crossway, 2013; republished as Matthew: An Expositional Commentary, Reformation Trust, 2019)

=== Tabletalk Magazine compilations ===
- Before the Face of God (Book 1, Book 2, Book 3, Book 4, Baker, 1992–1996)
- Doubt and Assurance (Baker, 1993)
- Right Now Counts Forever (Reformation Trust, 2021)
