= Trajecta =

- Discipline: History of Religion in the Low Countries
- Language: Dutch, English, German

Publication details
- History: 1992-present
- Publisher: vzw Trajecta (Netherlands)
- Frequency: biannual

Standard abbreviations
- ISO 4: Trajecta

Indexing
- ISSN: 0778-8304

Links
- Journal homepage

Trajecta: Religion, Culture and Society in the Low Countries is a biannual peer-reviewed academic journal for the history of religion in the Low Countries (Belgium and the Netherlands).

== History ==
Trajecta was founded in 1992, initially as a quarterly journal, as the successor to Archief voor de geschiedenis van de katholieke kerk in Nederland (Archive for the history of the Catholic Church in the Netherlands), published from 1959 to 1991. This had itself been created by the merger of two earlier journals for the history of specific bishoprics: Archief voor de geschiedenis van het aartsbisdom Utrecht (1874-1958) and Bijdragen voor de geschiedenis van het bisdom van Haarlem (1873-1958). A third diocesan history journal, Bossche Bijdragen (1917-1971) joined in 1972.

Trajecta was innovative in deliberately extending the earlier journal's focus from the Netherlands to both the Netherlands and Belgium, with Dutch and Belgian scholars getting equal representation on the editorial board. The original focus on Catholic Church history was broadened to the History of Religion in 2013.

== Special issues ==
- Trajecta 13 (2004): special issue, in honour of Professor Jan Roes, on Catholicism and modernity in the second half of the 20th century.
- Trajecta 15/1-2 (2006): double issue on Catholicism and anti-semitism in the Netherlands and Belgium.
