= David VanDrunen =

American theologian and academic

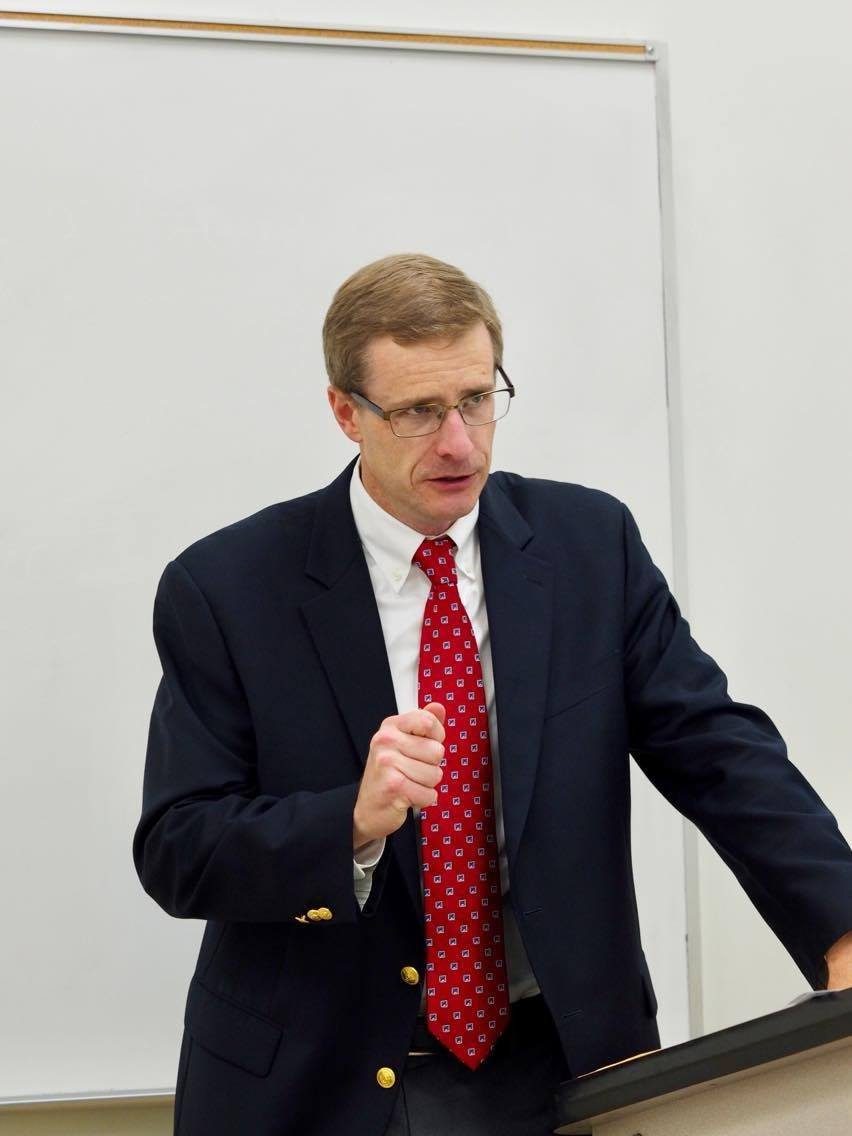
David VanDrunen

David M. VanDrunen (born December 21, 1971) is the Robert B. Strimple Professor of Systematic Theology and Christian Ethics at Westminster Seminary California. VanDrunen was the 2004 recipient of the Acton Institute's Novak Award, a visiting fellow at the Center for the Study of Law and Religion at Emory University in 2009, and a Henry Luce III Fellow in Theology for the 2016–2017 academic year.

VanDrunen received a B.A. from Calvin College, an M.Div. from Westminster Seminary California, a Th.M. from Trinity Evangelical Divinity School, a J.D. from Northwestern University, and a Ph.D. from Loyola University Chicago. He is an ordained minister in the Orthodox Presbyterian Church and a voluntarily inactive licensed attorney in the state of Illinois.

VanDrunen's work focuses on natural law and the doctrine of the two kingdoms. His Reformed political theology develops the traditional doctrine of the two kingdoms by grounding it in the divine administration of common grace under the Noahic covenant. In the late 2010s, his work has focused on developing the connection between the natural law and the law of Christ.

== Publications ==
- Law and Custom: The Thought of Thomas Aquinas and the Future of the Common Law (2003) ISBN 0-8204-6820-7
- The Pattern Of Sound Doctrine: Systematic Theology At The Westminster Seminaries: Essays in Honor of Robert B. Strimple (2004, edited) ISBN 0-87552-717-5
- A Biblical Case for Natural Law (2006) ASIN B009E9BE6W
- Bioethics and the Christian Life (2009) ISBN 978-1-4335-0144-9
- Natural Law and the Two Kingdoms (2010) ISBN 978-0-8028-6443-7
- Living in God's Two Kingdoms: A Biblical Vision for Christianity and Culture (2010) ISBN 978-1-4335-1404-3
- Law and the Bible: Justice, Mercy and Legal Institutions (2013, edited with Robert F. Cochran, Jr.) ISBN 978-0830825738
- Divine Covenants and Moral Order: A Biblical Theology of Natural Law (2014) ISBN 978-0-8028-7094-0
- God's Glory Alone: The Majestic Heart of Christian Faith and Life (2015) ISBN 978-0310515807
- Aquinas Among the Protestants (2017, edited with Manfred Svensson) ISBN 978-1119265948
- Politics After Christendom (2020) ISBN 978-0310108849
- Natural Law: A Short Companion (2023) ISBN 978-1087775418
