= Ligonier Ministries =

American Christian organization

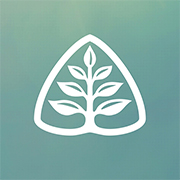
- Formation: 1971
- Founder: R. C. Sproul
- Founded at: Ligonier, Pennsylvania
- Type: Non-profit
- Headquarters: Sanford, Florida
- Chairman: W. Robert Godfrey
- President and CEO: Chris Larson
- Website: www.ligonier.org

Ligonier Ministries (also known as simply Ligonier) is an international Christian discipleship organization headquartered in the greater Orlando, Florida area. Ligonier was founded in 1971 by R. C. Sproul in the Ligonier Valley, Pennsylvania, outside of Pittsburgh. Ligonier is distinguished by its teaching of magisterial Reformed theology.

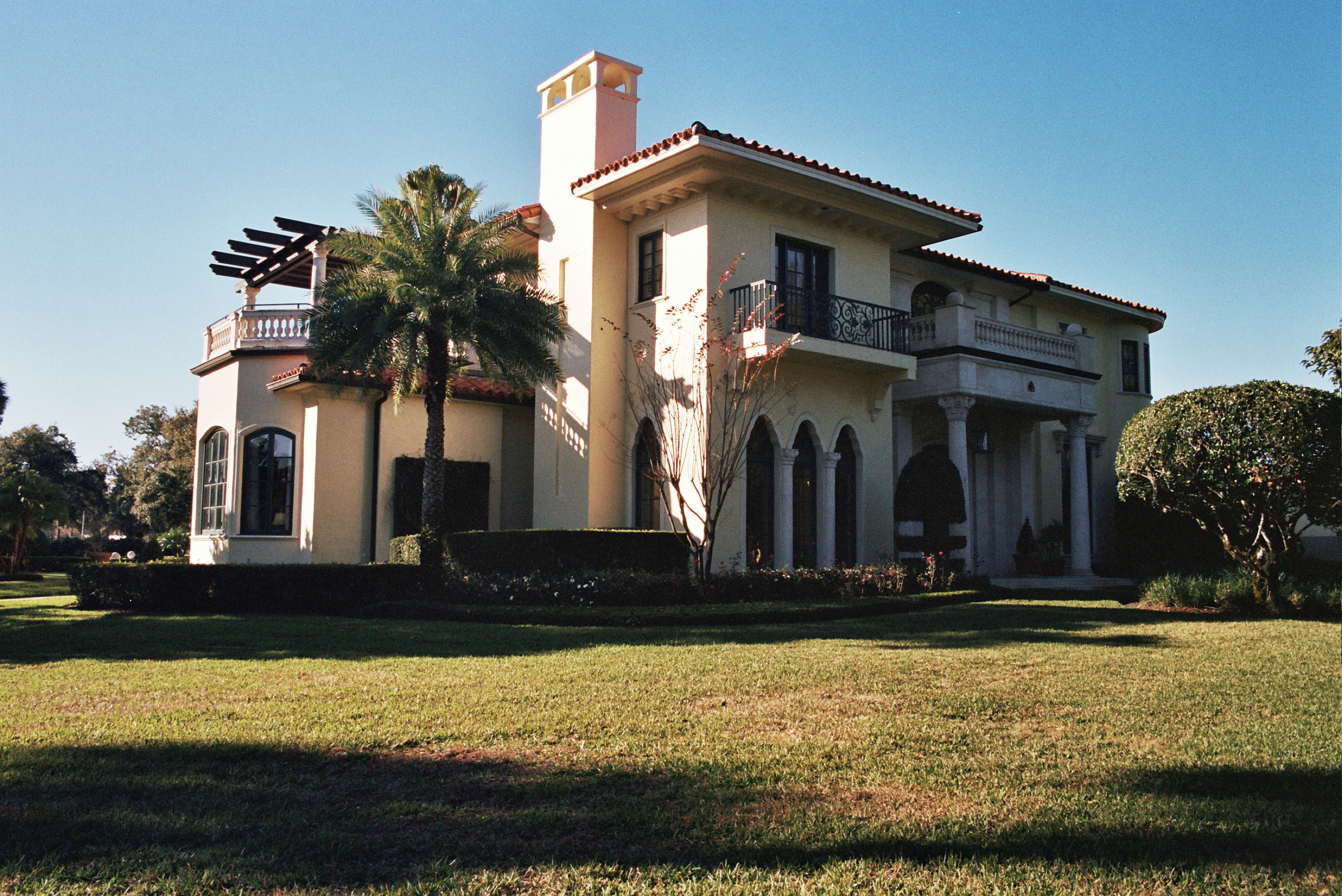
Ligonier Ministries' headquarters near Sanford, Florida

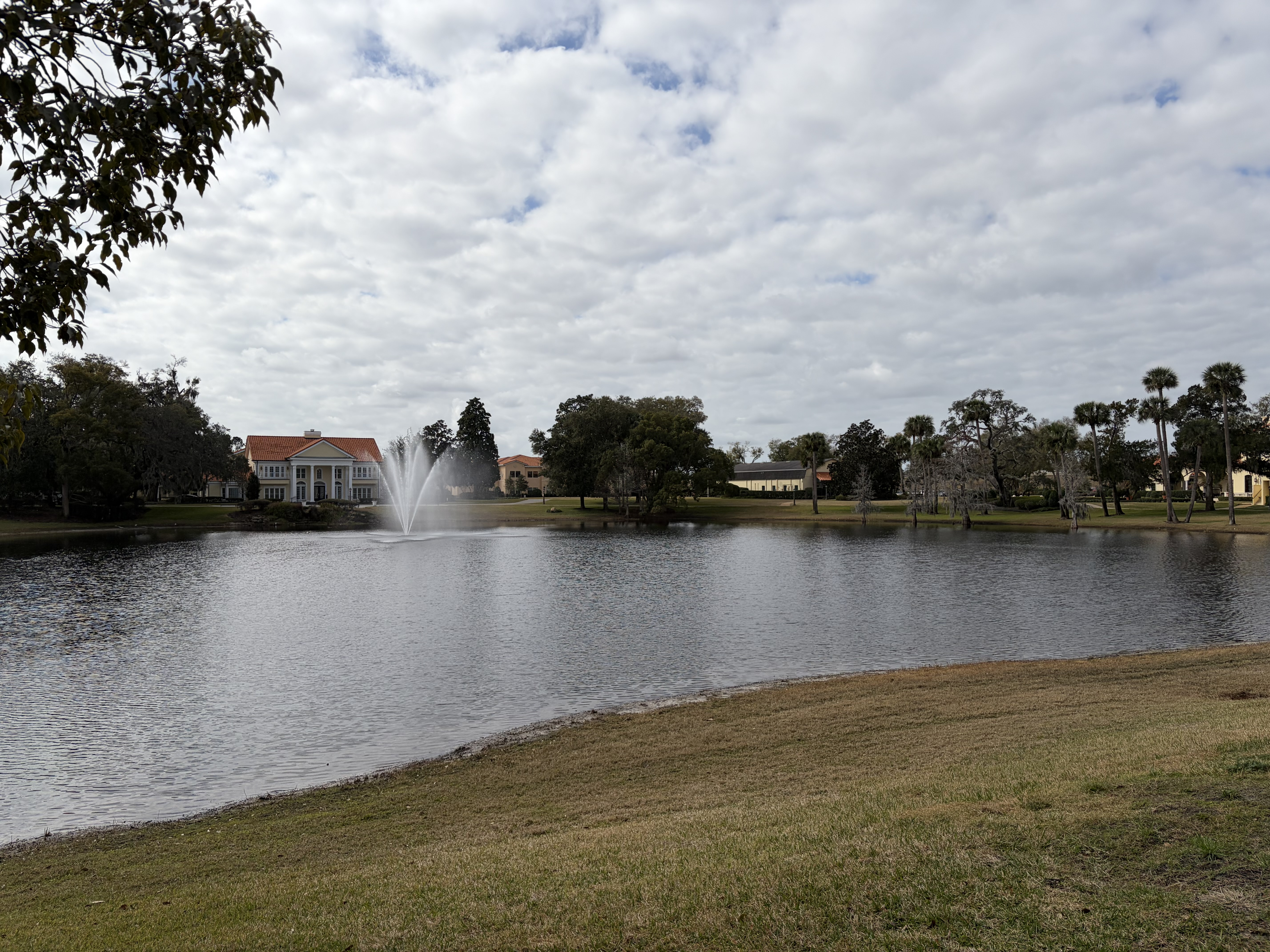
The campus of Reformation Bible College, founded by R. C. Sproul

Ligonier operates Reformation Bible College, which offers an unaccredited (Note: With regard to accreditation, former Reformation Bible College president Stephen Nichols states the following: "One of the accrediting associations to which many Bible colleges belong, the Association for Biblical Higher Education (ABHE), formerly required member institutions to have thirty credit hours of biblical and theological instruction. Recent standards have relaxed that threshold. Historically, Bible colleges have not had robust programs in the humanities and great works, and they have tended not to be Reformed. Bible colleges trace their roots to the Bible institute movement of the early twentieth century, a movement rooted in fundamentalism and dispensationalism.") Bachelor of Arts in Theology as its flagship program, which is recognized by Westminster Theological Seminary, an accredited organization. Ligonier also runs annual national conferences on various topics.

On February 28, 2016, Ligonier announced the publication of the Ligonier Statement on Christology which is a statement covering the topic of Christology.

== Teaching fellows ==
As of March 2026, the teaching fellows at Ligonier Ministries are the following:

- Sinclair Ferguson (Chancellor's Professor of Systematic Theology, Reformed Theological Seminary)
- W. Robert Godfrey (president emeritus, professor emeritus of church history, Westminster Seminary California)
- Joel Kim (president, assistant professor of New Testament, Westminster Seminary California)
- Burk Parsons (senior pastor, Saint Andrew's Chapel, Sanford, FL)
- Michael Reeves (president, professor of theology, Union School of Theology)
- Derek Thomas (Chancellor's Professor of Systematic and Pastoral Theology, Reformed Theological Seminary)

=== Fellowship history ===
In early 2010, working to prepare for leadership succession, Ligonier founder and chairman R. C. Sproul appointed Sinclair Ferguson, W. Robert Godfrey, Steven Lawson, and R. C. Sproul Jr. as the first members of a new teaching fellowship. In 2013, Stephen Nichols was appointed as a fellow, where in 2014 he was named president of Reformation Bible College and chief academic officer for Ligonier. In 2015, an email address belonging to Sproul Jr. was leaked as part of the July 2015 Ashley Madison data breach. Sproul Jr. claims that he visited the website in August 2014, two and a half years after the death of his wife. After informing the board of Ligonier, Sproul Jr. was suspended from ministry for a year. In late 2015, Albert Mohler and Derek Thomas were appointed as fellows. In December 2016, Sproul Jr. contacted Sproul and the Ligonier board to resign from his positions at Ligonier and Reformation Bible College, citing "personal reasons." In 2017, Burk Parsons was appointed as a fellow. After Sproul's death in December 2017, Mohler concluded his fellowship tenure in early 2019. In late 2024, Lawson resigned from his position after confessing to a five-year relational affair. In January 2026, Joel Kim and Michael Reeves were appointed as fellows.

In 2019, Ligonier teaching fellow Burk Parsons, the senior pastor of independent Reformed church Saint Andrew's Chapel (SAC), (Note: Saint Andrew's Chapel was founded in 1997 by the late R. C. Sproul. In 2011, Ligonier relocated its offices to the SAC site in Sanford, Florida.) pled guilty to charges surrounding harsh treatment of congregants. In 2023, SAC joined the Presbyterian Church in America (PCA), where Parsons stated, "We need to have that accountability. I made it very clear to our people in preaching. I said, they need to be in a position to be able to take me to court. And they need to be in a position to bring charges against me and bring charges against our elders."

On June 12, 2025, Parsons was found guilty on three charges by a commission of the PCA Central Florida presbytery, involving "domineering [and] contentious leadership ... being harsh, ungentle, and unkind to those under his care ... [and] slandering and demeaning other [ministers] and churches." Parsons pled not guilty to all three charges, where SAC appealed the verdict. On December 14, 2025, before the completion of the appeal process, SAC voted 669–108 to leave the PCA. An elder of SAC resigned from the church. The SAC session rejected the resignation and excommunicated the elder under the charge of contumacy. It also excommunicated a former Ligonier and Reformation Bible College senior official and his wife under the same charge after they resigned their membership following SAC's departure from the PCA.
