= Michael Horton (theologian) =

American theologian and academic (born 1964)

Michael S. Horton
- Born: May 11, 1964 (age 62)
- Occupations: Professor, Theologian, Author
- Years active: 1998–Present
- Known for: Modern Reformation Magazine, White Horse Inn radio program
- Awards: Honorary Doctor of Divinity, Grove City College (2016)

Academic background
- Education: Biola University (BA), Westminster Seminary California (MA), Wycliffe Hall, Oxford and University of Coventry (PhD)
- Thesis: Thomas Goodwin and the Puritan doctrine of assurance : continuity and discontinuity in the Reformed Tradition, 1600-1680 (1998)
- Influences: John Calvin, Reformation Theology, Early Church Fathers

Academic work
- Institutions: Westminster Seminary California (Professor)
- Main interests: Systematic Theology, Apologetics, Historical Theology
- Notable works: Shaman and Sage: The Roots of “Spiritual but Not Religious” in Antiquity (2024); Justification (2 Vols, 2018); Rediscovering the Holy Spirit (2017); The Christian Faith: A Systematic Theology for Pilgrims on the Way (2011); Calvin on the Christian Life (2014)

Michael Scott Horton (born May 11, 1964) is an American Reformed systematic theology scholar. He is the J. Gresham Machen Professor of Systematic Theology and Apologetics at Westminster Seminary California. Horton has written and edited more than forty books and contributed to various encyclopedias, including the Oxford Handbook of Reformed Theology and Brill's Encyclopedia of Christianity.

In addition to his work as a professor, Horton is the founder of Sola Media and its productions, the White Horse Inn radio show and podcast, Modern Reformation magazine, Core Christianity, and Theo Global.

His most recent book is Shaman and Sage: The Roots of “Spiritual but Not Religious” in Antiquity, the first of three volumes in his intellectual history of “spiritual but not religious” as a phenomenon in Western culture.

== History ==
Horton was raised in an Arminian Baptist church. While in high school, Horton adopted Calvinistic beliefs as he read through the Bible, specifically the book of Romans. Horton claims he "threw his Bible across the room" as he read through Romans 9 and began to wrestle through the doctrines of election/predestination and the sovereignty of God. He began attending the Philadelphia Conference on Reformed Theology, where he met James Montgomery Boice, R.C. Sproul, and J.I. Packer.

Horton received a BA degree at Biola University. Since high school, he had always known that he wanted to go to Westminster Theological Seminary in Philadelphia. At the time, Westminster Seminary California was just starting in a small storefront in Escondido but many of the men Horton was reading at the time taught there, and this eventually led to his choice to get his MA there. He learned Biblical Hebrew and Koine Greek, and studied under Meredith Kline.

Horton received his PhD from Wycliffe Hall, Oxford through Coventry University and completed a research fellowship at Yale Divinity School.

He was ordained a deacon in the Reformed Episcopal Church. He was the president of Christians United for Reformation (CURE), which later merged to become the Alliance of Confessing Evangelicals (ACE). From 2001 to 2004 Horton served as the president of ACE, but is now no longer affiliated with that organization. He is also an ordained minister in the United Reformed Churches in North America (URCNA), has served at two churches in Southern California, and was the Associate Pastor at Christ United Reformed Church in Santee, California, a URCNA member church. Horton taught an adult Sunday school class on God, suffering, sanctification, Calvinist theology, and the basics of the Heidelberg Catechism.

In 1996 Christianity Today included him on their list of "Up & Comers: Fifty evangelical leaders 40 and under."

== List of works ==
- The Agony of Deceit: What Some TV Preachers Are Really Teaching (1990)
- Putting Amazing Back Into Grace (2011)
- Beyond Culture Wars: Is America A Mission Field or Battlefield? (1994)
- Where In The World Is The Church: Understanding Culture & Your Role In It (1995)
- Power Religion: The Selling Out of The Evangelical Church, edited with Charles Colson (1997)
- Made In America: The Shaping of Modern American Evangelicalism (1991)
- We Believe: Recovering the Essentials of the Apostle's Creed (1998)
- Covenant and Eschatology (2002)
- A Better Way: Rediscovering the Drama of God-Centered Worship (2003)
- The Law of Perfect Freedom (2004)
- Lord and Servant: A Covenant Christology (2005)
- Covenant & Salvation: Union with Christ (2007)
- Christless Christianity: The Alternative Gospel of the American Church (2012)
- People and Place: A Covenant Ecclesiology (2008; 2009 Christianity Today Book Award in Theology/Ethics)
- Too Good to be True: Finding Hope in a World of Hype (2009)
- God of Promise: Introducing Covenant Theology (2009)
- The Gospel-Driven Life: Being Good News People in a Bad News World (2009)
- The Christian Faith: A Systematic Theology for Pilgrims on the Way (2011)
- Pilgrim Theology: Core Doctrine for Christian Disciples (2011)
- For Calvinism, with Maurice England (2011)
- The Gospel Commission (2012)
- Calvin on the Christian Life: Glorifying and Enjoying God Forever, Theologians on the Christian Life, 2014.
- Rediscovering the Holy Spirit: God's Perfecting Presence in Creation, Redemption, and Everyday Life (2017)
- Justification (2 Vols), New Studies in Dogmatics, 2018, ISBN 978-0310597254.

== See also ==
- Cambridge Declaration
