= List of Westminster Theological Seminary people =

Notable faculty, staff, and alumni from Westminster Theological Seminary

The following is a list of notable faculty, staff, and alumni of Westminster Theological Seminary in Pennsylvania, USA.

== Faculty ==
Current and past resident faculty members include:

=== Presidents ===
- Edmund Clowney (1966-1984)
- George C. Fuller (1984-1991)
- Samuel T. Logan (1991-2005)
- Peter Lillback (from 2005 to 2026)
- David B. Garner (2026-)

=== Professors ===
- Jay E. Adams
- Oswald Thompson Allis
- Gregory Beale
- Stephen Coleman
- Harvie M. Conn
- Brandon Crowe
- John Currie
- D. Clair Davis
- Ray Dillard
- Iain Duguid
- William Edgar
- Rob Edwards
- Peter Enns
- Sinclair Ferguson
- Sandy Finlayson
- John Frame
- Richard Gaffin
- Richard Gamble
- David Garner
- John Gerstner
- Jonathan Gibson
- Robert Godfrey
- Douglas Green
- Douglas Gropp
- J. Alan Groves
- Elizabeth Groves
- R. Laird Harris
- D. G. Hart
- Philip Edgecumbe Hughes
- Kent Hughes
- Timothy J. Keller
- Rienk Kuiper
- Peter Lillback
- Tremper Longman
- John Gresham Machen
- Allan MacRae
- Dan McCartney
- Jack Miller
- John Murray
- K. Scott Oliphint
- Manuel Ortiz
- Alfred Poirier
- Vern Poythress
- O. Palmer Robertson
- Norman Shepherd
- Moisés Silva
- John Skilton
- Ned Bernard Stonehouse
- Lane Tipton
- Carl R. Trueman
- Chad Van Dixhoorn
- Cornelius Van Til
- Bruce Waltke
- Robert Dick Wilson
- Timothy Witmer
- Paul Woolley
- Carlton Wynne
- Edward Joseph Young

== Alumni ==
- Greg Bahnsen
- Susan Wise Bauer
- Alistair Begg
- Ralph Blair
- Robert M. Bowman, Jr.
- Anthony Bradley
- Eugene S. Callender
- Edward John Carnell
- Stafford Carson
- Jack Cottrell
- Percy Crawford
- Glenn Davies, Anglican Archbishop of Sydney
- Chad Van Dixhoorn
- Bob Fu
- Mariano Di Gangi
- John Gerstner
- Michael Goheen
- Bruce L. Gordon
- T. David Gordon
- Mark Gornik
- Wayne Grudem
- Allan Harman
- Theophilus Herter
- Edward F. Hills
- Paul Jewett
- James B. Jordan
- John Euiwhan Kim
- Meredith Kline
- William L. Lane
- Peter Leithart
- Andrew T. Lincoln
- Richard Lovelace
- George Marsden
- Carl McIntire
- J. Ramsey Michaels
- Bruce Miller
- Robert Morey
- John Muether
- Harold Ockenga
- Yun Sun Park
- David Powlison
- Richard L. Pratt, Jr.
- W. Stanford Reid
- H. Evan Runner
- Philip Ryken
- Francis Schaeffer
- Moisés Silva
- James Skillen
- Robert Sungenis
- Robert L. Thoburn
- Geoff Thomas
- Kevin Vanhoozer
- Marten Woudstra

== Honorary Doctorates ==
- Alistair Begg
- Glenn Davies - An Archbishop in Australia
- Wayne Grudem
- Os Guinness
- David Estrada-Herrero
- Lee Jong-Yun - Founding pastor of Seoul Presbyterian Church, a megachurch in Seoul, Korea
- Won Sang Lee - The late pastor of Korean Central Presbyterian Church, a megachurch in Virginia.
- Oak Han-heum - The late pastor of SaRang Community Church a megachurch in Seoul, Korea.
- James I. Packer - Theologian
- Park Yun-sun - Korean scholar who wrote a commentary on every book of the Bible and taught at Chongshin University and founded Hapdong Theological Seminary.
- James W. Skillen - President of Center for Public Justice
- R.C. Sproul - Theologian
- Joni Eareckson Tada - Christian author and disabilities advocate
- John Templeton - President of John Templeton Foundation
- Stephen Tong - Evangelist and pastor of Messiah Cathedral the largest church in Southeast Asia.
- Paul Wells - President of the Federation of Francophone Evangelical theologians
