= Jack Miller (pastor) =

American pastor and author (1928-1996)

C. John "Jack" Miller
- Born: December 28, 1928; Gold Beach, Oregon, U.S.
- Died: April 8, 1996 (aged 67); Málaga, Spain
- Education: San Francisco State College (B.A., 1953); Westminster Theological Seminary (M.Div., 1966); University of the Pacific (Ph.D., 1968)
- Occupation: Presbyterian pastor · Seminary professor · Church planter · Mission leader
- Years active: 1955–1996
- Organizations: Westminster Theological Seminary; New Life Presbyterian Church; World Harvest Mission (Serge)
- Known for: Founder of World Harvest Mission (now Serge); pastor of New Life Presbyterian Church (Jenkintown, PA); practical theology professor at Westminster Theological Seminary
- Notable work: Outgrowing the Ingrown Church (1986); Repentance (1975); A Faith Worth Sharing (1999); The Heart of a Servant Leader (letters, 2004)
- Spouse: Rose Marie Miller (m. 1950–1996)
- Children: Five

Cecil John Miller (December 28, 1928 – April 8, 1996), usually known as Jack Miller, was an American Presbyterian pastor, seminary professor, church planter, and missionary. He served as pastor of New Life Presbyterian Church in Jenkintown, Pennsylvania, taught practical theology at Westminster Theological Seminary, and was the founder of World Harvest Mission, now Serge.

== Early life and education ==
Miller was born on December 28, 1928, in Gold Beach, Oregon. He married Rose Marie Carlsen in 1950, and graduated from San Francisco State College in 1953. In 1966 he received an M.Div. from Westminster Theological Seminary and in 1968 earned his Ph.D. in English literature from the University of the Pacific.

== Career ==
Starting in 1955, Miller taught at Ripon Christian School for five years in Ripon, California. He was ordained as a minister in the Orthodox Presbyterian Church in 1959, and worked as a chaplain for several years in Stockton, California. From 1965-1972 he served as the pastor of Mechanicsville Chapel in Mechanicsville, Pennsylvania. He taught practical theology at Westminster Theological Seminary from 1966-1980, and was the pastor of New Life Presbyterian Church in Jenkintown, Pennsylvania from 1973-1990.

Miller founded World Harvest Mission (now named Serge) and the New Life Presbyterian network of Orthodox Presbyterian churches. He was known for emphasizing the Christian's status as a child of God.

Biographer Michael Graham notes that Miller summed up the gospel in this way: "Cheer up! You’re far worse than you know, but Cheer up! God’s grace is greater than you have ever dared hope.” The whole of Jack Miller’s life and ministry can be summarized by four additional Cheer up statements: Cheer up! God’s Spirit Works in Your Weakness; Cheer up! Justification is by Faith Alone Even in the Twentieth Century; Cheer up! God’s Kingdom is Greater than You Ever Imagined; Cheer Up; Come on Let’s Die Together—It’s a Great Way to Come to Life. These six Cheer up statements provide the chapter titles of the biography ‘Cheer Up!’ outlining Jack’s life and ministry.

Miller wrote a number of books, most notably Outgrowing the Ingrown Church (1986). A volume of his letters, The Heart of a Servant Leader, was published in 2004. Miller also wrote: ‘Repentance’ (2009), ‘Evangelism & Your Church’ (1980), ‘Come Back, Barbara’ (Co-Authored with his daughter Barbara Juliani, 1988), ‘Power Evangelism for the Powerless (1997), and ‘A Faith Worth Sharing: A Lifetime of Conversations about Christ’ (1999)

Miller’s wife Rose Marie has also authored several books including ‘From Fear to Freedom: Living as Sons and Daughters of God’ (1994), and ‘Nothing is Impossible with God: Reflections on Weakness, Faith, and Power’ (2015).

Miller’s son Paul E. Miller has authored several books including ‘Love Walked Among Us: Learning to Love Like Jesus’ (2001), ‘A Praying Life: Connecting with God in a Distracting World (2000), and ‘A Praying Church: Becoming a People with Hope in a Discouraging World’ (2023).

In 2020, P&R Publishing released a biography written by Michael A. Graham titled Cheer Up! The Life and Ministry of Jack Miller.

The full extent of Jack Miller’s impact on a generation of pastors, church leaders, missionaries, and scholars throughout the United States and around the world in the late Twentieth and early Twenty-first century is difficult to fully measure. To name a few:

Timothy Keller, Senior Pastor of Redeemer Church (New York, NY), said about Jack Miller: “Kathy and I went to Gordon-Conwell Seminary together in the early ’70s and there studied under Richard Lovelace, whose teaching on revival and renewal had profoundly moved us and changed us personally. But we didn’t know how to translate it into local church ministry until we came under the influence of Jack and Rose Marie Miller during our stay in Philadelphia and New Life Church from 1984 to 1989. Then we began to see how gospel renewal fleshed itself out in preaching, worship, evangelism, missions, and social justice. Lovelace taught the theory, but Jack showed us the practice, and this ignited a desire in me to start a church and ministry where I could do what I learned at New Life. There would never have been a Redeemer Church in New York City without the impact of Jack and Rose Marie on our lives and hearts.”

Author and Speaker Joni Eareckson Tada said about Jack Miller: “When people see my wheelchair, and ask about my smile; when they wonder how I’m able to couple a strict orthodoxy with an infectious joy in Jesus, I often parrot a principle I learned years ago from Jack Miller who said, ‘Cheer up, the Spirit of Jesus is at work in your weakness.’ Jack helped me see that you could be a stalwart Calvinist and, at the same time, praise the Lord like a happy Pentecostal... even in the middle of pain and quadriplegia. Sound like a strange mix?”

Author Jerry Bridges said about Jack Miller: “I also owe a debt of gratitude to my friend Dr. Jack Miller, from whom I acquired the expression “Preach the gospel to yourself every day.” I had been doing that, somewhat out of necessity, for several years, but Dr. Miller helped bring that concept into sharper focus and more conscious application for me.”

== Criticism ==
Gary North was critical of Miller's techniques and argued that Miller was "deeply affected by the counter-culture", which led him to adopt new, people-oriented approaches to evangelism. Chad B. Van Dixhoorn suggested that Miller's Sonship program stemmed from three and a half months spent in Spain overlooking the Mediterranean Sea. Miller "studied the promises of Scripture for three and a half months culminating in a mountaintop experience, or its seaside equivalent. He returned to America with two things on his mind, adoption and revival." Along with Van Dixhoorn, other critics of Miller's Sonship theology included his one-time colleague at Westminster Seminary, Jay Adams. By contrast, Tim Trumper has taken a more positive view of Sonship theology in his book-length study.

== Death ==
Miller died on April 8, 1996, in Málaga, Spain.

== Publications ==
- Repentance and twentieth century man. (1975) (Later republished as: Repentance: A Daring Call to Real Surrender.)
- Evangelism and your church. (1980)
- Outgrowing the ingrown church. (1986)
- Come back, Barbara : a father's pursuit of a prodigal daughter. (with Barbara Miller Juliani) (1988)
- Powerful evangelism for the powerless. (1997)
- A faith worth sharing : a lifetime of conversations about Christ. (1999)
- The heart of a servant leader: letters from Jack Miller. (with Barbara Miller Juliani) (2004)
- Lectures from Jack Miller : the modern theological novel. (edited by Roseann Miller Trott) (2023)
