= John Gerstner =

American theologian and academic (1914 – 1996)

John Henry Gerstner
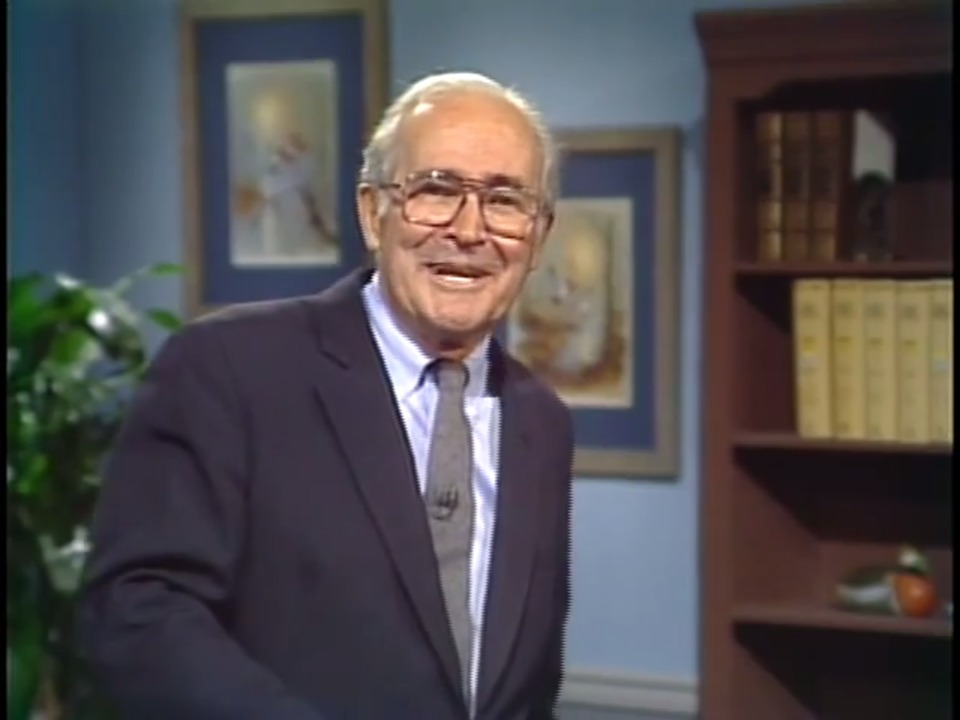
- Born: November 22, 1914; Tampa, Florida
- Died: March 24, 1996 (aged 81); Ligonier, Pennsylvania
- Occupation: Professor of Church History

Academic background
- Education: Westminster Theological Seminary, Harvard University

Academic work
- Discipline: Church History
- School or tradition: Reformed
- Institutions: Pittsburgh Theological Seminary; Knox Theological Seminary

Ecclesiastical career
- Religion: Christianity (Protestant)
- Church: UPCNA (until 1958); UPCUSA (1958–1983); PCUSA (1983–1990); PCA (1990–1996)

John Henry Gerstner (November 22, 1914 – March 24, 1996) was an American Reformed and Presbyterian theologian and professor of Church History at Pittsburgh Theological Seminary and Knox Theological Seminary. He was an expert on the life and theology of Jonathan Edwards.

== Career ==
Gerstner earned both a Master of Divinity degree and a Master of Theology degree from Westminster Theological Seminary. He earned his Doctor of Philosophy degree in Church History from Harvard University in 1945. He was originally ordained in the United Presbyterian Church of North America, then (due to church unions) with the United Presbyterian Church in the United States of America and the Presbyterian Church (USA). In 1990, he left the PCUSA for the Presbyterian Church in America.

Gerstner counted among his students noted author and preacher R. C. Sproul, founder of Ligonier Ministries; Dr. Arthur Lindsley, Senior Fellow at the C.S. Lewis Institute, Dr. Walter (Wynn) Kenyon, Professor of Biblical Studies and Philosophy, Chair of the Philosophy Department and Division of Ministry and Human Services at Belhaven University; Rev. Robert Ingram, founding board member and Headmaster of The Geneva School; and Dr. Mark Ross, the John R. de Witt Professor of Systematic Theology and Director of the Institute for Reformed Worship at Erskine Theological Seminary.

In addition to his books, Gerstner recorded several lengthy audio courses giving a survey of theology, church history, and Christian apologetics, which are distributed through Ligonier Ministries. Gerstner was non-dispensationalist.

In 1976, a Festschrift was published in Gerstner's honor. Soli Deo Gloria: Essays in Reformed Theology included contributions by Cornelius Van Til, J. I. Packer, Philip Edgecumbe Hughes, John Murray, R. C. Sproul, John Warwick Montgomery, and Roger Nicole.

== Works ==
=== Books ===
- Gerstner, John H. (1958). The Epistle to the Ephesians: A Study Manual. Shield Bible Study Series. Grand Rapids, MI: Baker Book House. OCLC 3596644.
- ——— (1959). Steps to Salvation: The Evangelistic Message of Jonathan Edwards. Philadelphia, PA: Westminster Press. OCLC 1284551.
- ——— (1960). Reasons for Faith. New York, NY: Harper. OCLC 1431880.
- ——— (1960). The Theology of the Major Sects. Grand Rapids, MI: Baker Book House. OCLC 261412.
- ——— (1960). A Predestination Primer. Grand Rapids, MI: Baker Book House. OCLC 2795930.
- ——— (1963) [1948]. The Gospel According to Rome (2nd ed.). Grand Rapids, MI: Baker Book House. OCLC 812525104.
- ——— (1965). A Bible Inerrancy Primer. Grand Rapids, MI: Baker Book House. OCLC 3124256.
- ——— (1978). The Teachings of Mormonism. Grand Rapids, MI: Baker Book House. ISBN 978-0-801-03719-1. OCLC 4559460.
- ——— (1978). The Teachings of Jehovah's Witnesses. Grand Rapids, MI: Baker Book House. ISBN 978-0-801-03718-4. OCLC 4458000.
- ——— (1978). The Teachings of Seventh-Day Adventism. Grand Rapids, MI: Baker Book House. ISBN 978-0-801-03720-7. OCLC 4546053.
- ——— (1980). Jonathan Edwards on Heaven and Hell. Grand Rapids, MI: Baker Book House. ISBN 978-0-801-03749-8. OCLC 6686333.
- ——— (1982). A Primer on Dispensationalism. Phillipsburg, NJ: Presbyterian and Reformed Pub. Co. ISBN 978-0-875-52273-9. OCLC 8934193.
- ———; Sproul, R. C.; Lindsley, Arthur (1984). Classical Apologetics: A Rational Defense of the Christian Faith and a Critique of Presuppositional Apologetics. Grand Rapids, MI: Zondervan. ISBN 978-0-310-44951-5. OCLC 10277371.
- ——— (1987). Jonathan Edwards: A Mini-Theology. Wheaton, IL: Tyndale House. ISBN 978-0-842-31956-0. OCLC 16104486.
- ——— (1990). Repent or Perish: With Special Reference to the Conservative Attack on Hell. Soli Deo Gloria Publications. ISBN 978-1-877-61114-8.
- ——— (1991). Wrongly Dividing the Word of Truth: A Critique of Dispensationalism. Brentwood, TN: Wolgemuth & Hyatt. ISBN 978-1-561-21021-3. OCLC 23253845.
- ——— (1991). The Rational Biblical Theology of Jonathan Edwards (in 3 volumes). Powhatan, VA: Berea Publications. OCLC 23470994.
- ——— (1995). Reasons for Duty. Soli Deo Gloria Publications. ISBN 978-1-573-58019-9.
- ——— (1995). Primer on Roman Catholicism. Soli Deo Gloria Publications. ISBN 9781573580137. OCLC 34209019.
- ——— (1997). Theology in Dialogue. Soli Deo Gloria Ministries. ISBN 978-1-573-58038-0.
- ——— (1997). Primitive Theology: The Collected Primers of John H. Gerstner. Soli Deo Gloria Publications. ISBN 978-1-573-58045-8.
- ——— (1998). The Early Writings of John H. Gerstner (2 volume set). Reformation Heritage Books. ISBN 978-1-573-58108-0.
- ——— (2001). The ABC's of Assurance. Soli Deo Gloria Publications. ISBN 978-1877611391.
- ——— (2003). Jonathan Edwards: Evangelist. Soli Deo Gloria Publications. ISBN 978-1-573-58006-9.

=== Chapters ===
- ——— (1961). "Christian Science". In Christianity Today (ed.). The Challenge of the Cults: a Christianity today symposium. Grand Rapids, MI: Zondervan. OCLC 3935669.
- ——— (1968). "The Message of the Word". In Tenney, Merrill C. (ed.). The Bible: the living word of revelation. Grand Rapids, MI: Zondervan. OCLC 183697.

== Festschrift ==
- Sproul, R. C., ed. (1976). Soli Deo Gloria: Essays in Reformed Theology: Festschrift for John H. Gerstner. Nutley, NJ: Presbyterian and Reformed Pub. Co. OCLC 3304866.
