= Sonship theology =

Protestant Christian theological movement

Sonship theology, also known as Sonship teaching, is a movement within American Presbyterianism, associated with Jack Miller (1928–1996).

== Meaning ==
Sonship theology emphasizes the Christian's adoption as a child of God. Tullian Tchividjian notes that Miller summed up the gospel in this way: "Cheer up; you're a lot worse off than you think you are, but in Jesus you're far more loved than you could have ever imagined."

Sonship theology was associated with a group of congregations within the Orthodox Presbyterian Church called "New Life Churches". In the 1990s, most of these congregations left the OPC to join the Presbyterian Church in America. Tim Keller suggests that they were "made to feel unwelcome" in the OPC, since their "pietist/revivalist" outlook "did not fit well with the more doctrinalist cast of the OPC." Gary North argued in 1991 that these churches "have not officially departed from confessional orthodoxy," but that "their focus has not been on traditional confessional preaching and Calvinist doctrine."

The theological foundation of Sonship theology has been summarized by its proponents as "sanctification by faith". E. Calvin Beisner notes that this phrase "is far more commonly associated with pietist, quietist, Wesleyan Holiness, or Keswick thought than with Reformed thought," but advocates of Sonship theology reject these ideas and see their approach as consistent with Reformed theology.

R. C. Sproul, Jr. notes that the movement has been criticized for being implicitly antinomian, for being too introspective, and for being a part of the higher life movement. Chad Van Dixhoorn argues that Sonship theology presents a distorted teaching on adoption, a truncated view of the Holy Spirit's work in sanctification, and a confused doctrine of revival. Van Dixhoorn examines Sonship: Discovering Liberty in the Gospel as Sons and Daughters of God, the course material produced by the organization which Miller founded, World Harvest Mission, now known as Serge. Van Dixhoorn concedes that "Sonship has succeeded admirably in emphasizing the sovereignty of God's grace," that it "is not skittish about sinfulness and depravity," and that it stresses "the close association between faith and repentance in the life of the believer." Van Dixhoorn concludes, however, that the course would have been better if it had balanced its teaching on Galatians with the teaching on assurance in 1 John, and if it had emphasized the "ordinary means" of grace, such as preaching and the sacraments, rather than extraordinary means, such as courses or conferences, to help Christians grow.

== See also ==
- Adoption (theology)
