= P&R Publishing =

- Founded: 1930
- Founder: Samuel G. Craig, J. Gresham Machen, and James Schrader
- Country of origin: United States
- Headquarters location: Phillipsburg, New Jersey
- Publication types: Books and eBooks
- Imprints: P&R Publishing, Presbyterian and Reformed Publishing Co.
- Official website: www.prpbooks.com

P&R Publishing is an evangelical, Reformed, Christian publishing company located in Phillipsburg, New Jersey. P&R publishes books that promote biblical concepts and Christian lifestyle according to the Westminster Confession of Faith and Catechisms.

== History ==
In 1930, Samuel G. Craig, J. Gresham Machen, and James Schrader founded Presbyterian and Reformed Publishing Co. P&R's initial publication was a 24-page monthly periodical called Christianity Today ("A Presbyterian Journal Devoted to Stating, Defending and Furthering the Gospel in the Modern World"). The periodical, which featured articles on Christianity and theology, book reviews, sermons, news in the Presbyterian church, and letters to the editor, was published intermittently until 1949. Its name was later adopted, with P&R's permission, by the evangelical periodical Christianity Today, which Billy Graham founded in 1956.

The first two books that P&R published were Oswald T. Allis's The Five Books of Moses (1943) and his Prophecy and the Church (1945). Allis, who taught in the Department of Semitic Philology at Princeton Theological Seminary from 1910–29 and who served as editor of the Princeton Theological Review from 1918 to 1929, along with Machen, Robert Dick Wilson, and others, founded Westminster Theological Seminary in 1929. Allis' books helped to set the standard and direction for P&R's subsequent publications.

In 1957, Charles H. Craig, Samuel's son, took over Presbyterian and Reformed's operations, running it out of his home in Nutley, New Jersey, and using an off-site building for shipping. In 1978, the company moved to its current location in Phillipsburg. In 1982, Bryce H. Craig, Charles' son and a graduate of Westminster Theological Seminary, became president. "Presbyterian and Reformed Publishing Co." was abbreviated to "P&R Publishing" in 1992.

P&R's approximately 700 titles range from academic works that advance biblical and theological scholarship to popular books designed to help lay readers grow in Christian thought and service.

== Authors ==
P&R Publishing has published significant works by numerous theologians including Cornelius Van Til, Jay E. Adams, John Frame, and Vern Poythress.

== Notable books ==
- Allis, Oswald T., The Five Books of Moses (1943)
- Allis, Oswald T., Prophecy and the Church (1943)
- Whitcomb, John C. & Morris, Henry M., The Genesis Flood (1961)
- Adams, Jay E., Competent to Counsel (1970)
- Sproul, R.C., The Symbol (1973)
- Frame, John M., The Doctrine of God (2002)
  - ECPA Gold Medallion Book Award Winner, 2003.
- Letham, Robert. The Holy Trinity (2004)
  - ECPA Gold Medallion Book Award Winner, 2005.
- Lillback, Peter A. and Gaffin, Richard B. (eds.), Thy Word Is Still Truth (2013)
- Frame, John M., Systematic Theology (2013)
  - WORLD magazine 2014 Books of the Year Winner.
- Frame, John M., A History of Western Philosophy and Theology (2017)
  - ECPA Gold Medallion Book Award Winner, 2017.

== Partner theological organizations ==
- African Bible University
- Alliance of Confessing Evangelicals
- Christian Counseling & Educational Foundation (CCEF)
- Covenant Theological Seminary
- Redeemer Seminary
- Reformed Theological Seminary
- Westminster Seminary California
- Westminster Theological Seminary (Philadelphia)
- Malawi Seminary

== Partner book ministries ==
- Action International Ministries (AIM)
- Africa Christian Textbooks (ACTS)
- Prison Book Program
- Prison Fellowship
- Theological Book Network (TBN)
