= John Kim =

John Kim may refer to:

- John Euiwhan Kim (1933–2010), American theologian and pastor
- John Harlan Kim (born 1993), Australian actor
- John Kim (professor) (born 1947), American professor of mechanical and aerospace engineering

== See also ==
- Jonathan Kim (born 1960), South Korean film producer
- Jonny Kim (born 1984), American Navy Seal, doctor, and astronaut
