= Richard Lovelace =

Richard Lovelace may refer to:

- Richard Lovelace (poet) (1617–1657), 17th century English poet
- Richard Lovelace, 1st Baron Lovelace (1564–1634)
- Richard F. Lovelace (1930–2020), American theologian
- Richard V. E. Lovelace (fl. 1960s–2010s), American astrophysicist
