= Gordon Keddie =

British theologian (1944–2023)

- Born: Gordon James Keddie; 29 December 1944; Edinburgh, Scotland
- Died: 19 May 2023 (aged 78); New Galilee, Pennsylvania
- Citizenship: British
- Education: George Heriot's School, Aberdeen University, University of Edinburgh, Westminster Theological Seminary, Reformed Presbyterian Theological Seminary
- Occupations: Minister, author
- Notable work: Biblical commentaries
- Movement: Reformed, Calvinism
- Spouse: Jane (McMillan) Keddie
- Children: Donald, Iain, and David

Gordon James Keddie (29 December 1944 – 19 May 2023) was a British-American pastor and theologian of the Reformed Presbyterian Church of North America educated at George Heriot's School, the University of Aberdeen, the University of Edinburgh, Westminster Theological Seminary, and the Reformed Presbyterian Theological Seminary. He served long pastorates in State College, Pennsylvania and Indianapolis, Indiana. He is best known for his extensive writings including many commentaries on books of the Bible that have been translated in multiple languages. His contributions to the Welwyn commentary series published by Evangelical Press, included eight volumes, providing commentaries on the biblical books of Numbers, Judges, Ruth, 1 and 2 Samuel, Amos, Jonah, Acts and the Epistle of James. He was also the author of a two volume work on the Gospel of John that is part of the Evangelical Press Study Commentary Series. Other works include treatments of the parables of Jesus, heaven, the book of Ecclesiastes, covenant theology, editing a collection of essays by 19th-century Reformed Presbyterian theologian James Renwick Willson, and various other contributions on topics in Reformed theology. Keddie died of prostate cancer on 19 May 2023, at the age of 78.

== Works ==
=== Author ===
- Even in Darkness - Judges: Judges and Ruth simply explained, Evangelical Press, 1985
- Looking for the Good Life: The Search for Fulfillment in the Light of Ecclesiastes, Presbyterian and Reformed, 1991 ISBN 978-0875522951
- Practical Christian – Welwyn Commentary Series: James, Evangelical Press, 1993 ISBN 978-0852342619
- Dawn of a Kingdom (1 Samuel) (Welwyn commentaries), Evangelical Press, 1988 ISBN 978-0852342480
- Triumph of the King (2 Samuel), Evangelical Press, 1993 ISBN 978-0852342725
- Preacher on the Run (Jonah) (Welwyn Commentary), Evangelical Press, 1993 ISBN 978-0852342312
- He Spoke in Parables, Evangelical Press, 1994 ISBN 978-0852343128
- You Are My Witnesses-Acts: (Welwyn commentaries), Evangelical Press, 1994 ISBN 978-0852343074
- The Lord's Supper is a Celebration of Grace: What the Bible Teaches about Communion, Evangelical Press, 1999 ISBN 978-0852344255
- The Lord Is His Name: Studies in the Prophecy of Amos, Evangelical Press, 2000 ISBN 978-0852342244
- The Guide to Ecclesiastes, Evangelical Press, 2002 ISBN 978-0852344859
- John: Volume 1 Chapters 1–12 (Evangelical Press Study Commentary), Evangelical Press, 2003 ISBN 978-0852344545
- John: Volume 2 Chapters 13–21 (Evangelical Press Study Commentary), Evangelical Press, 2002 ISBN 978-0852344798
- Heaven (Et Perspectives), Evangelical Press, 2006 ISBN 978-0950012926
- According to Promise (Numbers), Evangelical Press, 2010 ISBN 978-0852342954
- Christ's Covenant and Your Life (Presbyterian & Reformed Life), Crown & Covenant, 2013

=== Editor ===
- Willson, James Renwick, Political Danger Essays on the Mediatorial Kingship of Christ Over Nations and Their Political Institutions 1809–1838., Crown & Covenant, 2009 ISBN 978-1884527302
