= Iain M. Duguid =

British theologian and scholar (born 1960)

The Reverend Iain M. Duguid
- Born: October 15, 1960 (age 65); United Kingdom
- Occupations: Professor of Old Testament, author, pastor
- Title: Professor of Old Testament at Westminster Theological Seminary
- Spouse: Barbara

Academic background
- Education: University of Edinburgh (BSc, 1981); Westminster Theological Seminary (MDiv, 1989); University of Cambridge (PhD, 1992)
- Alma mater: University of Cambridge

Academic work
- Institutions: Westminster Theological Seminary (2014–present); Grove City College (2006–2014); Westminster Seminary California (1996–2006); Reformed Theological Seminary, Jackson (1995–1996)
- Notable works: Ezekiel (NIV Application Commentary); Song of Songs (Tyndale OT Commentary)

Iain M. Duguid is a British Reformed theologian, Old Testament scholar, and ordained teaching elder in the Associate Reformed Presbyterian Church. Since 2014 he has served as Professor of Old Testament at Westminster Theological Seminary, Philadelphia.

== Early life and education ==
Duguid received a BSc from the University of Edinburgh (1981), obtained his MDiv from Westminster Theological Seminary (1989), and earned a PhD in Old Testament from the University of Cambridge (1992), with a doctoral dissertation on Ezekiel subsequently published in the Supplements to Vetus Testamentum series.

== Career ==
Duguid began as an electrical engineer in Glasgow (1981–1983) and then served as a missionary electrical engineer at ELWA Christian Radio Station and Hospital in Monrovia, Liberia (1983–1985). He later embarked on a teaching career: at Reformed Theological Seminary, Jackson (1995–1996); Westminster Seminary California (1996–2006); Grove City College (2006–2014); and Westminster Theological Seminary (2014–present).

His research and publications span Ezekiel, Esther, Nehemiah, Song of Songs, Haggai, Zechariah, Malachi, and popular-level treatments of the patriarchs, Esther, and Daniel. Current research areas include Judges, the biblical theology of worship, and preaching Christ from diverse Old Testament genres. He has taken roles in Bible translation oversight, such as the Holman Christian Standard Bible, and contributed to various study Bibles.

In fall 2019, he became editor of The Quarterly, the adult Bible-study curriculum of the ARP Church, overseeing content covering the entire Bible over seven years.

== Pastoral ministry ==
Duguid is an ordained teaching elder in the ARP Church and has planted or pastored numerous congregations including Redeemer Presbyterian Church (EPCEW), Barton, Oxford, UK; Grace Presbyterian Church (PCA), Fallbrook, CA; Christ Presbyterian Church, Grove City, PA; and Christ Presbyterian Church, Glenside, PA.

== Selected publications ==
=== Editorial roles ===
- Old Testament Series Editor, Reformed Expository Commentary (P&R Publishing).
- Series Editor, The Gospel According to the Old Testament (P&R Publishing).
- Old Testament Editor, ESV Expository Commentary (Crossway).

=== Books ===
- Ezekiel and the Leaders of Israel, Supplements to Vetus Testamentum 56. Leiden: E.J. Brill, 1994.
- Ezekiel, NIV Application Commentary. Grand Rapids: Zondervan, 1999.
- Living in the Gap between Promise and Reality: The Gospel According to Abraham. Phillipsburg, NJ: P&R, 1999; 2nd ed., 2015.
- Hero of Heroes: Seeing Christ in the Beatitudes. Phillipsburg, NJ: P&R, 2001.
- Living in the Grip of Relentless Grace: The Gospel According to Isaac and Jacob. Phillipsburg, NJ: P&R, 2002; 2nd ed., 2015.
- Ruth, Esther, Reformed Expository Commentary. Phillipsburg, NJ: P&R, 2005.
- Numbers, Preach the Word Commentary. Wheaton, IL: Crossway, 2006.
- Daniel, Reformed Expository Commentary. Phillipsburg, NJ: P&R, 2008.
- Haggai, Zechariah, Malachi, EP Study Commentary. Darlington, UK: Evangelical Press, 2010.
- Is Jesus in the Old Testament? Phillipsburg, NJ: P&R, 2013.
- Living in the Light of Inextinguishable Hope: The Gospel According to Joseph. Phillipsburg, NJ: P&R, 2013.
- Song of Songs, Tyndale Old Testament Commentary. Downers Grove, IL: InterVarsity Press, 2015.
- Song of Songs, Reformed Expository Commentary. Phillipsburg, NJ: P&R, 2016.
- Zephaniah, Haggai, Malachi, Reformed Expository Commentary. Phillipsburg, NJ: P&R, 2018.
- The Whole Armor of God: How Christ’s Victory Strengthens Us for Spiritual Warfare. Wheaton, IL: Crossway, 2019.
- Jonah: Grace for Sinners and Saints. Greensboro, NC: New Growth Press, 2019.
- Ezra & Nehemiah: Rebuilding the Ruins. Greensboro, NC: New Growth Press, 2022.
- The Rebel Prophet: The Gospel in the Book of Jonah. Glenside, PA: St. Colmes’ Press, 2022.
- Me & God: A 21-Day Country Music Devotional. Glenside, PA: St. Colmes’ Press, 2022.
- "Ezekiel" in Isaiah–Malachi, ESV Expository Commentary. Wheaton, IL: Crossway, 2022.
- "Genesis" in Genesis–Numbers, ESV Expository Commentary. Wheaton, IL: Crossway, 2024.

He has also contributed scholarly articles, such as “Putting Priests in Their Place: Ezekiel’s Contribution to the History of the Old Testament Priesthood” (Ezekiel’s Hierarchical World, 2004), “Hagar the Egyptian. A Note on the Allure of Egypt in the Abraham Cycle” (WTJ 56, 1994), and “But Did They Live Happily Ever After? The Eschatology of the Book of Esther” (WTJ 68, 2006).

== Personal life ==
A native of Great Britain, Duguid is married to Barbara (often styled Barb) and has five to six children.
