= C. Herbert Oliver =

American pastor and civil rights activist (1925–2021)

The Reverend C. Herbert Oliver
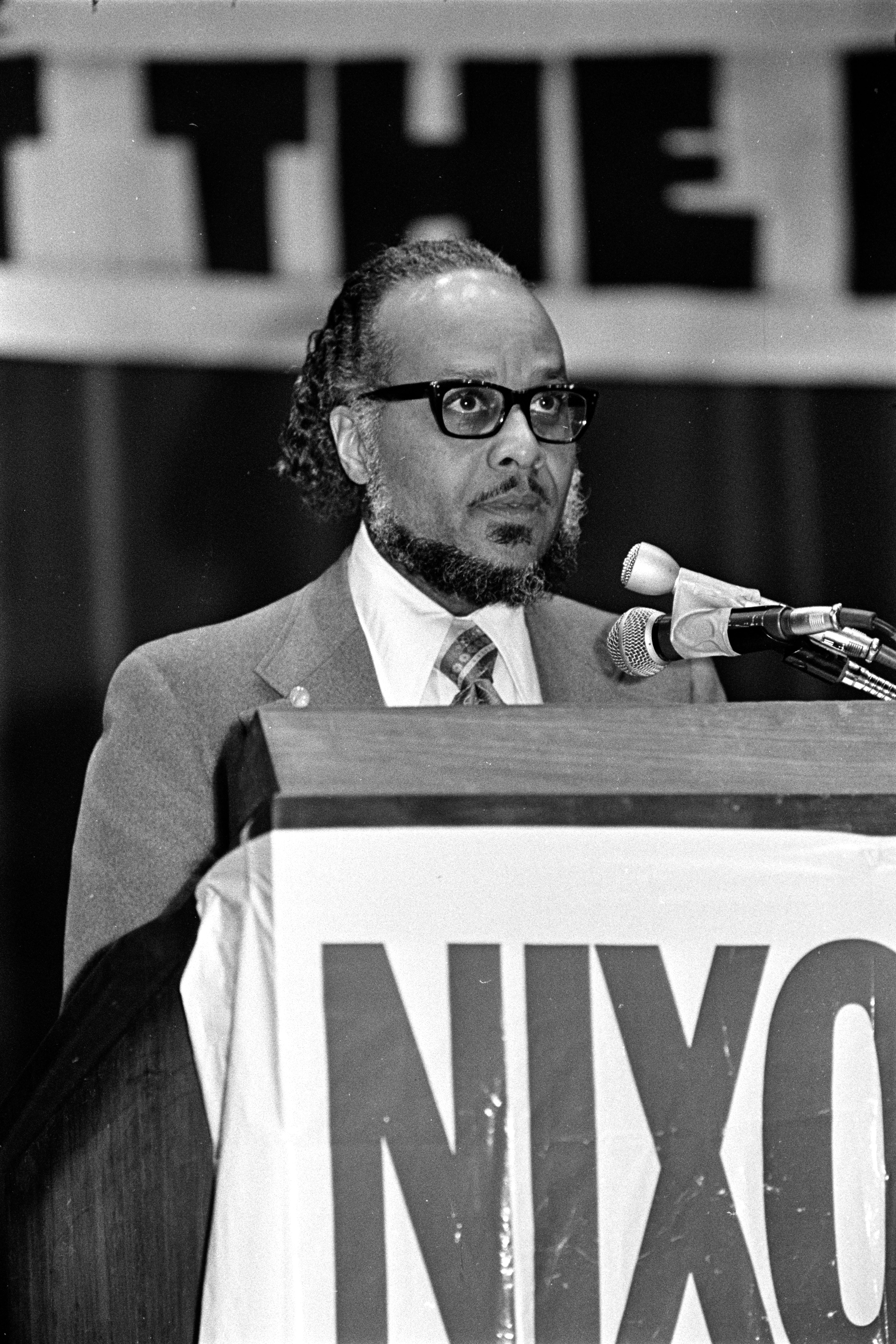
- Oliver speaks at an Impeach Nixon rally at Brooklyn College, April 17, 1974
- Born: Claude Herbert Oliver; February 28, 1925; Birmingham, Alabama
- Died: November 30, 2021 (aged 96)
- Education: Wheaton College
- Notable work: No Flesh Shall Glory: How the Bible Destroys the Foundations of Racism

Reverend Claude Herbert Oliver (February 28, 1925 – November 30, 2021) was an American pastor and civil rights activist who was the secretary of the Birmingham Inter-Citizens Committee from 1960 to 1965.

An ordained Orthodox Presbyterian Church minister, Oliver was a graduate of Wheaton College in Illinois and Westminster Theological Seminary.

After seminary Oliver spent about seven years as pastor of the Bethel Orthodox Presbyterian Church in northern Maine. In 1960, he returned to Birmingham and participated in the Birmingham campaign.

== Birmingham campaign ==
Five days after the 16th Street Baptist Church bombing, Oliver wrote a report on Birmingham in the form of a letter, speaking about the bombing and nineteen other incidents.
