= Stephen Dempster =

Canadian biblical scholar and academic

Stephen G. Dempster is a professor emeritus of religious studies at Crandall University. He previously held the Stuart E. Murray chair of religious studies, being succeeded by Keith Bodner.

== Early life and education ==
Dempster has a Bachelor of Arts Degree in Kinesiology from the University of Western Ontario, a Master of Arts in religion in Biblical Studies and Theology and a Master of Arts Degree in Old Testament Theology from Westminster Theological Seminary, and a Master of Arts in Near Eastern Studies (Classical Hebrew) and a Doctor of Philosophy in Classical Hebrew Language and Literature from the University of Toronto.

== Career ==
Dempster began a 37-year career at Crandall University in August 1984, first as assistant professor, then associate, and eventually professor. He held the role of Murray chair for 10 years, bringing in scholars to the university to lecture. He started the Crandall men's baseball team and acted as coach and manager for 10 years.

Dempster is the author of Dominion and Dynasty: A Biblical Theology of the Hebrew Bible and contributor to Biblical Theology: Retrospect and Prospect.

== Reviews ==
First Review of Dominion and Dynasty: A Biblical Theology of the Hebrew Bible

Second Review of Dominion and Dynasty: A Biblical Theology of the Hebrew Bible

== Personal life ==
Dempster and his wife Judy, who live in Ontario, Canada, have six children.
