= Westminster Theological Seminary =

Seminary in Glenside, Pennsylvania, US

Coordinates: 40.099°N 75.176°W

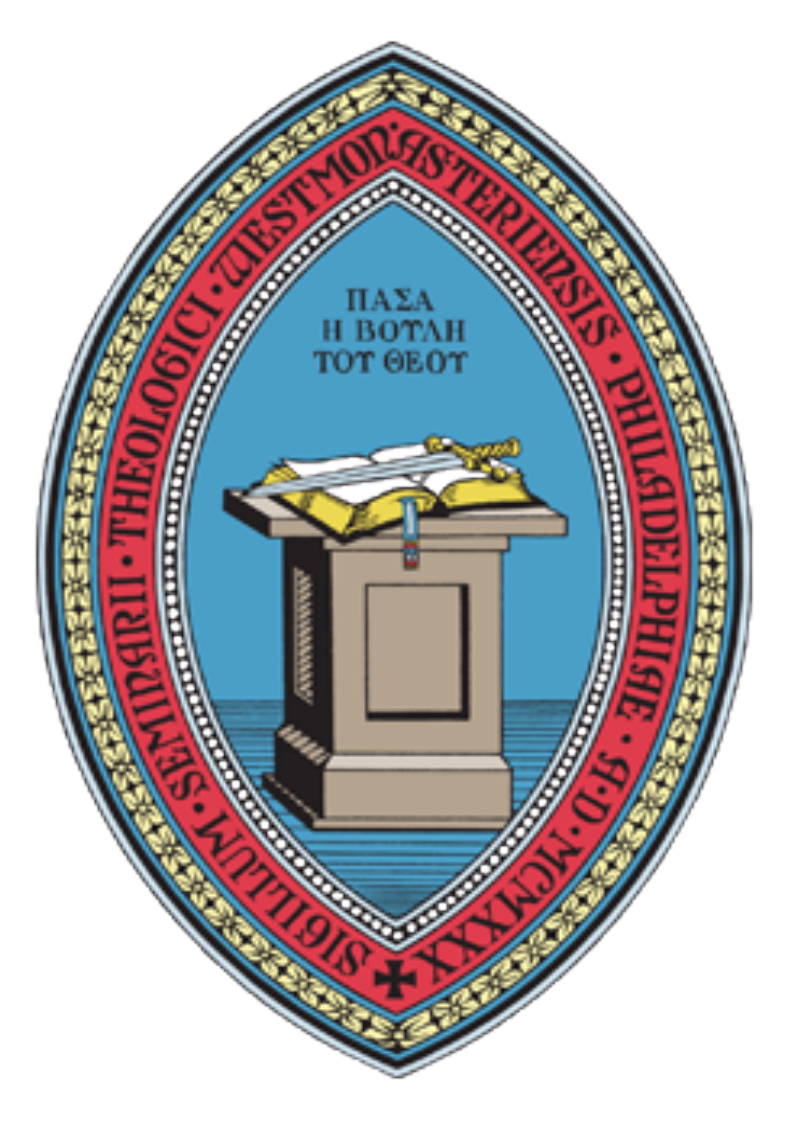
- Motto: ΠΑΣΑ Η ΒΟΥΛΗ ΤΟΥ ΘΕΟΥ PASA E BOULE TOU THEOU (Greek)
- Motto in English: The whole counsel of God
- Type: Private seminary
- Established: 1929; 97 years ago
- Religious affiliation: Reformed, Protestant
- President: David B. Garner
- Students: 1,354 (2025)
- Location: Glenside, Pennsylvania, United States
- Campus: Suburban
- Website: www.wts.edu

Westminster Theological Seminary (WTS) is a Protestant theological seminary in the Reformed theological tradition in Glenside, Pennsylvania. It was founded by members of the faculty of Princeton Theological Seminary in 1929 after Princeton chose to take a liberal direction during the Fundamentalist–Modernist controversy.

== History ==
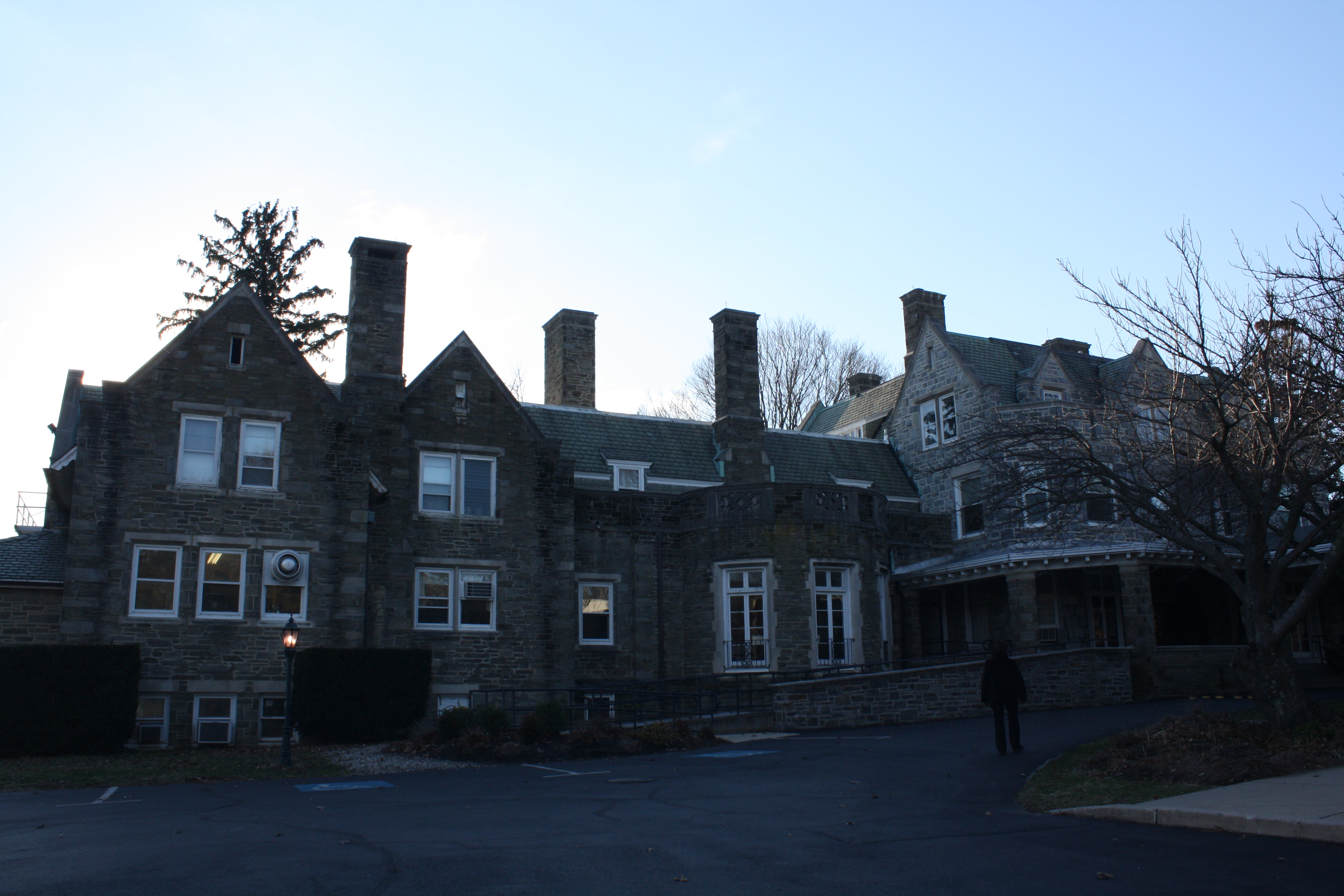
J. Gresham Machen Memorial Hall

Westminster Theological Seminary was formed in 1929, largely under the leadership and funding of J. Gresham Machen. Though independent, it has a close relationship with the Orthodox Presbyterian Church, which Machen helped found in 1936. The seminary was founded by members of the faculty of Princeton Theological Seminary, following a controversy over the liberal direction that Princeton was beginning to take. Westminster Theological Seminary considers itself to be the faithful continuation of Princeton's historic theological tradition. Many of the founders of Westminster, including Machen, John Murray, Oswald Allis, Robert Dick Wilson, and Cornelius Van Til, had been professors at Princeton prior to the controversy. The first president of the seminary was Edmund Clowney, who served from 1966 until 1984. He was followed by George C. Fuller and Samuel T. Logan. The current president is Peter Lillback, who also serves as a professor of historical theology.

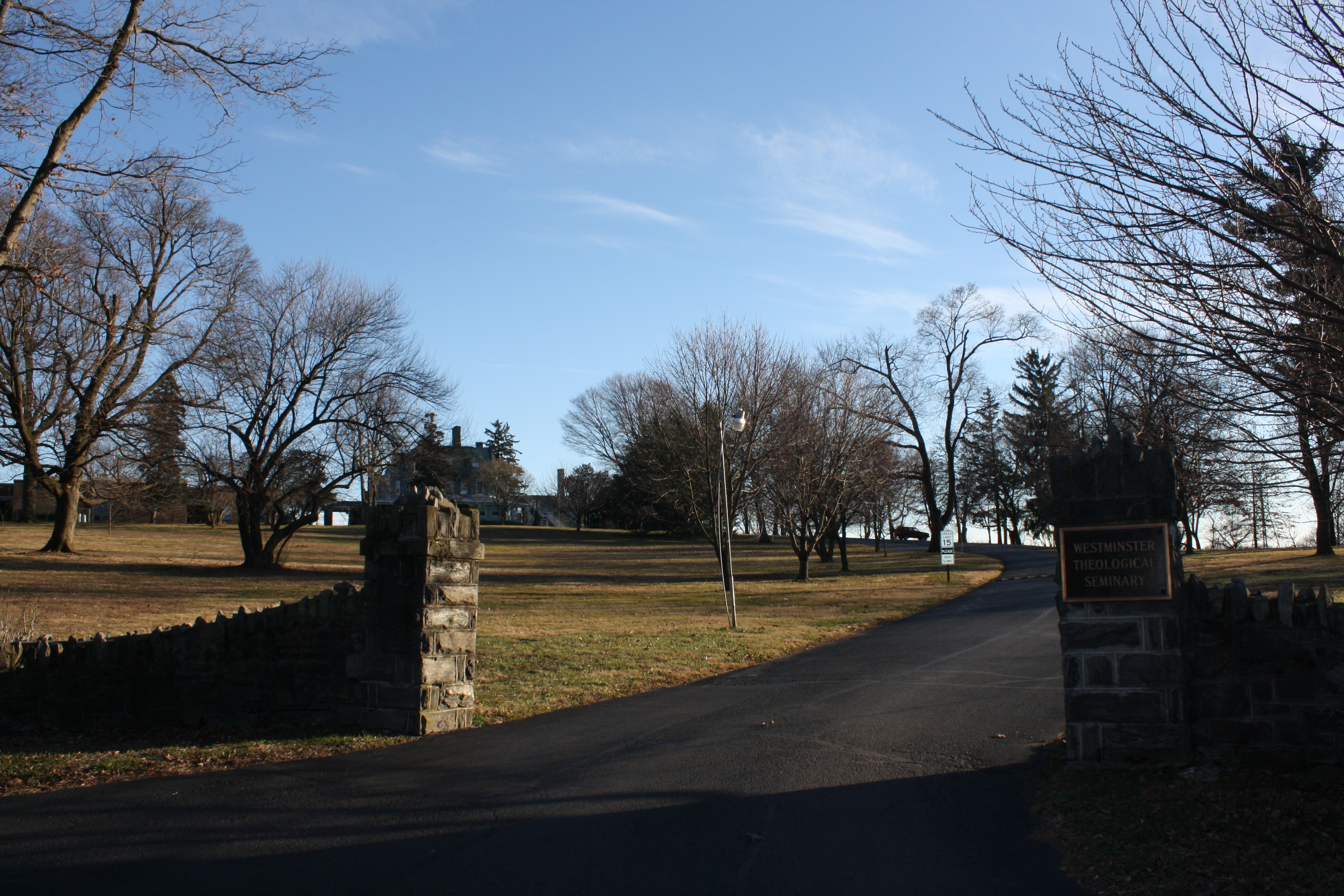
Campus in 2013

In 1982, the California branch of Westminster became an independent institution, the Westminster Seminary California, and in 2009 the Dallas branch was established as Redeemer Theological Seminary and since 2017 has been Reformed Theological Seminary's Dallas campus.

In 2011, Westminster signed a Memorandum of Understanding with International Reformed Evangelical Seminary in Jakarta, Indonesia. The two schools have been publishing the journals: International Journal of Reformed Theology and Life and Unio Cum Christo. Westminster also created an endowment for the Stephen Tong Chair of Reformed Theology the same year.

== Theological position ==
In Philadelphia on September 25, 1929, J. Gresham Machen declared the following in his inaugural address:

"We believe, first, that the Christian religion, as set forth in the Confession of Faith of the Presbyterian Church, is true; we believe, second, that the Christian religion welcomes and is capable of scholarly defense; and we believe, third, that the Christian religion should be proclaimed without fear or favor, and in clear opposition to whatever opposes it, whether from within or without the church, as the only way of salvation for lost mankind. On that platform, brethren, we stand. Pray that we may be enabled by God’s grace to stand firm. Pray that the students who go forth from Westminster Theological Seminary may know Christ as their own Savior and may proclaim to others the gospel of his love."

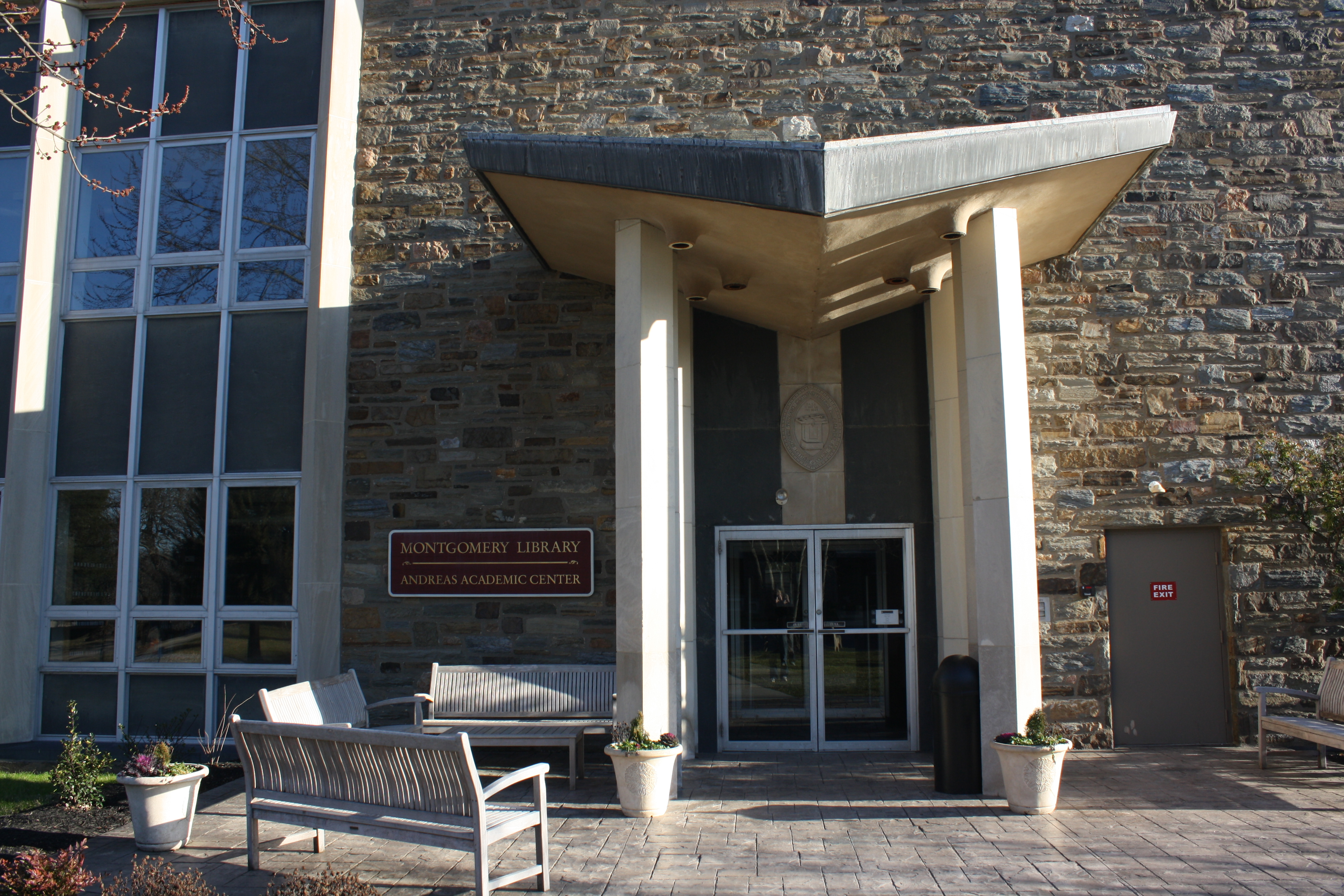
Entrance of Montgomery Library

The current board and faculty continue to hold to this original vision. All trustees and faculty members are required to affirm their agreement with the theological perspective presented in the Westminster Confession of Faith and the Larger and Shorter Catechisms, the core doctrinal statements of many Presbyterian denominations.

Westminster's strict adherence to the Westminster Standards and to Protestant theology in general has led to several dismissals of tenured faculty members since 1980. In 1981, theology professor Norman Shepherd was dismissed from Westminster due to his views on the doctrine of justification by faith alone. In 2008, Old Testament professor Peter Enns was dismissed from Westminster over controversial views expressed in his book Inspiration and Incarnation: Evangelicals and the Problem of the Old Testament, and in 2014 Old Testament professor Douglas Green was terminated from his position over his views on the relationship between the Old Testament and the New Testament.

In the early 1990s, Middle States Association of Colleges and Schools threatened Westminster's accreditation because of the seminary's refusal to give women membership on its board of trustees. The accrediting body backed down after the United States Department of Education took the seminary's side in the dispute.

== Accreditation ==
Westminster, under a charter from the Commonwealth of Pennsylvania granted in 1930 and as subsequently amended, has the power to grant the degrees of Master of Arts in Counseling, Master of Arts (Religion), Master of Divinity, Master of Theology, Doctor of Ministry, and Doctor of Philosophy.

Since 1954, Westminster has been accredited by the Middle States Commission on Higher Education or its predecessor. It is also accredited by the Association of Theological Schools in the United States and Canada.

== Academics ==
The seminary currently offers the following degrees:

- Master of Arts (MA)
- Master of Divinity (M.Div.)
- Master of Theology (Th.M.)
- Doctor of Ministry (D.Min.)
- Doctor of Philosophy (Ph.D.)

Westminster publishes the semi-annual Westminster Theological Journal.

== Legacy ==
According to Roger E. Olson, Westminster has had an influence on evangelicalism far beyond its size. Beyond Westminster's impact in the theological realm, the pioneering work of J. Alan Groves and his students has produced the codification of the Westminster Leningrad Codex, which underlies all modern Bible software.

== People ==
=== Leadership ===
- Edmund Clowney (1966–1984)
- George C. Fuller (1984–1991)
- Samuel T. Logan (1991–2005)
- Peter Lillback (2005–2026)
- David B. Garner (2026-present)

=== Notable faculty (past and present) ===
- Jay E. Adams
- Oswald Thompson Allis
- Gregory Beale
- Harvie M. Conn
- Ray Dillard
- Iain M. Duguid
- William Edgar
- Peter Enns
- Sinclair Ferguson
- John Frame
- Richard Gaffin
- Richard Gamble
- John Gerstner
- Robert Godfrey
- J. Alan Groves
- R. Laird Harris
- D. G. Hart
- Philip Edgecumbe Hughes
- Kent Hughes
- Tim Keller
- Rienk Kuiper
- Peter Lillback
- Tremper Longman
- John Gresham Machen
- Allan MacRae
- Jack Miller
- John Murray
- Manuel Ortiz
- David Powlison
- Vern Poythress
- O. Palmer Robertson
- Norman Shepherd
- Moisés Silva
- Ned Bernard Stonehouse
- Carl R. Trueman
- Chad Van Dixhoorn
- Cornelius Van Til
- Bruce Waltke
- Robert Dick Wilson
- Paul Woolley
- Edward Joseph Young

=== Notable alumni ===
- Greg Bahnsen
- Susan Wise Bauer
- Joel Beeke
- Alistair Begg
- Ralph Blair
- Robert M. Bowman, Jr.
- Anthony Bradley
- Eugene S. Callender
- Edward John Carnell
- Stafford Carson
- Edmund Clowney
- Harvie M. Conn
- Jack Cottrell
- Glenn Davies
- Stephen Dempster
- Mariano Di Gangi
- Ray Dillard
- Chad Van Dixhoorn
- Ian M. Duguid
- William Edgar
- Peter Enns
- John Frame
- Bob Fu
- Richard Gaffin
- John Gerstner
- Bruce L. Gordon
- Thomas David Gordon
- Mark Gornik
- J. Alan Groves
- Wayne Grudem
- Chulha Han
- Allan Harman
- Edward F. Hills
- Munther Isaac
- Paul King Jewett
- Karen H. Jobes
- James B. Jordan
- Gordon Keddie
- Timothy Keller
- John Euiwhan Kim
- Meredith Kline
- William L. Lane
- Peter Leithart
- Robert Letham
- Peter Lillback
- Andrew T. Lincoln
- Samuel T. Logan
- Tremper Longman
- Richard Lovelace
- George Marsden
- Taylor Marshall
- Carl McIntire
- J. Ramsey Michaels
- Bruce Miller
- C. John Miller
- Robert Morey
- Harold Ockenga
- Deok-Kyo Oh
- C. Herbert Oliver
- Manuel Ortiz
- Yun Sun Park
- Vern Poythress
- Richard L. Pratt, Jr.
- H. Evan Runner
- Philip Ryken
- Francis Schaeffer
- Moisés Silva
- James Skillen
- Bong-Ho Son
- Robert Sungenis
- Joni Eareckson Tada
- Paul David Tripp
- Willem A. VanGemeren
- Kevin Vanhoozer
- Marten Woudstra
- Young Hoon Lee

== See also ==
- Westminster Seminary California
- North China Theological Seminary (the "Westminster Seminary of China")
- List of Westminster Theological Seminary people
