= Julius Kim =

Julius Jason Kim is a Korean-American theologian and former president of The Gospel Coalition.

== Biography ==
Born in Los Angeles, Kim spent part of his childhood in South Korea before returning to California at the age of 12. He received a BA from Vanguard University, M.Div. from Westminster Seminary California, and Ph.D. from Trinity Evangelical Divinity School.

Kim taught at Trinity Evangelical Divinity School before moving to Westminster Seminary California in 2000, where he was the dean of students and professor of practical theology. Ordained in the Presbyterian Church in America, he is also an associate pastor at New Life Presbyterian Church in Escondido, California. Then in February 2020, Kim became president of The Gospel Coalition and will demit his responsibilities with Westminster in July 2020.

As of July 2025, he became the President’s Professor of Global Ministries and executive director of Korean Initiatives at Westminster Theological Seminary in Glenside, Pennsylvania.

== Works ==
- Kim, Julius (2003). The Religion of Reason and the Reason for Religion: John Tillotson and the Latitudinarian Defense of Christianity, 1630-1694. Trinity Evangelical Divinity School.
- Kim, Julius (2015). Preaching the Whole Counsel of God: Design and Deliver Gospel-Centered Sermons. Zondervan Academic. ISBN 978-0-310-51964-5.
