= Oswald Thompson Allis =

American theologian and academic (1880 – 1973)

O. T. Allis
- Born: September 9, 1880; Wallingford, Pennsylvania
- Died: January 12, 1973 (aged 92)
- Education: University of Pennsylvania; Princeton Theological Seminary; University of Berlin
- Occupations: Professor, writer

Oswald Thompson Allis (September 9, 1880 – January 12, 1973) was an American Presbyterian theologian and Bible scholar.

== Biography ==
Allis was born in 1880 and studied at the University of Pennsylvania and Princeton Theological Seminary. He received a master's degree from Princeton University and a doctorate from the University of Berlin. Later, Allis received an honorary Doctor of Divinity degree from Hampden Sydney College in 1927.

Allis taught in the Department of Semitic Philology at Princeton Theological Seminary (1910–1929). In 1929, Allis, J. Gresham Machen, Robert Dick Wilson and others founded Westminster Theological Seminary. Allis was independently wealthy and it was his property in Philadelphia which initially served as the home of the new seminary. He taught at Westminster for six years, and resigned in 1935 to devote himself to writing and study. Two of his more notable works are Prophecy and the Church (1945) and God Spake by Moses (1951). Allis was a conservative Christian theologian who believed in Mosaic authorship of the Pentateuch as well as single authorship of the book of Isaiah. He served as editor of the Princeton Theological Review from 1918 to 1929. In 1946 he lectured at Columbia Theological Seminary.

Allis also condemned dispensationalism as a modern error in his journal article, 'Modern Dispensationalism and the Doctrine of the Unity of Scripture,' published in the Evangelical Quarterly (1936): "[i]f Higher Criticism is the error of the Bible-disbeliever, “Dispensationalism “, as it is called, is the error of many a Bible-believer."

== Legacy ==
A festschrift in his honor was published in 1974 under the title The Law and the Prophets. Contributors included Cornelius Van Til, John Murray, R. Laird Harris, Walter Kaiser, Allan Harman, John Whitcomb, Meredith Kline and E. J. Young.

== Books ==
- The Five Books of Moses. The Presbyterian and Reformed Pub. Co. (1943)
- The Old Testament: Its Claims and Its Critics
- The Five Books of Moses: A reexamination of the modern theory that the Pentateuch is a late compilation from diverse and conflicting sources by authors and editors whose identity is completely unknown
- God Spake by Moses: An Exposition of the Pentateuch (1951)
- Prophecy and the Church: An examination of the claim of dispensationalists that the Christian church is a mystery parenthesis which interrupts the fulfilment ... the kingdom prophecies of the Old Testament (1945)
- The Unity of Isaiah: A Study in Prophecy (1977)
- Dr. Moffat's "New Translation " of the Old Testament
- The New English Bible, the New Testament of 1961: A comparative study
- Revision or New Translation?: The Revised Standard Version of 1946: A comparative study
