= Manuel Ortiz (pastor) =

American pastor and academic (1938–2017)

- Born: Manuel Ortiz; 1938; New York City, U.S.
- Died: February 8, 2017 (aged 78–79)
- Occupations: professor, pastor
- Title: Professor Emeritus of Ministry and Urban Missions at Westminster Theological Seminary
- Spouse: Blanca
- Children: 4 children

Academic background
- Education: Philadelphia College of the Bible, Wheaton College, Westminster Theological Seminary

Academic work
- Discipline: Practical theology
- Sub-discipline: Urban ministry
- Institutions: Westminster Theological Seminary
- Notable works: The Hispanic Challenge: Opportunities Confronting the Church; One New People: Models for Developing a Multiethnic Church

Manuel Ortiz (1938–2017) was an American pastor, professor, and writer, best known for teaching at Westminster Theological Seminary and for founding Spirit and Truth Fellowship, a multiethnic church in Philadelphia.

== Early life and education ==
Ortiz was born in New York City in 1938 to parents who had recently migrated from Puerto Rico. He grew up in Spanish Harlem. While Ortiz was raised in the Roman Catholic Church, he converted to Evangelical Christianity in young adulthood. After serving in the United States Marine Corps, Ortiz attended Philadelphia College of the Bible, graduating in 1972. He moved to Chicago and did graduate work at Wheaton College, and began to engage in his lifelong passion for urban ministry.

== Career ==
Ortiz was involved in the founding of several churches and schools in Chicago, Philadelphia, and Puerto Rico. In 1987 he returned to Philadelphia where he earned his Doctor of Ministry (D.Min.) degree at Westminster Theological Seminary. He remained at Westminster and taught there for almost 20 years, while at the same time planting and pastoring the urban and multiethnic congregation Spirit and Truth Fellowship, a ministry of the Christian Reformed Church in North America. He was the author of several articles and books. Following his retirement from Westminster in 2008, Ortiz taught and worked at Biblical Theological Seminary, where he retired in 2016.

== Death ==
Ortiz died from pulmonary fibrosis on February 8, 2017.

== Publications ==
- The Hispanic Challenge: Opportunities Confronting the Church (InterVarsity Press, 1994)
- One New People: Models for Developing a Multiethnic Church (Intervarsity Press, 2010)
- The Urban Face of Mission: Ministering the Gospel in a Diverse and Changing World (with Harvie Conn and Susan Baker) (P&R Publishing, 2002)
- Urban Ministry: The Kingdom, the City and the People of God (coauthored with Harvie Conn) (Intervarsity Press, 2010)
