= Paul David Tripp =

American pastor and author (born 1950)

- Born: November 12, 1950 (age 75); Toledo, Ohio, U.S.
- Education: Columbia Bible College (now Columbia International University); M.Div., Reformed Episcopal Seminary; D.Min., Westminster Theological Seminary
- Occupations: Pastor; author; conference speaker; biblical counselor
- Spouse: Luella Tripp
- Children: 4
- Website: www.paultripp.com

Paul David Tripp (born November 12, 1950) is an American pastor, author, biblical counselor, and international conference speaker. He is the founder and president of Paul Tripp Ministries, a nonprofit organization that produces gospel-centered resources for individuals, families, pastors, and churches.

== Early life and education ==
Tripp was born in Toledo, Ohio, on November 12, 1950. He studied at Columbia Bible College (now Columbia International University). He later earned a Master of Divinity (M.Div.) from Reformed Episcopal Seminary and a Doctor of Ministry (D.Min.) in biblical counseling from Westminster Theological Seminary.

== Career ==
Tripp began ministry as a pastor and church planter, also helping establish a Christian school. He later taught biblical counseling and pastoral ministry at Westminster Theological Seminary and served as a faculty member at the Christian Counseling & Educational Foundation (CCEF). He has also been a visiting lecturer at seminaries such as The Southern Baptist Theological Seminary.

In 2006 Tripp founded Paul Tripp Ministries, focusing on publishing books, developing video curriculum, and producing live and online conferences. His books are widely used in counseling contexts, small group studies, and seminary courses. Instruments in the Redeemer's Hands has become a core text in many biblical counseling programs.

He continues to travel internationally as a keynote speaker, addressing conferences on pastoral ministry, marriage, parenting, discipleship, and counseling.

== Theology and influence ==
Tripp emphasizes the centrality of the gospel in everyday life, counseling, and pastoral ministry. His works stress how grace transforms relationships, marriage, parenting, and church leadership. His book Dangerous Calling has been particularly influential in conversations on the pressures and failures of pastoral ministry.

== Selected bibliography ==
- Tripp, Paul David (1997). Age of Opportunity: A Biblical Guide to Parenting Teens (2nd ed. 2001 ed.). P&R Publishing. ISBN 978-0-87552-605-8.
- Tripp, Paul David (2002). Instruments in the Redeemer's Hands: People in Need of Change Helping People in Need of Change. P&R Publishing. ISBN 978-0-87552-607-2.
- Tripp, Paul David (2000). War of Words: Getting to the Heart of Your Communication Struggles. P&R Publishing. ISBN 978-0-87552-604-1.
- Tripp, Paul David (2004). Lost in the Middle: Midlife and the Grace of God. Shepherd Press. ISBN 978-0-97230-468-9.
- Tripp, Paul David (2010). What Did You Expect? Redeeming the Realities of Marriage. Crossway. ISBN 978-1-4335-1176-9.
- Tripp, Paul David (2011). Forever: Why You Can't Live Without It. Crossway. ISBN 978-1-4335-2782-1.
- Tripp, Paul David (2012). Dangerous Calling: Confronting the Unique Challenges of Pastoral Ministry. Crossway. ISBN 978-1-4335-3582-6.
- Tripp, Paul David (2013). Sex and Money: Pleasures That Leave You Empty and Grace That Satisfies. Crossway. ISBN 978-1-4335-5665-4.
- Tripp, Paul David (2014). New Morning Mercies: A Daily Gospel Devotional. Crossway. ISBN 978-1-4335-4138-4.
- Tripp, Paul David (2015). Awe: Why It Matters for Everything We Think, Say and Do. Crossway. ISBN 978-1-4335-4258-9.
- Tripp, Paul David (2018). Suffering: Gospel Hope When Life Doesn't Make Sense. Crossway. ISBN 978-1-4335-5677-7.
- Tripp, Paul David (2018). Sex in a Broken World: How Christ Redeems What Sin Distorts. Crossway. ISBN 978-1-4335-5675-3.
- Tripp, Paul David (2018). Redeeming Money: How God Reveals and Reorients Our Hearts. Crossway. ISBN 978-1-4335-5679-1.
- Tripp, Paul David (2021). Do You Believe?: 12 Historic Doctrines to Change Your Everyday Life. Crossway. ISBN 978-1-4335-7016-2.
- Tripp, Paul David (2024). New Morning Mercies for Teens. Crossway. ISBN 978-1-4335-9236-2.
