= Bong-Ho Son =

South Korean theologist (born 1938)

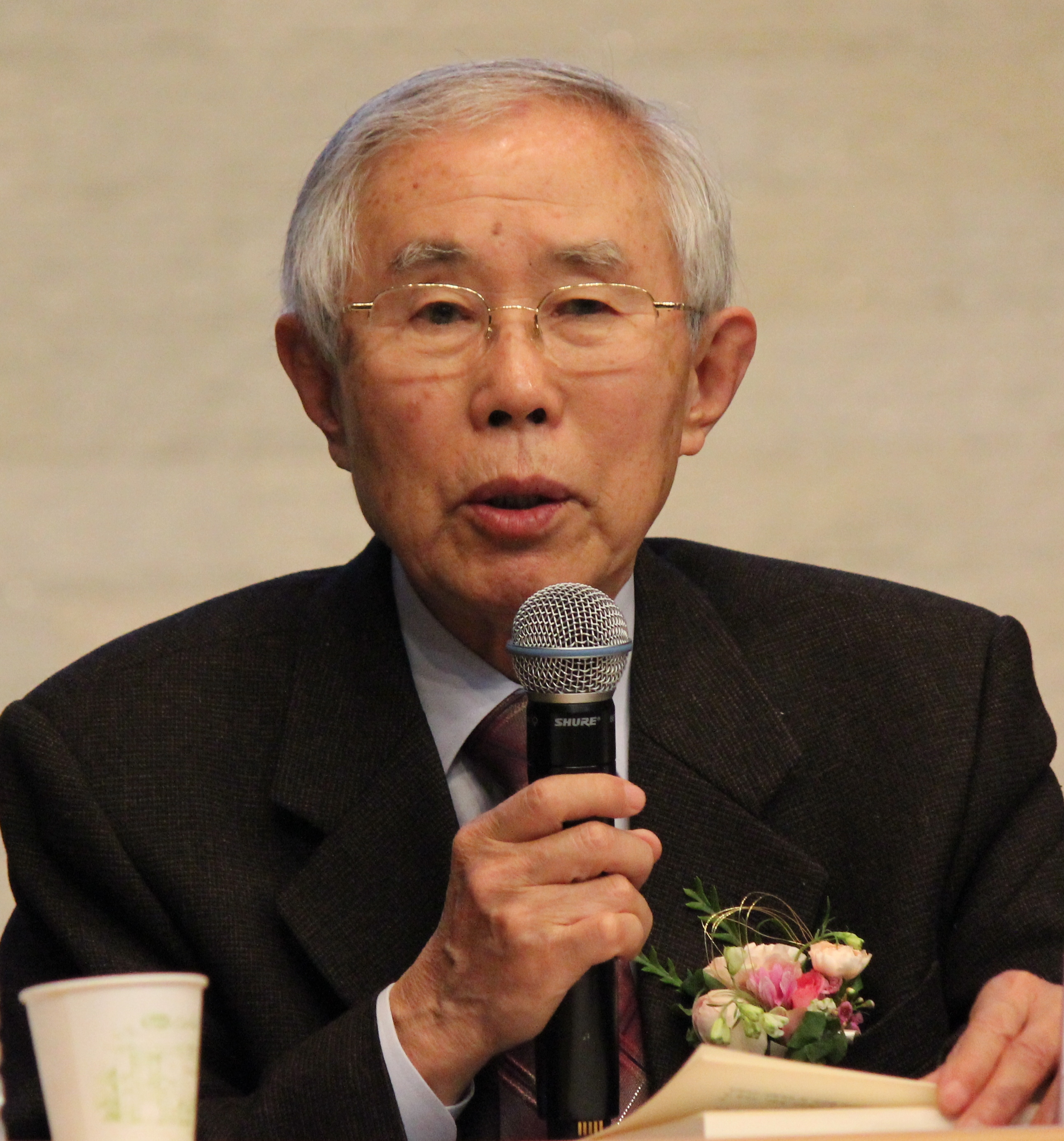
Son (date unknown)

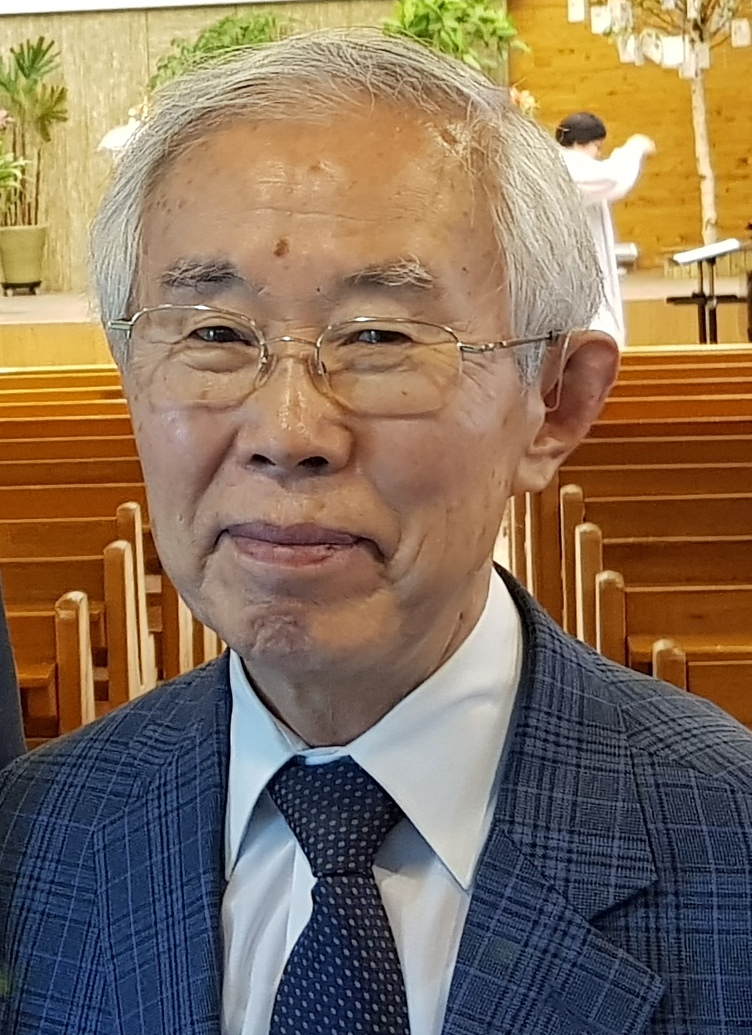
Son in Suwon, South Korea, 2018

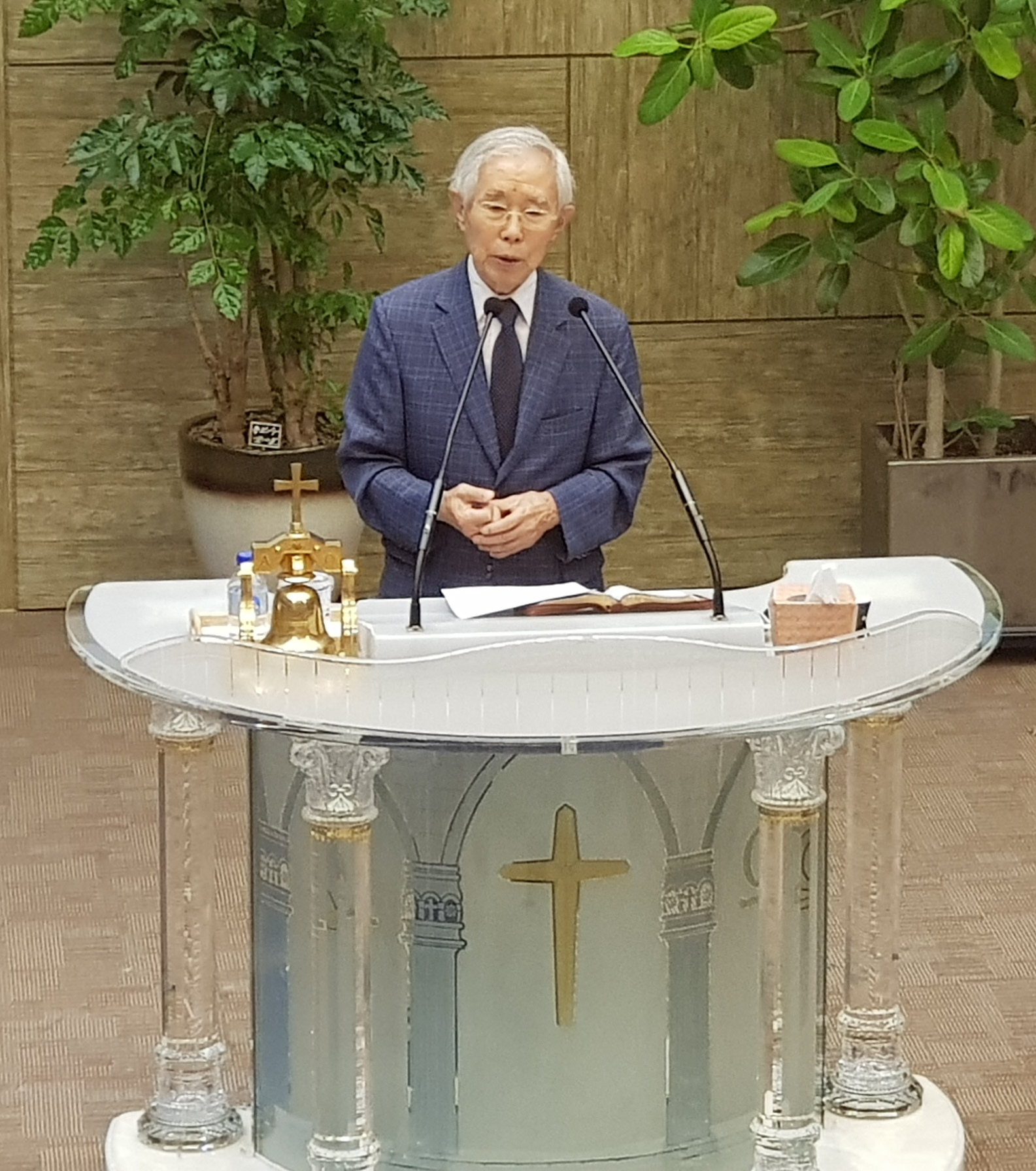
Son at Samyung Church in Suwon, South Korea, 2018

Bong-Ho Son (孫鳳鎬; born 1938) is a South Korean Christian ethics scholar and social activist. Son was born in Korea, and graduated from Gyeongju High School and Seoul National University. He then studied theology at Westminster Theological Seminary in the United States, and received his PhD from Vrije Universiteit Amsterdam in the Netherlands. He has taught at the Hankuk University of Foreign Studies and Seoul National University, and has served as president of Hansung University and of Dongduk Women's University. In 2011, he established the Sharing National Movement Headquarters, where he is in charge of representation. He is working in the field of the Christian Ethics Movement of Korea.
