= Alistair Begg =

Scottish-born pastor

Pastor Alistair Begg
- Born: 22 May 1952 (age 74); Glasgow, Scotland
- Education: London School of Theology; Nottingham Trent University; Westminster Theological Seminary
- Occupations: Pastor, author, radio teacher
- Years active: 1975–present
- Spouse: Susan Begg
- Children: 3
- Honors: Honorary doctorates: Westminster Theological Seminary (2009); Cedarville University; Grove City College (2015)
- Website: truthforlife.org/about/about-alistair-begg

Alistair Begg (born May 22, 1952) is a retired Scottish pastor who served a significant portion of his ministry in America. He is the former senior pastor of Parkside Church in Cleveland, Ohio. He leads ‘’Truth for Life’’, a preaching and teaching ministry that broadcasts his sermons daily to more than 1,800 radio stations in North America. Begg is the author and editor of numerous books.

== Early life and education ==
Begg was born in Glasgow, Scotland, on May 22, 1952. With regard to career, Begg first considered law, but “sensed a call to pastoral ministry” which redirected his path of study.

He graduated from the London School of Theology (LST), in Northwood, London in 1975.

== Career ==
Alistair Begg graduated from the London School of Theology. He worked as a pastor for eight years in Scotland, both at Charlotte Chapel in Edinburgh and Hamilton Baptist Church, near Glasgow. In 1983, he became senior pastor at Parkside Church in suburban Cleveland, Ohio, and worked there until retiring in 2025.

=== Radio ministry ===
Begg's content is the mainstay of, and he leads ‘’Truth for Life’’, a preaching and teaching ministry broadcasting his sermons daily to more than 1,800 radio stations in North America. He has published several devotional books based on his radio talks.

=== Influences ===
Among Begg's stated influences—first, as stated by Peter A. Lillback, president of Westminster Theological Seminary, were Eric J. Alexander, Sinclair B. Ferguson, Martyn Lloyd-Jones, Richard C. Lucas, Alex Motyer, and Derek J. Prime. In addition to these, Jim Elliot, Eric Liddell, Charles Spurgeon, John Stott, and Hudson Taylor have been mentioned.

=== Theological views ===
Begg believes in the inerrancy and supremacy of Scripture, and in the saving power of Christ alone. He has said that the core belief of Parkside Church is "that Jesus Christ, the Son of God, has died as an atoning sacrifice for our sins, and that to know Him is to know life, both now and forever... Jesus Christ is the only Savior, because Jesus is the only one who is qualified to save."

=== Controversy ===
In January 2024, Begg received criticism for advising a grandmother to attend her grandson's wedding to a transgender person. Critics included Owen Strachan, provost of Grace Bible Theological Seminary in Conway, Arkansas, and Steve Jordahl of the American Family Association, the latter of which removed Begg's Truth for Life broadcasts from its American Family Radio network.

== Awards and recognition ==
Begg has received several honorary degrees, including Doctor of Divinity degrees from Westminster Theological Seminary (May 28, 2009) and from Grove City College in Grove City, Pennsylvania (May 16, 2015).

== Personal life ==
Begg left his native Scotland, after three decades, in 1983 when he took his position at Parkside, although he has retained a distinctive Scottish accent through his years of ministry in the United States.

Begg married his wife Susan, an American, in 1975. They have three grown children, and several grandchildren.

== Bibliography ==
=== Works Edited ===
- C.S.B. [version] Spurgeon Study Bible. B&H Publishing Group, 2023.

=== Works Authored ===
- What Angels Wish They Knew: The Basics of True Christianity. Moody Publishers, 1998.
- Preaching for God's Glory. Crossway, 1999.
- Pathway to Freedom: How God's Laws Guide Our Lives. Crossway Books, 2000.
- The Hand of God: Finding His Care in All Circumstances. Moody Publishers, 2001.
- (With Derek Prime:) On Being a Pastor: Understanding Our Calling and Work. Moody Publishers, 2004.
- Made for His Pleasure: Ten Benchmarks of a Vital Faith. Moody Publishers, 2005.
- Christmas Playlist: Four Songs That Bring You to the Heart of Christmas. The Good Book Company, 2016.
- Parenting God's Way. 10Publishing, 2017.
- (With Sinclair Ferguson:) Name Above All Names. Crossway Books, 2018.
- Pray Big. The Good Book Company, 2019.
- Brave by Faith. The Good Book Company, 2021.
- Truth for Life: 365 Daily Devotions, Volume 1. The Good Book Company, 2021.
- Truth for Life: 365 Daily Devotions, Volume 2. The Good Book Company, 2022.
- The Christian Manifesto: Jesus’ Life-Changing Words from the Sermon on the Plain. The Good Book Company, 2023.
- Let Earth Receive Her King. The Good Book Company, 2024.
- (With Charles H. Spurgeon:) Morning and Evening. Forthcoming.
