= Harvie M. Conn =

Canadian-American missionary and theologian (1933-1999)

- Born: April 7, 1933; Regina, Saskatchewan, Canada
- Died: August 28, 1999 (aged 66)
- Occupation: Professor

Harvie Maitland Conn (April 7, 1933 – August 28, 1999) was a Canadian-American Presbyterian minister, missionary, and professor of missions at Westminster Theological Seminary. He was a leading figure in urban missiology, integrating cultural analysis and Reformed theology to advance urban evangelism.

== Early life and education ==
Harvie Conn was born on April 7, 1933 in Regina, Saskatchewan to Irish immigrant parents. His family later moved to California, where Conn was converted to Christianity as a teenager at Covenant Presbyterian Church in Berkeley. Despite early skepticism from church teachers about his future, Conn pursued higher education, attending Calvin College in Michigan in the early 1950s, where he was deeply influenced by the Dutch Reformed tradition.

After completing his B.A. at Calvin College, Conn earned his Bachelor of Divinity (B.D., 1957) and Master of Theology (Th.M., 1958) from Westminster Theological Seminary in Philadelphia. He also pursued doctoral studies in philosophy for three years at Temple University, although he did not complete the degree. Later, he received an honorary Doctor of Letters (Litt.D.) from Geneva College in 1976.

== Career and ministry ==
Conn was ordained as a minister in the Orthodox Presbyterian Church (OPC) in 1957. In 1960, he and his family were sent to South Korea as missionaries under the auspices of the OPC. Over 12 years, Conn engaged in theological education at Chongshin Theological Seminary in Seoul, evangelistic outreach, and broadcasting. He held Bible studies among marginalized groups, including brothel workers and impoverished street children—experiences that profoundly shaped his missiological outlook.

Conn’s engagement with the poor led to his conviction that evangelism must also address social justice. His experiences in Korea inspired his 1982 book Evangelism: Doing Justice and Preaching Grace, in which he emphasized that sinners can also be the sinned against.

Returning to the U.S. in 1972, Conn joined the faculty of Westminster Theological Seminary. Initially teaching apologetics, he shifted his focus to missions and became the seminary's first professor of missions. Conn played a key role in developing Westminster’s Urban Missions Program, which included a Doctor of Ministry (D.Min.) in urban mission, a Master of Arts in Missiology (M.A.Miss.), and a Master of Arts in Religion (M.A.R.) with an urban focus. He also edited the journal Urban Mission from 1983–1999, which disseminated practical and theological reflections on ministry in the city.

Conn’s vision for urban theology was shaped by a conviction that the city is central to God’s redemptive purposes. He famously argued, “We no longer live in a global village, but a global city.” He called for theological education that was not just about the city, but in the city — blending academic study with lived experience.

== Personal life and death ==
Conn married Dorothy Diedrich in 1956, and together they had five children. He died on August 28, 1999 in Wyndmoor, Pennsylvania after a long battle with cancer.

== Legacy ==
A Festschrift was published in his honor: The Urban Face of Mission: Ministering the Gospel in a Diverse and Changing World, which included contributions from scholars such as William Dyrness, Samuel Escobar, Paul Hiebert, and Charles H. Kraft.

D. G. Hart argues that Tim Keller's views about "word and deed ministries" are influenced by Conn's "theory and practice of urban missions and ministry." Tim Keller also cites Conn as saying that Jonah 2:9 is the central verse in the whole Bible: 'Salvation is of the LORD'.

== Select publications ==
- Contemporary World Theology: A Layman's Guidebook. (Presbyterian and Reformed Publishing, 1974).
- Bible Studies on World Evangelization and the Simple Lifestyle. (Presbyterian and Reformed Publishing, 1981).
- Evangelism: Doing Justice and Preaching Grace (P&R Publishing, 1982).
- Reaching the Unreached: The Old-New Challenge. (Presbyterian and Reformed Publishing, 1984).
- Eternal Word and Changing Worlds: Theology, Anthropology, and Mission in Trialogue. (P&R Publishing, 1984).
- A Clarified Vision for Urban Mission: Dispelling the Urban Stereotypes. (Ministry Resources Library, 1987).
- The American City and the Evangelical Church: A Historical Overview. (Baker Books, 1994).
- Planting and Growing Urban Churches: From Dream to Reality. (Baker Books, 1997).
- Urban Ministry: The Kingdom, the City, and the People of God. (InterVarsity Press, 2001). (co-authored with Manuel Ortiz)
