= R. Kent Hughes =

American pastor and author

Richard Kent Hughes (born March 1, 1942) is an American Christian minister who served as the senior pastor of College Church in Wheaton, Illinois, until 2006.

== Career ==
Hughes is the author of numerous books, including Disciplines of a Godly Man. He is also editor and contributor for the projected 50-volume Preaching the Word series, including Mark: Jesus, Servant and Savior, which received the ECPA Gold Medallion Book Award for best commentary in 1990.

Hughes served as senior pastor of College Church for 27 years and retired at the end of 2006. He moved to Wheaton from California, where he pastored two churches. He holds a BA from Whittier College, an M.Div. from Talbot School of Theology, a D.Min. from Trinity Evangelical Divinity School and a DD from Biola University.

In 2008, a Festschrift was published in his honor. Preach the Word: Essays on Expository Preaching In Honor of R. Kent Hughes (ISBN 1-58134-926-2) included contributions by David Jackman, D. A. Carson, Wayne Grudem, John F. MacArthur, Bruce Winter, J. I. Packer, Phillip Jensen, Philip Graham Ryken, and Peter Jensen. In early 2019, he retired from teaching at Westminster Theological Seminary in Philadelphia, Pennsylvania.

== Personal life ==
He lives in Pennsylvania state with his wife, Barbara. He is the father of 4, grandfather of 26 and great-grandfather of 14.

== Teaching and professional history ==
- Westminster Theological Seminary, 2015–2019
- Senior pastor of College Church in Wheaton, IL, 1979–2006
- Church planter in Southern California, 1974–1979
- Adjunct professor at Talbot School of Theology, 1974–1979
- Served variously as high school pastor, college pastor and associate pastor, 1963–1974
- Youth for Christ Club director, 1960–1961

== Books ==
- Disciplines of a Godly Family (with Barbara Hughes) (ISBN 1-58134532-1)
- Disciplines of a Godly Man (ISBN 0-89107817-7)
- Disciplines of Grace (ISBN 0-89107-731-6)
- Liberating Ministry from the Success Syndrome (ISBN 0-84232849-1)
- Set Apart: Calling a Worldly Church to a Godly Life (ISBN 1-58134491-0)
- The Christian Wedding Planner (with Ruth Muzzy) (ISBN 0-84230456-8)
- The Coming Evangelical Crisis: Current Challenges to the Authority of Scripture and the Gospel (ISBN 0-80247747-X)
- Worship by the Book (with Rev. Mark Ashton, Timothy J. Keller and D.A. Carson) (ISBN 0-31021625-7)
- Mastering the Pastoral Role (ISBN 0-88070439-X)

=== Preaching the Word Series ===
- Genesis: Beginning and Blessing (ISBN 1-58134629-8)
- Exodus: Saved for God’s Glory (with Philip Graham Ryken) (ISBN 1-58134489-9)
- Numbers: God’s Presence in the Wilderness (with Iain M. Duguid) (ISBN 1-58134363-9)
- Isaiah: God Saves Sinners (ISBN 1-58134727-8)
- Jeremiah and Lamentations: From Sorrow to Hope (with Philip Graham Ryken) (ISBN 1-58134167-9)
- Daniel: The Triumph of God’s Kingdom (with Rodney Stortz) (ISBN 1-58134550-X)
- The Sermon on the Mount: The Message of the Kingdom (ISBN 158134063X)
- Abba Father: The Lord's Pattern for Prayer (ISBN 0891073779)
- Mark: Jesus, Servant and Savior (ISBN 0891075224)
- Luke: That you May Know the Truth (ISBN 1581340281)
- John: That You May Believe (ISBN 1581341016)
- Acts: The Church Afire (ISBN 0891078738)
- Romans: Righteousness from Heaven (ISBN 0891075240)
- 2 Corinthians: Power in Weakness (ISBN 1581347634)
- Ephesians: The Mystery of the Body of Christ (ISBN 089107581X)
- Philippians: The Fellowship of the Gospel (ISBN 1581349548)
- Colossians and Philemon: The Supremacy of Christ (ISBN 0891074880)
- 1 and 2 Timothy and Titus: To Guard the Deposit (ISBN 158134175X)
- Hebrews: An Anchor for the Soul (ISBN 0891077235)
- James: Faith That Works (ISBN 0891076271)
