= George C. Fuller =

American theologian and academic (1932–2021)

George Cain Fuller (1932 – May 5, 2021) was an American theologian and academic who was Professor of Practical Theology, later Emeritus, and a president of the Westminster Theological Seminary. He served as president from 1984 to 1991. Fuller was a pastor in the Presbyterian Church in America (PCA).

Fuller studied at Haverford College, Princeton Theological Seminary, Westminster Theological Seminary, and Babson College. He taught at Northwestern College and Reformed Theological Seminary prior to coming to WTS. He died on May 5, 2021.

Academic offices
Preceded by Edmund Clowney	President of Westminster Theological Seminary; 1984-1991	Succeeded by Samuel T. Logan
