= Adoption (theology) =

Christian doctrine

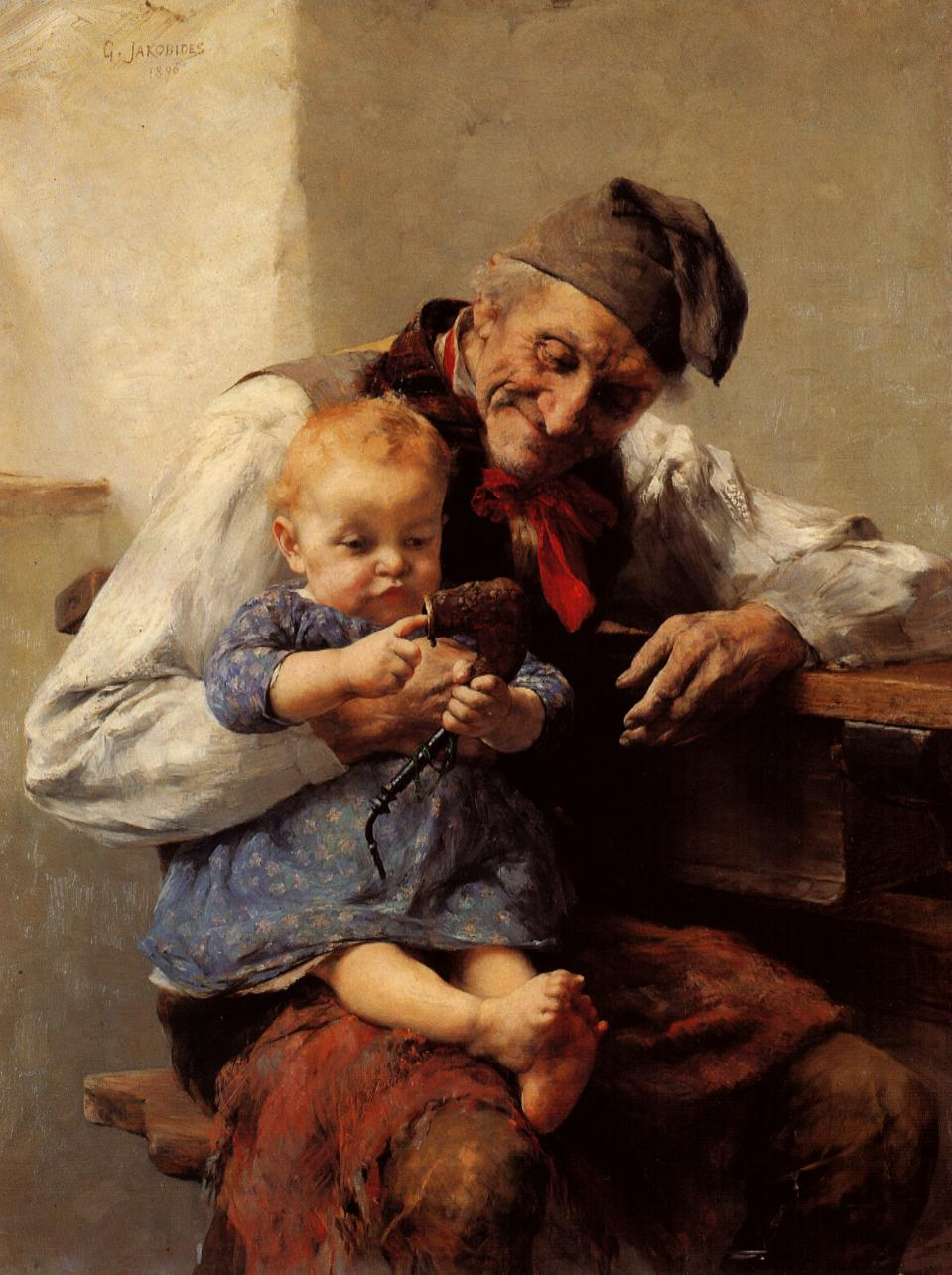
The Favorite, by Georgios Iakovidis, 1890.

Adoption, in Christian theology, is the reception of a believer into the family of God. In the Reformed ordo salutis ("order of salvation"), adoption is usually regarded as a step immediately subsequent to justification. As a theological word, adoption has similar connotations to the act of parents who legally take responsibility for a child who was not originally born to them. There are three references in the New Testament to God "adopting" ('υιοθεσια, uiothesia) Christians as his own children (Galatians 4:5, Romans 8:15 and Ephesians 1:5) and one reference to God adopting the "people of Israel" (Romans 9:4). Adoption as a theological term introduces a relational dimension to the consequences of salvation.

Adoption as a theological concept is also another consequence of the 'legal' act of justification, alongside redemption and reconciliation. The Old Testament precedent for this term comes from the story of Mephibosheth, who despite not being part of Davidic family was included in the Royal inheritance (2 Samuel 9:7-13). Adoption is an important feature of Reformation theology as demonstrated by article 12 of the Westminster Confession of Faith:

All those that are justified, God vouchsafes, in and for His only Son Jesus Christ, to make partakers of the grace of adoption, by which they are taken into the number, and enjoy the liberties and privileges of the children of God.

== See also ==
- Sonship theology
