= Edmund Clowney =

American theologian and academic (1917 – 2005)

- Born: Edmund Prosper Clowney; July 30, 1917; Philadelphia, Pennsylvania, U.S.
- Died: March 20, 2005 (aged 87)
- Title: President of Westminster Theological Seminary
- Spouse: Jean Granger (nee Wright)
- Children: five children

Academic background
- Education: Wheaton College; Westminster Theological Seminary; Yale Divinity School
- Alma mater: Wheaton College (DD)

Academic work
- Discipline: Biblical theology
- Institutions: Westminster Theological Seminary; Trinity Presbyterian Church; Westminster Seminary California
- Notable works: Preaching and Biblical Theology

Edmund Prosper Clowney (/ˈklaʊni/; July 30, 1917 – March 20, 2005) was an American theologian, educator, and pastor.

== Early life and education ==
Born in Philadelphia, Pennsylvania, he earned a Bachelor of Arts from Wheaton College in 1939, a Bachelor of Theology from Westminster Theological Seminary in 1942, a Master of Sacred Theology from Yale Divinity School in 1944, and a Doctor of Divinity from Wheaton College in 1966.

== Ministry ==
Clowney was ordained in the Orthodox Presbyterian Church, and served as pastor for churches in Connecticut, Illinois, and New Jersey from 1942 to 1946. Westminster Theological Seminary invited him to become an assistant professor of practical theology in 1952. In 1966 he became the first president of that seminary, and remained so until 1984, when he became the theologian-in-residence of Trinity Presbyterian Church (part of the Presbyterian Church in America) in Charlottesville, Virginia. In 1990, he moved to Escondido, California where he was adjunct professor at Westminster Seminary California. In 2001 he began a full-time position as associate pastor at Christ the King Presbyterian Church in Houston, Texas. After two years in Texas, Clowney returned to Trinity Presbyterian Church as part-time theologian-in-residence, a position he held until his death in 2005.

Tim Keller said that Clowney and J. Alec Motyer were "the fathers of my preaching ministry".

In 1990 a Festschrift was published in his honor. Practical Theology and the Ministry of the Church, 1952-1984: Essays in Honor of Edmund P. Clowney included contributions from Jay E. Adams, William Edgar, Roger Nicole, J. I. Packer, Robert G. Rayburn, and Geoff Thomas.

Clowney married Jean Granger Wright (1920–2008) on August 30, 1942. They had five children.

== Publications ==
Clowney was also a prolific writer. Books that he has authored include:

- Preaching and Biblical Theology (ISBN 0-87552-145-2)
- Called to the Ministry (ISBN 0-87552-144-4)
- Christian Meditation (ISBN 1-57383-227-8)
- Doctrine of the Church
- The Message of I Peter: The Way of the Cross (The Bible Speaks Series, ISBN 0-8308-1227-X)
- The Unfolding Mystery: Discovering Christ in the Old Testament (ISBN 0-87552-174-6)
- Preaching Christ in All of Scripture (ISBN 1-58134-452-X)
- The Church (Contours of Christian Theology, ISBN 0-8308-1534-1)
- How Jesus Transforms the Ten Commandments (ISBN 978-1-59638-036-3)

In addition, he authored many articles, lectures and sermons, including the anonymous humor column "Eutychus and His Pin" (later renamed "Eutychus and His Kin") for the magazine Christianity Today from 1955-60, and Bible studies for the daily devotional Tabletalk.

== See also ==
- List of Christian theologians

Academic offices
New office	President of Westminster Theological Seminary; 1966-1984	Succeeded by George C. Fuller
