= Samuel T. Logan =

American historian and Presbyterian minister (born 1943)

The Reverend Samuel T. Logan
- Born: Samuel Talbot Logan Jr. October 26, 1943 (age 82); Vicksburg, Mississippi, US
- Spouse: Susan Luthman Logan

Ecclesiastical career
- Religion: Christianity (Presbyterian)
- Church: Orthodox Presbyterian Church

Academic background
- Education: Princeton University; Westminster Theological Seminary; Emory University
- Thesis: Hermeneutics and American Literature (1972)
- Doctoral advisor: David Hesla

Academic work
- Discipline: History
- Sub-discipline: Ecclesiastical history
- Institutions: Barrington College; Westminster Theological Seminary; Biblical Theological Seminary

Samuel Talbot Logan Jr. (born October 26, 1943) is an American ecclesiastical historian and Presbyterian minister. He is professor of Church history at Biblical Theological Seminary and former president of Westminster Theological Seminary. He served as president from 1991 to 2005. He is an ordained minister in the Orthodox Presbyterian Church. Logan's tenure was abruptly terminated in 2005 by the seminary's board of trustees due to their perception that he was too inclusive of liberal scholarship.

== Works ==
=== Thesis ===
- Logan, Samuel T., ed. (1972). Hermeneutics and American Literature (PhD dissertation). Atlanta, Georgia: Emory University. OCLC 22149148.

=== Books ===
- Logan, Samuel T., ed. (1986). The Preacher and Preaching: Reviving the Art in the Twentieth Century. Phillipsburg, New York: Presbyterian and Reformed Publishing. ISBN 978-0-875-52294-4.
- ———; Barker, William S., eds. (2003). Sermons That Shaped America: Reformed Preaching from 1630 to 2001. Phillipsburg, New York: Presbyterian and Reformed Publishing. ISBN 978-0-87552-003-2.
- ———, ed. (2007). Confronting Kingdom Challenges: A Call to Global Christians to Carry the Burden Together. Wheaton, Illinois: Crossway Books. ISBN 978-1-581-34863-7.
- ——— (2013). Reformed Means Missional: Following Jesus into the World. Greensboro, North Carolina: New Growth Press. ISBN 978-1-938-26775-8.

=== Chapters ===
- ——— (1985). "Jonathan Edwards and the Northampton Awakening". Preaching and Revival. London: Westminster Conference. OCLC 796960195.
- ——— (1986). "The Phenomenology of Preaching". In ——— (ed.). The Preacher and Preaching: Reviving the Art in the Twentieth Century. Phillipsburg, New York: Presbyterian and Reformed Publishing. ISBN 978-0-875-52294-4.

=== Articles ===
- ——— (1974). "Theology And Literature: A Linguistic Approach". Westminster Theological Journal. 36 (3): 334ff.
- ——— (1980). "The Hermeneutics of Jonathan Edwards". Westminster Theological Journal. 43 (1): 79–96.
- ——— (1984). "The Doctrine of Justification in the Theology of Jonathan Edwards". Westminster Theological Journal. 46 (1): 26–52.
- ——— (1987). "The Origins of Modern Attacks on Biblical Authority". Westminster Theological Journal. 49 (1): 119–142.
- ——— (1988). "Where Have All The Tulips Gone? Being a Brief Treatise Discovering the Causes of the Decline of the Calvinistical Religion in New England Between 1630 and 1776". Westminster Theological Journal. 50 (1): 1–26.
- ——— (1991). "Academic Freedom at Christian Institutions". Christian Scholars Review. 21 (2): 14–17.
- ——— (1995). "Theological Decline in Christian Institutions and the Value of Van Til's Epistemology". Westminster Theological Journal. 57 (1): 145–63.

Academic offices
Preceded by George C. Fuller	President of Westminster Theological Seminary; 1991–2005	Succeeded by Peter Lillback
