= J. Alan Groves =

American biblical scholar and academic (1952-2007)

- Born: December 17, 1952; Springfield, Missouri, U.S.
- Died: February 5, 2007 (aged 54); Glenside, Pennsylvania, U.S.
- Education: Dartmouth College (B.A., B.Eng); Westminster Theological Seminary (M.A.R., Th.M.); Dropsie College; Vrije Universiteit (doctoral candidate)
- Occupation: Hebrew Bible scholar · Theologian · Educator · Technologist
- Years active: 1976–2007
- Organizations: Westminster Theological Seminary; J. Alan Groves Center for Advanced Biblical Research; Biblia Hebraica Quinta editorial board
- Known for: Pioneer of computer-driven Hebrew Bible text analysis; Professor of Old Testament at Westminster Theological Seminary; founding director of the Westminster Hebrew Institute (later renamed Groves Center)
- Spouse: Elizabeth "Libbie" Davis Groves
- Children: Four

James Alan Groves (December 17, 1952 – February 5, 2007) was a Hebrew Bible scholar, theologian, educator, and pioneer in the use of computer technology for the study of the Hebrew Bible. He was Professor of Old Testament at Westminster Theological Seminary in Glenside, Pennsylvania, and the founding executive director of the J. Alan Groves Center for Advanced Biblical Research.

== Early life and education ==
Groves was born in Springfield, Missouri in 1952, and attended high school in Aberdeen, South Dakota. He earned a Bachelor of Arts and Bachelor of Engineering from Dartmouth College in 1975, along with a Master of Arts in Religion in 1981 and a Master of Theology in 1983, both from Westminster Theological Seminary. He also did graduate work at Dropsie College of Hebrew and Cognate Learning and was a Ph.D. candidate at Vrije Universiteit, working on a doctoral thesis entitled “A Textlinguistic Analysis of Exodus 1-14.”

== Career and ministry ==
From 1976 to 1979, he served as pastor of the congregational church in West Fairlee, Vermont.

Groves served in a number of capacities at Westminster Theological Seminary from 1982 until his death, including full professor of Old Testament, Dean of Students, and Vice President of Academic Affairs.

== Computer technology and the study of the Hebrew Bible ==
Groves was a pioneer and leader in the application of computing and related technology to the study and teaching of the Hebrew Bible and language, a field in which he is acknowledged as one of the earliest visionaries and most influential scholars.

In 1986, Groves founded the Westminster Hebrew Institute — a center for the study of Biblical Hebrew linguistics through computing, which in December 2006 (shortly before his death) was renamed the J. Alan Groves Center for Advanced Biblical Research.

He was editor or co-editor of numerous electronic databases, including the Groves-Wheeler Westminster Electronic Hebrew Morphology of Biblia Hebraica Stuttgartensia, the Stuttgart Electronic Study Bible, the Westminster-Claremont-Michigan Electronic Text of Biblia Hebraica Stuttgartensia, and the Biblia Hebraica Quinta.

The Groves-Wheeler Morphology is incorporated into a majority of commercially available Bible software products that provide study of original language translation, including Accordance, BART, BibleWindows, BibleWorks, Gramcord, Logos, and WordSearch.

== Publications ==
=== Electronic Databases (Editor/Co-editor) ===
- Groves-Wheeler Westminster Electronic Hebrew Morphology of Biblia Hebraica Stuttgartensia
- Stuttgart Electronic Study Bible
- Westminster-Claremont-Michigan Electronic Text of Biblia Hebraica Stuttgartensia
- Biblia Hebraica Quinta

=== Book Series (Co-editor) ===
- The Gospel According to the Old Testament

=== Bible Versions (Contributor/Translator) ===
- Contributor or translator for multiple Bible versions

=== Reference Works (Contributor) ===
- Dictionary of Biblical Imagery
- Dictionary of the Theological Interpretation of Scripture
- Dictionary of the Old Testament: Historical Books
- The New Zondervan Pictorial Encyclopedia of the Bible
- Historical Dictionary of Major Biblical Interpreters
- Dictionary of the Old Testament: Poetical and Wisdom Books

== Personal life and death ==
In 1978, Groves married Elizabeth ("Libbie") Wendell Davis of Springfield, Vermont. They had four children - Alasdair, Rebeckah, Éowyn, and Alden. He died from mestastic melanoma on February 5, 2007.

== Legacy ==
In 2010, a festschrift in Groves' memory was published, entitled Eyes to See, Ears to Hear.
