= Richard L. Pratt Jr. =

American theologian and author

Richard Linwood Pratt Jr.
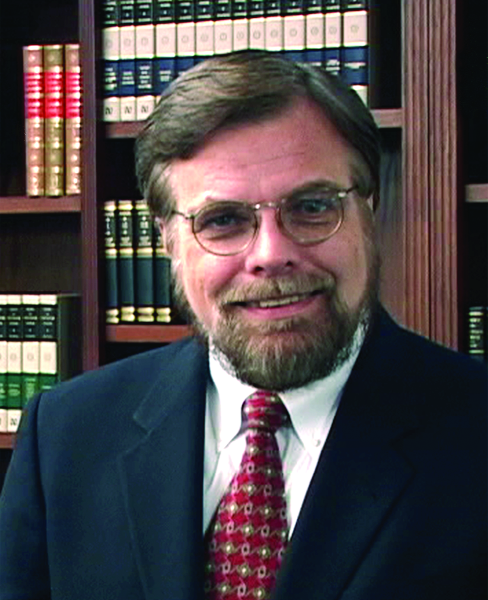
- Richard L. Pratt Jr.
- Born: October 17, 1953 (age 72); Roanoke, Virginia
- Occupations: Theologian, author
- Board member of: Founder and President of Third Millennium Ministries

Academic background
- Education: Roanoke College, Westminster Theological Seminary, Union Theological Seminary
- Alma mater: Harvard University (Th.D.)

Academic work
- Discipline: Biblical studies
- Institutions: Reformed Theological Seminary
- Notable works: 1 and 2 Corinthians (HNTC)

Richard Linwood Pratt Jr. (born October 17, 1953) is an American theologian, author, and founder and President of Third Millennium Ministries. Pratt claims that Third Millennium was launched in response to the lack of training of Christian leaders around the world, and that "where the church is growing the fastest, those Christian leaders have the least amount of training". The stated aim of Third Millennium is that any person that has the desire to learn more about the Bible should be given that opportunity in their own land, in their own language, and at no cost.

== Background and education ==
Pratt is actively involved in all aspects of ministry, including writing, teaching, and global advancement. He has traveled extensively throughout the world to evangelize and lecture, including Argentina, Australia, China, Colombia, Czech Republic, Ecuador, Indonesia, Mexico, Mongolia, Poland, Russia, Slovakia, Turkey, Ukraine, Cuba, the United Kingdom and throughout the United States. He is best known for his approach to Biblical hermeneutics, which places a heavy emphasis on the Kingdom of God.

Pratt taught Old Testament, Hebrew, and Hermeneutics at Reformed Theological Seminary in Jackson, MS, and Orlando, FL, for 21 years. He also chaired the Old Testament Department in Orlando and is currently adjunct professor of Old Testament at Reformed Theological Seminary. He received his B.A. from Roanoke College, studied at Westminster Theological Seminary, and received his M.Div. from Union Theological Seminary. He earned his Th.D. in Old Testament Studies from Harvard University. His thinking was greatly influenced by Cornelius Van Til among others.

== Selected publications ==
Pratt has written and edited numerous books, commentaries and journal articles. He is the general editor of the NIV Spirit of the Reformation Study Bible and a contributing translator for the New Living Translation. Some of his books include: Pray with Your Eyes Open, Designed for Dignity, and He Gave Us Stories. He has written commentaries on both Chronicles and Corinthians and is also a contributor to the Complete Literary Guide to the Bible. His books have been translated into several languages including Chinese (Mandarin), Russian and Spanish.

In 2014, a Festschrift was published in his honor. For the World: Essays in Honor of Richard L. Pratt Jr. included contributions from Bruce K. Waltke, William Edgar, and John M. Frame.

=== Books ===
- Every Thought Captive: A Study Manual For The Defense Of Christian Truth, 1979 ISBN 0-87552-352-8
- Pray With Your Eyes Open: Looking At God, Ourselves, And Our Prayers, 1988 ISBN 0-87552-378-1
- He Gave Us Stories: The Bible Student's Guide To Interpreting Old Testament Narratives, 1990 ISBN 0-87552-379-X
- Holy Bible: New Living Translation, 1996 (translator) ISBN 0-8423-8489-8
- 1 and 2 Chronicles: A Mentor Commentary, 1998 ISBN 1-85792-151-8 (also available online for free)
- Holman New Testament Commentary: 1 and 2 Corinthians with Ra McLaughlin, 2000 ISBN 0-8054-0207-1 (also available online for free)
- Designed For Dignity: What God Has Made It Possible For You To Be, 1993 ISBN 0-87552-508-3
- NIV Spirit of the Reformation Study Bible, 2003 (general editor) ISBN 0-310-92360-3

=== Articles and book chapters ===
- "Historical Contingencies and Biblical Predictions"
- "Does God Observe the Law of Contradiction? . . . Should We?"
- "Hyper-Preterism and Unfolding Biblical Eschatology"
- "To The Jew First: A Reformed Perspective" on evangelizing the Jews
- "I Want to Walk Free, but I Still Hear the Chains Rattling"
- "Relevance without Irreverence (How to Become All Things to All Men)"
- "Baptism as a Sacrament of the Covenant"
- "The Kingdom of God"
- "Jeremiah 31: Infant Baptism in the New Covenant"
- "The Regulative Principle"
- "Common Misunderstandings of Van Til’s Apologetics", part 1 and part 2

=== Lectures and sermons ===
Pratt has published a number of his sermons and lectures online. Some of them are listed here, all in MP3 format:

- "A sermon on 2 Chronicles 30"
- "The Vision of Christ in the Lord’s Prayer, (Matthew 6:9-13) "
