= Ralph Blair =

American psychotherapist

Ralph Blair is an American psychotherapist and founder of The Homosexual Community Counseling Center in New York City. In 1975, he founded Evangelicals Concerned, Inc. (or EC), a U.S.-wide network of gay and lesbian evangelical Christians and friends.

Blair founded EC to provide hope, encouragement, teaching and fellowship to gays and lesbians seeking to integrate their sexuality with a theologically sound and committed Christian faith. EC uses conferences, publications and other venues to spread the Good News of God's grace and peace in Christ to a people called to lives of grateful service. EC sponsors summer regional conferences, winter Bible study retreats, and fall preaching festivals. The latter focus on contributions from historical Christian leaders such as John Wesley, George MacDonald, John Newton and J. Gresham Machen. Blair also publishes a quarterly review of literature published about religion and literature.

For the Eastern and Western EC conferences, Blair invites as keynoters only evangelicals who support monogamous same-sex partnerships. These keynoters are invited only once.

== Education ==
Blair is a graduate of Bowling Green State University, The University of Southern California Graduate School of Religion, and The Graduate School of The Pennsylvania State University. He also studied at Bob Jones University, Dallas Theological Seminary, and Westminster Theological Seminary.

== Books ==
- Undoing Every Do / Doing Every Don't (The Ten Commandments, The Religious Right & The Lesbigay Left) (2000)
- Christ2000 (1999)
- One Foolishness or Another (1999)
- Trust (1996)
- Anger (1995)
- Homosexualities: Faith, Facts, and Fairy Tales (1991)
- Jesus Who? (1986)
- Hope's Gays and Gays’ Hopes (1983)
- Getting Close: Steps Toward Intimacy (1980)
- Homophobia in the Churches (1979)
- An Evangelical Look at Homosexuality (1972)
- Etiological and Treatment Literature on Homosexuality (1972)

== See also ==
- LGBT-welcoming church programs
- Religion and homosexuality
- History of Christianity and homosexuality
- Queer Theology
- Category:LGBTQ religious organizations
