= Eugene Callender =

American pastor and civil rights activist (1926–2013)

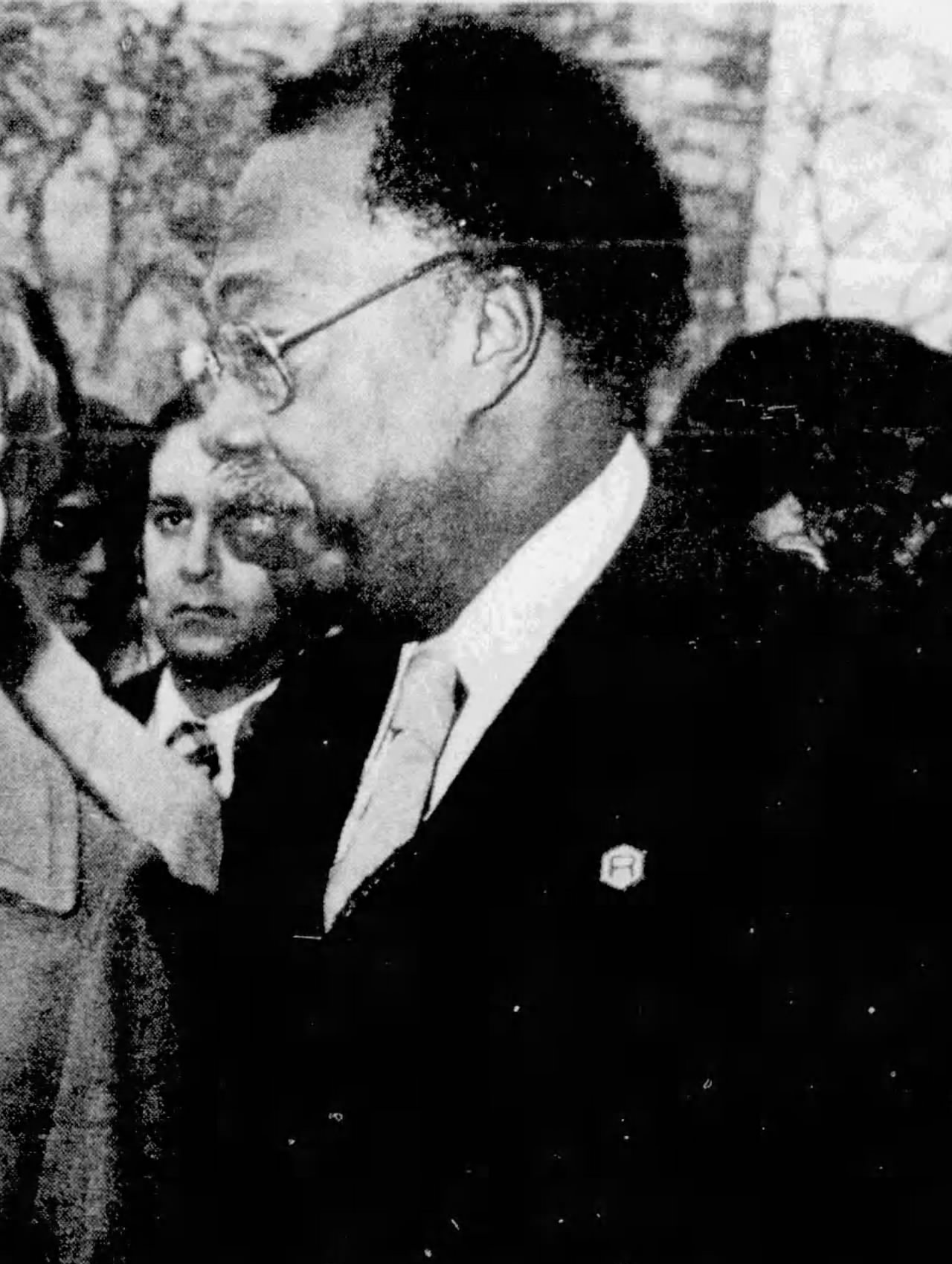
- Callender in 1977
- Born: Eugene St. Clair Callender; January 21, 1926; Cambridge, Massachusetts, U.S.
- Died: November 2, 2013 (aged 87); Manhattan, New York, U.S.
- Education: Cambridge Rindge and Latin School; Boston University; Westminster Theological Seminary; New York Law School
- Occupations: Pastor and activist

Dr Eugene S. Callender (January 21, 1926 – November 2, 2013) was an American pastor and activist in the civil rights movement. In 1970, he began co-hosting, with Joan Harris, the series Positively Black, the first major Black show on NBC, featuring Black artists, writers, actors, musicians, sports figures and activists, as well as news about life and culture in the community.

== Biography ==
Eugene St. Clair Callender was born in Cambridge, Massachusetts, to parents who were immigrants from Barbados.

He studied at Cambridge Rindge and Latin School and earned a B.A. degree from Boston University, before becoming the first African American to study at Westminster Theological Seminary, where he earned a Master of Divinity degree cum laude. He later studied at New York Law School.

For most of his life, Callender lived and worked in Harlem, New York. He was the first black ordained minister in the Christian Reformed Church in North America (CRCNA). A past executive director of the New York Urban League and a former president of the New York Urban Coalition, he also served as deputy administrator of the New York City Housing and Development Administration.

In 1970, Callender hosted (with Joan Harris, at its launch) the hour-long WNBC‐TV (Channel 4) series Positively Black, which aired weekly, featuring Black artists, writers, actors, musicians, sports figures and activists, as well as news about life and culture in the community.

Callender died on November 2, 2013, at the age of 87.
