= John Euiwhan Kim =

Korean-American theologian and pastor (1933–2010)

Dr. John Euiwhan Kim (김의환, November 19, 1933 – May 10, 2010) was an American theologian and pastor. He was born in Korea but educated in the US. He graduated from Calvin Theological Seminary (B.D.), Westminster Theological Seminary (Th.M.), and Temple University (Ph.D.). After founding and pastoring a Korean church in Los Angeles, where he also established International Theological Seminary, he returned to Korea to serve as president of Chongshin University and also later of Calvin University.
