= Westminster Seminary California =

Presbyterian school in Escondido, California

Coordinates: 33.1220°N 117.0468°W

- Type: Private Seminary
- Established: 1979
- Parent institution: Westminster Theological Seminary
- President: Joel Kim
- Faculty: 13
- Students: 98 (2025)
- Location: Escondido, California, United States
- Campus: Suburban
- Website: www.wscal.edu

Westminster Seminary California is a Reformed and Presbyterian Christian seminary in Escondido, California. It was initially a branch campus of Westminster Theological Seminary in Philadelphia until 1982 when it became fully independent. It has 13 full-time faculty members and enrolls approximately 155 full-time students.

== History and ecclesiastical affiliation ==
Westminster Seminary California was founded in 1979 and welcomed its first students in the fall of 1980. It is a multi-denominational seminary in the Presbyterian and Reformed tradition, with close relationships with several denominations, including the Presbyterian Church in America, Orthodox Presbyterian Church, United Reformed Churches in North America and Korean-American Presbyterian Church.

=== Escondido Orthodox Presbyterian Church ===
The Escondido Orthodox Presbyterian Church worships in the WSC Chapel. The congregation was founded in 2002 and has about 100 members. A number of members of the faculty are members of the congregation. The Pastor is Zach Keele, a Westminster graduate.

== Academics ==
Westminster Seminary California is accredited by the Western Association of Schools and Colleges and was first accredited by the Association of Theological Schools in the United States and Canada in 1997. The seminary offers a Master of Arts degree and a Master of Divinity degree.

== Theology ==
Westminster Seminary California is associated with the Reformed Two kingdoms doctrine. Andrew Sandlin has called this the "Escondido Theology".

== People ==
=== Notable faculty ===
Past and present notable faculty members include:

- R. Scott Clark
- Jay E. Adams
- Edmund Clowney
- Carl F. Ellis Jr.
- John Frame
- W. Robert Godfrey
- D. G. Hart
- Michael Horton
- Meredith Kline
- Michael J. Kruger
- David M. VanDrunen

=== Notable alumni ===
- Julius Kim, former president of The Gospel Coalition
- Lloyd Kim, coordinator of Mission to the World
- Matt Slick, founder of Christian Apologetics and Research Ministry
