= Chad Van Dixhoorn =

Canadian theologian, historian, and academic

Chad B. Van Dixhoorn
- Born: October 7, 1971 (age 54)
- Education: University of Western Ontario (B.A); Westminster Theological Seminary (M.Div, Th.M); University of Cambridge (Ph.D)
- Occupations: Professor, historian, theologian
- Notable work: The Westminster Assembly (Oxford, 2021); Confessing the Faith (Edinburgh, 2014); The minutes and papers of the Westminster Assembly, 5 vol. (Oxford, 2012)
- Theological work
- Era: 21st century
- Tradition or movement: Reformed

Chad B. Van Dixhoorn (born 1971), a Canadian-born theologian and historian, is the editor of the five-volume The Minutes and Papers of the Westminster Assembly: 1643-1652 published by Oxford University Press in 2012. In 2013 he was elected a Fellow of the Royal Historical Society in recognition of his work on the Westminster assembly. In 2014 Banner of Truth Trust published Van Dixhoorn's second work, Confessing the Faith: a reader's guide to the Westminster Confession of Faith.

Van Dixhoorn received his Ph.D. from the University of Cambridge, and was awarded a post-doctoral fellowship from the British Academy. He received theological training at Westminster Theological Seminary (M.Div., Th.M.) and is a graduate of Huron College, The University of Western Ontario (BA). He was a member of the Faculty of History of the University of Cambridge from 2004 to 2008, he held three fellowships at Wolfson College, Cambridge, from 2004 to 2013, and he has taught history and theology at universities and seminaries in the UK and United States. Since 2013 Van Dixhoorn has served as an honorary research fellow in the School of History at the University of East Anglia, UK, advising Dr. Polly Ha as she produces a significant edition of early presbyterian texts to be published by Oxford University Press.

Van Dixhoorn formerly served as a pastor at Cambridge Presbyterian Church (UK) and then at Grace Presbyterian Church (Vienna, VA) for nine years, and is an ordained minister in the Orthodox Presbyterian Church.

In 2023, Van Dixhoorn was appointed Professor of Church History and Theology at Reformed Theological Seminary in Charlotte, N.C. He has previously served as Professor of Church History and the Director of the Craig Center for the Study of the Westminster Standards at Westminster Theological Seminary in Glenside, Pennsylvania. He has also lectured at Reformed Theological Seminary, Washington from 2008 to 2018; in 2013 he was appointed associate professor of Church History (RTS Washington), and in 2015 Chancellor's Professor of Historical Theology (RTS all campuses). He also served as an adjunct professor of Systematic Theology at Puritan Reformed Theological Seminary in Grand Rapids, Michigan and presently serves as an adjunct professor at the Reformed House of Studies at Wycliffe College, University of Toronto. He and his wife Emily have five children.
