= Peter Lillback =

American theologian and academic

The Reverend Dr. Peter A. Lillback
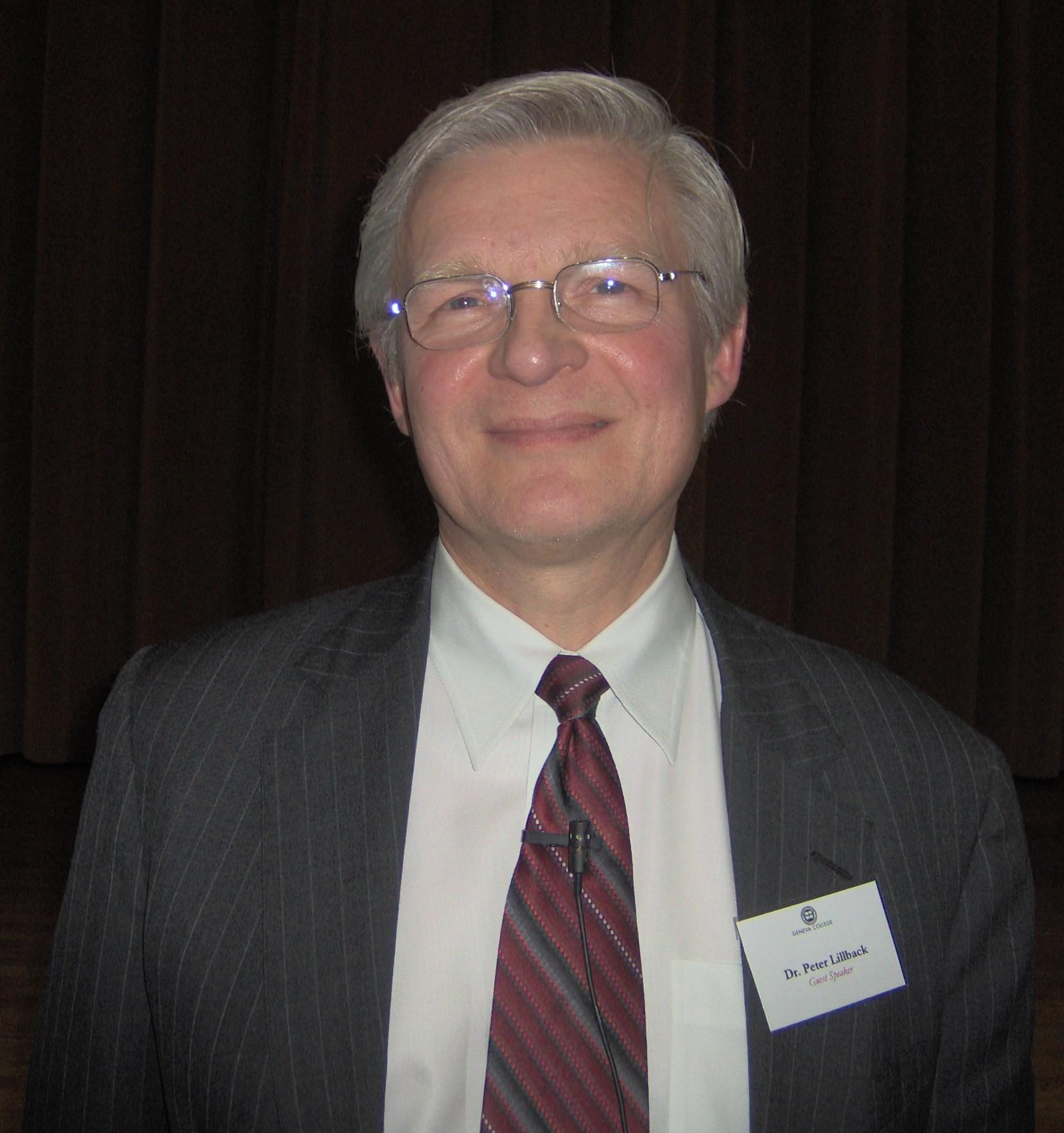
- Born: May 31, 1952
- Known for: Historical Theology
- Title: President of Westminster Theological Seminary
- Board member of: President, The Providence Forum

Academic background
- Education: Cedarville College (B.A.); Dallas Theological Seminary (Th.M.); Westminster Theological Seminary (Ph.D.)
- Alma mater: Westminster Theological Seminary
- Thesis: The Binding of God: Calvin's Role in the Development of Covenant Theology (1985)
- Doctoral advisor: D. Clair Davis

Academic work
- Discipline: Historical Theology
- Sub-discipline: Reformation and Post Reformation Studies
- Institutions: Westminster Theological Seminary

Religious life
- Religion: Christianity
- Denomination: Presbyterian
- Church: Presbyterian Church in America
- Profession: Teaching Elder

Peter A. Lillback is an American theologian and church historian, the president and professor of historical theology and church history at Westminster Theological Seminary in Glenside, Pennsylvania. He has held the presidency since 2005.

== Education and career ==
Lillback earned a B.A. from Cedarville University (1974), a Th.M. from Dallas Theological Seminary (1978), and a Ph.D. from Westminster Theological Seminary (1985). He was ordained in the Orthodox Presbyterian Church and holds credentials as a teaching elder in the Presbyterian Church in America.

He is the founder and president emeritus of the Providence Forum, an organization focused on the religious foundations of American governance. He also serves as senior editor of Unio cum Christo: An International Journal of Reformed Theology and Life.

Lillback is the author of George Washington's Sacred Fire (2006), a biographical work that argues Washington was a Christian rather than a deist.

== Works ==
=== Books ===
- Lillback, Peter A. (2001). The Binding of God: Calvin's Role in the Development of Covenant Theology. Baker Academic. ISBN 9780801022654.
- Lillback, Peter A. (2006). George Washington's Sacred Fire. Providence Forum Press. ISBN 9780978605261.
- Lillback, Peter A. (2007). Wall of Misconception: Does the Separation of Church and State Mean the Separation of God and Government?. Providence Forum Press. ISBN 9780978605254.
- Lillback, Peter A. (2008). Lessons on Liberty: A Primer for Young Patriots. Providence Forum Press. ISBN 9780978605292.
- Lillback, Peter A. (2010). Philadelphia Faith and Freedom Guide. Providence Forum Press. ISBN 9780978605308.
- Lillback, Peter A. (2012). George Washington & Israel. Providence Forum Press. ISBN 9780978605285.
- Lillback, Peter A. (2013). Annotations on a Letter That Changed the World from a Birmingham Jail. Providence Forum Press. ISBN 9780978605278.
- Lillback, Peter A. (2019). Saint Peter's Principles: Leadership for Those Who Already Know Their Incompetence. Reformation Heritage Books. ISBN 9781596381933.

=== Edited volumes ===
- Lillback, Peter A. (2008). Hall, David W. (ed.). A Theological Guide to Calvin’s Institutes: Essays and Analysis. P&R Publishing. ISBN 9781596380912.
- Lillback, Peter A. (2013). Gaffin, Richard B. (ed.). Thy Word Is Still Truth: Essential Writings on the Doctrine of Scripture from the Reformation to Today. P&R Publishing. ISBN 9781596384477.
- Lillback, Peter A. (2020). Wells, Paul; Stoker, Henk (eds.). A Covenantal Vision for Global Mission. P&R Publishing. ISBN 9781629957302.

=== Contributions ===
- K. Scott Oliphint, ed. (2007). "Justified in Christ: God's Plan for Us in Justification". Justified in Christ. Mentor. ISBN 9781845502461.
- "Biblical Perspectives on Business Ethics". Biblical Perspectives on Business Ethics: How the Christian Worldview Has Shaped Our Economic Foundations. Providence Forum Press. 2012. ISBN 9780978605315.

Academic offices
| Preceded by Samuel T. Logan | President of Westminster Theological Seminary; 2005-present | Incumbent |
