= Robert Dick Wilson =

American Bible scholar (1856–1930)

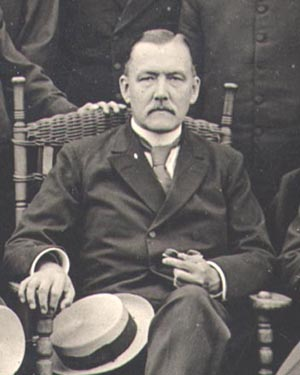
- Robert Dick Wilson at the Grove City Bible Conference in 1909
- Born: February 4, 1856; Indiana, Pennsylvania
- Died: October 11, 1930 (aged 74)
- Occupations: Linguist and Presbyterian scholar

Academic background
- Education: Princeton University
- Alma mater: Humboldt University of Berlin (PhD)

Academic work
- Institutions: Pittsburgh Theological Seminary; Princeton Theological Seminary; Westminster Theological Seminary

Robert Dick Wilson, PhD, DD (February 4, 1856 – October 11, 1930) was an American linguist and Presbyterian Old Testament scholar who devoted his life to prove the reliability of the Hebrew Bible. In his quest to determine the accuracy of the original manuscripts, Wilson learned 45 languages, including Hebrew, Aramaic, and Greek, as well as all the languages into which the Scriptures had been translated up to 600 AD.

== Biography ==
Wilson was born in Indiana, Pennsylvania. He proved himself an outstanding language student even as an undergraduate. While at Princeton University, he was able to read the New Testament in nine languages. He graduated from Princeton at the age of 20, later receiving a master's degree and doctorate before doing post-graduate work in Germany at the Humboldt University of Berlin. In 1883, Wilson became Professor of the Old Testament at Western Theological Seminary (later known as Pittsburgh Theological Seminary), where he had done some of his graduate studies. In 1900, he returned to Princeton as the William Henry Green Professor of Semitic Languages and Old Testament Criticism at Princeton Theological Seminary.

Throughout his career, he opposed the higher criticism, which held that the Bible was inaccurate on many points and not historically reliable. Professor Wilson wrote, "I have come to the conviction that no man knows enough to attack the veracity of the Old Testament. Every time when anyone has been able to get together enough documentary 'proofs' to undertake an investigation, the biblical facts in the original text have victoriously met the test" (quoted in R. Pache, The Inspiration and Authority of Scripture).

In the late 1920s, he left Princeton to teach at the new, conservative Westminster Theological Seminary. Among his other works, Wilson contributed articles to the International Standard Bible Encyclopedia, a noted Bible reference of the early 20th century.

== Works ==
=== Books ===
- Wilson, Robert D. (1891). Introductory Syriac Method and Manual. New York: Scribners. OCLC 4226955.
- ——— (1891). Elements of Syriac Grammar by an inductive method. New York: Scribners. OCLC 2062991.
- ——— (1892). Notes on Hebrew Syntax. Allegheny, PA: no publisher. OCLC 9313879.
- ——— (1901). The Lower Criticism of the Old Testament as a preparation for the higher criticism. Princeton, NJ: C. S. Robinson. OCLC 392518.
- ——— (1908). A Hebrew Grammar for Beginners. Leipzig: W. Drugulin. OCLC 3183062.
- ——— (1917). Studies in the Book of Daniel. Vol. 1. New York: Putnam.
- ——— (1919). The Present State of the Daniel Controversy. New York: Bible Teachers Training School.
- ——— (1922). Is The Higher Criticism Scholarly?. Chicago, IL: Sunday School Times.
- ——— (1926). A Scientific Investigation of the Old Testament. Philadelphia, PA: Sunday School Times.
- ——— (1927). The Radical Criticism of the Psalter. London: Victoria Institute. OCLC 8788815.
- ——— (1938). Studies in the Book of Daniel. Vol. 2. New York: Revell. ISBN 978-0-801-09530-6. OCLC 4618224.
- ——— (1979). Studies in the Book of Daniel. Grand Rapids, MI: Baker. ISBN 978-0-801-09530-6. OCLC 4618224. - in one volume

=== Articles ===
- ——— (1920). "The Names for God in the Old Testament". The Princeton Theological Review. 18 (3): 460–.
- ——— (1921). "The Names for God in the New Testament". The Princeton Theological Review. 19 (3): 392–.
- ——— (1925). "Aramaisms in the Old Testament". The Princeton Theological Review. 23 (2): 234–.
- ——— (July 1926). "The Headings of the Psalms". The Princeton Theological Review. 24 (3): 353–.

=== Manuscripts ===
- ———. The Robert Dick Wilson Manuscript Collection. Special Collections, Princeton Theological Seminary Library.

== See also ==
- Christian apologetics (field of study concerned with the defense of Christianity)

== Bibliography ==
- Nicks, Brian (Spring 2008). "Life and Work of Robert Dick Wilson". The Master's Seminary Journal. 19 (1): 91–106.
- Jackson, Wayne. "The Remarkable Robert Dick Wilson." Christian Courier (24 April 2000). Online. Last updated 28 January 2005. Viewed 3 April 2005.
- David B. Calhoun, Princeton Seminary, Vol. 2: The Majestic Testimony 1869-1929 (Edinburgh: Banner of Truth Trust, 1996), pp. 211–212.
- Walter C. Kaiser, "Robert Dick Wilson," in Bible Interpreters of the Twentieth Century: A Selection of Evangelical Voices, Walter A. Elwell and J. D. Weaver, eds., (Grand Rapids: Baker, 1999), pp. 73–81. ISBN 0-8010-2073-5
