= Richard F. Lovelace =

American theologian (1930–2020)

- Born: 1930; California, U.S.
- Died: November 4, 2020 (aged 89–90)
- Education: Yale College (B.A. Philosophy); Westminster Theological Seminary (B.Div.); Princeton Theological Seminary (Th.D.)
- Occupations: Theologian; Church historian; Author; Professor
- Years active: 1969–2020
- Organizations: Gordon‑Conwell Theological Seminary
- Known for: Professor of Church History at Gordon‑Conwell Theological Seminary (1969–1996)
- Notable work: Dynamics of Spiritual Life: An Evangelical Theology of Renewal (1979); The American Pietism of Cotton Mather (1979)
- Spouse: Betty Lee Agar
- Children: Three

Richard F. Lovelace (1930–2020) was an American theologian and professor of church history at Gordon-Conwell Theological Seminary. He wrote Dynamics of Spiritual Life: An Evangelical Theology of Renewal and other works on evangelical spirituality, church renewal, and American religious history.

== Early life and education ==
Richard Franz Lovelace was born in California in 1930 and spent his childhood in New Mexico. He moved to the northeastern United States for his university education, graduating from Yale College with a Bachelor of Arts in philosophy. Lovelace continued his theological education at Westminster Theological Seminary, where he earned a master's degree, and Princeton Theological Seminary, where he received a doctorate in theology. His 1968 doctoral thesis at Princeton was entitled Christian Experience in the Theology of Cotton Mather.

== Career ==
Lovelace was on the faculty of Gordon-Conwell Theological Seminary from 1969 to 1996 and remained active as an emeritus professor for many years afterward. He advocated a postmillennial understanding of Christian history influenced by Jonathan Edwards. Lovelace taught a course titled "Dynamics of the Spiritual Life," which became the basis for his 1979 book Dynamics of Spiritual Life: An Evangelical Theology of Renewal. In the book, Lovelace used the term "disenculturation" to describe the process by which churches distinguish Christian teaching from surrounding cultural assumptions. He regarded this process as important to church renewal. He wrote several other books during his career including a widely reviewed book entitled The American Pietism of Cotton Mather: Origins of American Evangelicalism, also published in 1979.

Lovelace wrote about spiritual renewal in contemporary Christianity as well as Puritan piety and historical revival movements. He also addressed issues surrounding homosexuality from an evangelical Christian perspective. Tim Keller and Charles Colson cited Lovelace's work as an influence. Lovelace contributed to the Peniel Bible Conference in Lake Luzerne, NY, and participated in the PCUSA General Assembly, advocating for various church policies. He also wrote a column for Charisma magazine on revival movements and church history.

== Personal life and death ==
Lovelace married Betty Lee (née Agar) in 1958, and they were married for fifty years until her death in 2009. They had three children: David, Margaret (Peg), and Jonathan. The Lovelaces were part of the Presbyterian Church USA and were involved in a church plant in Massachusetts in the late 1980s. Lovelace died on November 6, 2020.

== Publications ==
- Homosexuality and the Church, Fleming H. Revell Company (1978), ISBN 0800709527.
- The American Pietism of Cotton Mather: Origins of American Evangelicalism, W.B. Eerdmans Publishing (1979), ISBN 0802817505.
- Dynamics of Spiritual Life: An Evangelical Theology of Renewal, Inter-Varsity Press (1979), ISBN 0830854932.
- Homosexuality: What Should Christians Do About It?, Fleming H. Revell Company (1984), ISBN 1725202263.
- Renewal as a Way of Life: A Guidebook for Spiritual Growth, InterVarsity Press (1985), ISBN 0877845948.
