= John Murray (theologian) =

Scottish-born theologian and academic (1898–1975)

- Born: October 14, 1898; Bonar Bridge, Sutherland, Scotland
- Died: May 8, 1975 (aged 76)
- Occupation: Professor
- Notable work: Redemption Accomplished and Applied, Imputation of Adam's Sin
- Spouse: Valerie Knowlton
- Theological work
- Era: 20th century
- Tradition or movement: Reformed, Presbyterian

John Murray (14 October 1898 – 8 May 1975) was a Scottish-born Calvinist theologian who taught at Princeton Seminary and then left to help found Westminster Theological Seminary, where he taught for many years. He was ordained in the Orthodox Presbyterian Church in 1937.

== Early life and ministry ==
Murray was born in the croft of Badbea, near Bonar Bridge, in Sutherland county, Scotland. Following service in the British Army in the First World War (during which he lost an eye, serving in the Black Watch regiment) he studied at the University of Glasgow. Following his acceptance as a theological student of the Free Presbyterian Church of Scotland he pursued further studies at Princeton Theological Seminary under J. Gresham Machen and Geerhardus Vos, but broke with the Free Presbyterian Church in 1930 over that Church's handling of a discipline case in the Chesley, Ontario congregation concerning the Lord's Day. He taught at Princeton for a year and then lectured in systematic theology at Westminster Theological Seminary to generations of students from 1930 to 1966, and was an early trustee of the Banner of Truth Trust.

Besides the material in the four-volume Collected Writings, his primary published works are a commentary on the Epistle to the Romans (previously included in the New International Commentary on the New Testament series but now superseded by Douglas J. Moo's commentary), Redemption Accomplished and Applied, Principles of Conduct, The Imputation of Adam's Sin, Baptism, and Divorce.

== Later life ==
Murray preached at Chesley and Lochalsh from time to time until his retirement from Westminster Theological Seminary in 1966. He returned to Scotland, where he was connected with the Free Church of Scotland

Writing after a communion season at Lochalsh, Murray said, "I think I feel most at home here and at Chesley of all the places I visit." There had been some consideration that upon leaving the seminary, Murray might take a pastorate in the newly formed Presbyterian Reformed Church, but the infirmity of his aged sisters at the home place necessitated his return to Ross-shire, Scotland.

== Personal life and death ==
At the age of 69, Murray married Valerie Knowlton 7 December 1967. Together they had two children, one of whom died at a young age.

Murray died on May 8, 1975 at the age of 76.

== Works ==
- Murray, John (1952). Christian Baptism. Philadelphia, PA: Committee on Christian Education, Orthodox Presbyterian Church. ? pages
- Murray, John (1953). Divorce. Philadelphia, PA: Committee on Christian Education, Orthodox Presbyterian Church. ? pages
- Murray, John (1955). Redemption Accomplished and Applied. Grand Rapids: Eerdmans. ISBN 978-0-8028-1143-1. 192 pages
- Murray, John (1957). Principles of Conduct: Aspects of Biblical Ethics. Grand Rapids: Eerdmans. ISBN 978-0-8028-1144-8. 272 pages
- Murray, John (1959). The Imputation of Adam's Sin. Phillipsburg, NJ: Presbyterian and Reformed Publishing. ISBN 0-8755-2341-2. ? pages
- Murray, John (1959). The Epistle to the Romans. NICNT. Grand Rapids: Eerdmans. ISBN 978-0-8028-2506-3. 736 pages
- Murray, John (1960). Calvin on the Scriptures and Divine Sovereignty. ? pages

== Sources ==
- Murray, Iain Hamish (1984). The Life of John Murray: Professor of Systematic Theology, Westminster Theological Seminary, Philadelphia, Pennsylvania 1937-1966. ISBN 978-0-8515-1950-0.
- Murray, John (1982). The Collected Writings of John Murray (4 vols.). Edinburgh: Banner of Truth Trust. ISBN 0-85151-396-4.
