= Delta Kappa Epsilon Shant =

Historic fraternity house in Ann Arbor, Michigan

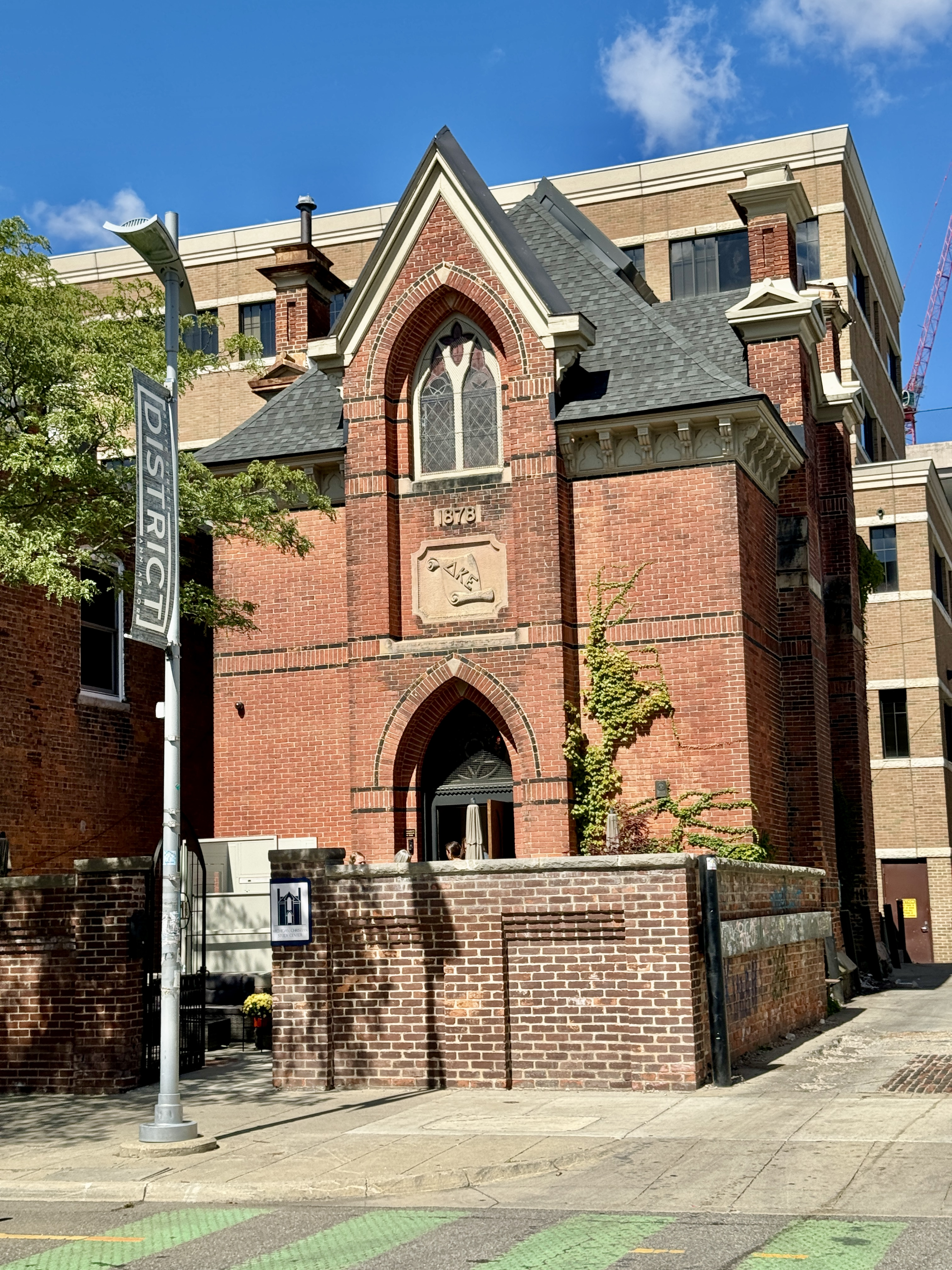
- The Shant in 2024
- Alternative names: Delta Kappa Epsilon Meeting House

General information
- Type: Fraternity meeting house
- Architectural style: Gothic Revival
- Location: 611 1/2 East William Street, Ann Arbor, Michigan
- Coordinates: 42°16′41″N 83°44′29″W
- Year built: 1878–1879
- Renovated: 1971, 2018
- Owner: Michigan Christian Study Center

Design and construction
- Architect: William Le Baron Jenney

The Delta Kappa Epsilon Shant (also DKE Shant) is an historic former fraternity meeting house in Ann Arbor, Michigan, near the campus of the University of Michigan. The "Shant" was built for the Delta Kappa Epsilon fraternity, and opened in 1879. It was designed by architect William Le Baron Jenney in the Gothic Revival style, resembling a French church.

The Shant opened as the meeting house of the fraternity's Omicron chapter, and has also served as its national headquarters. The building was remodeled for use as a church in 2018. Since 2022, the building has housed the Michigan Christian Study Center, an affiliate of the Consortium of Christian Study Centers.

== History ==
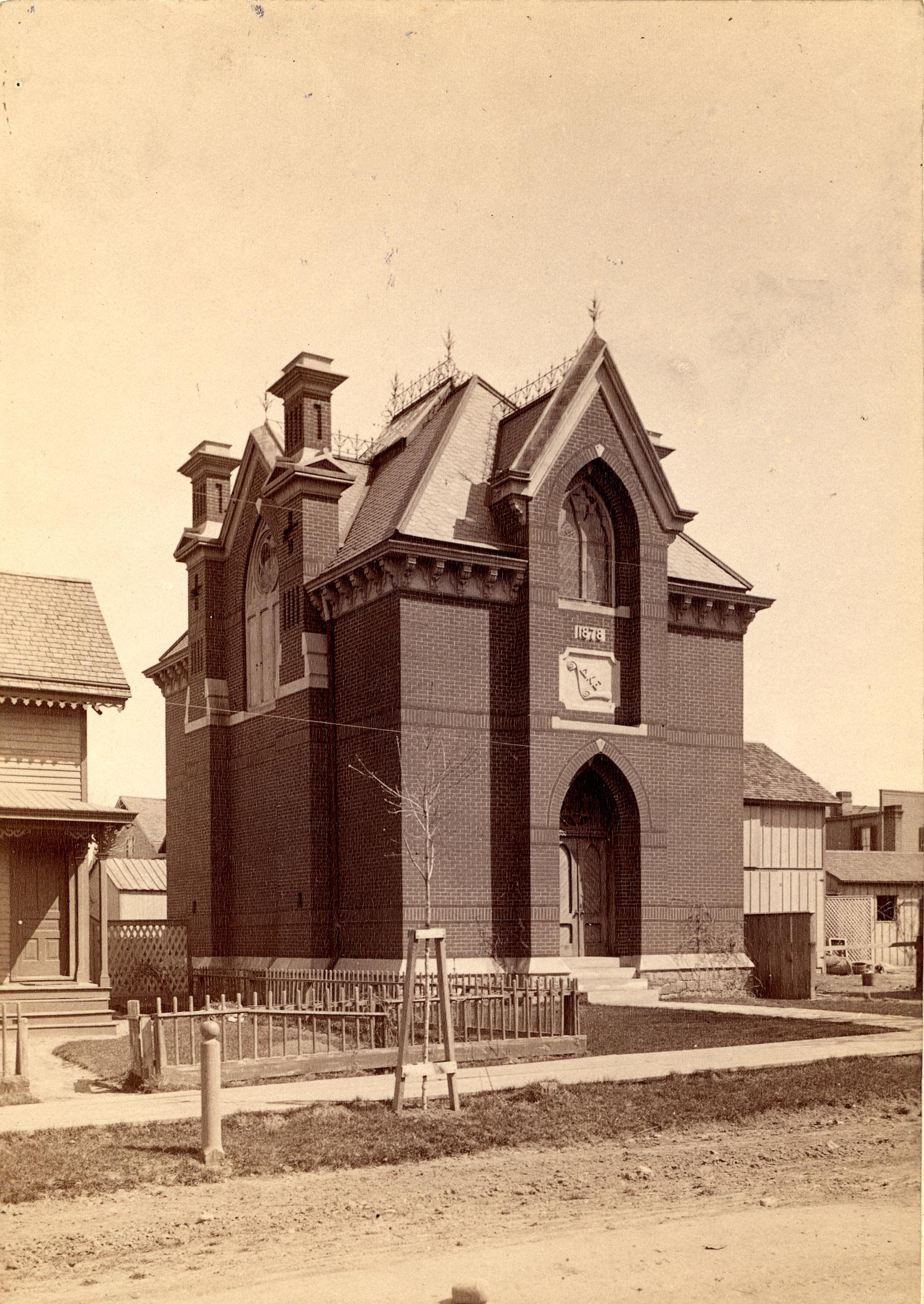
The Shant shortly after its construction

The Delta Kappa Epsilon fraternity was founded at Yale University in 1844, and its Omicron chapter at the University of Michigan was chartered in 1854. In 1872, a group of alumni formed the Omicron Literary Association to construct a meeting house for the chapter, which had previously met at the city's Masonic Temple.

The meeting house was designed by University of Michigan architecture professor William Le Baron Jenney, a prominent Chicago architect. Jenney went on to design the Home Insurance Building, which is considered one of the world's first skyscrapers. A parcel of land for the DKE meeting house was purchased for $2,300 (equivalent to $67,000 in 2025), and the alumni borrowed an additional $1,000 ($29,000) for the construction.

The building was officially named the "Hall of Omicron," but it was eventually nicknamed the "Shant." No record exists of the name's origin, although DKE leaders speculated in 2018 that it was a shortening of "shanty." The building served as the chapter's main meeting location from its opening until the 1970s, hosting chapter meetings and initiation rituals.

Historic American Buildings Survey drawing of the main entrance and window details

An 8-foot (2.4 m) brick wall was added to the Shant's front yard in 1901 for additional privacy. In 1948, a fire on the Shant's second floor damaged furniture and interior materials, with no injuries or damage to the fraternity's records. At that time, the building was used two to three times per month for nighttime chapter meetings. The Omicron chapter stopped holding regular meetings after its chapter house on Geddes Avenue burned down in October 1968.

After the chapter stopped holding meetings, the Shant was left in a semi-abandoned state for multiple years. The Shant was remodeled in the early 1970s, in an effort funded by the Omicron Literary Society, which retained ownership of the building when the chapter disbanded. The 1970s renovations added electricity to the structure, replacing the previous gas lighting, and reportedly removed a system of trapdoors and ropes used for hazing new members. The Ann Arbor Historic District Commission designated the building as a historic structure in 1973. Omicron chapter alumnus and then-Vice President Gerald Ford visited the Shant in the spring of 1974 after delivering the university's commencement speech.

The Omicron chapter was reorganized in 1977, purchasing a former sorority house on Olivia Avenue as its chapter house. By the 1980s, the Shant was open to the public as an event space. A 1983 advertisement described it as suitable for up to 140 people, with simple catering facilities available and full air conditioning. Ownership of the building was transferred to the Deke Foundation in 1987, after building maintenance expenses caused financial issues for the Omicron chapter. The Delta Kappa Epsilon international headquarters moved to the building in 2004.

Delta Kappa Epsilon listed the building for lease in 2014 after moving its headquarters to another location in Ann Arbor. Redeemer Ann Arbor, a newly founded church partially affiliated with the Acts 29 Network, purchased the building in 2017 for $780,000. Redeemer Ann Arbor began a renovation program to modernize the building, adding an elevator and expanding the basement for use as a childcare space. The first services were held in the fall of 2018. Redeemer Ann Arbor expanded its membership substantially in the following years, and outgrew the building after the COVID-19 pandemic. The Michigan Christian Study Center, an affiliate of the Consortium of Christian Study Centers, opened in 2022 in the building, and later purchased the building from Redeemer Ann Arbor.

== Architecture ==
The Delta Kappa Epsilon Shant is a Gothic Revival-styled two-story building, designed to resemble a church. The building's first floor is largely windowless, promoting its original secretive nature as a fraternity meeting house. Historians Marjorie Reade and Susan Wineberg described the building's architectural style as "a gem of nineteenth century Victorian eclecticism, having a basic Gothic character with Italianate trim."

=== Peer buildings ===
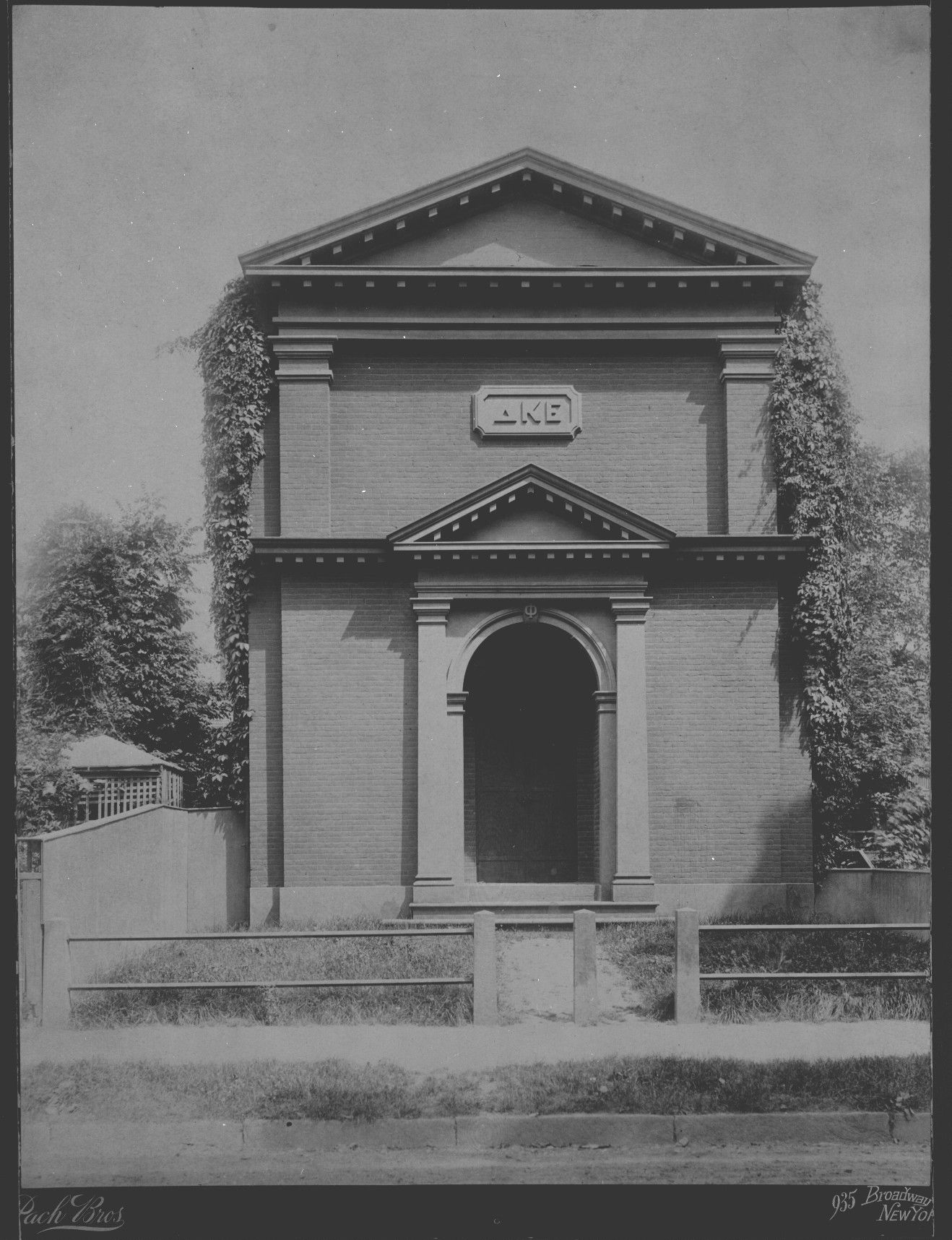
The now-demolished 1861 DKE meeting hall at Yale University

The Ann Arbor building was one of multiple similarly-styled meeting halls built for Delta Kappa Epsilon chapters, two of which survive. Neither are in active use as fraternity buildings.

The Phi chapter at Yale University built a windowless red brick meeting house in 1861, modeled after the 1856 Skull and Bones "Tomb". It and several similar fraternity houses were demolished in the early 20th century, and their site is currently occupied by the Memorial Quadrangle.

The Mu chapter at Colgate University met in the "Mu Temple" from its construction in 1877 until the chapter's dissolution in 2005. In 1994, the Mu Temple was moved approximately 1/4 mile (400 m) to place it adjacent to the fraternity's chapter house.

== See also ==
- Delta Kappa Epsilon Fraternity House (Champaign, Illinois)
- Delta Kappa Epsilon Fraternity House (Greencastle, Indiana)
- Deke House (Ithaca, New York)
