= Delta Kappa Epsilon Fraternity House =

Delta Kappa Epsilon Fraternity House may refer to:

- Delta Kappa Epsilon Fraternity House (Champaign, Illinois)
- Delta Kappa Epsilon Fraternity House (Greencastle, Indiana)

== See also ==
- Deke House (Ithaca, New York)
- Delta Kappa Epsilon Shant, in Ann Arbor, Michigan
