= Chesterton House =

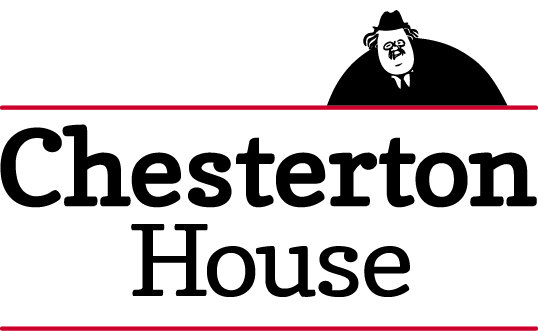
- Formation: 2000
- Founder: Karl E. Johnson
- Type: Non-profit 501(c)(3) organization
- Location: Ithaca, New York, US
- Executive director: Vivek C. Mathew
- Website: chestertonhouse.org

Chesterton House is a Christian study center and 501(c)(3) organization affiliated with Cornell University in Ithaca, New York, that works with the students, staff, faculty, and administration of Cornell to bridge the academy and the Christian church. The work of the organization has been mentioned in major media outlets such as the New York Times and Wall Street Journal.

== History ==
A group of pastors and professors in Ithaca, New York, came together to form Chesterton House in 2000 in order to "facilitate discovery of the intellectual riches of the historic Christian faith, thereby empowering more faithful Christian living." The study center is named after G. K. Chesterton, the British writer and humorist who influenced Mahatma Gandhi and C. S. Lewis.

According to their 2014 annual report, Chesterton House describes its residential community as "a cross between a fraternity and a monastery." They have an annual budget of over $500,000, 60 percent of which is donated. The remainder comes from program service revenue and special fundraisers, such as when the center issued a jazz CD featuring William Edgar and John Patitucci.

The Chesterton House residential living-learning community is situated on a two-acre property within walking distance of the Cornell campus. It consists of three structures—an English Tudor-style mansion that formerly served as a Greek house, a second large home formerly owned by Allan H. Treman, and a cottage. In addition to providing housing for over 30 students, the facilities include large common areas—living rooms, dining rooms, industrial kitchens, sunrooms, and libraries—as well as views of downtown Ithaca and Cayuga Lake.

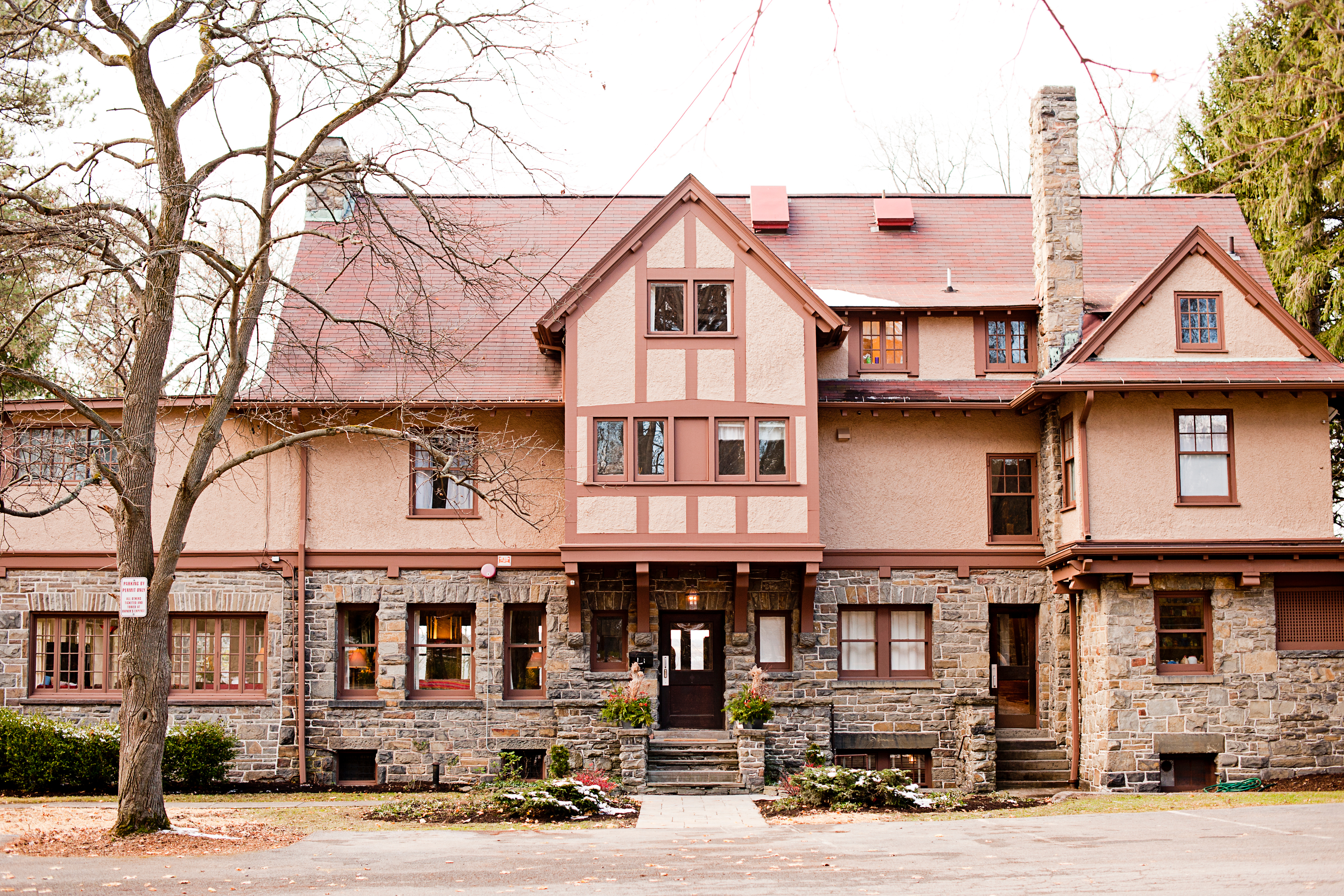
Chesterton House building on The Knoll.

The Founder and former Executive Director Karl E. Johnson, also a founding member and Executive Director of the Consortium of Christian Study Centers (CCSC), said in the Cornell Chronicle,"[W]e want to communicate that a proper study and understanding of religion helps facilitate human flourishing in all areas of life, whether in the arts, public policy, or the modern research university." Dick Keyes of L’Abri speaks of Chesterton House as a place where ideas are "argued, debated, persuaded, reasoned."

Chesterton House is an affiliate member of Cornell United Religious Work, which organizes all religious groups on Cornell's campus, including Cornell Hillel and the Cornell Catholic Community. Chesterton House's advisory board at one point included Ken Blanchard, Andy Crouch, D. A. Carson, Elaine Howard Ecklund, Ard Louis, and Eleonore Stump. There is also a Governing Board and a Faculty Advisory Board.

In 2013, 21 university campus ministry organizations were awarded $2.9 million from the Lilly Endowment in order to further their vocation-related programs. Chesterton House was one of four Christian study centers to receive the grant, including Hill House Ministries at the University of Texas at Austin, the Center for Christian Study at the University of Virginia, and the Christian Study Center of Gainesville at the University of Florida. The Oread Center in Kansas, also a member of the Consortium of Christian Study Centers, received part of a $4-million grant in 2014.

== Programs ==
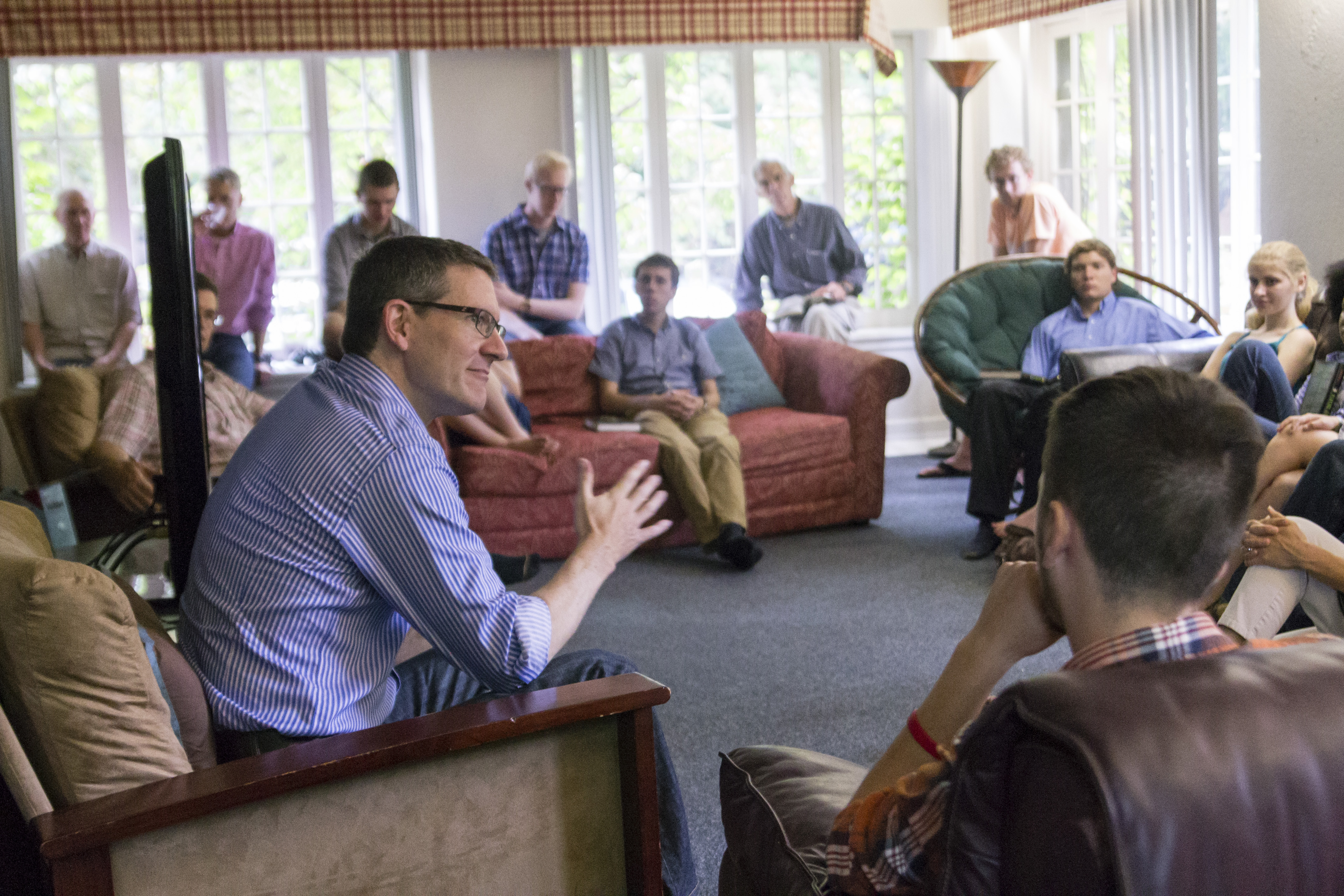
Author Andy Crouch at Chesterton House

All programs are categorized into three groups: events, residential, and courses.

Since 2000, as part of their "partnership model of ministry," Chesterton House co-sponsors events with academic departments, many local churches, and over a dozen campus ministries, including Chinese Bible Study, Cru, FCA, Navigators, InterVarsity, as well as Graduate Christian Fellowship and the graduate student fellowships at the Cornell Law School and the Johnson Graduate School of Management. Chesterton House regularly hosts public lectures on topics such as art, culture, economics, faith and science, food security, human trafficking, race, technology, and theology. The organization's Beimfohr-Neuss Lecture Series, which addresses issues pertaining to faith in a pluralistic society, has been delivered by Dr. Warren Kinghorn, Dr. Mia Chung, Dr. C. Jimmy Lin, Joel Salatin, Dr. Felicia Wu Song, and Richard Stearns. Other past speakers include Makoto Fujimura, Lisa Sharon Harper, Philip Jenkins, Robin Jensen, Richard Mouw, Mark Noll, Alvin Plantinga, Cornelius Plantinga, Sir John Polkinghorne, Eleonore Stump, Nicholas Wolterstorff, Dr. Jeremy Begbie.. In 2020, Chesterton Perspectives began, a series of speakers from a wide range of perspectives, discussing complex issues in a way that are pastorally sensitive as well as intellectually courageous, allowing space on campus to engage empathetically with diverse views.

In 2010 Chesterton House established "residential living learning centers" in which dozens of men and women participate each year. This includes a Sunday night weekly meal, cooking, cleaning, regular prayer and Scripture reading, daily devotions, an annual retreat, and semester service projects.

In 2014, in conjunction with Gordon College, Chesterton House began offering courses for credit in biblical studies. Past courses include studies of the book of Mark, hermeneutics, the book of Proverbs, the book of Job, the Old Testament, happiness, desires, and vocation. In 2020, a new course initiative, Logos Seminar, was introduced. An innovative year-long introduction to the classical Christian moral tradition and its critics, this guided journey allows students to explore the tradition, receive a fuller presentation of the orthodox Christian approach to moral theology, and hear from world-class Christian scholars. This earned Chesterton House an Oases of Excellence designation from the American Council of Trustees and Alumni (ACTA).

In October 2019, Chesterton House held a large 20th anniversary celebration that included a conference featuring Andy Crouch and many other alumni as speakers, a concert by performing artist Joy Ike, and the dedication of a new women’s residential ministry house. The event coincided with a transition in leadership to the new and current Executive Director, Dr. Vivek Mathew, who completed his Ph.D. at Cornell in 2019.

Other regular events at Chesterton House and other Christian study centers include retreats, conferences, discussion groups, and film viewings. Chesterton House staff advise several student organizations, including Cornell Claritas, a journal, and student chapters of Christian Legal Society, International Justice Mission, and Veritas Forum.

== See also ==
- Cru (Christian organization)
- Fellowship of Christian Athletes
- International Justice Mission
- InterVarsity Christian Fellowship
- The Navigators (organization)
- Christian Study Center
