= William Dyrness =

American theologian and academic (born 1943)

William A. Dyrness
- Born: January 23, 1943 (age 83); Geneva, Illinois
- Occupations: Professor of theology and culture at Fuller Theological Seminary
- Board member of: Theology Through the Arts, Christians in the Visual Arts, Development Associates International & editorial board of the International Journal of Systematic Theology & The Society for Arts in Religious and Theological Studies

Academic background
- Education: Wheaton College, Columbia Theological Seminary, Fuller Theological Seminary, University of Strasbourg, Vrije Universiteit
- Alma mater: University of Cambridge

Academic work
- Discipline: Biblical theology
- Institutions: New College Berkeley; Nairobi Evangelical Graduate School of Theology; Fuller Theological Seminary
- Main interests: Conjunction of reformed, evangelical, global and ecumenical theology
- Website: fuller.edu/faculty/wdyrness/

William A. Dyrness is an American theologian and professor of theology and culture at Fuller Theological Seminary. He teaches courses in theology, culture, and the arts, and is a founding member of the Brehm Center.

== Education ==
Dyrness holds a B.A. from Wheaton College, a B.A. from Columbia Theological Seminary, a B. Div. from Fuller Theological Seminary, a D. Théol. from the University of Strasbourg, a Doctorandus from the Vrije Universiteit, and was a postdoctoral fellow at the University of Cambridge in 1978 and again in 2000.

== Academic career ==
Dyrness joined the Fuller faculty in 1990 and served as dean of the School of Theology from 1990 to 2000. Before coming to Fuller he served as professor and president at New College Berkeley (1982–1990), professor and acting dean at Nairobi Evangelical Graduate School of Theology and program director and co-founder of the Institute for Studies in Asian Church Culture. He has been a visiting professor at Asian Center for Theological Studies and Mission, Asian Theological Seminary, Gordon-Conwell Theological Seminary and Regent College.

He has served on a number of boards including the Theology Through the Arts steering committee (1997–2000), the national board of Christians in the Visual Arts (1999 to 2005), the editorial board of the International Journal of Systematic Theology (2001 to present), The Society for Arts in Religious and Theological Studies (2005 to present), and on the board of Development Associates International (2000 to the present). He is also a senior fellow at USC's Center for Religion and Civic Culture (since 2000) and consulting editor for Christianity Today(1996 to present).

His books Modern Art and the Life of a Culture (with Jonathan Anderson) and Insider Jesus won a 2017 Christianity Today award of merit.

He is an ordained minister in the Presbyterian Church (USA).

== Influences ==
Dyrness works at the intersection of Reformed, evangelical, global and ecumenical theology. His numerous publications can be characterized as an attempt to grapple with "the dramatic encounter between faith and human culture." Dyrness's 1971 book on the twentieth-century French Catholic painter Georges Rouault influenced an entire generation of Christian visual artists. Dyrness studied with noted Christian philosopher and art historian Hans Rookmaaker, and is considered a leading expert on Christian theology and visual culture.

== Writings ==
Dyrness has published work in a variety of fields, including theology and culture, apologetics, theology and art, and global missions. In addition to numerous articles he is the author or editor of some twenty books, some cooperatively.

- Modern Art and the Life of a Culture: The Religious Impulses of Modernism. Downers Grove: IVP Academic. 2016. ISBN 978-0830851355.
- Insider Jesus. Downers Grove, IL: IVP Academic. 2016. ISBN 978-0830851553.
- Poetic Theology. Wm. B. Eerdmans Publishing Co. 2011. ISBN 978-0802865786.
- A Primer on Christian Worship. Wm. B. Eerdmans Publishing Co. 2009. ISBN 978-0802860385.
- Global Dictionary of Theology. IVP Academic. 2008. ISBN 978-0830824540.(co-edited with Veli-Matti Kärkkäinen)
- Senses of the Soul: Art and the Visual in Christian Worship. Wipf & Stock. 2008. ISBN 978-1556358647.
- Reformed Theology and Visual Culture: The Protestant Imagination from Calvin to Edwards. Cambridge University Press. 2004. ISBN 978-0521833233.
- Visual Faith. Baker Academic. 2001. ISBN 978-0801022975.
- Changing the Mind of Missions. IVP Books. 2000. ISBN 978-0830822393.(with James F. Engel)
- The Earth is God's: A Theology of American Culture. Wipf & Stock Pub. 1997. ISBN 978-1592447954.
- Emerging Voices in Global Christian Theology. Wipf & Stock Pub. 1994. ISBN 978-1592444472.
- Invitation to Cross-cultural Theology. Zondervan. 1992. ISBN 978-0310535812.
- Learning About Theology from the Third World. Zondervan. 1990. ISBN 978-0310209713.
- How Does America Hear the Gospel?. Wm. B. Eerdmans Publishing Co. 1989. ISBN 978-0802804372.
- Let the Earth Rejoice: A Biblical Theology of Holistic Mission. Wipf & Stock Pub. 1983. ISBN 978-1579101251.
- Christian Apologetics in a World Community. Wipf & Stock Pub. 1982. ISBN 978-1579109684.
- Themes in Old Testament Theology. IVP Academic. 1980. ISBN 978-0877847267.
- Christian Art in Asia. Editions Rodopi B.V. 1979. ISBN 978-9062037322.
- Roualt: A Vision of Suffering and Salvation. Eerdmans. 1971.(no ISBN)
