= William Edgar (apologist) =

American missionary, theologian, and academic

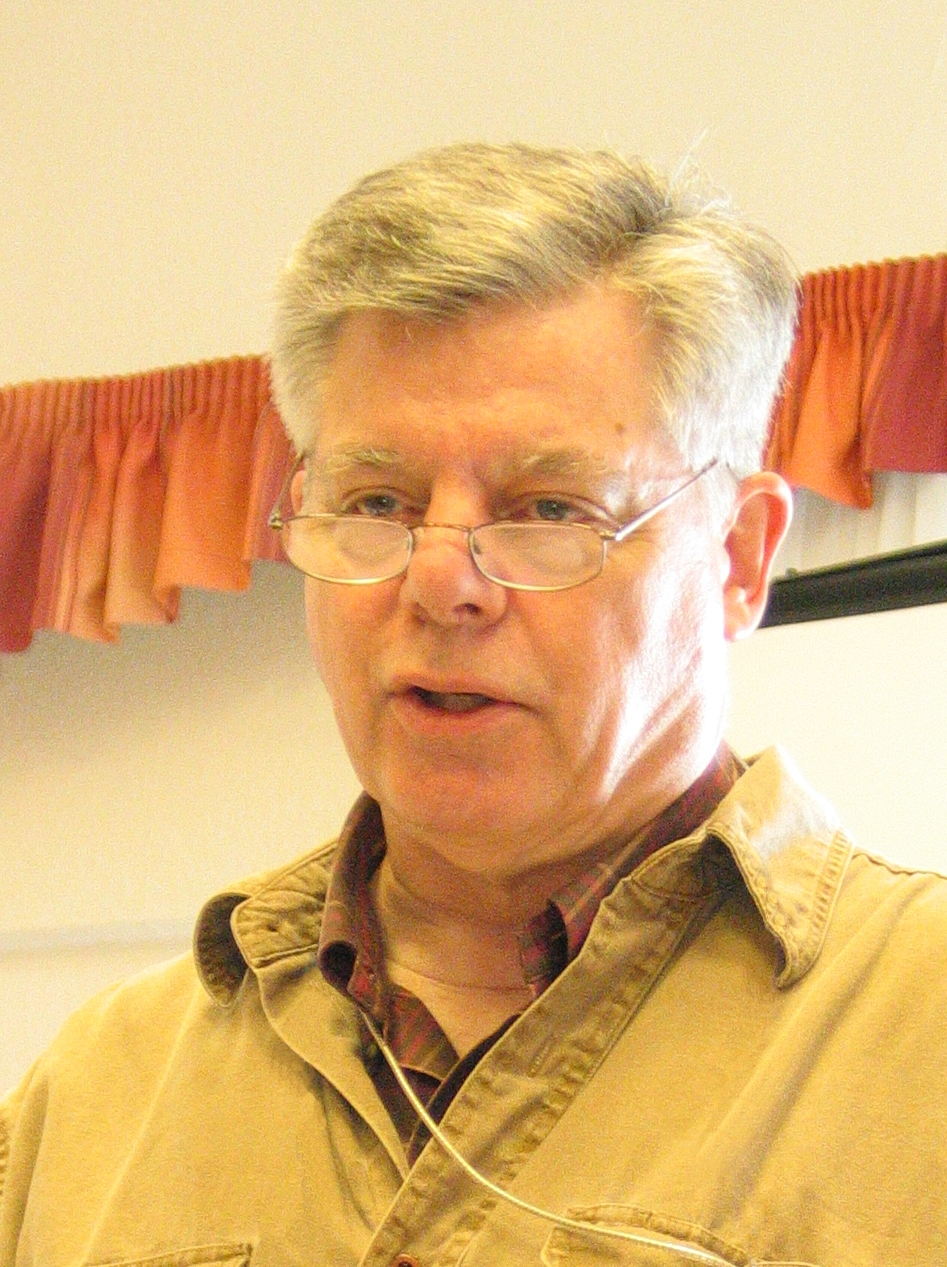
- Born: 1944 (age 81–82); Wilmington, North Carolina, U.S.
- Education: Harvard University (BA); Westminster Theological Seminary (MDiv); University of Geneva (ThD); fr:Faculté Jean-Calvin (DDiv)
- Occupations: Professor, Author, Theologian, Apologist
- Notable work: La carte protestante; Truth in All Its Glory: Commending the Reformed Faith; Does Christianity Really Work?; Created and Creating; The Christian Mind
- Theological work
- Era: 20th and 21st century
- Tradition or movement: Reformed

William "Bill" Edgar (born 1944) is an American theologian and Christian apologist. He was a professor of apologetics at Westminster Theological Seminary. Charles Colson described him as "one of evangelicalism's most valued scholars and apologists".

== Biography ==
Edgar grew up in Paris, New York and Geneva. He graduated from Harvard University with a Bachelor of Arts in music with honors in 1966, earned his M.Div. from Westminster Theological Seminary in 1969, and obtained his Doctor of Theology (Dr. Théol.) from the University of Geneva in 1993. He served as home missionary of the Orthodox Presbyterian Church, Pennsylvania, 1969–1970. Between 1970 and 1978, he taught at the Brunswick School in Greenwich, Connecticut, and 1979–89 at the Faculté Libre de Théologie Réformée, in Aix-en-Provence, France, where he continues as Professeur Associé.

Since 1989, he has been professor of apologetics at Westminster Theological Seminary. He is also coordinator of the Apologetics Department and director of the Gospel and Culture Project. He was chairman of the faculty until 2010. He is an ordained teaching elder in the Presbyterian Church in America since 1978.

Edgar is married to Barbara Smyth Edgar. They have two children, William Keyes Hill-Edgar and Deborah Boatwright Edgar.

== Learned societies, boards and ministries ==
Edgar is a member of American Musicological Society, the Evangelical Theological Society, the Forum on Music and Christian Scholarship, the American Historical Association and the Society for Ethnomusicology. He is also a senior fellow at the Trinity Forum.

He is president of the Huguenot Fellowship Director of the Gospel & Culture Project and serves on the Institutional Review Board and the Medical Ethics Committee of the Chestnut Hill Hospital. He is a fellow at the Wilberforce Forum and at Colson Center, honors trustee at the Greenwood School, and senior fellow at the Trinity Forum. He is on the editorial advisory committee of La Revue Réformée. He speaks regularly at the Veritas Forum programs. He frequently participates in the China Christian Scholars Association, and often travels to China. He has taught in French-speaking Africa in several countries.

== Interests ==
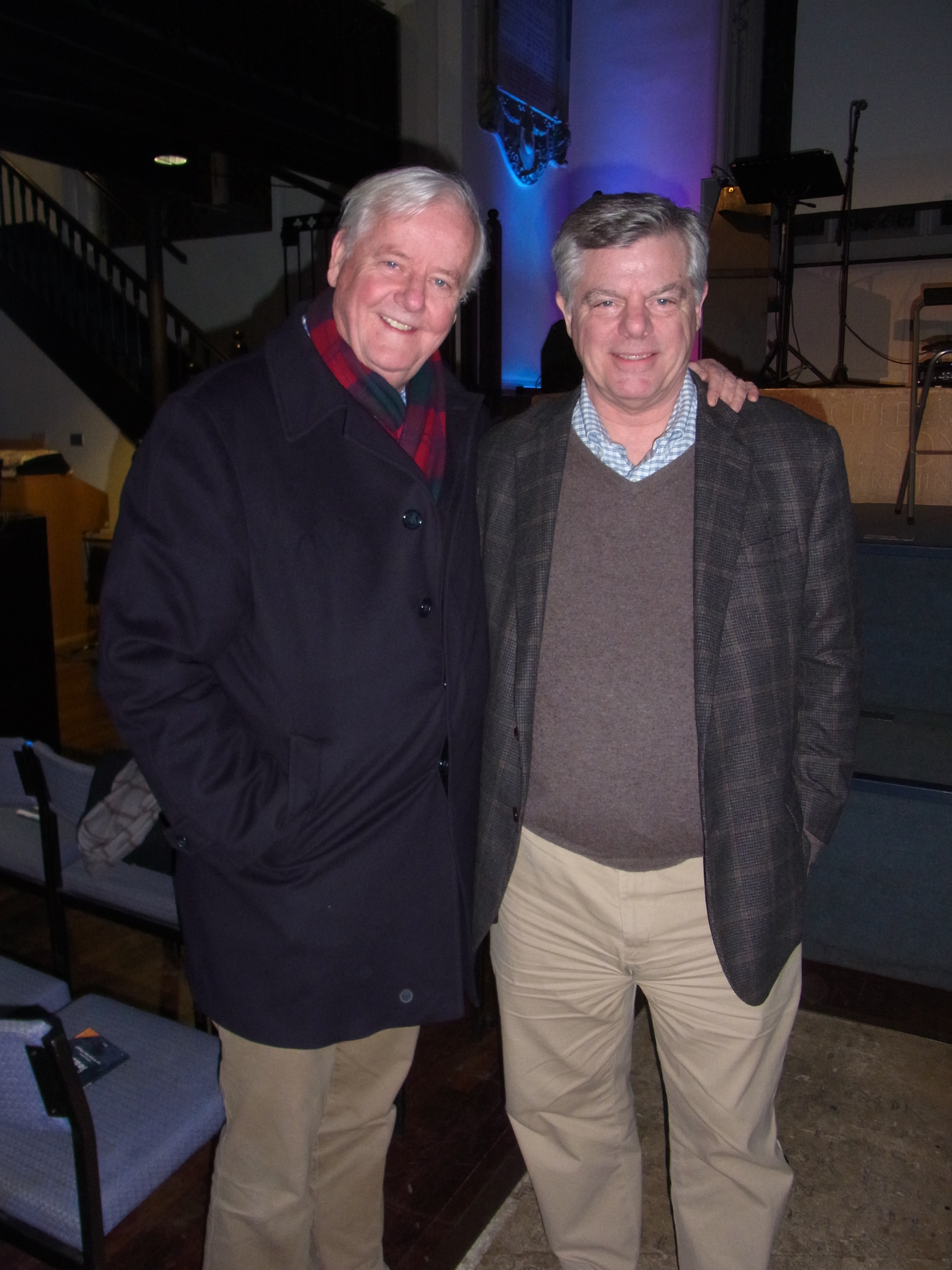
Bill Edgar and Os Guinness at the CICCU main event 2013, St Andrew the Great, Cambridge

In his books and articles, Edgar has treated topics such as cultural apologetics, the music of Brahms, the Huguenots, and African-American aesthetics.

Edgar is a jazz pianist and regularly performs an evening concert combined with a lecture on the history of jazz. In 2007, it was recorded live on a double-CD, Heaven in a Nightclub, during a benefit concert for Chesterton House, a Center for Christian Studies at Cornell University. The concert and recording feature Edgar, vocalist Ruth Naomi Floyd, saxophonist Joe Salzano, and bassist John Patitucci. His compositions include La Sainte Victoire, which premiered in Aix-en-Provence, June, 2007. He has also set the Psalms to music in an African mode. He manages a professional jazz band, Renewal.

== Bibliography ==
- Taking Note of Music. London 1986, SPCK
- Reasons of the Heart. 1996, Baker/Hourglass
- La carte protestante. 1997, Labor et Fides
- The Face of Truth: Lifting the Veil. 2001, P & R, 2001
- Truth in All Its Glory: Commending the Reformed Faith. 2004, P & R
- Les dix commandements. 2007, Excelsis
- Christian Apologetics Past and Present: A Primary Source Reader: Volume 1, To 1500. 2009, Crossway
- Beyond the Frame. 2010, Trinity Forum, 2010
- Christian Apologetics Past and Present: A Primary Source Reader: Volume 2, From 1500. 2011, Crossway
- Schaeffer on the Christian Life: Countercultural Spirituality. Forthcoming 2013, Crossway
