= Greenwood School =

Greenwood School or The Greenwood School may refer to:

- Greenwood School (Greenwood, Arkansas), recognized by Arkansas as historic site in Greenwood, Arkansas, at least nominated if not yet listed on the National Register of Historic Places (NRHP)
- Greenwood School, operated by the Hamilton County School District of Hamilton County, Florida
- Greenwood School (Des Moines, Iowa), NRHP-listed in Polk County, Iowa
- Greenwood School (West Whiteland, Pennsylvania), NRHP-listed
- Old Greenwood High School, Greenwood, South Carolina, NRHP-listed
- The Greenwood School (Putney, Vermont), a school for boys with learning disabilities, featured in the 2014 Ken Burns documentary The Address
- Greenwood Elementary School, River Falls, Wisconsin
- Greenwood School (Seattle), an elementary school
