= Sharon Gerbode =

American physicist researching biomechanics

Sharon J. Gerbode is a soft matter physicist and the Iris and Howard Critchell Associate Professor of Physics at Harvey Mudd College. She is recognized for her contributions to the fields of soft matter and biomechanics and is a 2016 Cottrell Scholar, a distinction given to top early career academic scientists by the Research Corporation for Science Advancement (RCSA).

== Education ==
Gerbode obtained her B.S. in physics at the University of California, Santa Cruz in 2003, where she worked on her senior thesis with Bruce Schumm. She earner her Ph.D. in soft condensed matter physics research under the guidance of Itai Cohen at Cornell University. In 2010, Gerbode began working as a postdoctoral fellow at Harvard University with Lakshminarayanan Mahadevan, where she researched mechanical behaviors observed in coiling tendrils of the cucumber plant.

== Academic career ==
In 2012, she joined Harvey Mudd College as the Iris and Howard Critchell assistant professor in the physics department. In 2018, Gerbode was promoted and became an associate professor of physics.

== Research and achievements ==
Gerbode works on studying dynamics in experimental two-dimensional colloidal crystals and plant biomechanics, notably on cucumber tendrils. Her work has been featured in the Cornell Chronicle, the American Physical Society's Physics, and NPR. According to Scopus, Gerbode's publications have received over 431 citations and her h-index is 10.

== Honors and awards ==
- Cottrell Scholar (2016) by Research Corporation for Science Advancement (RCSA)
