= Orson William Stow =

American politician (1820–1883)

Orson William Stow (May 30, 1820 – November 10, 1883) was an American manufacturer and state legislator.

== Biography ==
Stow was born in Rocky Hill, Connecticut, May 30, 1820, the elder son of Solomon and Eunice (Shepherd) Stow, and entered Yale College in the spring of the Sophomore year. In 1844, he was one of the fifteen founders of the fraternity Delta Kappa Epsilon. He graduated from Yale in 1846. The same year with his graduation he entered the Yale Divinity School, finishing the course in 1849.

His health, to his great disappointment, hindered his asking at the time for a license to preach; and in June 1849, he engaged with his father and brother in his native place in manufacturing tools for workers in tin and sheet iron, hoping soon to be able to return to his profession. But his health continued poor for eight years; after that date, his strength recovered, but he continued in successful manufacturing business, having also marked success as an inventor.

His business was removed to Plantsville, in Southington, Connecticut in 1852, and from 1871 until his death he held the vice-presidency of the Peck, Stow and Wilcox Manufacturing Company; he was also president of the Southington Water Company, and a director in other local enterprises. He represented the town in the Connecticut Legislature from 1873 to 1877. Though thus engaged he did not lose sight of the ends which actuated his theological study. He took an active part in the formation of the Congregational Church in Plantsville, and held office in it for many years.

He died, suddenly, in Plantsville, of rheumatism of the heart, November 10, 1883, in his 64th year. He married, June 13, 1849, Sarah, second daughter of Stephen Walkley of Southington, who survived him with their son and daughter.

This article incorporates public domain material from the 1884 Yale Obituary Record.
