= New College Berkeley =

Christian study center in Berkeley, California, U.S.

- Motto: Latin: Novitate Vitae Ambulemus
- Motto in English: Let Us Walk in the Newness of Life (Rom 6:4)
- Type: Christian Study Center
- Established: 1977
- Religious affiliation: Christian
- Academic affiliations: Graduate Theological Union
- Director: Craig Wong
- Location: PO Box 4328, Berkeley, California, U.S.
- Website: www.newcollegeberkeley.org

New College Berkeley is a Christian study center affiliated with the Graduate Theological Union (GTU) and located near the University of California, Berkeley. Through seminars, workshops, classes, conferences, a lectureship, retreats, publications, and a certificate cohort program, NCB seeks to “discern gospel faithfulness together in the San Francisco Bay Area.” NCB is a “third space,” cultivating gospel imagination and spiritual friendship that bridges church and academic interests, lay and ordained needs, majority and minority communities, younger and older generations, and historic and emergent ecclesial traditions. NCB is a member of the Consortium of Christian Study Centers.

== History ==
NCB was founded in 1977 by a group of Christians pastors, laypeople, and scholars led by Dr. David Gill and the Rev Dr. Earl Palmer of First Presbyterian Church, Berkeley. Their goal was to provide interdisciplinary, graduate-level Christian studies for laypeople seeking to “think Christianly” about their vocations and their cultural and professional contexts. Gill had been involved with Jack Sparks and the Christian World Liberation Front, and its offshoot, the Christian Liberation University of Berkeley, which became the Crucible. These developments took place in the larger context of the 1960s-70s Counterculture, Free Speech Movement, Free University movement, Teach-ins, and Jesus People movement.

Church historian Charles E. Cotheman, groups NCB with the C.S. Lewis Institute (founders James Houston and James R. Hiskey, 1976, Virginia), Ligonier Valley Study Center (founder R. C. Sproul, 1971, Pennsylvania, now Florida), and the Center for Christian Study (founder Daryl Richman, 1975, Virginia); and traces these four centers back to L’Abri (founders Francis and Edith Schaeffer, 1955, Huémoz-sur-Ollon, Switzerland) and Regent College (founder James Houston, 1968, Vancouver), with some additional influence from the Institute for Christian Studies (founder Hendrik Hart, 1967, Toronto).

In its first era (1977-94), NCB was an independent, degree-granting institution. It acquired WASC candidacy in 1988 and in 1993 became an affiliate of Berkeley's Graduate Theological Union.

In its second era (1994-2022) NCB focused on spiritual formation, spiritual direction, and contemplative retreat programs, helping newly promote these historic Christian practices among evangelical Protestants.

In its third era (2022–present), NCB continues to identify with the historic Christian faith and its roots in evangelical Protestantism. It maintains an intercultural and ecumenical outlook and seeks to interpret the Christian gospel in relation to contemporary cultural, political, environmental, and demographic conditions in the San Francisco Bay Area.

== Publication ==
In 2024, NCB acquired Radix Magazine, which began in 1969 as Right On, an underground “street” newspaper published by the Christian World Liberation Front. Renamed Radix in 1976, under the editorship of Sharon Gallagher, the magazine developed into a journal of Christian cultural reflection and analysis, poetry and visual art, with the tagline, “Where Christian faith meets contemporary culture.” Radix continues that vision, now as the official publication of NCB. Its features include a monthly author interview, Radix Live.

== Leadership ==
- W. Ward Gasque (president, 1979-1982)
- David Gill (president, 1986-1989)
- Richard Benner (president, 1990-1993)
- Steven Pattie (president, 1993-1994)
- Susan S. Phillips (executive director, 1994–2022)
- Sharon Gallagher (associate director, 1994-2016)
- Tim Tseng (co-executive director, 2022-2023)
- Craig Wong (co-executive director, 2022-2023; executive director, 2023-present)

== Notable past faculty and lecturers ==
- Bernard Adeney, Christian ethicist and scholar of interfaith relations
- Robert N. Bellah, sociologist
- Patricia Benner, ethicist and scholar of nursing practice
- Joel B. Green, New Testament scholar, Fuller Theological Seminary
- Carl F. H. Henry, theologian and first editor of Christianity Today
- Mark Labberton, former president, Fuller Theological Seminary
- Madeleine L'Engle, writer
- Earl Palmer, pastor and theologian
- John M. Perkins, urban missionary and scholar
- Eugene H. Peterson, pastor, scholar, author, and poet
- Luci Shaw, poet
- John Stott, prominent leader of the Evangelical movement

== Selected present faculty and lecturers ==
- Marilyn McEntyre, NCB visiting professor of Christianity and literature
- Michael Barram, professor of theology and religious studies, St. Mary's College of California
- Robert Chao Romero, professor of Chicana/o and Central American Studies, University of California, Los Angeles
- Rebecca Hernandez, Community Archivist, University of California, Santa Cruz
- Russell Yee, NCB academic director and affiliate professor of worship and culture

== See also ==
- List of evangelical seminaries and theological colleges
