= Delta Kappa Epsilon Fraternity House (Champaign, Illinois) =

- U.S. National Register of Historic Places
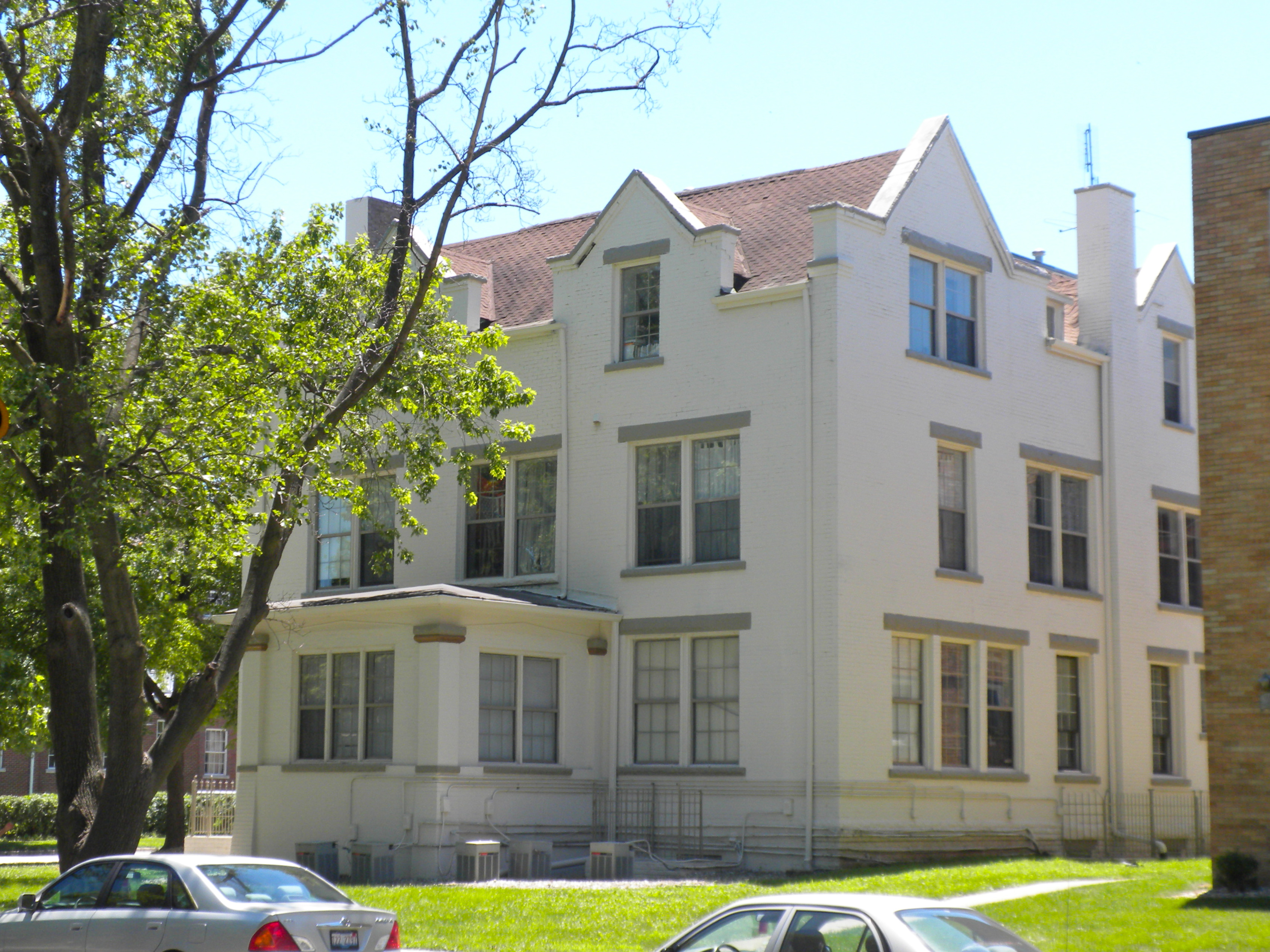

- Location within Illinois Location within the United States
- Location: 313 E. John St., Champaign, Illinois
- Coordinates: 40°06′32″N 88°14′02″W
- Area: less than one acre
- Built: 1906
- Architect: Oldefest, E. G.
- Architectural style: Tudor Revival
- MPS: Fraternity and Sorority Houses at the Urbana--Champaign Campus of the University of Illinois MPS
- NRHP reference No.: 90000114
- Added to NRHP: February 22, 1990

The Delta Kappa Epsilon Fraternity House was a historic fraternity house located at the University of Illinois at Urbana–Champaign in Champaign, Illinois. It was built in 1906 and was used by various fraternities and sororities before being demolished in 2020.

== History ==
The Delta Pi chapter of Delta Kappa Epsilon was chartered at the University of Illinois at Urbana–Champaign on December 17, 1904. Initially, the chapter occupied temporary quarters near campus. Marion F. Tackett, a local real estate developer, convinced the chapter to build its own house.

The Delta Kappa Epsilon chapter house was at 313 East John Street in Champaign in 1906. By September, the fraternity had occupied some of their new house's rooms. Its construction was finished in early November.

Delta Kappa Epsilon occupied the house until 1921 when the Eta chapter of Alpha Sigma Phi fraternity purchased the building. The Eta chapter was chartered in 1908. The Pi chapter of Tau Delta Phi purchased the building in 1929 and occupied the house until 1940. The Pi chapter was chartered in 1924.

In 1941, the former fraternity house became a private dormitory, the Minor House, operated by Mrs. Florence Minor. In 1946, it was called the R & W Club dormitory. In 1947, it was called the Menomee Manor student house. The next year, in 1948, it became the Sherwood Lodge Dormintory, continuing to operate under this name through 1982.

Sigma Sigma Sigma sorority moved into the house in 1983. The chapter house was purchased by Chi Phi fraternity in 1986. The building was added to the National Register of Historic Places as Delta Kappa Epsilon Fraternity House on February 22, 1990.

In 1994, National Real Estate Inc. of Champaign purchased Sherwood Lodge, the former Chi Phi chapter house. it planned to renovate the house "to retain the historic integrity of the area." Plans were to redevelop the fraternity house into ten apartments with a common area, featuring the original fireplace.

After years of being used as student apartments, the building was empty with a condemnation notice in early 2019. The house was part of a group of University of Illinois fraternity and sorority houses that made the Landmarks Illinois "12 Most Endangered Historic Places in Illinois" in May 2019.

It was demolished in 2020 to make way for a new apartment building.

== Architecture ==
Architect E. G. Oldefest, a 1906 member of the chapter, designed the Tudor Revival building. It was built by local developer Marion F. Tackett. It was a 2 1/2 story brick structure with five uneven bays and a gabel roof with shouldered parapets Its casement windows had sandstone sills and lintels. It had a one-story entry porch that covered three of the bays. The porch had a gable roof supported by cambered beams and brick columns with sandstone caps, and a brick balustrade with stone coping. The entry door had a transom and one sidelight.

The first floor had oak woodwork throughout its entry vestibule, an anteroom, dining room, kitchen, an enclosed glass porch, a library, and a living room with massive paneled beams. An oak staircase led to the second floor's nine bedrooms and a bathroom. The third floor had eleven bedrooms and a bathroom. Its basement included a pool room, a laundry room, food storage, and added bedrooms.

== See also ==
- North American fraternity and sorority housing
