= Deke House (Ithaca, New York) =

Historic house in New York, US

- U.S. National Register of Historic Places
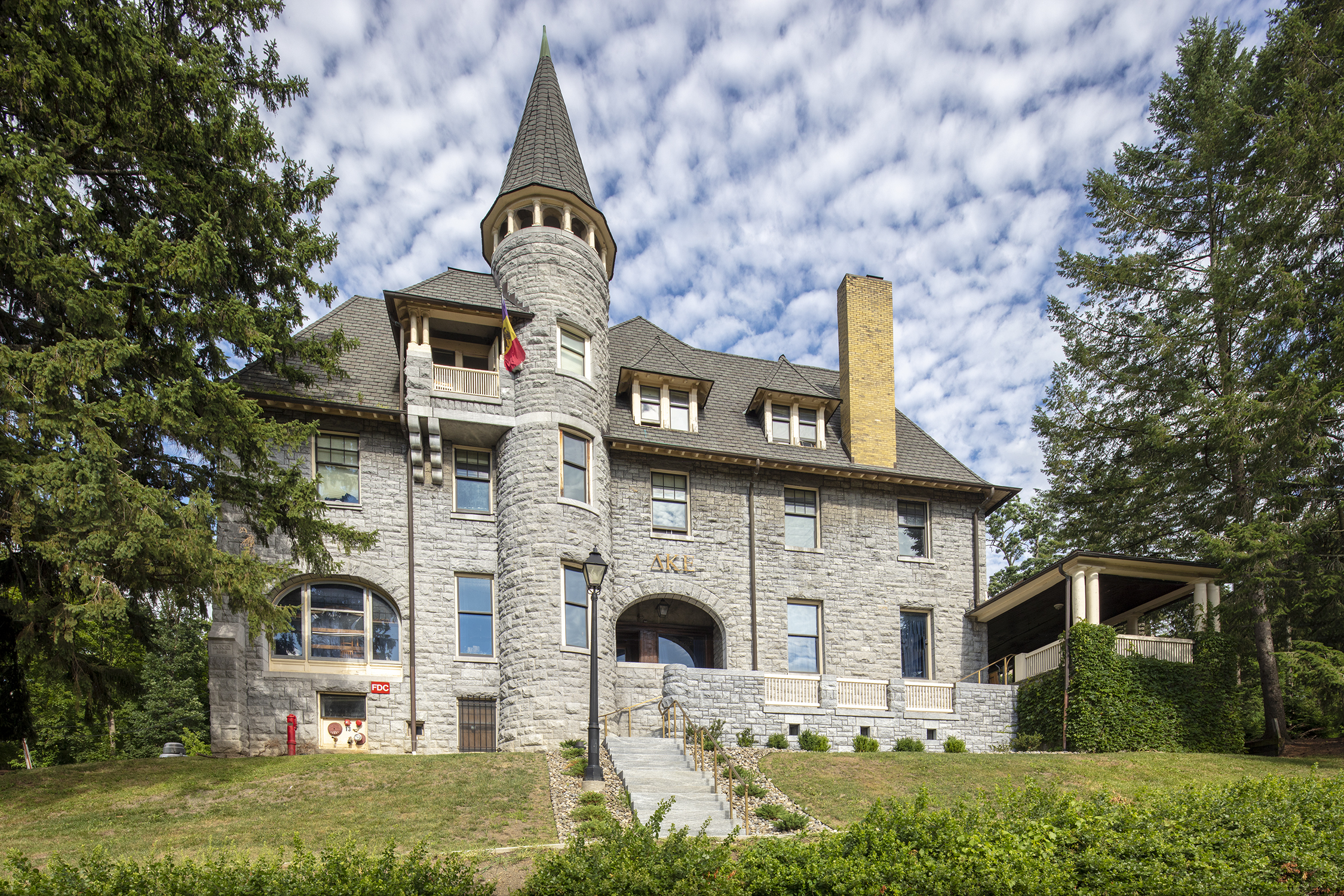
- DKE House front view

- Location within New York Location within the United States
- Location: 13 South Ave. Ithaca, New York
- Coordinates: 42°26′40″N 76°29′16″W
- Area: 0.4 acres (0.16 ha)
- Built: 1893
- Architect: William Henry Miller; Arthur Norman Gibb
- Architectural style: Romanesque, Richardsonian Romanesque
- NRHP reference No.: 90002144
- Added to NRHP: January 11, 1991

Deke House, the Delta Kappa Epsilon or "Deke" House on the campus of Cornell University, was built in 1893 and was listed on the National Register of Historic Places in 1991. It was designed by William Henry Miller to serve as a fraternity house. Two trees which Theodore Roosevelt planted in front of the house are on the National Register of Historic Trees.

It is located at 13 South Avenue in Ithaca, New York.

The original 1893 building was designed to house only 16 students. Three sides of the exterior were clad with marble from the St. Lawrence Marble Company of Gouverneur, New York. It was built on land leased to the fraternity by Cornell University. Except for World War II, it was occupied continuously by the fraternity from September 1894 through May 2014. During World War II, it was occupied by Navy personnel being trained at Cornell. From September 2014, through May 2018, it housed single, male graduate and professional students. In August 2018, the fraternity returned.

In 1900, Miller was retained to design an addition to the original 12 x 15 foot dining room. He enclosed the loggia on the west side of the building to add 500 square feet.

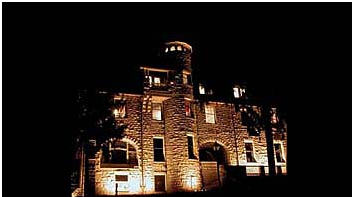
Exterior lighting system

In 1910, the fraternity hired the architectural firm of Gibb and Waltz of Ithaca, New York to design a new addition on the east side of the house. In response to objection of the professor occupying 9 South Avenue, Cornell required that the new east wall of the house not have any windows "except such as may be stationary and glazed with cathedral or prism glass or otherwise so that the interior may be invisible from the outside". This wing brought the house to its present form.

In the 1990s, the south half of the property was converted into a university parking lot. In 1991, the building was added to the national register, and in 2003 the City of Ithaca designated it a Landmark.

== See also ==
- North American fraternity and sorority housing
