= List of Delta Kappa Epsilon chapters =

The Delta Kappa Epsilon fraternity has 56 active chapters and 5 active colonies. It was originally established at Yale University with the Phi chapter in 1844.

Of a total of 56 active chapters, 49 are in the United States, while seven are in Canada – at the University of Toronto, McGill University, the University of British Columbia, the University of Manitoba, the University of Alberta, the University of Victoria, and Simon Fraser University. There are five additional active colonies in North America.

== Naming confusion ==
Delta Kappa Epsilon, as one of the antebellum, or pre-Civil War fraternities, expanded quite early into southern schools that would temporarily, or in some cases permanently, close as a result of the war. Today's standard protocol whereby GLO chapter names were reserved for their schools of origin -- even if the chapters were dormant—had not yet gained traction as a standard rule. Hence, ΔΚΕ's early chapter names were often reassigned. This practice has been discontinued, both by ΔΚΕ and by most other national fraternities. In this table, where a chapter name was used at multiple schools for multiple years, they are listed here, and numbered. Where a name was transitory, the early name(s) are only noted in the reference notes. (Note: As an example of early naming adjustments, Harvard's Alpha chapter name was re-assigned to the chapter at Middlebury. When Harvard's chapter was re-established it took back its name while the Middlebury group was briefly assigned the name Alpha Prime; the Middlebury group was later granted Alpha Alpha to avoid confusion. In another example, the chapter at Lafayette College had been named Omega chapter for just 22 days before it received notice that, instead, it would be designated Rho. This didn't fully settle the matter, as in this case, a dying Indiana University chapter had been the first Rho chapter, thus for the clarity of this table we name Indiana's first (19th Century) iteration as Rho (1), and the Lafayette chapter as ΔΚΕ's Rho (2) chapter. Lafayette's brief iteration as an Omega chapter isn't noted in the main table as it didn't encompass a graduating class.)

== Chapters ==
These are the chapters of Delta Kappa Epsilon in order of establishment. Active chapters and colonies noted in bold, inactive chapters (and inactive schools) noted in italics. Several early chapters reused names of chapters closed during the Civil War, but this practice has been discontinued.

Chapter	Charter date and range	Institution	City	State or province	Status	Ref.
**Phi**	June 22, 1844 – 2010; 2022	Yale University	New Haven	Connecticut	Active	(Note: Yale's fraternities were class-specific in the latter 19th Century. Deke's Phi chapter at Yale was a "Junior Year" society there until March 8, 1887, when it became open to other classes. Generally, though not always, it was the third-year societies where a man lodged his long-term fraternal affiliations; the freshman societies died out, and the sophomore societies likewise were opened to all classes. Deke alumnus Cyrus Northrop is an example of a man of this era who eagerly joined several of these chapters during his undergrad years, as discussed in the article about him.) (Note: ΔΚΕ was banned at Yale from 2010 to 2022 in response to a verbal sexual assault in 2010.)
Theta	November 5, 1844 – 1991	Bowdoin College	Brunswick	Maine	Inactive	(Note: This school was named Waterville College between 1827 until January 23, 1867.) (Note: Fraternities are permanently banned at Amherst, Bowdoin, Colby, and Williams.)
Zeta	September 15, 1845–1846; March 17, 1852 – 1857; 1987–2017	Princeton University	Princeton	New Jersey	Inactive	
Xi	June 25, 1846 – 1984	Colby College	Waterville	Maine	Inactive	
Sigma	November 1, 1846 – 1980; 1986–2015	Amherst College	Amherst	Massachusetts	Inactive	(Note: At its 1986 re-establishment, Sigma chapter absorbed Delta Kappa Sigma (local), a group that had formed in 1980.)
Gamma (1); See also Gamma (2)	April 19, 1847 – 1850; 1855–1861	University of Nashville	Nashville	Tennessee	Moved	(Note: Deke's Gamma chapter had originally been placed at the University of Nashville from 1847, closing in 1861 during the Civil War. That school itself closed in 1909; the Gamma name was moved to nearby Vanderbilt University on October 16, 1889.)
**Psi**	June 20, 1847 – 1859; November 19, 1885	University of Alabama	Tuscaloosa	Alabama	Active	
**Chi**	April 14, 1850 – 1861; 1866–1912; 1927–1979; 1982–1985; 2005–2009; 2022	University of Mississippi	Oxford	Mississippi	Active	
Upsilon	July 25, 1850 – 1963	Brown University	Providence	Rhode Island	Inactive	
**Beta**	April 5, 1851 – 1861; March 19, 1887	University of North Carolina	Chapel Hill	North Carolina	Active	(Note: The UNC group had originally held the name Beta chapter. At its restoration after the Civil War it was rechartered under the name Beta Alpha chapter since Columbia University had by then been chartered with the name Beta in 1874. Later, the UNC group was again granted the Beta chapter name when Columbia chapter's letters were changed to Gamma Beta.)
**Alpha**	November 15, 1851 – 1856; 1860–1891; 1991–1996; 2022 ?	Harvard University	Cambridge	Massachusetts	Colony	(Note: The Middlebury chapter was originally chartered as Alpha chapter; the chapter at Harvard being closed (?) at the time. After Harvard's chapter was revived, the 1857 convention changed the name of ΔΚΕ's Middlebury College chapter to Alpha Prime. In 1887 the chapter name was changed to Alpha Alpha.) (Note: While a period of chapter inactivity is noted between 1856 and 1860, nevertheless the 1900 Catalog continues to show graduating members during that period.) (Note: See The Dickey Club.)
**Delta**	March 8, 1852 – 1861; 2016	University of South Carolina	Columbia	South Carolina	Active	
**Kappa**	March 8, 1852 – 1856; 1859–1873; October 16, 1889 – 1980; 1989–2007; 20xx ?	Miami University	Oxford	Ohio	Active	
**Lambda**	June 5, 1852	Kenyon College	Gambier	Ohio	Active	
Omega	November 15, 1852 – 1861	Oakland College (closed)	Rodney	Mississippi	Inactive	(Note: For a period of less than a month, between October 29, 1855 and November 20, 1855, leaders at the ruling chapter at Yale confirmed that the new chapter at Lafayette College in Easton, PA would be called Omega chapter. This name was rescinded, with a letter in November of that year stating that the Lafayette chapter would carry the name Rho chapter, previously held by a dying chapter at Indiana University. The Lafayette group has maintained the Rho name to the present day. (This table calls this the Rho (2) chapter for clarity) --Name details from HQ convention minutes from that time. In this citation no information was provided about the pre-existing Omega chapter, Oakland College, near Rodney, Mississippi, which reportedly also died in 1861. Did that chapter die out earlier, making the Omega name available? Or was this an oversight? Meanwhile, when a chapter was finally approved for restoration at Indiana, it was given a new name, Delta Phi, also for clarity.)
**Eta**	November 26, 1852 – 1861; 1865	University of Virginia	Charlottesville	Virginia	Active	
Pi	July 14, 1853 – 1970	Dartmouth College	Hanover	New Hampshire	Inactive	
Rho (1); See also **Rho (2)**; See also Delta Psi	November 15, 1853 – May 5, 1855	Indiana University	Bloomington	Indiana	Renamed	(Note: An Indiana chapter was opened, briefly, between November 15, 1853 and May 5, 1855, under a different name designation, Rho (1). Members reported on the "demise of the university (!)", and in response, the Council voted they should return the charter and books, which they did. But a following letter and application was more hopeful, when the 1860 ΔΚΕ convention was presented an application for a new charter by the Indiana University group. This was not acted on, and was finally dismissed two years later in the midst of the Civil War on July 30, 1862. Subsequent applications were received in 1869 and in 1906, but these were also rejected. Finally, when the 2001 application was received, the name Rho chapter was already in long use, so Delta Psi chapter was substituted.) (Note: See Delta Psi chapter)
Iota (1); See also **Iota (2)**	February 23, 1854 – 1861	Kentucky Military Institute	Lyndon	Kentucky	Inactive	(Note: Baird's Archive (a later reference than the print editions) notes that Deke's Iota chapter had been formed at the Kentucky Military Institute in 1854, ceasing operations at the onset of the Civil War. (That school would later emerge as a non-collegiate prep school, itself ceasing operations in 1971 due to financial difficulties.) It operated sub rosa until 1858, and the last of its members left college for enlistment in May 1861. After the Civil War the Iota chapter name was re-assigned to a group called Iota Beta (local) which had its origin in 1882 at Central University of Kentucky, then in Richmond. Interestingly, an earlier group from Centre College of Danville had petitioned as early as October 14, 1854 for a charter in ΔΚΕ, but that matter had been held over for several decades, and abandoned. The Iota Beta (local) at Central University was formed in 1882. ΔΚΕ installed them as the new Iota chapter on June 9, 1885 at Central. Fifteen years later, in 1901, Central University consolidated its faculty and students into Centre College. Separately, in 1906 Central Kentucky's former grounds in Richmond, Kentucky were awarded to the newly established Eastern Kentucky State Normal School No. 1, now ECU.)
Alpha Alpha	September 13, 1854 – 1969; 1985–1991	Middlebury College	Middlebury	Vermont	Inactive	
Omicron	December 16, 1854 – 1971; 1979 – 2023;	University of Michigan	Ann Arbor	Michigan	Inactive	
Epsilon	March 19, 1855 – 1961	Williams College	Williamstown	Massachusetts	Inactive	
**Rho (2)**	October 21, 1855	Lafayette College	Easton	Pennsylvania	Active	
**Tau**	January 15, 1856	Hamilton College	Clinton, Oneida County	New York	Active	
Mu	February 2, 1856 – 2009	Colgate University	Hamilton	New York	Inactive	
Nu	August 22, 1856 – 1973	College of the City of New York	New York City	New York	Inactive	
**Beta Phi**	November 1, 1856	University of Rochester	Rochester	New York	Active	
Theta Chi	November 25, 1856 – 1869; 2004–2019	Union College	Schenectady	New York	Inactive	(Note: At its 2005 reestablishment, Theta Chi chapter absorbed Lambda Beta (local), which had formed in 2001.) (Note: There have been several schools named "Union" hosting fraternities or sororities.)
Kappa Psi	March 16, 1857 – 1862; 1866-1874	Cumberland University	Lebanon	Tennessee	Inactive	
Zeta Zeta (1); See also Zeta Zeta (2)	January 30, 1858 – 1862; 1866–1874	Centenary College of Louisiana	Shreveport	Louisiana	Inactive	(Note: While the chapter was active, Centenary College was located in Jackson, Louisiana. The college was moved to Shreveport in 1908.) (Note: Deke's Zeta Zeta chapter was originally established at Centenary College of Louisiana in 1858, where it lasted until 1861 with the suspension of the school during the Civil War. Nominally, the chapter closed in 1864. It did not re-open with the resumption of classes in 1865. Zeta Zetas chapter name was re-assigned to nearby Louisiana State University in 1923 when the fraternity absorbed The Friars Club, which had originated in 1892 and had petitioned for 14 years to become part of Delta Kappa Epsilon. Chapter records state that the Friars knew of the original Centenary College chapter, learning that all its members died in the Civil War, and from the beginning in 1892 sought to move the original chapter name to LSU. For almost a Century, members were initiated into both Deke and the Friars Club, as sort of an alter-ego fraternity. In recognition of this, brothers of this chapter were allowed to wear both the Delta Kappa Epsilon badge and Friars Club pins. Approximately 100 years later, on January 2019 the LSU chapter was "permanently revoked" by Deke's national office over issues of hazing and a resultant coverup. Concurring with this action, LSU's final closure order and ban until the Fall of 2029 was dated August 15, 2019. As part of the stipulation, the Friars were permanently banned.)
Alpha Delta	June 10, 1858 – 1862	Jefferson College	Canonsburg	Pennsylvania	Inactive	(Note: The Jefferson College chapter closed just prior to the 1865 merger of its school with Washington College.) (Note: Deke at Northwestern University has carried two chapter names. The first chapter originated from the Star & Scroll (local) which had formed in 1947. At installation in 1948 into ΔΚΕ it took the name Delta Epsilon chapter; this group died out in 1959. It was revived briefly in 1970 with the absorption of a group called the Lions (local), re-chartering on November 21, 1970, again as Delta Epsilon chapter. The chapter again went dormant in 1973. In 2000 a third Northwestern group, Chi Delta Chi (local), formed after leaving its previous national in 1992, accepted a ΔΚΕ charter. Baird's Archive, accessed 26 Jun 2022, notes this group took on a previously used name to become the Alpha Delta chapter, coincidentally the name of a chapter that had died out during the Civil War at what was then-called Jefferson College. However the impetus for this name choice came from their origination as the Northwestern chapter of Alpha Delta Phi which had split from that national when it began installing co-ed chapters seven years earlier. Members wished to honor their heritage in some fashion, reflecting the name "Alpha Delt". This third iteration of a Northwestern chapter went dormant in 2001. To complete the record, prior to becoming an ΑΔΦ chapter that group had its origin as the Wranglers Club (local) in 1903. Thus the Wranglers became a chapter of ΑΔΦ, then reverted to a local named Chi Delta Chi, and later became a ΔΚΕ chapter.)
Kappa Phi	March 2, 1860 – 1865	Troy University	Troy	New York	Inactive	(Note: The campus of now-defunct Troy University (New York) was immediately adjacent to Rensselaer Polytechnic Institute. Yet Troy's Kappa Phi chapter closed at least two years prior to the formation of Psi Omega chapter at Rensselaer. There does not seem to be a connection between the two chapters.)
**Phi Chi**	December 15, 1860 – 1985; 1999 ?	Rutgers University	New Brunswick	New Jersey	Active	(Note: The Rutgers chapter was granted on December 15, 1860 by action of the 1860 convention; the members were initiated in a trailing ceremony on February 14, 1861.)
Tau Delta (1); See also **Tau Delta (2)**	December 18, 1860 – 1861	Union University	Jackson	Tennessee	Moved	(Note: This chapter name was reused. Baird's reports a short-lived original chapter at Union University, which ceased in 1862 at the beginning of the Civil War. Early chapter records of the Union group indicate several applications had been rejected in 1855 and 1856, and eventually prevailed on December 18, 1860. Only eleven brothers were initiated when the students left for war. In the post-war period, three schools would amalgamate into a revived Union University, but the Deke chapter there was not revived. The later established chapter at Sewanee originated as Gamma Theta (local) in 1950 and was granted the transferred charter at installation on February 22, 1970. The two schools are about 3.5 hours apart.)
Psi Phi	June 28, 1866 – 1998	DePauw University	Greencastle	Indiana	Inactive	(Note: Until April 5, 1884, DePauw was known as Indiana Asbury University, renamed to honor a benefactor.)
**Gamma Phi**	January 18, 1867	Wesleyan University	Middletown	Connecticut	Active	(Note: Originated as the founding and first Wand chapter of the Mystical Seven in 1837. The Mystical Seven reorganized on that campus in 1889, but its second iteration joined ΒΘΠ the following year.)
Eta Alpha	June 4, 1867 – 1876	Washington and Lee University	Lexington	Virginia	Inactive	
**Psi Omega**	November 14, 1867 – 1965; 2014	Rensselaer Polytechnic Institute	Troy	New York	Active	
Beta Chi	October 9, 1868 – 1971; 1989–2009	Case Western Reserve University	Cleveland	Ohio	Inactive	(Note: This chapter had its origin at Western Reserve in 1941 as the Gamma chapter of Beta Theta Pi, which had formed earlier that year as the Boanergian Society (local). It left ΒΘΠ to join Deke approximately 40 years prior to the formation of the NIC, which would later prohibit "poaching" of chapters among its national fraternities. ΒΘΠ would later re-colonize as that fraternity's Beta (2) chapter, eventually merging with ΒΘΠ's Lambda Kappa chapter at Case University in 1979, after those two schools had merged, and is now called the Lambda Kappa Beta chapter.)
**Delta Chi**	October 16, 1869 – 2013; 2022	Cornell University	Ithaca	New York	Active	
**Delta Delta**	June 11, 1870 – 1885; October 13, 1893 – 1951; 1989	University of Chicago	Chicago	Illinois	Active	(Note: The Chicago chapter had its origin in the Deltas (local), which originated in 1865. Entering ΔΚΕ, they first chartered under the name Delta chapter during the time that the University of South Carolina's chapter was inactive, later taking on the Delta Delta name.)
**Phi Gamma**	October 26, 1871	Syracuse University	Syracuse	New York	Active	(Note: The Syracuse chapter had its origin as the Scroll & Pen chapter of the Mystical Seven, which formed in 1853. It was the first chapter of any fraternity located at Syracuse University.)
Gamma Beta	October 17, 1874 – 1935	Columbia University	New York City	New York	Inactive	(Note: The Columbia chapter had its origin in Psi Phi (local), which formed in 1865. The group was granted the name Beta chapter by ΔΚΕ during the time that the chapter at the University of North Carolina was inactive. Columbia's designation was changed to Gamma Beta at some point after Beta at University of North Carolina was revived.)
**Theta Zeta**	December 8, 1876	University of California, Berkeley	Berkeley	California	Active	(Note: This chapter is active, but operates outside of university or IFC sanction.) (Note: The Berkeley chapter had its origin as the CA Alpha chapter of Phi Delta Theta, established in 1873. It left to join Deke soon thereafter.)
Alpha Chi	November 2, 1878 – 1990	Trinity College	Hartford	Connecticut	Inactive	(Note: The Trinity chapter had its origin as the Clio Society (local), established earlier in 1878.)
Iota (2); See also Iota (1)	June 9, 1885 – 1901	Central University of Kentucky	Richmond	Kentucky	Moved	(Note: Chapter moved to Centre College when the two colleges consolidated in 1901.)
**Iota (3)**; See also Iota (2)	1901–2003, 2012	Centre College	Danville	Kentucky	Active	
Gamma (2); See also Gamma (1)	October 16, 1889 – 2015; April 2019 – February 14, 2021	Vanderbilt University	Nashville	Tennessee	Inactive	
**Phi Epsilon**	October 16, 1889	University of Minnesota	Minneapolis	Minnesota	Active	(Note: The Minnesota chapter had its origin as the MN Alpha chapter of Phi Delta Theta, established on October 12, 1881. It left ΦΔΘ to join Deke prior to or during early 1889. By 1891, ΦΔΘ would re-colonize at the school. All this occurred approximately 20 years prior to the formation of the NIC, which would immediately prohibit "poaching" of chapters among its national fraternities.)
**Sigma Tau**	November 15, 1890	Massachusetts Institute of Technology	Cambridge	Massachusetts	Active	(Note: The MIT chapter originated as Alpha Gamma Kappa (local), in 1888.)
**Alpha Phi**	November 17, 1898	University of Toronto	Toronto	Ontario, Canada	Active	(Note: The Toronto chapter originated as the Caduceus Club (local), prior to 1898.)
Tau Lambda	November 18, 1898 – 1979; 198x ?–2007	Tulane University	New Orleans	Louisiana	Inactive	(Note: The Tulane chapter originated as the Tulane Club (local), prior to 1898.)
**Delta Kappa**	November 16, 1899	University of Pennsylvania	Philadelphia	Pennsylvania	Active	
**Tau Alpha**	November 16, 1900 – 1990; 2000–2003; 2013	McGill University	Montreal	Quebec, Canada	Active	(Note: The McGill chapter originated as Alpha Phi Epsilon (local), in 1899.)
**Sigma Rho**	December 12, 1901	Stanford University	Palo Alto	California	Active	(Note: The Stanford chapter originated as Sigma Rho Eta (local), in 1891.)
**Delta Pi**	November 17, 1904 – 1965; 1969–1972; 1980–1986; 2017	University of Illinois	Champaign	Illinois	Active	(Note: The Illinois chapter originated as the Sphinx Club (local), in 1903.)
Rho Delta	November 15, 1906 – 1947; 1962–1963; 1992–1997	University of Wisconsin	Madison	Wisconsin	Inactive	(Note: The Wisconsin chapter originated as Rho Delta Phi (local), in 1905.)
**Kappa Epsilon**	November 18, 1910 – 1965; 1991–2003; 2021	University of Washington	Seattle	Washington	Active	(Note: The Washington chapter originated as the Druids (local), in 1907.)
**Omega Chi**	December 6, 1912 – 1971; 1976–2008; 2021 ?	University of Texas	Austin	Texas	Colony	(Note: The UT chapter originated as the Capitol Club (local), in 1901.)
Zeta Zeta (2); See also Zeta Zeta (1)	April 7, 1923 – January 2019	Louisiana State University	Baton Rouge	Louisiana	Inactive	
**Alpha Tau**	February 6, 1925 – 2000; 2003	University of Manitoba	Winnipeg	Manitoba, Canada	Active	(Note: The Manitoba chapter originated as Rho Omega Beta (local), prior to 1925.)
Theta Rho	January 26, 1932 – 1952; 1992–2011	University of California, Los Angeles	Los Angeles	California	Inactive	(Note: Period of inactivity between 1952–1992 not explained in 175th Deke Quarterly.)
**Delta Phi**	December 30, 1932	University of Alberta	Edmonton	Alberta, Canada	Active	(Note: The Alberta chapter originated as Phi Alpha (local), in 1929.)
Delta Epsilon; See also Alpha Delta	February 27, 1948 – 1959; November 21, 1970 – 1973	Northwestern University	Evanston	Illinois	Inactive	
Lambda Delta	March 27, 1948 – 1961	Southern Methodist University	University Park	Texas	Inactive	
**Phi Alpha**	December 29, 1948	University of British Columbia	Vancouver	British Columbia, Canada	Active	(Note: The UBC chapter originated as Beta Chi (local), in 1946.)
Kappa Delta	December 23, 1951 – 1960; 1992–1994	University of Maryland	College Park	Maryland	Inactive	(Note: The Maryland chapter originated as Delta Epsilon Kappa (local), in 1948.)
Rho Lambda	February 21, 1954 – 1971; 1990–1995	University of Oklahoma	Norman	Oklahoma	Inactive	(Note: The OK chapter originated as Rho Lambda (local), in 1951.)
**Tau Delta (2)**; See also Tau Delta (1)	November 28, 1968	University of the South	Sewanee	Tennessee	Active	
**Psi Delta**	May 17, 1970	Wake Forest University	Winston-Salem	North Carolina	Active	
**Sigma Alpha**	February 6, 1971	Virginia Tech	Blacksburg	Virginia	Active	(Note: The Virginia Tech chapter originated as Delta Kappa Sigma (local), in 1941.)
**Phi Delta**	June 1, 1972 – 1977; 1989–2004; 2021 ?	University of Western Ontario	London	Ontario, Canada	Colony	(Note: The Western Ontario chapter originated as Phi Delta (local), in 1971.)
**Sigma Phi**	January 23, 1973 – 1993; 2021	Villanova University	Villanova	Pennsylvania	Colony	(Note: The Villanova chapter originated as Sigma Phi Omega (local), in 1969.)
**Pi Beta**	April 8, 1976 – 1986; 2011	Troy University	Troy	Alabama	Active	
Alpha Mu	May 4, 1982 – 2017	Rowan University	Glassboro	New Jersey	Inactive	
**Epsilon Rho**	April 16, 1983	Duke University	Durham	North Carolina	Active	
**Nu Zeta**	April 24, 1983	Pace University	New York City	New York	Active	(Note: The Pace chapter originated as Sigma Zeta Chi (local), in 1966.)
Alpha Omega	April 19, 1984 – 1998	Louisiana Tech University	Ruston	Louisiana	Inactive	
**Theta Upsilon**	March 28, 1985 – 1997; 2010	Arizona State University	Phoenix	Arizona	Active	
Iota Mu	December 1, 1990 – 1995	Fordham University	New York City	New York	Inactive	
Alpha Rho	June 23, 1990 – 1995	Temple University	Philadelphia	Pennsylvania	Inactive	
Zeta Upsilon	January 12, 1991 – 2004	University of California, Davis	Davis	California	Inactive	
**Phi Sigma**	January 18, 1991	Bryant University	Smithfield	Rhode Island	Active	(Note: The Bryant chapter originated as Iota chapter of Phi Sigma Nu (junior fraternity), in 1932.)
**Phi Rho**	February 16, 1991 – 2020; 2024	Pennsylvania State University	University Park	Pennsylvania	Active	
**Chi Rho**	February 16, 1991 – 1998; 20xx ?–2017; 201x ?	Bloomsburg University	Bloomsburg	Pennsylvania	Active	
**Zeta Chi**	April 28, 1991	Bentley University	Waltham	Massachusetts	Active	
**Omega Omega**	January 21, 1992 – 1995; 2022	University of Arizona	Tucson	Arizona	Active	
Sigma Beta	February 22, 1993 – 1997	University of California, Santa Barbara	Santa Barbara	California	Inactive	
**Beta Gamma**	June 12, 1994	New York University	New York City	New York	Active	
**Beta Delta**	February 26, 1995 – 1996; June 22, 2019	University of Georgia	Athens	Georgia	Active	(Note: This chapter had its origin as a chapter of Sigma Phi Epsilon in 1961. It left that national fraternity in ~1994 prior to joining ΔΚΕ.)
Alpha Beta	May 20, 1997 – 2003	DePaul University	Chicago	Illinois	Inactive	(Note: The DePaul chapter originated as Alpha Beta Gamma (local), in 1946.)
**Sigma Kappa**	April 18, 1998	Michigan State University	East Lansing	Michigan	Active	(Note: The Michigan State chapter originated as Kappa Epsilon Gamma (local), prior to 1998.)
**Delta Tau**	April 29, 1999 – 2001; 2021	Ohio State University	Columbus	Ohio	Active	
Alpha Delta; See also Delta Epsilon	July 6, 2000 – 2001	Northwestern University	Evanston	Illinois	Inactive	
**Mu Chi**	February 23, 2001	Maryville College	Maryville	Tennessee	Active	
Upsilon Omega	March 20, 2001 – 2003	University of South Alabama	Mobile	Alabama	Inactive	
**Delta Psi**; See also Rho (1)	July 6, 2000 – 2019; 2022	Indiana University	Bloomington	Indiana	Active	(Note: An appeal was lodged with the DKE board on "inactivity" in 2019. This appears to have been unsuccessful. The chapter is no longer listed on the national website nor among the campus Greeks as of 13 July 2022.)
**Rho Beta**	October 11, 2001	University of Richmond	Richmond	Virginia	Active	
Phi Beta	January 14, 2002 – 2007	Stephen F. Austin State University	Nacogdoches	Texas	Inactive	
Kappa Omega	April 29, 2002 – 2007	Lake Forest College	Lake Forest	Illinois	Inactive	
**Alpha Gamma**	2002–2007, 2022	United States Military Academy	West Point	New York	Active	
Tau Chi	March 4, 2010-2023	Texas A&M University	College Station	Texas	Inactive	
**Beta Tau**	March 27, 2010	University of Victoria	Oak Bay	British Columbia, Canada	Active	
**Omega Mu**	April 12, 2012 – 2019; 2022	Oklahoma State University	Stillwater	Oklahoma	Colony	
**Sigma Xi**	July 28, 2012	St. Joseph's University	Brooklyn	New York	Active	(Note: The St. Joseph chapter originated as Sigma Xi Epsilon (local), in 2004.)
**Delta Alpha**	November 7, 2012 – 2015; 2022	Auburn University	Auburn	Alabama	Active	(Note: Delta Alpha chapter at Auburn originated as a ΔΚΕ colony earlier in 2012.)
**Gamma Iota**	May 7, 2014 – 2023	Gannon University	Erie	Pennsylvania	Inactive	(Note: Gamma Iota chapter at Gannon originated as a ΔΚΕ colony in 2013.)
**Phi Mu**	May 15, 2014	Manhattan University	The Bronx	New York	Active	(Note: Phi Mu chapter at Manhattan University originated as a ΔΚΕ colony in 2012.)
**Chi Beta**	May 19, 2014	University of North Carolina Wilmington	Wilmington	North Carolina	Active	(Note: Chi Beta chapter at UNCW originated as a ΔΚΕ colony in 2012.)
**Zeta Gamma**	August 7, 2015	Hampden–Sydney College	Hampden Sydney	Virginia	Active	(Note: Zeta Gamma chapter at Hampton–Sydney originated as a ΔΚΕ colony in 2013.)
**Pi Alpha**	July 30, 2016	University of Missouri	Columbia	Missouri	Active	(Note: Pi Alpha chapter at Mizzou originated as a ΔΚΕ colony in 2015.)
**Kappa Chi**	October 15, 2017 – 2018	University of Delaware	Newark	Delaware	Colony	(Note: Kappa Chi chapter at Delaware originated as a ΔΚΕ colony in 2013.) (Note: Kappa Chi chapter was suspended until 2023. Hazing Violation.)
**Lambda Tau**	2014	University of Tennessee	Knoxville	Tennessee	Active	
**Iota Chi**	2014	Ithaca College	Ithaca	New York	Active	
**Kappa Beta**	2018	University of Illinois Springfield	Springfield	Illinois	Colony	
**Tau Beta**	2019	Simon Fraser University	Burnaby	British Columbia, Canada	Active	(Note: Tau Beta chapter at Simon Fraser originated as a ΔΚΕ colony in 2013.)
**Alpha Omicron**	2021	University of Colorado Boulder	Boulder	Colorado	Active	(Note: Alpha Omicron chapter at Boulder originated as a ΔΚΕ colony in 2015.)
**Delta Rho**	2019	North Carolina State University	Raleigh	North Carolina	Active	(Note: Delta Rho chapter at NCSU originated as a ΔΚΕ colony in 2012.)
**Nu Alpha**	2021	Northeastern University	Boston	Massachusetts	Active	(Note: Nu Alpha chapter at Northeastern originated as a ΔΚΕ colony in 2019.)
**Alpha Epsilon**	2022 ?	Georgetown University	Washington	District of Columbia	Colony	
**Tau Gamma**	2022	Texas Tech University	Lubbock	Texas	Active	
