= Cornell Chronicle =

Weekly newspaper published by Cornell University

The Cornell Chronicle is the in-house weekly newspaper published by Cornell University.

== History ==
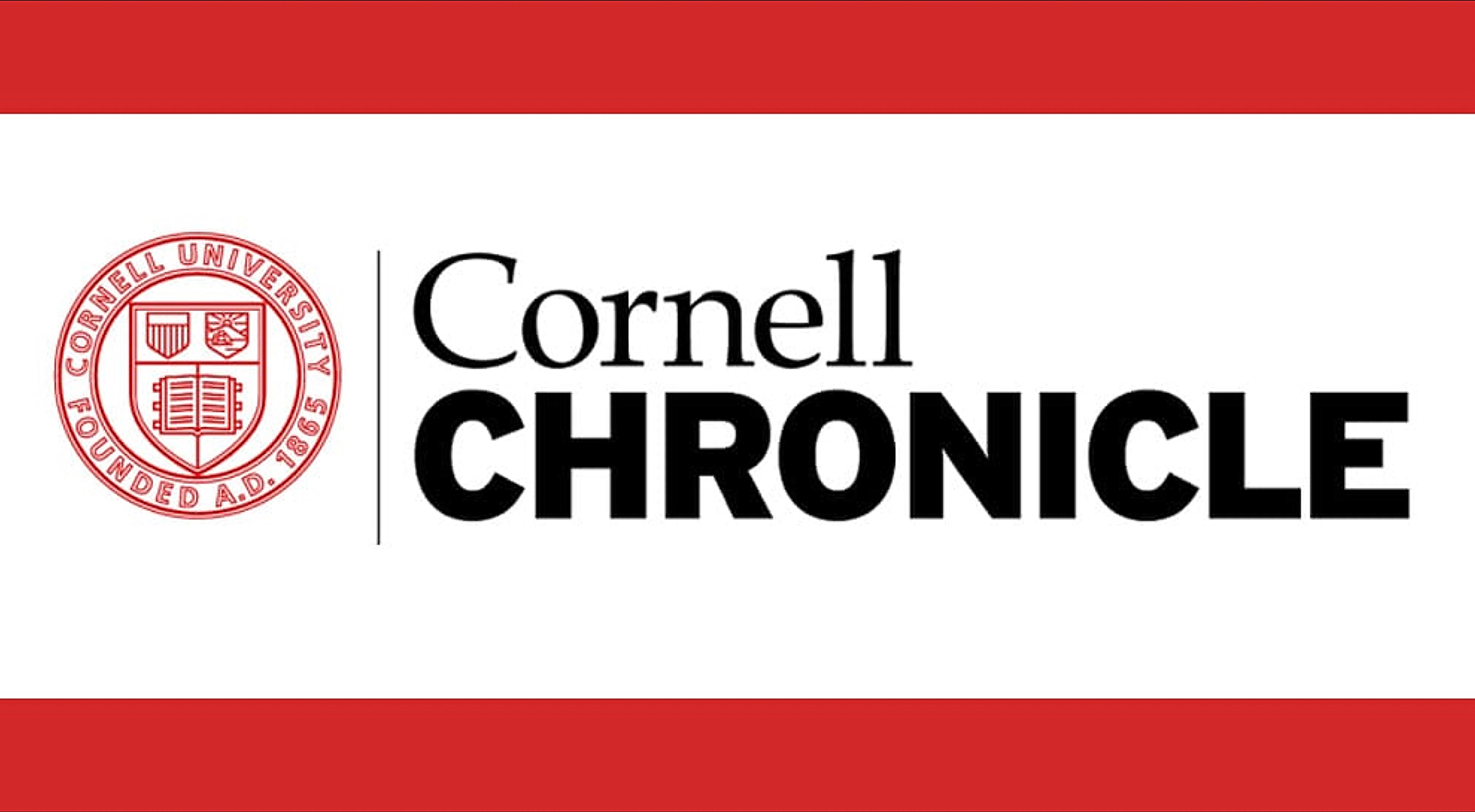
Cornell Chronicle, Logo (2020)

Prior to the founding of the Chronicle in 1969, campus news was reported by the Cornell Era and then by The Cornell Daily Sun. During the Willard Straight Hall takeover in April 1969 , the campus learned of unfolding events through the student-edited Sun, the student radio station WVBR, and the independently owned Cornell Alumni News. However, Cornell's administration, most notably then-Vice President for Public Affairs Steven Muller, was dissatisfied because those media reported events in a manner that was somewhat critical of the administration. Over the summer, plans for the Chronicle were put in place and it debuted on September 25, 1969. The Chronicle's first office was in the basement of the Edmund Ezra Day Hall administration building, and Kal Lindenburg, a Sun alumnus, was hired as its first Managing Editor. It was printed every Wednesday during the school year as a newsprint broadside on the presses of the Ithaca Journal.

The early issues are filled with university press releases, as well as pages generated by the Dean of the Faculty, University Senate and various employee groups. The Chronicle would also print the full text of various University reports. However, the Chronicle was careful to reflect the administration's perspective on the news. For example, in 1970, when the Board of Trustees considered an important proposal to restructure its membership and to establish a University Senate, the Chronicle headline stated "Cornell Trustees Approve the Formation of Senate", while the Sun headline read, "Committee Delays Senate Election After Trustees Modify Constitution".

From its start, the Chronicle was available for free at locations throughout Cornell's campus, and subsequently paid mail subscriptions were sold to off-campus readers. Subsequently, the Cornell News Service and the Chronicle relocated off campus to offices in downtown Ithaca, New York. The issues are currently formatted for 8.5" by 11" pages, and can be purchased printed on 11" by 17" paper, folded.

== Purpose ==
The first issue of the Chronicle featured a "Statement of Purpose", which stated in part:

The purpose of the Chronicle is to provide official information, important to its readers as members of the University, but not readily available through existing communications channels.

Each issue of the Chronicle will include at least one page devoted to the activities of the University faculty. Responsibility for the contents of the faculty section has been delegated to the Secretary of the Faculty.

The Chronicle is not intended to compete with local communications media reporting on University activities. It is intended to supplement their efforts by providing more comprehensive information than the media can devote to University matters due to limitations of space and time.

== Archives ==
Archives of the Chronicle are available from 1969, which are scanned from bound volumes and available in PDF form in the university's online repository, eCommons, with post 1996 issues available on the Cornell website.
