= Greenwood School (West Whiteland, Pennsylvania) =

- U.S. National Register of Historic Places
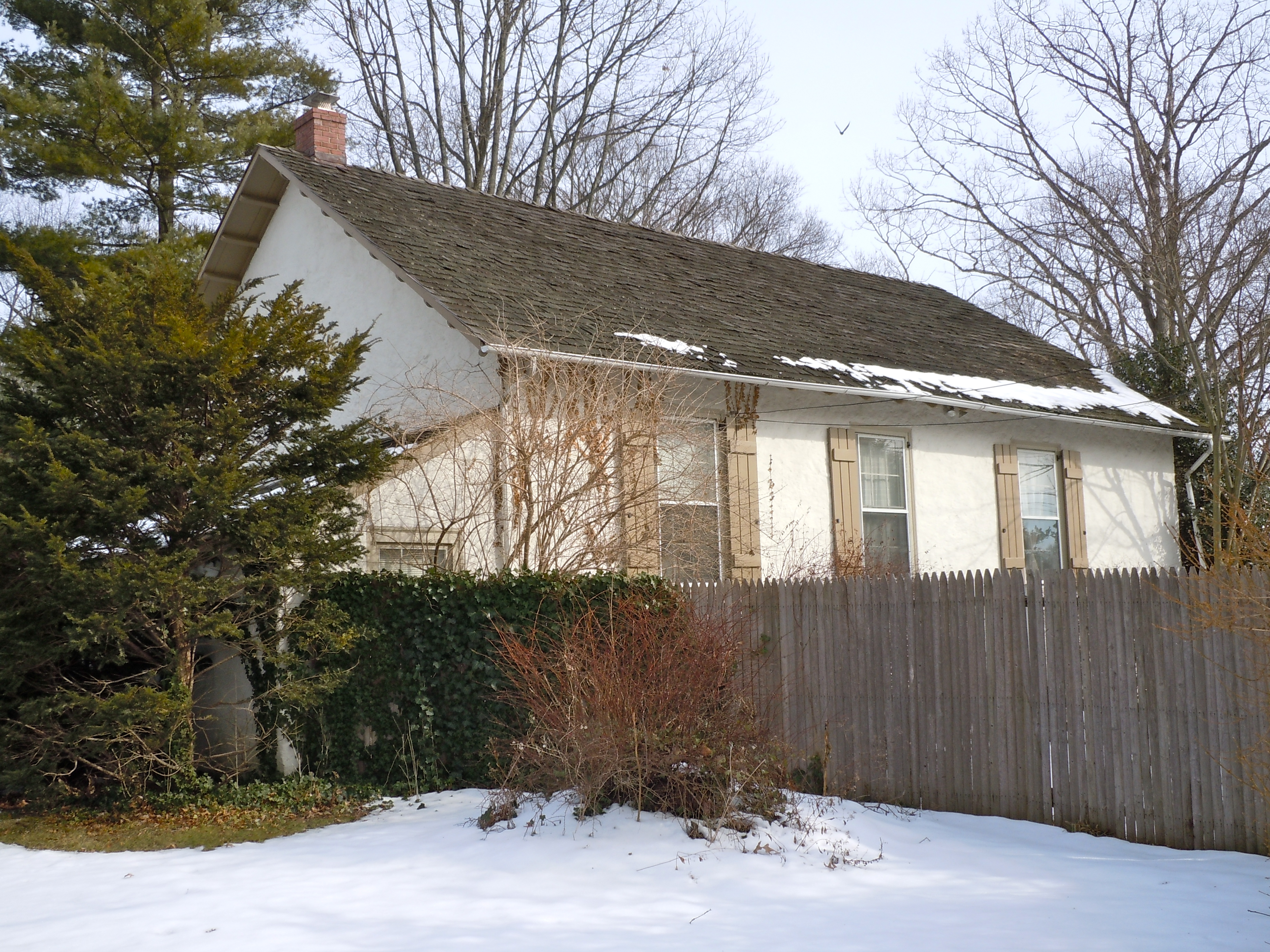
- Greenwood School, January 2011

- Location within Pennsylvania Location within the United States
- Location: 700 King Rd., West Whiteland Township, Pennsylvania
- Coordinates: 40°0′50″N 75°36′0″W
- Area: less than one acre
- Built: 1872
- Architectural style: Rural Gothic
- MPS: West Whiteland Township MRA
- NRHP reference No.: 83004208
- Added to NRHP: November 10, 1983

The Greenwood School is an historic, one-room school building which is located in West Whiteland Township, Chester County, Pennsylvania.

It was listed on the National Register of Historic Places in 1983.

== History and architectural features ==
Built in 1872, the Greenwood School is a one-and-one-half-story, stuccoed, stone structure with a gable roof. It was used as a school until 1941, after which it was converted to a residence.
