= Christian study center =

Christian study centers are American Christian organizations located close to universities and colleges. Beginning in 1968, they have been developed to encourage the life of the mind and a thoughtful approach to all academic disciplines from an orthodox Christian perspective. One long-term goal of many study centers is to maintain a physical presence close to a university campus, not unlike Hillel: The Foundation for Jewish Campus Life. Many of these college religious organizations are affiliated with the Consortium of Christian Study Centers, which was founded in 2008.

== History ==
Christian study centers began appearing on U.S. university campuses in the late 1960s and early 1970s. Their founders and staff encouraged students, faculty, and local residents to integrate the life of the university—scholarship, science, and art—with the Christian faith, rather than to see faith and learning as competing or mutually exclusive. The 1994 publication of The Scandal of the Evangelical Mind, by evangelical historian Mark Noll, spurred much reflection among evangelical Christians about the anti-intellectualism of many strands of their culture. The study center movement gained momentum in the ensuing years, with centers multiplying across the United States. As historian Molly Worthen has written in the New York Times, "The centers position themselves as forums where students can hash out the tensions between their faith and the assumptions of secular academia—the same assumptions that has assailed more traditional ministries.

In 1968 the first of these Christian study centers, the Center for Christian Study, was founded in Charlottesville, Virginia, next to the University of Virginia. The center took its initial inspiration from a combination of two organizations, Francis Schaeffer's L'Abri and Regent College, a graduate school of biblical and theological studies for laypeople. The Center for Christian Study was fully incorporated in 1976.

In 1972 Frank C. Nelsen, a former professor at the University of Wisconsin–Milwaukee, discussed creating evangelical living and learning centers for students in an article in Christianity Today. He said that centers "for undergraduate students [should] be built on private property near large state universities" to enable students to engage in "intellectually honest investigation of the Christian faith."

Soon after, several Christian study centers were founded at almost the same time, such as New College Berkeley in 1977 and the MacLaurin Institute in St. Paul, Minnesota, which began in 1982. MacLaurin merged with Christian Student Fellowship to become MacLaurinCSF in 2011 and was renamed Anselm House in 2015. In 2022, Anselm House opened its rewly remodeled Minneapolis location on the East Bank of the University of Minnesota - called Melrose Station.

In 1983 the Dayspring Center for Christian Studies began near the University of Colorado in Boulder, Colorado. It offered courses that were approved for transfer to the University. Originally it was an extension site for Denver Seminary. In 2004 the center entered into a partnership with Northwestern College and opened two more study centers at Colorado universities with transfer credit arrangements. Dayspring later changed its name to The Boulder Center for Christian Study, which is affiliated with Centers for Christian Study International (CCSI), an organization dedicated to starting Study Centers in university towns.

In 2000 Chesterton House began at Cornell University in Ithaca, New York. It grew out of the new interest in Christian evangelical intellectual activity in the 1990s, which included The Scandal of the Evangelical Mind by Mark A. Noll in 1995 and The Outrageous Idea of Christian Scholarship by George Marsden in 1998.

In 2013 the Lilly Endowment awarded $2.9 million to 21 university campus ministry organizations to expand their programs related to vocation. Four of these were members of the CCSC: Chesterton House at Cornell University, the Christian Study Center of Gainesville at the University of Florida, Hill House Ministries at the University of Texas, and University Christian Ministries (now the Center for Christian Study) at the University of Virginia. In 2014 the Oread Center in Lawrence, Kansas, also a Member Organization of the Consortium of Christian Study Centers, received part of a $4 million grant.

After a Supreme Court ruling in 2010, many schools began enforcing non-discrimination policies for all campus organizations. Student religious groups were asked to sign a non-discrimination policy that required any member of the school to be able to join and become a leader of the group, or lose funding and access to meeting space. In 2014 the Bowdoin Christian Fellowship, affiliated with the InterVarsity Christian Fellowship left the Bowdoin College campus. It became the Joseph and Alice McKeen Study Center near the college.

== Programs ==
Christian study centers were founded in part to model and engage in serious university study of all academic disciplines from an orthodox Christian perspective. Traditional campus ministries tend to focus on building a network of students to engage in regular religious worship and social activities for their membership. In contrast to ministry models built on student membership and regular worship, Study Centers lead students to take their studies seriously as preparation for their chosen vocation and to incorporate Christian scholarship within academic life. They typically offer libraries, guest lectures, classes, and seminars. Some offer an array of events open to university communities, including film showings and Bible studies. Others have residential programs for students. Courses offered at some centers are affiliated with religious colleges whose credits can transfer to the institutions their students attend.

== Consortium of Christian Study Centers ==
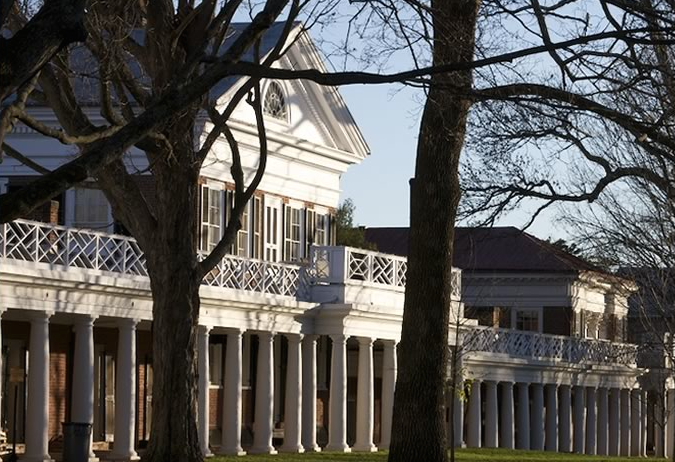
The Consortium of Christian Study Centers (CCSC) is located in Charlottesville, VA, home of the University of Virginia, where the first study center, the Center for Christian Study, began in 1968.

The Consortium of Christian Study Centers (CCSC) was formed in 2008 with the goal of promoting, encouraging, and providing resources for Christian Study Centers. Beginning in 1999 several heads of Christian study centers began meeting to discuss the present state and future of the Study Center movement. The group grew, and in 2008 formed the Consortium of Christian Study Centers (CCSC) in Charlottesville, Virginia. They elected Dr. Andrew Trotter as the Executive Director. In April 2009, CCSC began functioning as a freestanding, non-profit organization and received 501(c)(3) status in July of that year. It held its first annual meeting in November 2011. In January 2021, Dr. Karl E. Johnson, former director of Chesterton House, became the Consortium’s second Executive Director.

The consortium is supported by donations and by dues paid by its members and partner organizations. It sponsors an annual meeting, provides numerous resources for thoughtful study, helps its member organizations find speakers and recruit staff, provides advice, and encourages communication among the groups. Member centers are non-profit and non-denominational. The CCSC avoids theological controversies such as biblical inerrancy by requiring of its member Study Centers only that they agree with the Apostles' Creed.

As of 2022, the CCSC has more than 30 study centers as members and more than 30 partner organizations.

== See also ==
- Christian Union (students)
- Cru (Christian organization)
- InterVarsity Christian Fellowship
- Newman Center
- Wesley Foundation
