= Delta Kappa Epsilon =

North American collegiate fraternity

- ΔΚΕ
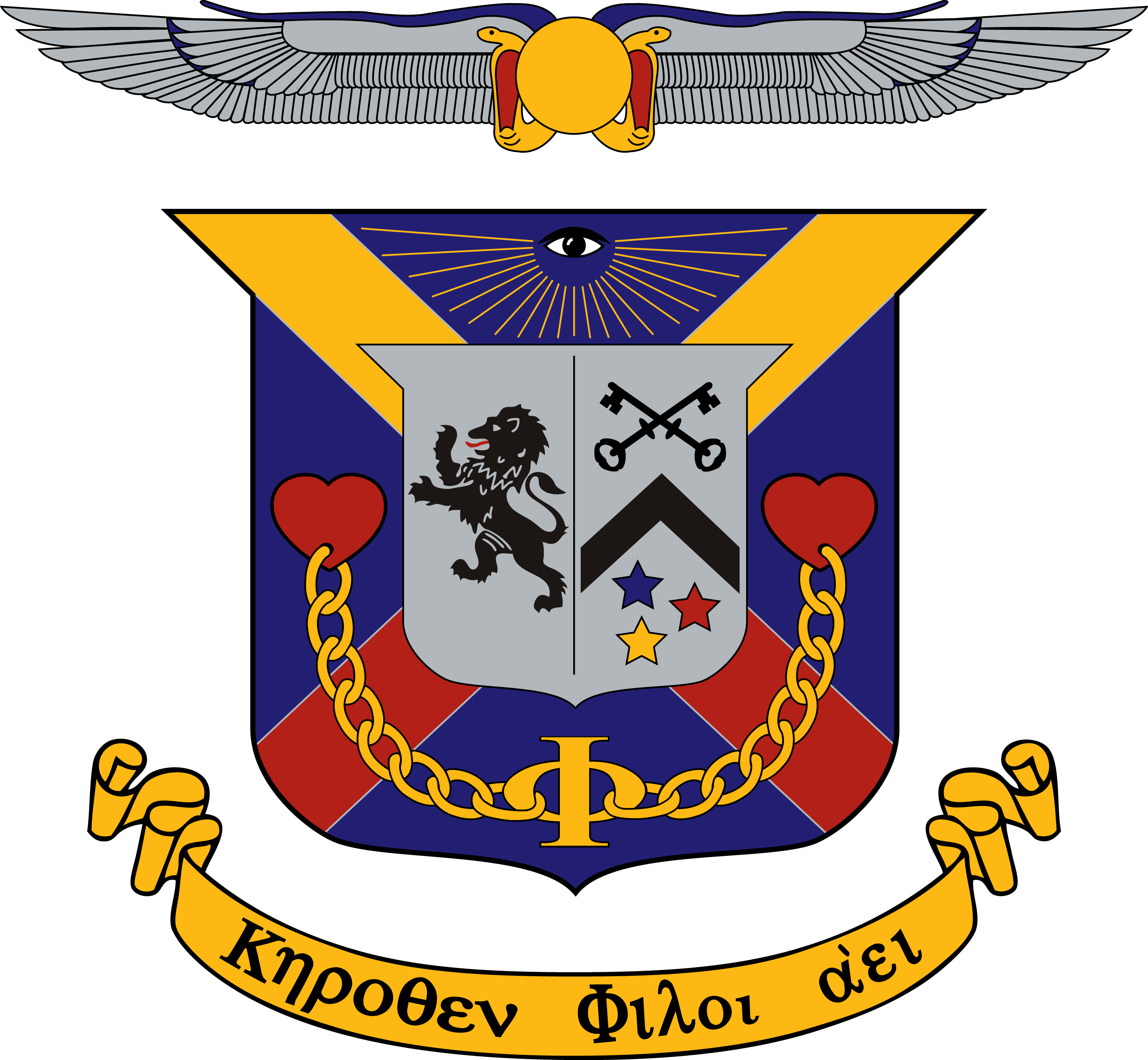
- Founded: June 22, 1844; 182 years ago Yale University
- Type: Social
- Affiliation: NIC
- Status: Active
- Scope: North America
- Motto: Κηροθεν Φιλοι ἀει Kērothen Philoi Aei "Friends From The Heart, Forever"
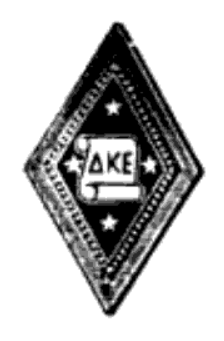
- Member badge
- Colors: Azure (Blue/Navy); Or (Gold); Gules (Crimson)
- Symbol: Rampant Lion
- Flag
- Publication: The Deke Quarterly
- Philanthropy: Rampant Lion Foundation
- Chapters: 56
- Colonies: 5
- Nicknames: DKE, Deke
- Headquarters: P.O. Box 8360 --or-- 6921 Jackson Rd., Suite 400; Ann Arbor, Michigan 48103; United States
- Website: dke.org

Delta Kappa Epsilon (ΔΚΕ), commonly known as DKE or Deke, is one of the oldest fraternities in the United States, with fifty-six active chapters and five active colonies across North America. It was founded at Yale College in 1844 by fifteen sophomores who were discontented with the existing fraternity order on campus. The men established a fellowship where the candidate most favored was "he who combined in the most equal proportions the Gentleman, the Scholar, and the Jolly Good Fellow."

== History ==
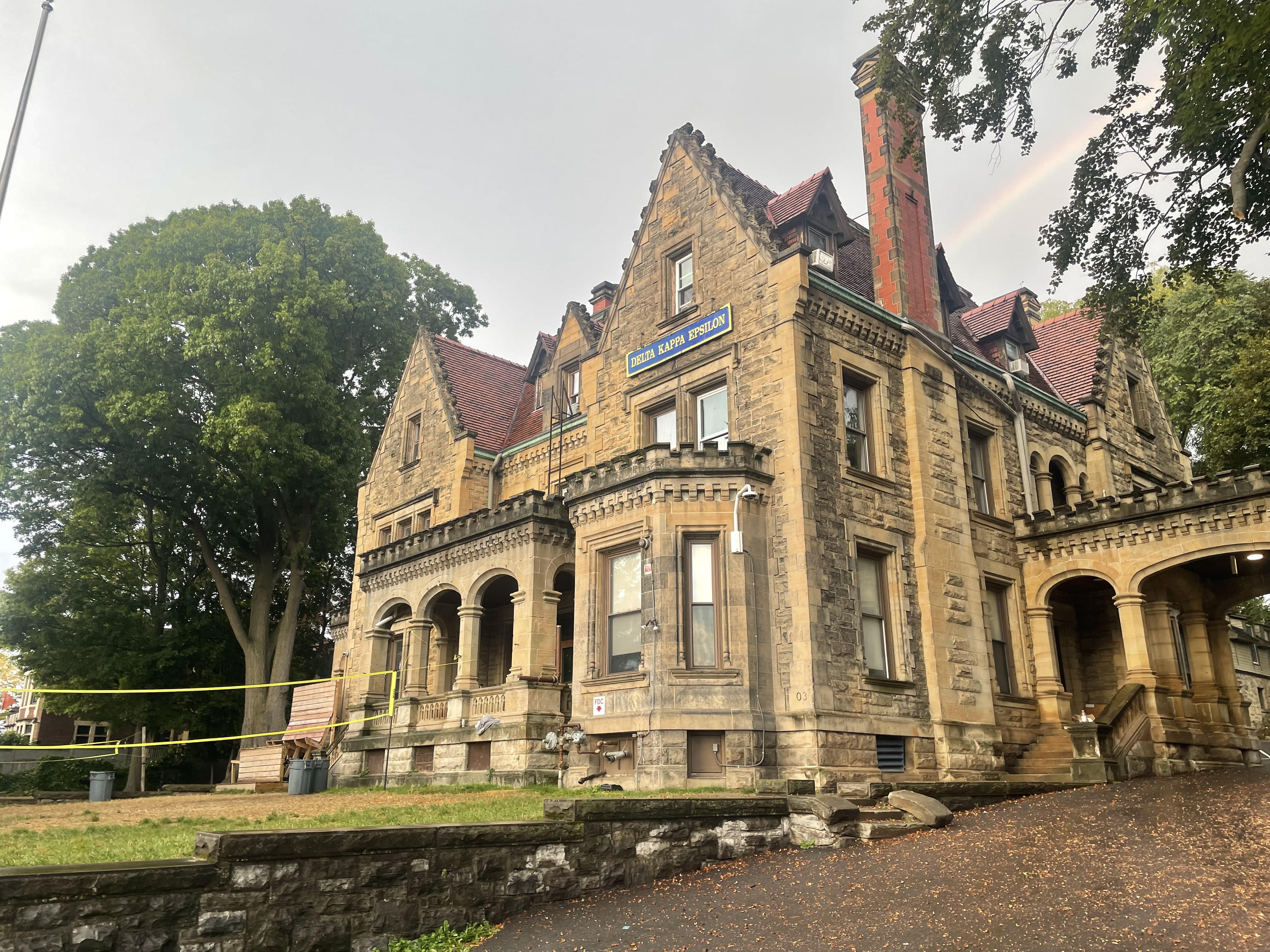
The Delta Kappa Epsilon house at Syracuse University in Syracuse, New York

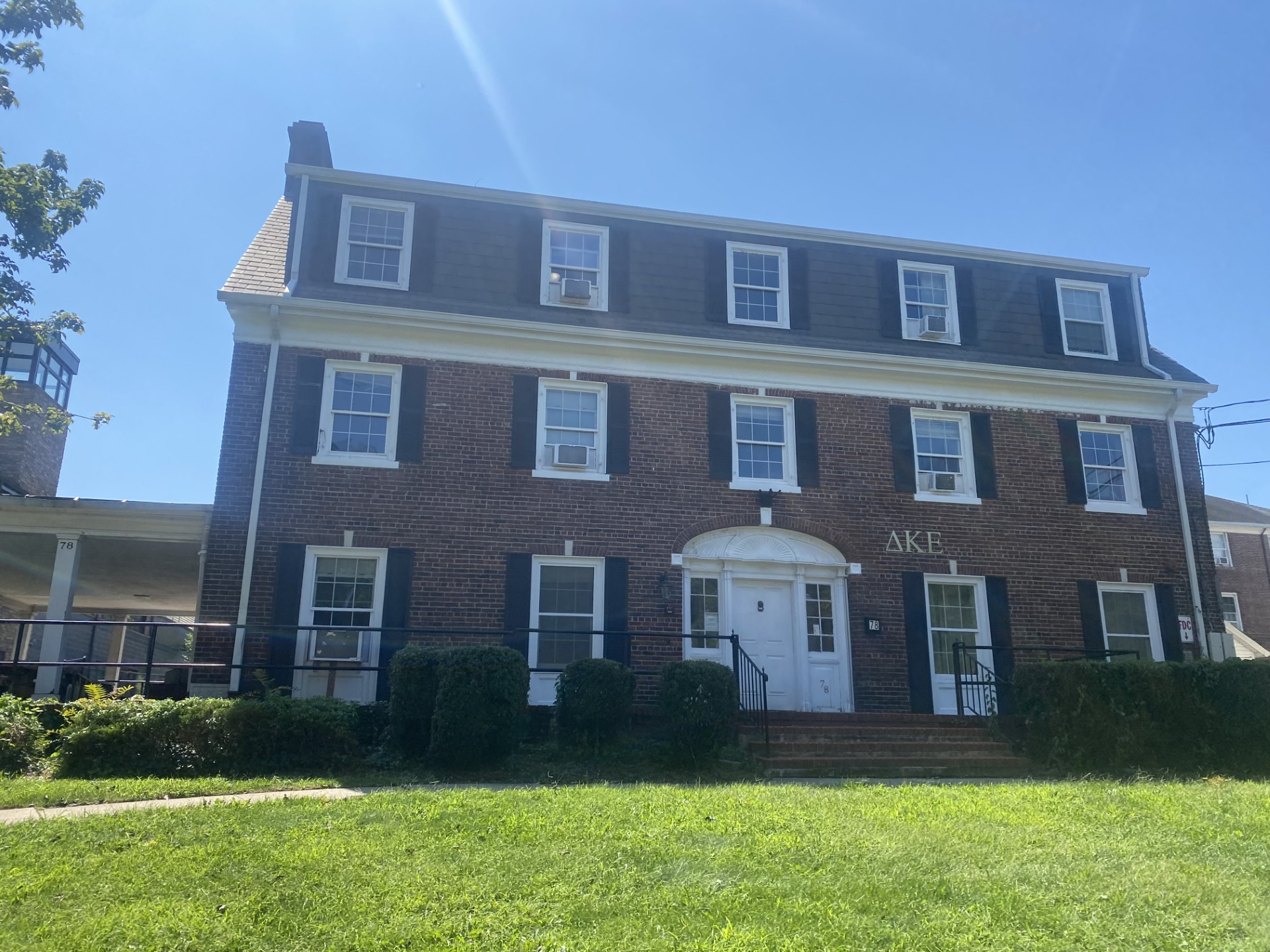
The Delta Kappa Epsilon house at Rutgers University in New Brunswick, New Jersey

Delta Kappa Epsilon was founded on June 22, 1844, in room number twelve in the corner of Old South Hall on the campus of Yale College in New Haven, Connecticut. Its fifteen founders were:

- William Woodruff Atwater
- Edward Griffin Bartlett
- Frederic Peter Bellinger Jr.
- Henry Case
- George Foote Chester
- John Butler Conyngham
- Thomas Isaac Franklin
- William Walter Horton
- William Boyd Jacobs
- Edward VanSchoonhoven Kinsley
- Chester Newell Righter
- Elisha Bacon Shapleigh
- Thomas DuBois Sherwood
- Albert Everett Stetson
- Orson William Stow

At this meeting, the Fraternity's secret and open Greek mottos were devised, as were the lapel pin design and secret grip. The open motto became – "Kerothen Philoi Aei" – "Friends From The Heart, Forever."

Central to the values of Delta Kappa Epsilon are its objects:

The objects of Delta Kappa Epsilon are the cultivation of general literature and social culture, the advancement and encouragement of intellectual excellence, the promotion of honorable friendship and useful citizenship, the development of a spirit of tolerance and respect for the rights and views of others, the maintenance of gentlemanly dignity, self-respect, and morality in all circumstances, and the union of stout hearts and kindred interests to secure to merit its due reward.

Within five years of the founding of Phi chapter at Yale, chapters were installed at Bowdoin College, Princeton University, Colby College, Amherst College, University of Nashville, and the University of Alabama.

Despite traditionally selecting and installing ΔΚΕ chapters along the Eastern Seaboard, ΔΚΕ holds a strong reputation as a Southern fraternity. Between 1845 and 1846, thirteen of the 38 of the active members of the Phi chapter at Yale were Southerners. While Vanderbilt University was not founded until 1873, the Gamma chapter of ΔΚΕ was founded in Nashville 25 years earlier, in 1847. Also that year, the Psi chapter at University of Alabama and then Chi chapter at Mississippi would firmly root Delta Kappa Epsilon as an institution steeped in southern heritage.

Delta Kappa Epsilon's first West Coast chapter was founded at the University of California, Berkeley on Halloween night, 1876. The Mu chapter at Colgate University in Hamilton, New York, is one of the few with a Temple, open only to DKE member initiates of the Mu chapter. The Lambda chapter at Kenyon College built the first fraternity lodge in 1854. Delta Kappa Epsilon became an international fraternity with the addition of the Alpha Phi chapter in 1898 at the University of Toronto, Canada. Expansion to the United Kingdom had little success. Today, ΔΚΕ chapters are located only in the United States and Canada. The fraternity's first convention was held in New Haven, Connecticut on December 23, 1946.

== Symbols ==
The ΔΚΕ Flag consists of three bands of color: Azure (blue, truth), Or (gold, fidelity), and Gules (crimson, courage) with a dexter rampant lion in the middle band. ΔΚΕ flags have been carried to the North Pole by its discoverer, Admiral Robert Peary, and to the Moon by astronaut Alan Bean. Adorning the active pin are the Greek letters Δ Κ Ε etched downward, diagonally across an ivory scroll and centered atop an onyx diamond, encased in rope-textured gold trim and stars gracing each of the four corners. Active members' initials for their given name and number as initiated in the chapter complete the active pin. Delta Kappa Epsilon pledges wear a triangle-shaped lapel pin with the same heraldic colors of Azure, Champagne & Crimson, with red facing upward & always on collared shirts.

== Activities ==
Community service is a major focus for each chapter of ΔΚΕ, in addition to the social aspect that integrates collegiate academics with Greek system of fraternities and sororities. Chapters compete and are awarded equally on merits of leadership, chapter improvement and community service. The Lion Trophy is awarded each year to the chapter with most notable achievements in each category.

== Chapters ==
ΔΚΕ has grown to fifty-six chapters and has initiated over 85,000 members across North America.

== Delta Kappa Epsilon Club of New York ==
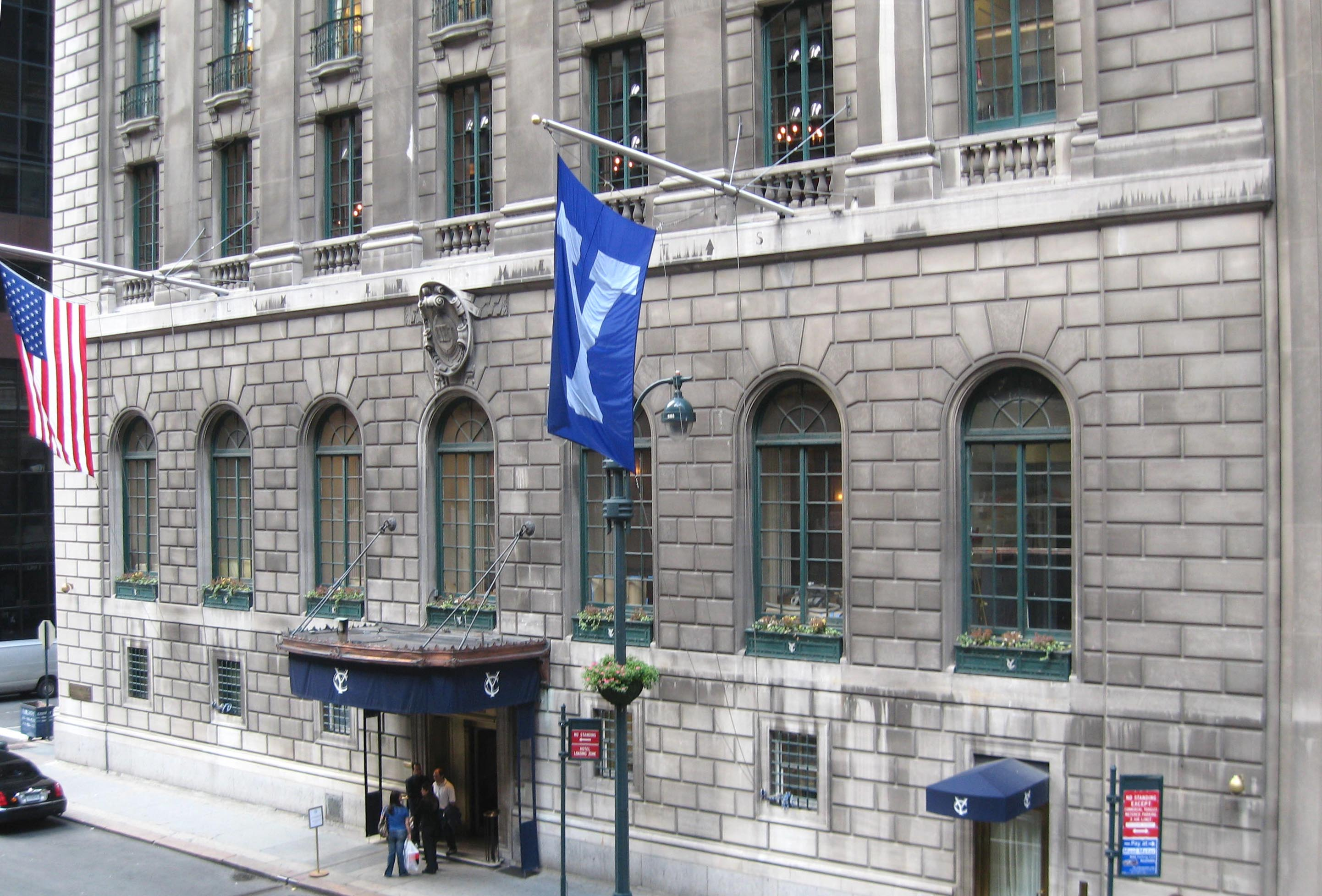
The Yale Club of New York City's main entrance on Vanderbilt Avenue in Midtown Manhattan, home of the Delta Kappa Epsilon Club of New York

Members of Delta Kappa Epsilon who have completed their undergraduate education are eligible for membership in The Delta Kappa Epsilon Club of New York. The DKE Club was founded on May 9, 1885, occupying several clubhouses in Midtown Manhattan, including 30 West 44th Street which it purchased from The Yale Club of New York City in 1916. After renovations totaling $75,000, the clubhouse opened in January 1917. However, just nine years later the Club relocated again when it sold the building to the Army and Navy Club of New York.

Partially due to the Great Depression, in 1932, the DKE Club entered into an affiliation with the Yale Club of New York whereby members would have the same access to its clubhouse and facilities as the 11,000 members of the Yale Club itself. Designed by James Gamble Rogers, the clubhouse is located at 50 Vanderbilt Avenue across from Grand Central Terminal. Upon opening its doors in 1915, the building became the largest clubhouse in the world and continues to be the largest college clubhouse in existence today.

The club has often hosted dinners and other events for notable alumni members of the fraternity such as polar explorer Robert Peary (who took a Deke flag to the North Pole with him in 1909).

== Notable members ==
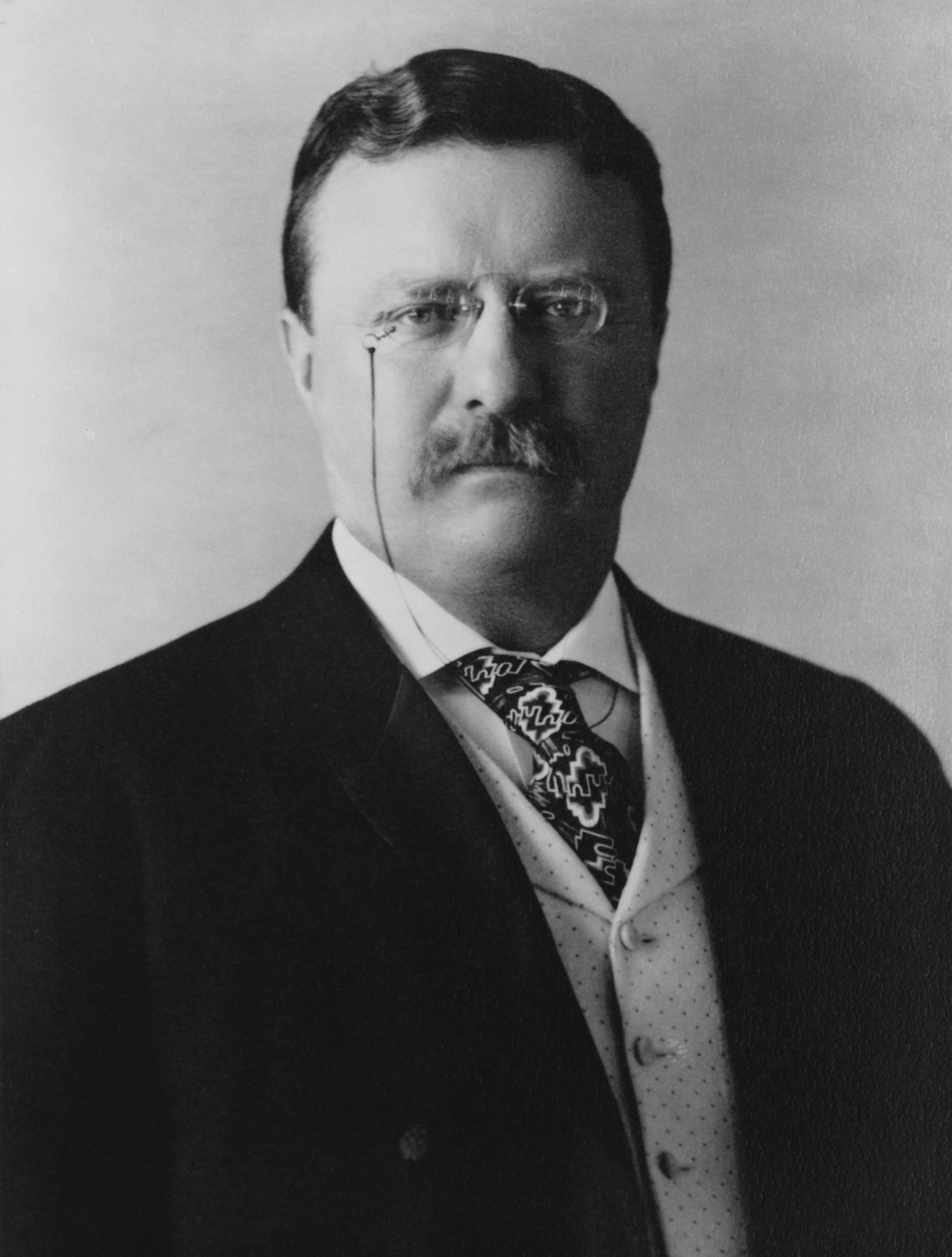
President Theodore Roosevelt

=== United States presidents ===
- Rutherford B. Hayes, Kenyon
- Theodore Roosevelt, Harvard
- Franklin D. Roosevelt, Harvard (Note: Franklin D. Roosevelt was a member of the Alpha chapter of DKE at Harvard and would be considered the sixth DKE brother to serve as President of the United States; however, the Harvard chapter was de-recognized by DKE International due to the chapter's stance on dual membership with other fraternities.)
- Gerald Ford, Michigan
- George H. W. Bush, Yale
- George W. Bush, Yale

=== Vice presidents ===
- Dan Quayle, DePauw
- Theodore Roosevelt, Harvard
- Gerald Ford, Michigan
- George H. W. Bush, Yale

=== Other notable members ===
Many American and Canadian politicians, businessmen, sports figures, and artists have been members, including Joe Paterno, Herb Kelleher, J.P. Morgan, Jr., William Randolph Hearst, Cole Porter, Brett Kavanaugh, Ron DeSantis, Bradley Palmer, Henry Cabot Lodge, Dick Clark, Tom Landry, David Milch, and George Steinbrenner. ΔΚΕ flags were carried to the North Pole by its discoverer, Admiral Robert Peary and to the moon by astronaut Alan Bean.

During the Civil War, the first Union officer killed in battle was member Theodore Winthrop of Phi chapter.

A poem published in 1897, titled Brothers in DKE, was based on an anecdote of a Union soldier, Edwin S. Rogers of Maine, who was mortally wounded on 7 June 1864, at the Battle of Cold Harbor. An unnamed confederate soldier happened upon Rogers, who was wearing a DKE pin on his uniform. As the confederate soldier was also a DKE member, he gave aid and comfort to his fraternity brother, until he died shortly after. The soldier then sent the pin to Rogers family.

During the Spanish–American War, the first American officer to be killed was a fraternity member, Surgeon John B. Gibbs (Phi Chi). ΔΚΕ member J. Frank Aldritch (Psi Phi) died when the USS Maine was sunk.

The fraternity has fifteen Medal of Honor recipients: George N. Bliss (Delta), Deming Bronson (Kappa Epsilon), Allen Buchanan (Psi Phi), Richard E. Fleming (Phi Epsilon), George W. Ford (Zeta), Webb Hayes (Delta Chi), Ruel Milton Johnson (Omicron), Charles Mattocks (Theta), Samuel E. Pingree (Pi), Adolphus Staton (Beta), Wager Swayne (Phi), Edward N. Whittier (Upsilon), and Eri D. Woodbury (Sigma).

Yung Wing, the first Chinese graduate from an American university in 1854, was a member of the Phi chapter.

== Awards ==
Delta Kappa Epsilon presents several international awards recognizing outstanding chapters, undergraduate members, and alumni. The fraternity's highest chapter honor is the Lion Trophy, awarded annually to the chapter judged to have demonstrated the strongest overall performance in chapter operations, leadership, scholarship, and philanthropy. Additional Lion Trophy Achievement Awards recognize excellence in individual categories including chapter operations, leadership, scholarship, and community service.

The fraternity also presents the Delta Award, established in 2013, to the chapter showing the greatest improvement during the preceding year. Individual undergraduate honors include the Charles O. Blaisdell ΔΚΕ Leadership Award, awarded annually to the undergraduate member judged to best exemplify leadership, scholarship, character, and service to both his university and Delta Kappa Epsilon, and the Nick Napolitano Award, recognizing the fraternity's outstanding undergraduate chapter president. The latter award was established in memory of Nicholas Val Napolitano of Wake Forest University, who died in 2011 while attempting to rescue a fellow fraternity member from drowning.

Recipients of the Charles O. Blaisdell ΔΚΕ Leadership Award have included Darren Cole (2011), Donald Kleckner (2012), Alex Hurley (2013), Luke Wetton (2014), Matt Rose (2015), Jake Beach (2016), Devin Tarantino (2017), Gautier Parthon de Von (2018), Demetri Maxim (2019), Christian Kappes (2021), and Sami Muslmani (2022).

Among alumni honors, the Henderson Award, established in 1975 and named for former Executive Director William M. Henderson, is considered Delta Kappa Epsilon's highest alumni award. It is presented for exceptional service to a local DKE chapter.

The fraternity's educational foundation separately administers a number of undergraduate scholarships and leadership-development grants for members of Delta Kappa Epsilon chapters.

== Controversies and member misconduct ==
- In 1846, one year after establishing the Zeta chapter at Princeton University and reportedly very unpopular with staff, the chapter was kicked off campus. The chapter was reinstated six years later and again removed from campus and the charter revoked. Only 69 members were initiated during the chapter's brief existence.
- On June 6, 1892, a pledge was led blindfolded through the street during his fraternity initiation towards Moriarty's Cafe, a popular student hang-out. He was told to run and did so at top speed. He ran into a sharp carriage pole, injuring himself. He was rendered unconscious, but the injury was not thought to be serious at the time. He suffered an intestinal rupture and died five days later of peritonitis.
- In 1967, The New York Times reported on "frat-branding", the alleged use of a hot branding iron to make a Δ shaped scar on new fraternity members. The Yale chapter's then-president, George W. Bush, stated that they were "only cigarette burns."
- In New Orleans in 1987, dozens of ΔΚΕ fraternity members marched in blackface in a parade in broad daylight.
- In 1989, Colgate University banned all ΔΚΕ activities after the officials found members guilty of hazing, blackballing and other violations of university regulations. In 2005 Colgate University barred the fraternity from campus for refusing to sell its house to the school and join a new student-residence initiative. ΔΚΕ filed a lawsuit charging that the school violated its right to free association as well as antitrust laws by monopolizing the student housing market. In 2006, the Supreme Court of Madison County found that the fraternity had failed to state a cause of action and that its claim was "time-barred."
- In 1989, Virginia Tech banned all ΔΚΕ activities on campus and asked the national office to revoke its charter after reports of a racially tinged hazing incident during a pledge trip to Kenyon College in Ohio surfaced on campus. After the allegations emerged the Virginia Tech administration under President James D. McComas acted swiftly and terminated the registration of DKE and ended its affiliation with the university less than a week later. Allegedly, a white ΔΚΕ pledge had asked a black student at a Kenyon College party in Gambier, Ohio if he could kiss her while another pledge photographed them. The pledge had been instructed to do something unusual during the trip and bring back photos to prove it. After friends of the woman learned of the incident, an argument ensued and the Virginia Tech pledges were escorted off the Kenyon College campus. Its charter was not revoked and the DKE chapter continued to operate in its off-campus house in Blacksburg despite the ban. Through the efforts of influential Virginia Tech DKE alumni and university donors, the chapter was ultimately re-instated in the mid-1990s.
- In 1997, members of ΔΚΕ at Loyola University New Orleans and Tulane University invited students to celebrate Martin Luther King's Birthday "with fried chicken from Popeye's, watermelon and a 'forty'."
- In December 2008, the University of California, Berkeley suspended recognition of the local DKE chapter for alcohol, hazing, and fire safety misconduct. The chapter never closed and continued without affiliation or oversight by UC Berkeley. The national office and the alumni association maintained their association with the local chapter. Four years later, the chapter opted not to reapply for recognition by the university and continued as an independent fraternity. In May 2012, during a routine patrol of the campus, the County Vice Enforcement Team visited the chapter. Several citations were issued for underage drinking.
- In October 2010, Phi chapter at Yale came under fire after its members shouted inflammatory and misogynistic chants at an Old Campus pledge ritual, including "No means yes. Yes means anal". The chapter's president, Jordan Forney, apologized for the fraternity's conduct, characterizing it as a "lapse in judgment." but Yale's feminist magazine Broad Recognition called for administrative action against the leadership of ΔΚΕ. By October 24, 2010, Dean Mary Miller of Yale College had strongly recommended to the ΔΚΕ National Executive Director, Dr. Douglas Lanpher, that the chapter at Yale be put on probation indefinitely. Instead, on May 17, 2011, the chapter was suspended for five years. The order barred ΔΚΕ from conducting any activities on the Yale campus during that time.
- In January 2011, the ΔΚΕ chapter at the University of Alberta had its student group status suspended for five years after a hazing video surfaced of pledges being confined in a plywood box, forced to eat vomit, and deprived of sleep, by other fraternity members.
- In November 2014, a ΔΚΕ colony in Edinburgh, since closed, had the minutes leaked from a meeting in March 2014 by the University of Edinburgh student newspaper, The Student. The minutes allegedly referred to comments that joked about rape, sexual harassment, transphobia and hazing. The story gained traction in both national and international media, being picked up by The Independent, The Huffington Post, and Time magazine.
- In 2018, after Christine Blasey Ford accused Brett Kavanaugh of sexual assault, an old photograph surfaced showing two members of ΔΚΕ marching across the Yale campus, one carrying a flag made from women's underwear. Kavanaugh, who is not in the photograph, was a member of the fraternity when the photograph was taken. One of the members told the student paper that the underwear was obtained consensually, but female classmates said their rooms were ransacked by ΔΚΕ members while they were in class, saying they were "loud, entitled, pushy and creepy".
- In 2019, the chapter at Louisiana State University (LSU) was issued a 10 year suspension for hazing. According to official reports, pledges were kicked by fraternity members wearing steel-toe boots, made to lie down in broken glass, were forced to sit in an ice machine in only their underwear, and subjected to other types of illegal hazing. Nine fraternity members were arrested on hazing charges. Prior to 2019, the chapter had a long history of violations and suspensions. However, in 2025, the chapter was allowed to officially return to LSU.

== See also ==
- List of social fraternities
