= Christian psychology =

Aspect of psychology adhering to the religion of Christianity

Christian psychology is a merger of theology and psychology. It is an aspect of psychology adhering to the religion of Christianity and its teachings of Jesus Christ to explain the human mind and behavior. Christian psychology is a term typically used in reference to Protestant Christian psychotherapists who strive to fully embrace both their religious beliefs and their psychological training in their professional practice. However, a practitioner in Christian psychology would not accept all psychological ideas, especially those that contradicted or defied the existence of God and the scriptures of the Bible.

In the United States, American Psychological Association approved courses in Christian psychology are available at undergraduate and graduate levels based on applied science, Christian philosophy and a Christian understanding of psychology. In modern psychological practices, Christianity is incorporated through various therapies. The main choice of practice is Christian counseling. It allows aspects of psychology, such as emotion, to be partially explained by Christian beliefs. The understanding of the human mind is thought of as both psychological and spiritual. G. C. Dilsaver is considered "the father of Christian psychology" according to the Catholic University of America, but the authors of Psychology and the Church: Critical Questions/Crucial Answers suggest that Norman Vincent Peale pioneered the merger of the two fields. Clyde M. Narramore had a major impact on the field of Christian psychology. He was the founding president of the Rosemead School of Psychology, now affiliated with Biola University., and which has published the Journal of Psychology & Theology since 1973. The Russian journal Konsultativnaya Psikhologiya i Psikhoterapiya publishes a special issue on Christian Psychology every year.

== History ==
Religious and science scholars have often clashed over the idea of the two subjects being combined, making Christian psychology no stranger to controversy. Christianity has affected the field of psychology throughout history and has influenced the beliefs and works of famous psychologists. In 17th-century Europe, aspects of psychology were thought to go against Christian teachings. For example, important figures such as Descartes, Locke, and Leibniz have delayed or altered their ideas to match culturally acceptable beliefs at the time. This is because the publication of psychological theories that went against Christian teachings often resulted in punishment.

Several early modern thinkers modified or delayed the publication of their ideas about the mind because the church authorities monitored writings that touched on the nature of the soul, consciousness, and free will. During the 17th and early 18th centuries, psychological speculation was closely tied to Christion theological doctrine and claims that appeared to challenge the immortality of the soul or divine causation risked being censured or banned. For example, the Catholic Church maintained the Index Librorum Prohibitorum, which listed works deemed contrary to Christian teaching, leading many scholars to self-censor. Historians note that Rene Descartes withheld certain writings on mind-body interaction to avoid accusations of heresy, and that John Locke soften passages in the Essay Concerning Human Understanding to align with Christian beliefs about the soul. These dynamics contributed to ongoing tensions between emerging scientific approaches psychology and religious institutions of the time.

The Enlightenment is a time period in which several groundbreaking ideas, including those of science and religion were introduced in Western society. Ideas geared toward the Catholic Church teachings were challenged. One scholar describes the shift in ideas during the Enlightenment as gradual and subtle, rather than sudden. Several philosophers contributed to the introduction of scientific ideas that clashed against religion at the time. One early contributor was a French philosopher, René Descartes. He reinforced an Aristotelian concept explaining the human mind that fit teachings of the Church—the idea of a soul. As time progressed, so did the existence and presence of once "radical" ideas. The question on the human ability to fully comprehend the existence of God was introduced by Pascal. Other philosophers, such as John Locke, brought on the concept of deism. Major ideas that influenced psychology and religion at the time were the rejection of "original sin", acceptance of personal morality without religion, and an emphasis on the individual conscience. However, while this time period brought on many radical ideas that contradicted ideas of the church, that is not to say they were completely rejected. Ideas such as atheism and deism were continued to be perceived as radical schools of thought. Religious teachings still remain influential in modern areas of psychology.

== Significant people ==
=== Juan Luis Vives ===
Juan Luis Vives (6 March 1493 – 6 May 1540), a Christian scholar who was greatly admired by the theologian Erasmus, has been referred to as "The father of modern psychology" (Watson, 1915). While it is unknown if Sigmund Freud was familiar with Vives's work, historian of psychiatry Gregory Zilboorg considered Vives a godfather of psychoanalysis. (A History of Medical Psychology, 1941). Vives was the first noted scholar to directly analyze the human psyche.

=== René Descartes ===
René Descartes, a famous French philosopher, contributed to the field of psychology while also keeping the Catholic church's beliefs in mind. Descartes's beliefs were controversial during the 17th-century because some of his beliefs went against Christian teachings. Contrary to Christian teachings, Descartes believed that animals could be understood as a machine that did not have a soul. Although he did not specifically say that humans did not have a soul, Christians found this statement to be controversial because human beings resembled animals. These beliefs were written in his work titled The World. The World was never published because Descartes feared the Catholic church would punish him for his controversial beliefs.

=== John Locke ===
John Locke was an English philosopher who took the stance of "reason" being "the last judge and Guide in ever Thing" even in religious matters. Evidence was not something he concerned himself with and was instead a seeker of consistency, meaning, and how humans should respond to desires, especially their own faith.

One of his major contributions to psychology was his theory of mind, in which this becomes the precursor to explaining the relationship between identity and the acquisition of knowledge. Locke claims the mind has innate capabilities that are responsible for translating knowledge into complex thoughts and correlations between ideas. For example, his theory offers an explanation of why some people equip themselves with the teachings of the Christian religion, and why others do not, even though they receive an identical indoctrination of Christianity.

=== Gottfried Leibniz ===
Gottfried Wilhelm Leibniz, was a Lutheran philosopher, who unlike Locke, believed that there are some religious ideas that stand on their own as being irrefutable and incontrovertible.

With this in mind, most of his philosophical ideas, including the ones that aided to the foundation of psychological concepts, were hoped to be nonintrusive to the Christian-based beliefs in Europe and also be used unified the division between the Christian denomination. As a major contribution to psychology, Leibniz made a distinction between conscious and unconscious states that Freud and other successors would further expand upon centuries later.

=== Søren Kierkegaard ===
Søren Kierkegaard (1813–1855) was a philosopher who contributed profound theoretical psychological works. Over the course of a decade he described the nature of personhood, sin, anxiety, the unconscious (before Freud), subjectivity, human development, and spiritual development from a Christian perspective. Kierkegaard is considered a "father" to therapeutic psychology. Podmore writes that, "The Sickness unto Death (1849) as an attempt to resolve the sinful 'self' by integrating a psychological perspective on despair with a theology of the forgiveness of sins." Julia Watkin (1998) stated that "It is highly likely that, but for the fact of his writing in a minority language, he would have been hailed, long before the advent of Freud, as a founder of an important depth psychology." Erikson, who studied under Anna Freud, went further saying Kierkegaard, not Sigmund Freud, was the first genuine psychoanalyst. Charles Carr (1973) said the "penetrating quality of Kierkegaard's insights into guilt, dread, sin, and despair also render him worthy of recognition as the father of modern therapeutic psychology."

== Modern influences ==
=== Christian counseling ===
Christian counseling is a manner of psychological therapy that emphasizes the importance of person's relationship with God. Christian counseling utilizes the ideas of Christian psychology in order to properly understand and treat patients. Both Christian psychology and Christian counseling help people understand the self psychologically and in the eyes of God. This specific form of counseling incorporates a person's unique religious views to create a more individualized form of treatment. This treatment tends to center around Jesus Christ and the persons perceived relationship with him. The better the relationship with him, the better the patients life and understanding of their life they have.

== See also ==
- American Association of Christian Counselors
- Nouthetic counseling
- Fyodor Dostoevsky
