= Clyde M. Narramore =

American writer (1916–2015)

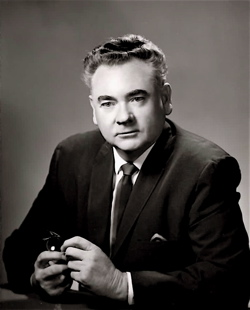
- Born: Clyde M. Narramore; November 25, 1916; Palo Verde, Arizona
- Died: July 27, 2015 (aged 98); Pasadena, California
- Occupations: Writer; Public speaker Psychologist; Radio broadcaster
- Spouse: Ruth Narramore
- Children: Melodie Narramore Yocum; Kevin Narramore

Clyde M. Narramore (November 25, 1916 – July 27, 2015) was an American author of more than 100 books and booklets, including the best sellers The Psychology of Counseling, The Encyclopedia of Psychological Problems and This Way to Happiness. He was the founding president of the first international non-profit Christian counseling and training organization, the Narramore Christian Foundation. In 1954 he and his wife, Ruth Narramore, began a daily radio broadcast called Psychology for Living, which was eventually aired on over 300 radio stations across the United States and abroad. Sensing a need to offer advanced training in psychology shaped by a Christian worldview, in 1970 Narramore became the founding president of the Rosemead School of Psychology, now affiliated with Biola University.

== Early life ==
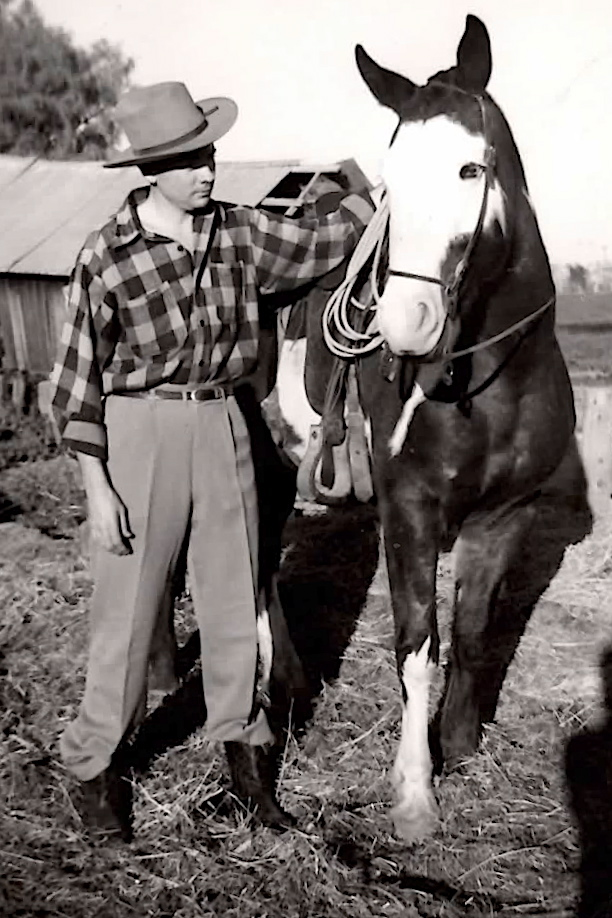
Narramore on the family ranch in Palo Verde, Arizona

Born in Palo Verde, Arizona, Clyde Narramore was the youngest son of homesteaders Edward and Emma Narramore. He was born and raised on a rural ranch with his sister and five brothers. At the age of two, he lost his father to the 1918 flu pandemic.

Narramore was educated in a one-room school house and attended the Palo Verde Baptist Church. In his teens he showed an interest in music, athletics and public speaking. After the Great Depression, he attended Arizona State University and the University of Southern California where he studied psychology, education, business and music. During World War II, Narramore served as a U.S. Naval Officer at an anti-aircraft base in Long Island, New York and at a U.S. Naval Operations Base near Reykjavík, Iceland. During his time in New York, he met his wife, Ruth Elliott, and they wed in 1946.

== Career and ministry ==
Narramore earned his Doctorate in Education from Columbia University. He became a licensed psychologist in California, and served thirteen years on staff at the Los Angeles County Superintendent of Schools, where he co-authored two books used throughout the county's school system.

In 1953, Narramore, along with Benjamin Weiss, the Principal of the Los Angeles Metropolitan High School, co-founded the National Educators Fellowship, now known as the Christian Educators Association International. The purpose of the organization was to encourage, equip and empower Christians serving in public education.

In 1958, Narramore founded the Narramore Christian Foundation, the first international Christian counseling and training ministry. More than five thousand ministers and missionaries, business people, parents, educators, and the sons and daughters of missionaries, have participated in one, two and three-week seminars at the Narramore Christian Foundation's southern California campus.

In 1970, Narramore was the founding president of the Rosemead School of Psychology, now part of Biola University, where nearly one thousand graduate students have since received doctoral degrees. His nephew, Bruce Narramore, was a co-founder and first academic dean. The graduate school publishes the scholarly Journal of Psychology & Theology.

=== Psychology for Living ===
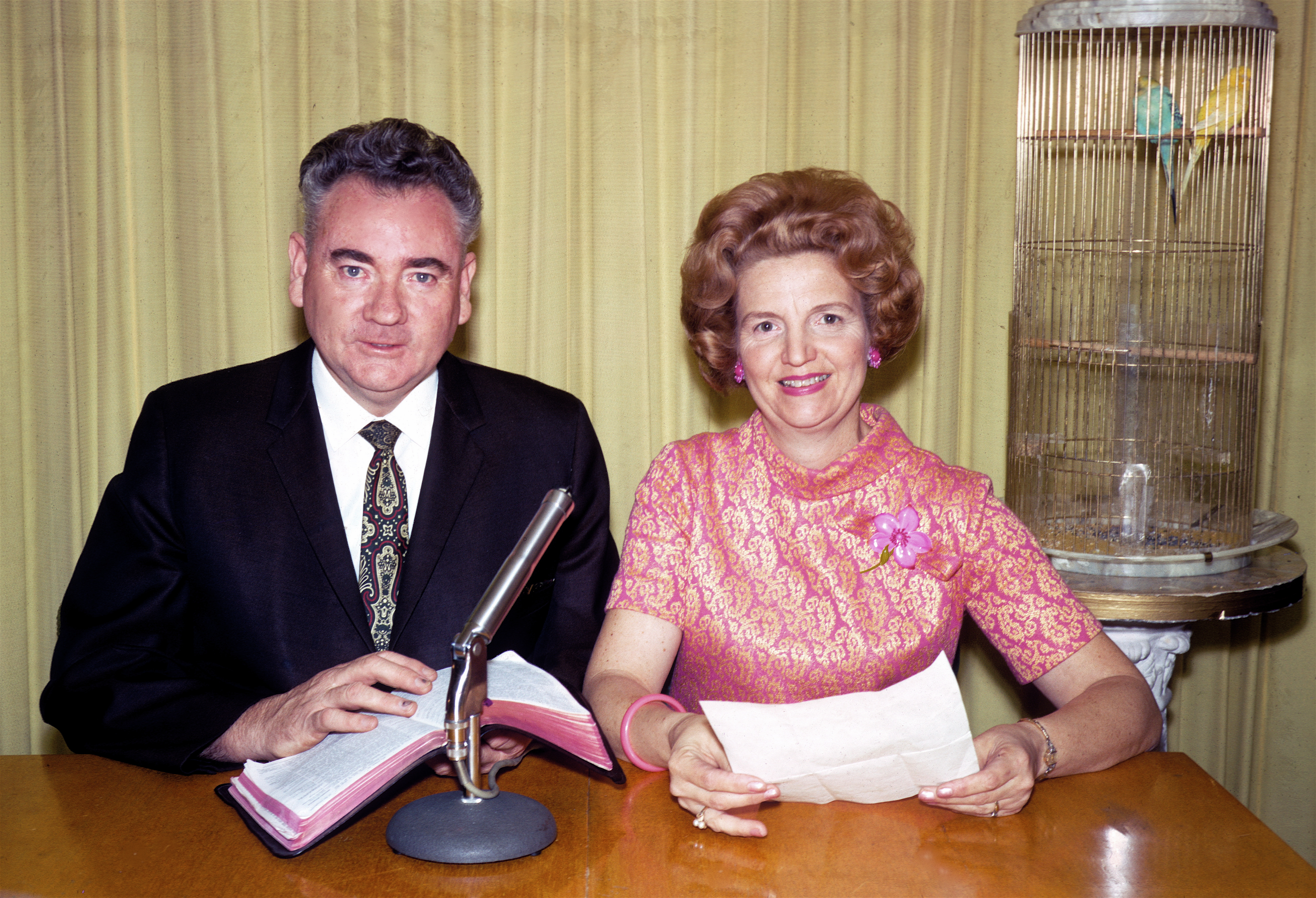
Clyde and Ruth Narramore preparing a radio broadcast

In 1954, Narramore and his wife Ruth began a radio broadcast and a monthly magazine entitled Psychology for Living. Narramore was the first licensed Christian psychologist to host an international radio show dealing with everyday problems. In each 15-minute broadcast, Ruth Narramore read a letter from a listener discussing a personal or family problem, and both Clyde and Ruth Narramore discussed the causes and solutions based on a holistic framework that considered physical, emotional and spiritual needs.

The broadcast was aired for more than forty years. The program accepted no commercial advertisements or endorsements, and the Narramores never asked for donations on the broadcast.

=== Seminars and speaking ===
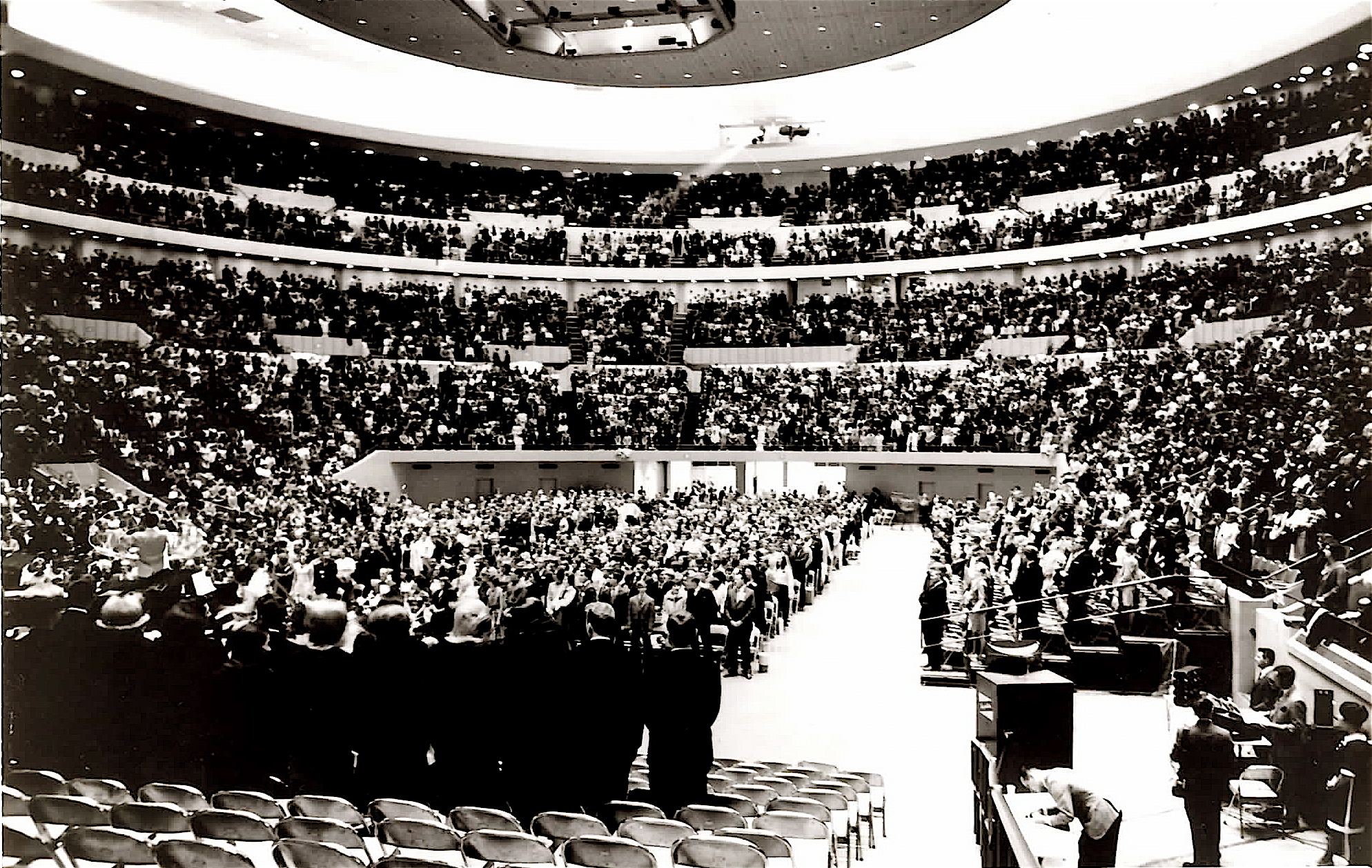
Narramore speaking at the American Sunday School Association in Cobo Hall, Detroit, Michigan

In 1953, Narramore began speaking at Bible conferences. He also rented the Lake Yale Baptist Conference Center grounds for his own annual conference. However, he spent much of his career leading and hosting lay seminars at the Narramore Christian Foundation's ten-acre conference facility in Rosemead, California. Seminar topics included morning devotions, psychological personality testing, presentations on identity of personhood; dealing with feelings of depression, anger and guilt; A New Biblical Self-Image, non-defensive communication, healthy sexual relations, parenting, and Responsible Christian Assertiveness. Each afternoon, conferees attended group therapy sessions and upon request, individual therapy with licensed Christian therapists. Many who attended the seminars wrote to Psychology for Living and stated the seminars to be a "turning point in their lives."

One of Narramore's favorite seminars was called "Re-entry" and was designed to guide and support the sons and daughters of Christian missionaries who were returning to America to attend college after living abroad. Narramore observed that missionary kids or third culture kids were above average in ability and intellect but often needed support adjusting to the major life transition of returning to the United States.

Narramore also accepted numerous invitations as a keynote speaker at Bible conferences, weekend seminars at churches, and such government institutions as the US State Department, Central Intelligence Agency, Pentagon, US Treasury Department, Justice Department, West Point, Annapolis and the U.S. Army War College. Narramore spoke at the White House under three Presidential administrations and in 1984 served with John Ashcroft and others on the Attorney General's Task Force on Family Violence under the Ronald Reagan Administration. He also served on the General Committee to produce the New King James Bible.

=== Approach to ministry ===
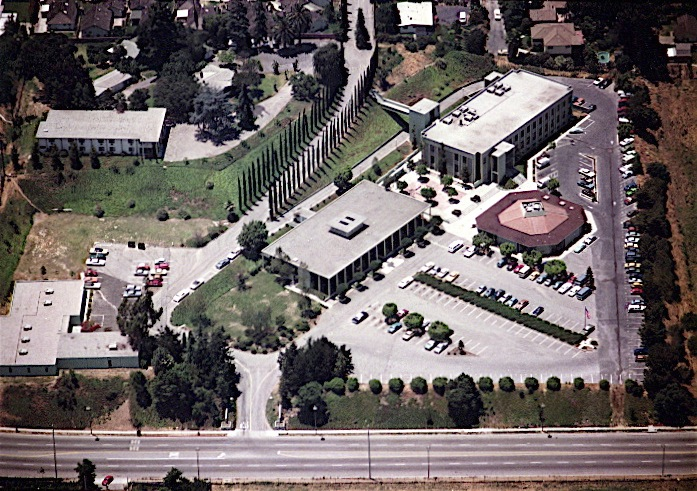
The Narramore Christian Foundation campus in Rosemead, California

During his graduate school days at Columbia University, Narramore was influenced by the book The Art of Readable Writing by Rudolph Flesch, who taught writers the discipline of simple, clear and effective prose. As Narramore started to write his own books, he strove to make professional psychology accessible to everyday people rather than writing scholarly journal articles.

During his time as a school psychologist, Narramore became increasingly aware of the effects that neurological impairments and chemical imbalances had on human behavior and frequently made referrals to physicians of neurology and endocrinology. Narramore was familiar with theories of psychodynamic, Rogerian and object relations psychology, but he was more informed by his own clinical experience and practical observations of basic emotional and relational needs. In some situations he also applied cognitive behavioral therapy to challenge people's irrational and destructive thoughts. Superordinate to these, however, was a high view of Christian scripture, which had priority over any other source of understanding.

Throughout the years, Narramore maintained a focus on ministering to the whole person. In his books and speaking engagements, Narramore strove to help audiences gain an understanding of why people think and act by discussing the "three spheres" of physical, emotional, and spiritual well-being. Historian David Watt writes that Narramore's counseling sought to deepen the spiritual lives of those who came to him for help." Although he integrated truths of psychology and theology, Narramore argued that knowing one's life purpose and God was the greatest of all human needs.

Known for being kindly and personable, Narramore had an open-door policy throughout his career. Conference attendants, staff from the Narramore Christian foundation, and other visitors were always welcomed into his office. He frequently received phone calls at home from radio listeners who needed counseling or referrals. Ruth Narramore acknowledged many listeners would call at all hours of the day and night, unaware of the time differences across the United States.

Narramore personally knew and appreciated many of the evangelical Christian leaders of his day such as Billy Graham, Jack Wyrtzen, D. James Kennedy, Charles Stanley, Pat Robertson, and Bill Bright. Conferences at the Narramore Christian Foundation were always inter-denominational, and Narramore made a point to avoid divisive, sectarian squabbles. He often quoted Galatians 6:2, "Bear one another's burdens and so fulfill the law of Christ".

=== Conversion and impact ===
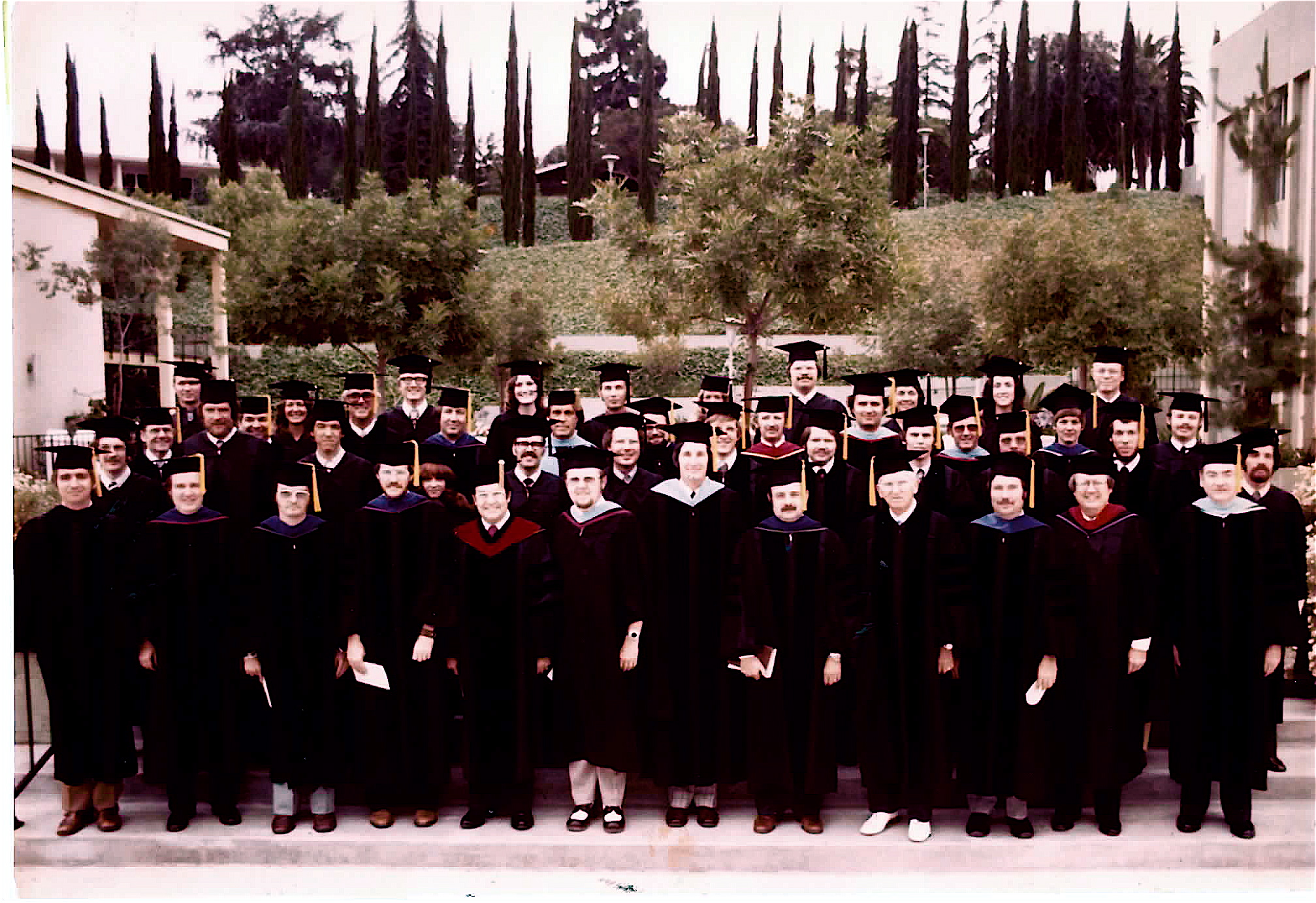
Early graduates of the Rosemead School of Psychology

One of the first times Narramore heard about the Gospel was as a young boy attending a country church in his hometown. The minister spoke on the human condition being one of sin and separation from God without Christ. These words made Narramore deeply uncomfortable. As a result, he avoided eye contact with the minister and hid behind a stove pipe. Years later at age eleven, Clyde was riding his horse by an irrigation ditch thinking about his life. According to his autobiography, Narramore's heart became so heavy that he slid off his horse, bent his knees and began to pray. He confessed his sins and asked Christ to save him. He concluded his prayer by saying, "I'll serve you as long as I live."

Billy Graham stated, "Dr. Narramore has had one of the most unique ministries of our generation." Leaders such as James Dobson, Bruce Wilkinson, C. Everett Koop and Gary Collins have called Narramore a "pioneer in Christian psychology." Prior to Narramore's time, the behavioral sciences had been widely regarded by evangelicals as a field for practicing atheists. Narramore's book, The Psychology for Counseling, had 20 printings and was featured in Petersens' 100 Christian Books that Changed the Century. According to the authors, Narramore "gave evangelicals permission to consult modern psychology and psychiatry alongside the Bible for the answers to their problems" in a time when many conservative Christians believed that all psychology was anti-biblical.

According to Pennsylvania-based psychologist and former Narramore Christian Foundation staff member, Kenneth Markley,

Dr. Narramore's overall influence has resulted in motivating thousands of college students to enter the field of professional counseling. This resulted in the establishment of privately owned Christian counseling offices and clinics throughout the United States. These psychologists provide both individual counseling for persons in need and many also serve as professors on college and university faculties. Local churches now have the benefit of these licensed counseling professionals who offer seminars and conferences on an area-wide basis as well as at interdenominational conferences. Additionally, some of the graduates of the Narramore-established Rosemead School of Psychology, serve on state professional psychological associations where their Christian input provides spiritual balance. Professional Psychological Journals regularly publish articles written by Rosemead graduates adding another benefit to the psychological community as a whole.

Other Rosemead graduates such as John Townsend and Henry Cloud have helped millions of readers and radio audiences through their own books and radio programs. Narramore is also known for mentoring James Dobson to pursue the field of psychology and was interviewed by Dobson on a Focus on the Family radio program entitled Clyde Narramore: Mentor and Friend.

== Personal life ==
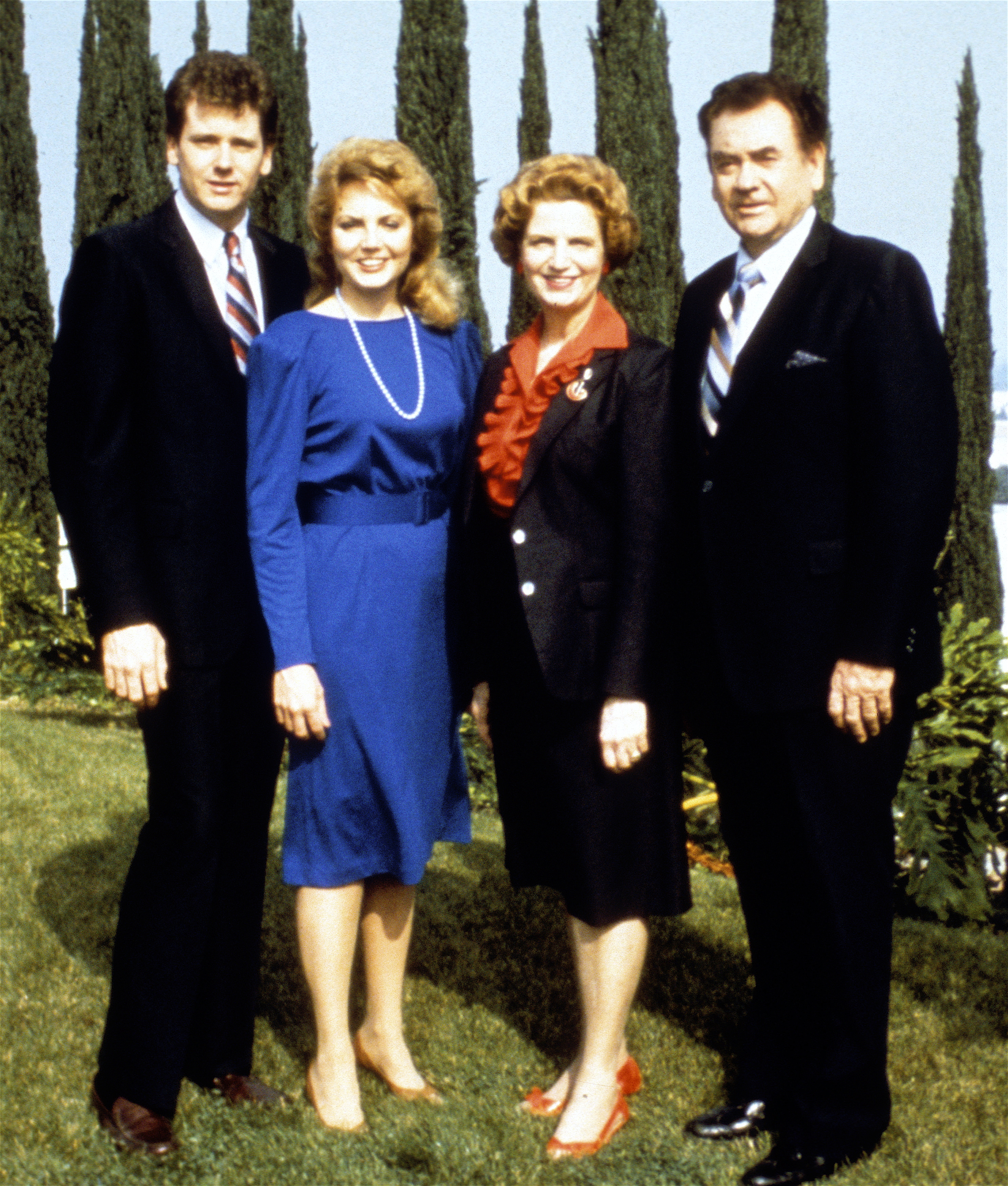
Kevin, Melodie, Ruth and Clyde Narramore

In 1946, Clyde Narramore married Ruth Elliott, whose parents were missionaries in China. Throughout her career, Ruth was a professional artist, musician, magazine editor and poet. They were married for 64 years until her death in 2010. The Narramores had two children, Melodie and Kevin. Clyde Narramore is also the uncle of psychologist S. Bruce Narramore, an author, former Biola University professor and the past president of the Narramore Christian Foundation (NCF) in Arcadia, California. During this tenure as NCF's president, Bruce Narramore led a series of field retreats and seminars for missionaries and sons and daughters of missionaries. He also helped to found a Ph.D. program in Christian counseling at the Asia Graduate School of Theology–Philippines.

With the help of Lee Bendell, Clyde and Ruth Narramore enjoyed leading international Christian tour groups each August for more than 20 years. On his Hawaii tours, Narramore would often sing and play his ukulele. The family was musical and often performed as a four-part singing group during their seminars and while traveling abroad.

In the 1980s, Melodie and Kevin were gospel recording artists with the Bread and Honey record label. Melodie Narramore Yocum was also the Director of Theater Arts at California Baptist University in Riverside, California, until she died in 2007. Clyde's son, Kevin Narramore, is a behavioral scientist, author, researcher and speaker. Kevin created the International Trauma Response Program at the Narramore Christian Foundation when he served as Executive Vice President. Expanding on his father's tradition of whole-person wellness, Kevin founded the Narramore Institute, whose mission is to "educate, inspire and empower leaders and organizations to implement solutions to today's most pressing health and productivity challenges".

"Every person is worth understanding" was Narramore's most famous motto and is the title of his autobiography.

== Selected works ==
=== Books and pamphlets ===
- A Christian Answers Kinsey, Van Kampen Press, Wheaton, Illinois, 1954.
- God's Will for Your Life, Word of Life, Schroon Lake, New York, 1957.
- How to Tell Your Children About Sex, Zondervan, Grand Rapids, Michigan, 1958.
- Guiding Today's Children, Los Angeles County Superintendent of Schools Office, Los Angeles, CA. 1959.
- Psychology of Counseling, Zondervan, Grand Rapids, Michigan, 1960.
- Guiding Today's Youth, Los Angeles County Superintendent of Schools Office, Los Angeles, CA. 1961.
- How to Study and be Successful in School, Zondervan, Grand Rapids, Michigan, 1961.
- How to Begin and Improve family Devotions, Zondervan, Grand Rapids, Michigan, 1961.
- Dating, Zondervan, Grand Rapids, Michigan, 1961.
- Is Your Child Gifted?, Narramore Christian Foundation, Rosemead, CA, 1961.
- Understanding and Guiding Teenagers, Zondervan, Grand Rapids, Michigan, 1965.
- Encyclopedia of Psychological Problems: A Counseling Manual, Zondervan, Grand Rapids, Michigan, 1966.
- A Woman's World, Zondervan, Grand Rapids, Michigan, 1966.
- A Christian View of Birth Control, Zondervan, Grand Rapids, Michigan, 1966.
- How to Understand and Influence Children, Zondervan, Grand Rapids, Michigan, 1967.
- Improving Your Self-Confidence, Zondervan, Grand Rapids, Michigan, 1967.
- Counseling with Youth at Church, School and Camp, Narramore Christian Foundation, 1969 (Pamphlet).
- How to Choose Your Life's Work, Narramore Christian Foundation, Rosemead, CA, 1970.
- How to Handle Feelings of Depression, Zondervan, Grand Rapids, Michigan, 1970.
- Life & Love, Zondervan, Grand Rapids, Michigan, 1971.
- The Psychology of Counseling, Zondervan, Grand Rapids, Michigan, 1972.
- How to Win Over Nervousness, Zondervan, Grand Rapids, Michigan, 1972.
- A Woman's World, Zondervan, Grand Rapids, Michigan, 1972.
- Problems Missionaries Face, Zondervan, Grand Rapids, Michigan, 1973.
- How to Build Bridges to Other People, Zondervan, Grand Rapids, Michigan, 1974.
- The Mature Years, Zondervan, Grand Rapids, Michigan, 1974.
- How to Handle Pressure, Tyndale House Publishers, 1975.
- Young Only Once Secrets of Fun and Success, Zondervan, Grand Rapids, Michigan, 1976.
- How to Succeed in Family Living, Regal, 1977.
- Unmarried Woman, Zondervan, Grand Rapids, Michigan, 1978.
- Happiness in Marriage, Zondervan, Grand Rapids, Michigan, 1978.
- Young Children and Their Problems, Zondervan, Grand Rapids, Michigan, 1979.
- Young Only Once, Zondervan, Grand Rapids, Michigan, 1983.
- The Compact Encyclopedia of Psychological Problems, Zondervan, Grand Rapids, Michigan, 1984.
- This Way to Happiness, Zondervan, Grand Rapids, Michigan, 1984.
- Parents at Their Best, T. Nelson Publishers, 1985.
- Touched by his Love, Narramore Christian Foundation, (Pamphlet), 1987.
- A Pre-Marriage Checklist: Looking before Leaping, Narramore Christian Foundation, (Pamphlet), 1990.
- Developing Confidence, Narramore Christian Foundation, (Pamphlet), 1999.
- Danger Signals in Your Child's Behavior, Narramore Christian Foundation, (Pamphlet), 2000.
- Married to a Non-Christian, Narramore Christian Foundation, (Pamphlet), 2001.
- How to Relate Better to People, Narramore Christian Foundation, (Pamphlet), 2001.
- Violence & Abuse in the Home, Narramore Christian Foundation, (Pamphlet), 2001.
- The Emotionally Healthy Family, Narramore Christian Foundation, (Pamphlet), 2001.
- Anxiety... The Nagging Emotion, Narramore Christian Foundation, (Pamphlet), 2002.

=== Videos ===
- Guarding Your Self-Esteem, Narramore Videos.
- New Foundations with Dr. Clyde: How to Handle Severe Financial Loss, Narramore Videos.
- Ten Danger Signals in your Child's Behavior, Narramore Videos.
- As the Twig is Bent, Narramore Videos.
- Closeness in Marriage, Narramore Videos.
- Building Bridges to Others: How to Get People to Like You, Narramore Videos.
- How to Raise Happy Christian Kids, Narramore Videos.
- Dealing with Feelings of Anger, Narramore Videos.
- A New Biblical Self-Image, Narramore Videos.
- Responsible Christian Assertiveness: Becoming the Person God Wants You to Be, Narramore Videos.
