= Narramore =

Narramore is a surname. Notable people with the surname include:

- Clyde M. Narramore (1916–2015), American writer
- Ruth Narramore (1923–2010), American magazine editor, writer, poet and musician
