= American Association of Christian Counselors =

Psychology non-profit organization

The American Association of Christian Counselors, Inc. (AACC) is the largest organization of Christian counselors in the world.

== Overview ==
It is a corporation headquartered in Forest, Virginia, United States. AACC, as it is often called, creates the largest gathering of Christian counselors once per year in North America with annual conferences that often exceed 5,000 attendees. Speakers for these events include, Dr. Henry Cloud, Dr. John Townsend, Gary Smalley, Larry Crabb, T.D. Jakes, Ron Hawkins, John Trent, Emmerson Eggrich, Joni Tada, Arch Harte, John Eldredge, and a host of other popular Christian writers. AACC is under the direction of Dr. Tim Clinton and celebrated their 25th anniversary as a professional trade association in 2011. They were previously headquartered in Fairfax, Virginia. It has about nearly 50,000 members. It publishes two journals: Christian Counseling Today and Marriage and Family: A Christian Journal. It has adopted a code of ethics used for Christian counseling. In 2014, AACC amended its code of ethics to eliminate the promotion of conversion therapy for same-sex attracted individuals, encouraging those individuals to practice a celibate life instead.
