= Jay E. Adams =

American Presbyterian author (1929–2020)

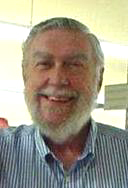
- Born: January 30, 1929; Baltimore, Maryland, U.S.
- Died: November 14, 2020 (aged 91)
- Occupations: Counselor, writer, founder of The Institute for Nouthetic Studies

Jay Edward Adams (January 30, 1929 – November 14, 2020) was an American Reformed theologian and author best known for his role in developing and promoting a counseling approach known as nouthetic counseling. He was a key figure in the biblical counseling movement and authored over 100 books on theology, pastoral ministry, and Christian counseling.

== Early life and education ==
Jay E. Adams (January 30, 1929 – November 14, 2020) was born in Baltimore, Maryland, the son of a police officer, Joseph Edward Adams, and Anita Louise (Barnsley) Adams. Raised in a nonreligious household, he converted to Christianity during his teenage years after reading the New Testament. He enrolled at the Reformed Episcopal Seminary in Philadelphia at age 15 and later earned degrees from Johns Hopkins University and Temple University. He completed doctoral studies at the University of Missouri, where he focused on effective communication and preaching.

== Career and ministry ==
In 1952, Adams served the first of what would be several pastorates, initially in the United Presbyterian Church and later in the more conservative Bible Presbyterian Church. In 1963 he moved to New Jersey to become the pastor of a congregation in the Orthodox Presbyterian Church, and that same year began teaching part-time at Westminster Theological Seminary. He initially taught homiletics but was assigned to teach pastoral counseling. Finding the existing Christian counseling literature heavily influenced by secular psychology, Adams sought to develop a method grounded in biblical exegesis. His encounter with psychologist O. Hobart Mowrer in 1965 influenced his rejection of prevailing psychological models and reinforced his belief that Scripture alone should form the basis of counseling.

In 1968, Adams co-founded the Christian Counseling and Educational Foundation (CCEF) with John Bettler in suburban Philadelphia. In 1970, he published the book Competent to Counsel, in which he outlined a counseling methodology based on admonition, confrontation, and biblical instruction. He called this system nouthetic counseling, derived from the Greek word nouthesia. The book generated significant debate within Christian counseling circles and led to the expansion of CCEF and later the formation of the National Association of Nouthetic Counselors (now the Association of Certified Biblical Counselors).

In 1982, Adams helped establish a Doctor of Ministry program in homiletics at Westminster Theological Seminary in California and continued to write extensively. Along with George Scipione, he opened up a branch of CCEF in Escondido, California. In 1990, he moved to South Carolina, where he helped plant an Associate Reformed Presbyterian Church congregation and later founded the Institute for Nouthetic Studies (INS), a training organization for biblical counseling.

Adams retired from pastoral ministry in 1997 but remained active in writing and teaching. In 2015, the Institute for Nouthetic Studies was merged with Mid-America Baptist Theological Seminary, which undertook efforts to reprint Adams' works. His writings cover a wide range of topics including biblical counseling, preaching, theology, and Christian living.

== Critique of psychology ==
Adams was strongly critical of most psychological theories and argued that counseling should be done by pastors, not mental health professionals. He believed that the field of psychology was confused and divided, with many competing theories, which in his view demonstrated that it wasn’t reliable. He quoted from the writings of well-known critics of psychiatry, such as Hobart Mowrer, William Glasser, Thomas Szasz, and Perry London, to support his arguments.

Adams thought that psychology could be useful in limited ways, such as for research or medical treatment, but not for counseling. He focused on the idea that most psychological theories were in opposition to Christian beliefs. He spoke and wrote in a bold, combative style, and aimed to rally conservative Christians.

Adams also warned that churches were being misled by accepting psychological ideas, which he saw as harmful to both faith and ministry. He especially criticized pastors and counselors in both mainline and evangelical churches who used psychology, arguing that they were compromising Christian truth.

== Nouthetic counseling ==
According to an interview by Aaron Blumer, Adams' major influence on counseling was based on his book Competent to Counsel, published in 1970, when he was about 40 years old. From its ideas, Adams further developed what is known as nouthetic counseling. Over time, Adams became a popular advocate of "strictly biblical approaches" to counseling, described as having perspectives that have continued to influence evangelical Christianity in the early 21st century.

In the late 20th century, John F. MacArthur said that Adams, through his book Competent to Counsel (1970), gave the Christian church "an indispensable corrective to several trends that are eating away at the Church's spiritual vitality". Derek Tidball said that Adams made an "enormous contribution to the revival of biblical pastoral theology." According to Ian F. Jones, Tim Clinton, and George Ohlschlager, "Jay Adams brought a biblical revolution to Christian and pastoral counseling in the 1970s, challenging a field that was racing toward rancor, even dissolution by its fascination with all manner of anti-Christian psycho-babble." David Powlison said that Adams' writings provided "abundant resources for the development of counseling". These led to the establishment of various institutions based on his views.

=== Criticism ===
Some psychologists (both evangelical and non-evangelical) have argued that nouthetic counseling can do considerable harm to patients. Critics note that some of the recommended techniques are ineffective. Also, patients who are not helped by nouthetic counseling often consider themselves religious failures, adding to their problems. Further criticism comes from The Baker Encyclopedia of Psychology and Counseling, which states that "Adams seems to be not fully knowledgeable regarding the theories he criticizes" and that "confrontation is also essential to the theory of Adams." However, it also states that this confrontation "is defined as caring confrontation."

One of the earliest critics of nouthetic counseling came in 1975 from John D. Carter. In an article published in the Journal of Psychology and Theology, based on a talk that he had given the previous year to the Western Association of Christians for Psychological Studies, Carter divided his critique into four categories:

- Biblical concerns: nouthetic counseling (as espoused by Adams) reduces human nature to behavior and overlooks key biblical elements like the heart and soul.
- Psychological weaknesses: nouthetic counseling theory lacks empirical support and shows little awareness of research methodology.
- Intellectual gaps: nouthetic counseling theory misrepresents major theorists and uncritically favors others, reflecting bias over analysis.
- Theoretical incompleteness: the nouthetic counseling model lacks foundational theories of motivation and personality.

A rebuttal to Carter's critique of Jay Adams' theory of nouthetic counseling was published by psychologist Richard Ganz in a subsequent issue of the Journal of Psychology and Theology. In addition, Mark McMinn has written that "Dr. Adams has received a great deal of unfair, uninformed criticism from the Christian counseling community. Although I do not share Dr. Adams' opinion on confronting sin in counseling, I do respect his pioneering work in biblical counseling."

While not directly criticizing Adams, Reformed pastor and scholar J. Cameron Fraser has observed that Adams' successors in the biblical counseling movement, including David Powlison, John Bettler, and Ed Welch, appear to be much less harsh than Adams in their approach to various aspects of counseling including behavioral change, the appropriate Christian interaction with psychology and psychiatry, and the connection between depression and sin.

== Personal life and death ==
Adams married Betty Jane Whitlock in 1951, and the couple had four children. He died on November 14, 2020.

== Education ==
- Bachelor of Divinity Reformed Episcopal Seminary
- Bachelor of Arts in Classics Johns Hopkins University
- Masters in Sacred Theology Temple University
- PhD in Speech University of Missouri

== Publications ==
Adams wrote more than 100 books, including:

- The Biblical View of Self-Esteem, Self-Love, and Self-Image. Harvest House Publishers. 1986. ISBN 978-0-89081-553-3.
- The Big Umbrella. Calvary Press. 1972. ISBN 1-879737-75-2.
- The Christian Counselor's Manual, the practice of nouthetic counseling. Zondervan. 1988 [1973]. ISBN 0-310-51150-X.
- Christian Living in the Home. P & R Publishing. 1972. ISBN 0-87552-016-2.
- Competent to Counsel. Zondervan. 1986 [1970]. ISBN 0-310-51140-2.
- Handbook of Church Discipline: A Right and Privilege of Every Church Member. Zondervan. 1986. ISBN 0-310-51191-7.
- Marriage, Divorce, and Remarriage in the Bible. Zondervan. 1986. ISBN 0-310-51111-9.
- Preaching with Purpose: the urgent task of homiletics. Zondervan. 1998. ISBN 0-310-51091-0.
- Shepherding God's Flock: A Handbook on Pastoral Ministry, Counseling and Leadership. Zondervan. 1986. ISBN 0-310-51071-6.
- A Theology of Christian Counseling. Zondervan. 1986. ISBN 978-0-310-51101-4.
- How to Overcome Evil. P & R Publishing. 1977. ISBN 978-1-59638-222-0.

== Bibliography ==
- MacArthur, John; Wayne, Mack (August 2005), Counseling: How to Counsel Biblically, Thomas Nelson, ISBN 978-1-4185-0005-4.
- Powlison, David (2010), The Biblical Counseling Movement: History and Context, New Growth Press, ISBN 9781935273127.
