= Henry Cloud (disambiguation) =

Henry Cloud (born 1956) is a clinical psychologist

Henry Cloud may also refer to:

- Henry Roe Cloud (1884–1950), Winnebago Indian, educator, college administrator, government official, Presbyterian minister, and reformer
- A pseudonym used by John Pearson (author) (born 1930)
