= Jay E. Adams bibliography =

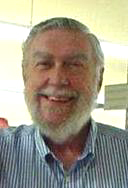
- Books↙: 108

This is a bibliography of the works of Jay E. Adams.

Jay Edward Adams (January 30, 1929 – November 14, 2020) was an American Presbyterian author who has written more than 100 books. His books have been translated into 16 languages, and he received his doctorate in preaching.

== Baptism ==
- The Meaning and Mode of Baptism. P & R Publishing. 1975. ISBN 0-87552-043-X.

== Counseling ==
- Competent to Counsel. Baker. 1970. ISBN 978-0-801-00047-8.
- Essays on counseling. Zondervan. 1972. ISBN 0-310-51171-2.
- Christian Living in the Home. P & R Publishing. 1972. ISBN 0-87552-016-2.
- Big Umbrella, The. Calvary Press. 1972. ISBN 1-879737-75-2.
- The Christian Counselor's Manual, the practice of nouthetic counseling. Baker. 1973. ISBN 978-0-801-00071-3.
- Pastoral Life, The. Zondervan. 1974.
- Pastoral Counseling. Zondervan. 1975.
- Pastoral Leadership. Zondervan. 1975.
- Use of Scripture in Counseling, The. P & R Publishing. 1975. ISBN 0-8010-0099-8.
- Your Place in the Counseling Revolution. P & R Publishing. 1975. ISBN 0-8010-0100-5.
- Coping with Counseling Crisis. P & R Publishing. 1976. ISBN 0-8010-0112-9.
- What about nouthetic counseling: A question and answer book with history, help and hope for the Christian counselor. Baker Book House. 1977. ISBN 0-8010-0114-5.
- Matters of Concern to Christian Counselors. Zondervan. 1977. ISBN 0-8010-0138-2.
- Lectures of Counseling. Baker Book House. 1978. ISBN 0-8010-0122-6.
- Four Weeks with God and Your Neighbor. P & R Publishing. 1978. ISBN 0-87552-020-0.
- Trust and Obey. P & R Publishing. 1978. ISBN 0-8010-0145-5.
- Communicating with 20th Century Man. P & R Publishing. 1979. ISBN 0-87552-008-1.
- More than Redemption. Zondervan. 1979. ISBN 0-8010-0159-5.
- Update on Christian Counseling, Volume 1. Zondervan. 1979.
- Helps for Counselors: A mini-manual for Christian Counseling. Baker Books. 1980. ISBN 0-8010-0156-0.
- Ready to Restore: The Layman's Guide to Christian Counseling. P & R Publishing. 1981. ISBN 978-0-87552-070-4.
- Christian Counselor's Wordbook, The. P & R Publishing. 1981. ISBN 0-87552-069-3.
- Update on Christian Counseling, Volume 2. Zondervan. 1981.
- How to Handle Trouble. P & R Publishing. 1982. ISBN 0-87552-076-6.
- Godliness Through Discipline. P & R Publishing. 1983. ISBN 0-87552-021-9.
- Grist from Adams' Mill. P & R Publishing. 1983. ISBN 0-87552-079-0.
- Power of Error. Baker Books. 1985. ISBN 0-8010-0141-2.
- Competent to Counsel. Zondervan. 1986. ISBN 0-310-51140-2. - edition with new publisher of the 1970 classic
- The Biblical View of Self-Esteem, Self-Love, and Self-Image. Harvest House Publishers. 1986. ISBN 978-0-89081-553-3.
- Theology of Christian Counseling, A. Zondervan. 1986. ISBN 0-310-51101-1.
- Christian Counselor's Casebook, The. Zondervan. 1986. ISBN 0-310-51161-5.
- Handbook of Church Discipline: A Right and Privilege of Every Church Member (Jay Adams Library). Zondervan. 1986. ISBN 0-310-51191-7.
- How to Help People Change. Zondervan. 1986. ISBN 0-310-51181-X.
- Marriage, Divorce, and Remarriage in the Bible. Zondervan. 1986. ISBN 0-310-51111-9.
- Shepherding God's Flock: A Handbook on Pastoral Ministry, Counseling and Leadership. Zondervan. 1986. ISBN 0-310-51071-6.
- Solving Marriage Problems. Zondervan. 1986. ISBN 0-310-51081-3.
- The Christian Counselor's Manual, the practice of nouthetic counseling. Zondervan. 1988. ISBN 0-310-51150-X. - edition with new publisher of the 1973 classic
- Christian Counselor's Commentary Galatians, Ephesians, Colossians, Philemon. Timeless Texts. 1995. ISBN 0-9643556-2-0.
- What to Do on Thursday: A Layman's Guide to the Practical Use of the Scriptures. Timeless Texts. 1995. ISBN 0-9643556-7-1.
- Teaching to Observe: The Counselor as Teacher. Timeless Texts. 1996. ISBN 0-9643556-8-X.
- A Thirst for Wholeness: How to Gain Wisdom from the Book of James. Timeless Texts. 1997. ISBN 0-9643556-9-8.
- From Forgiven to Forgiving: Learning to Forgive One Another God's Way. Calvary Press. 1997. ISBN 1-879737-12-4.
- Back to the Blackboard: Design for a Biblical Christian School. Timeless Texts. 1998. ISBN 1-889032-05-0.
- Christian Living in the World. Timeless Texts. 1998. ISBN 978-1-889032-10-8.
- Counsel from Psalm 119. Timeless Texts. 1998. ISBN 1-889032-07-7.
- Maintaining the Delicate Balance in Christian Living: Biblical Balance in a World That's Tilted Toward Sin!. Timeless Texts. 1998. ISBN 1-889032-11-5.
- The Christian's Guide to Guidance: How to Make Biblical Decisions in Everyday Life. Timeless Texts. 1998. ISBN 1-889032-06-9.
- Christ and Your Problems. P & R Publishing. 1999. ISBN 0-87552-011-1.
- Hebrews, James, I & II Peter, and Jude (Christian Counselor's Commentary). Timeless Texts. 1999. ISBN 1-889032-01-8.
- The Gospel of John & Letters of John and Jesus (Christian Counselor's Commentary). Timeless Texts. 1999. ISBN 1-889032-08-5.
- A Call for Discernment: Distinguishing Truth from Error in Today's Church. Timeless Texts. 1999. ISBN 1-889032-04-2.
- Acts (Christian Counselor's Commentary). Timeless Texts. 1999. ISBN 1-889032-14-X.
- I & II Corinthians (Christian Counselor's Commentary). Timeless Texts. 1999. ISBN 0-9643556-1-2.
- I & II Timothy, Titus (Christian Counselor's Commentary). Timeless Texts. 1999. ISBN 0-9643556-5-5.
- Life Under the Son: Counsel from the Book of Ecclesiastes. Timeless Texts. 1999. ISBN 1-889032-16-6.
- Proverbs (Christian Counselor's Commentary). Timeless Texts. 1999. ISBN 1-889032-03-4.
- Romans, I & II Thessalonians, and Philippians (Christian Counselor's Commentary). Timeless Texts. 1999. ISBN 0-9643556-6-3.
- The Gospel of Luke (Christian Counselor's Commentary). Timeless Texts. 1999. ISBN 1-889032-09-3.
- The Gospels of Matthew and Mark (Christian Counselor's Commentary). Timeless Texts. 1999. ISBN 1-889032-12-3.
- Wrinkled But Not Ruined: Counsel for the Elderly. Timeless Texts. 1999. ISBN 1-889032-13-1.
- Hope for the New Millennium. Timeless Texts. 2000. ISBN 1-889032-18-2.
- Signs & Wonders: In the Last Days. Timeless Texts. 2000. ISBN 1-889032-19-0.
- The Use of the Rod and Staff: A Neglected Aspect of Shepherding (Ministry Monographs for Modern Times). Timeless Texts. 2003. ISBN 1-889032-41-7.
- Is All Truth God's Truth? (Ministry Monographs for Modern Times). Timeless Texts. 2004. ISBN 1-889032-40-9.
- What to Do When Counseling Fails (Ministry Monographs for Modern Times). Timeless Texts. 2004. ISBN 978-1-889032-43-6.
- Christian Counselor's New Testament and Proverbs-OE. Timeless Texts. 2004. ISBN 1-889032-47-6.
- Committed to Craftmanship. Timeless Texts. 2004. ISBN 1-889032-23-9.
- Critical Stages of Biblical Counseling. Timeless Texts. 2004. ISBN 1-889032-30-1.
- Growing by Grace: Sanctification and Counseling (Ministry Monographs for Modern Times). Timeless Texts. 2004. ISBN 1-889032-42-5.
- Insight & Creativity in Christian Counseling: A Study of the Usual & the Unique. Timeless Texts. 2004. ISBN 1-889032-29-8.
- The Place of Authority in Christ's Church (Ministry Monographs for Modern Times). Timeless Texts. 2004. ISBN 1-889032-45-X.
- The Practical Encyclopedia of Christian Counseling. Timeless Texts. 2004. ISBN 1-889032-46-8.
- How to Help People in Conflict. Timeless Texts. 2005. ISBN 1-889032-50-6.
- The Case of the Hopeless Marriage: A Nouthetic Counseling Case from Beginning to End. Timeless Texts. 2007. ISBN 978-1-889032-52-8.
- Compassionate Counseling. Timeless Texts. 2007. ISBN 978-1-889032-59-7.
- Encouragement Isn't Enough. Timeless Texts. 2007. ISBN 978-1-889032-57-3.
- Importance of Faith in Counseling. Timeless Texts. 2007. ISBN 978-1-889032-58-0.
- Language of Counseling (Ministry Monographs for Modern Times). Timeless Texts. 2007. ISBN 978-1-889032-56-6.
- Greg Dawson and the Psychology Class. Timeless Texts. 2008. ISBN 978-1-889032-63-4.
- Joyfully Counseling People with New Hearts. Timeless Texts. 2008. ISBN 978-1-889032-62-7.
- How to Overcome Evil. P & R Publishing. 2010. ISBN 978-1-59638-222-0.
- Sibling Rivalry in the Household of God. Calvary Press. 2010. ISBN 978-1-879737-77-8.
- Together for Good: Counseling and the Providence of God. Timeless Texts. 2010. ISBN 978-1-889032-65-8.
- Winning the War Within: Biblical Strategy for Spiritual Warfare. Timeless Texts. 2011. ISBN 978-0-89081-732-2.
- Types of People: How to Counsel Them Biblically. Timeless Texts. 2011. ISBN 978-1-889032-67-2.

== Eschatology ==
- I Will Tell You the Mystery. A Press. 1959.
- Realized Millennialism. Self published. 1959.
- Visions of the Revelation. Whitford Press. 1999. ISBN 0-89865-824-1.
- Preterism: Orthodox or Unorthodox? (Ministry Monographs for Modern Times). Timeless Texts. 2004. ISBN 1-889032-44-1.
- The Time Is at Hand. Timeless Texts. 2004. ISBN 1-889032-24-7.
- The Time of the End: Daniel's Prophecy Reclaimed. Timeless Texts. 2004. ISBN 1-889032-21-2.

== Preaching ==
- Studies in Preaching, Volume 1. P & R Publishing. 1975.
- Studies in Preaching, Volume 3. P & R Publishing. 1975.
- Studies in Preaching, Volume 2. P & R Publishing. 1976.
- Essays on Biblical Preaching. Zondervan. 1986. ISBN 0-310-51041-4.
- Sermon Analysis. Accent Books. 1986. ISBN 0-89636-193-4.
- A Consumer's Guide to Preaching. Victor Books. 1991. ISBN 0-89693-398-9.
- Preaching With Purpose - the urgent task of homiletics. Zondervan. 1998. ISBN 0-310-51091-0.
- Preaching According to the Holy Spirit. Timeless Texts. 2000. ISBN 978-1-889032-17-7.
- Truth Apparent. Timeless Texts. 2004. ISBN 978-1-889032-33-7.
- Preaching to the Heart (Ministry Monographs for Modern Times). Timeless Texts. 2004. ISBN 1-889032-34-4.
- Pulpit Speech (Ministry Monographs for Modern Times). Timeless Texts. 2004. ISBN 978-1-889032-35-1.
- Truth Applied (Ministry Monographs for Modern Times). Timeless Texts. 2004. ISBN 1-889032-32-8.
- Be Careful How You Listen: How to Get the Most Out of a Sermon. Solid Ground Christian Books. 2007. ISBN 978-1-59925-113-4. - a revised edition of A Consumer's Guide to Preaching above
- Preaching That Persuades (Ministry Monographs for Modern Times). Timeless Texts. 2007. ISBN 978-1-889032-55-9.
- Preaching with Parables (Ministry Monographs for Modern Times). Timeless Texts. 2007. ISBN 978-1-889032-54-2.

== Other ==
- Prayers for Troubled Times. P & R Publishing. 1979. ISBN 0-8010-0161-7.
- Biblical Sonship: An Evaluation of the Sonship Discipleship Course. Timeless Texts. 1999. ISBN 1-889032-15-8.
- The Grand Demonstration. Timeless Texts. 2003. ISBN 0-941717-06-2.
- Fifty Difficult Passages Explained. Timeless Texts. 2008. ISBN 978-1-889032-64-1.
- Keeping the Sabbath Today?. Timeless Texts. 2008. ISBN 978-1-889032-61-0.
- Day by Day Along the Way. Timeless Texts. 2011. ISBN 978-1-889032-66-5.
