= Konsultativnaya Psikhologiya i Psikhoterapiya =

- Discipline: Psychotherapy
- Language: Russian
- Edited by: Fyodor Vasilyuk

Publication details
- History: 1992–present
- Publisher: Moscow City Psychological-Pedagogical University (Russia)
- Frequency: Quarterly
- Open access: Hybrid

Standard abbreviations
- ISO 4: Konsult. Psikhol. Psikhoter.

Indexing
- ISSN: 2075-3470

Links
- Journal homepage

Konsultativnaya Psikhologiya i Psikhoterapiya (Russian: Консультативная психология и психотерапия) is a Russian peer-reviewed scientific journal containing original research, systematic reviews etc. relating to the area of psychotherapy and counseling psychology. Having begun publishing in 1992, it became the first Russian journal on psychotherapy. It is published 4 times a year. The journal is indexed by the Supreme Certification Commission of Russia. The editor-in-chief is Fyodor Vasilyuk.

Formerly the journal was called the Moskovskiy Psikhoterapevticheskiy Zhurnal.

Much attention is given to the study of the relationship between psychotherapy and the Christian doctrine of salvation. A special issue on Christian psychology is published every year.

== See also ==
- List of psychotherapy journals
- Journal of Psychology & Theology
