= David Powlison =

American Christian counselor, theologian, and author (1949–2019)

David A. C. Powlison
- Born: December 14, 1949; Honolulu, Hawaii, U.S.
- Died: June 7, 2019 (aged 69); Glenside, Pennsylvania, U.S.
- Education: Harvard University (B.A., Social Relations, 1971); Westminster Theological Seminary (M.Div., 1980); University of Pennsylvania (Ph.D., History and Science of Medicine, 1996)
- Occupation: Christian counselor · Theologian · Author · Educator
- Years active: 1980–2019
- Organizations: Christian Counseling & Educational Foundation (CCEF); Westminster Theological Seminary; Journal of Biblical Counseling; Biblical Counseling Coalition
- Known for: Leading voice in the biblical counseling movement; executive director of CCEF; editor of Journal of Biblical Counseling
- Notable work: Power Encounters (1995); Seeing with New Eyes (2003); Speaking Truth in Love (2005); The Biblical Counseling Movement: History and Context (2010); Good and Angry (2016); The Pastor as Counselor (2021)
- Spouse: Nancy Gardner Powlison (m. late 1970s–2019)
- Children: Three

David Arthur Powlison (December 14, 1949 – June 7, 2019) was an American Christian counselor, theologian, and author. An important leader in the biblical counseling movement, he worked for decades at the Christian Counseling and Educational Foundation (CCEF) and taught at Westminster Theological Seminary.

== Early life and education ==
David Powlison was born in Honolulu, Hawaii, to Peter and Dora "Dodie" Powlison. His father, a history teacher and decorated swimmer, taught at Punahou School, where David also studied. Growing up in a multicultural environment, Powlison later reflected on the cultural richness of Honolulu, describing it as both “Asiacentric” and “Eurocentric.”

After graduating from Punahou School in 1967, Powlison attended Harvard College, earning a degree in social relations in 1971. While at Harvard, he was a letter-winning swimmer and became involved in student activism, the countercultural movement, and various philosophical and religious explorations.

== Conversion and theological formation ==
Though raised in a liberal mainline church, Powlison became disillusioned with Christianity in his youth. His spiritual transformation began through a long-standing conversation with his college roommate, Bob Kramer. In 1975, at the age of 25, he experienced a radical Christian conversion that he described as a “my-whole-life-passing-before-my-eyes moment.”

Soon after, he enrolled at Westminster Theological Seminary in Glenside, Pennsylvania, where he earned his Master of Divinity in 1980. He later completed both an M.A. (1986) and Ph.D. (1996) at the University of Pennsylvania, focusing on the history of science and medicine. His dissertation, Competent to Counsel?, examined the anti-psychiatry movement among conservative Protestants and was later published as The Biblical Counseling Movement: History and Context.

== Career and counseling philosophy ==
In 1980, Powlison joined the Christian Counseling and Educational Foundation in Philadelphia as a writer, counselor, and editor, becoming a prominent voice in the biblical counseling movement. He was also a faculty member at Westminster Theological Seminary, and was editor of the Journal of Biblical Counseling.

Powlison advocated an approach to biblical counseling that differed in some respects from the more confrontational model associated with Jay Adams. He engaged with psychological theories while maintaining that Scripture should provide the primary framework for Christian counseling.

== Publications ==
- Power Encounters: Reclaiming Spiritual Warfare (Baker Books, 1995).
- Seeing with New Eyes: Counseling and the Human Condition through the Lens of Scripture (P&R Publishing, 2003).
- Speaking Truth in Love: Counsel in Community (New Growth Press, 2005).
- The Biblical Counseling Movement: History and Context (New Growth Press, 2010).
- Good and Angry: Redeeming Anger, Irritation, Complaining, and Bitterness (New Growth Press, 2016).
- How Does Sanctification Work? (Crossway, 2017).
- Making All Things New: Restoring Joy to the Sexually Broken (Crossway, 2017).
- God’s Grace in Your Suffering (Crossway, 2018).
- Safe and Sound: Standing Firm in Spiritual Battles (New Growth Press, 2019).
- The Pastor As Counselor: The Call for Soul Care (Crossway, 2021).
- Take Heart: Daily Devotions to Deepen your Faith (New Growth Press, 2022 - drawn from previous teaching, writing and speaking).
- Take Heart for Teens: Daily Devotions to Deepen Your Faith (New Growth Press, 2025 - drawn from previous teaching, writing and speaking)

With Joe Hox as co-author, Powlison also published several children's books, including Zoe’s Hiding Place: When You Are Anxious; Jax’s Tail Twitches: When You Are Angry; Gus Loses His Grip: When You Want Something Too Much; and Buster Tries to Bail: When You Are Stressed.

Powlison also wrote many short pamphlets that are still available in print and online, including Overcoming Anxiety: Relief for Worried People; Sexual Assault: Healing Steps for Victims; Facing Death with Hope: Living for What Lasts; and Breaking the Addictive Cycle: Deadly Obsessions or Simple Pleasures?

== Personal life and death ==
Powlison met his wife, Nancy Gardner, shortly after his conversion, and they married in the late 1970s. The couple had three children. He died at his home in Glenside, Pennsylvania, on June 7, 2019, after a battle with pancreatic cancer.
