= Nouthetic counseling =

Form of Christian pastoral counseling

Nouthetic counseling (Greek: noutheteo, 'to admonish') is a form of evangelical Protestant pastoral counseling based upon conservative evangelical interpretation of the Bible. It repudiates mainstream psychology and psychiatry as humanistic, fundamentally opposed to Christianity, and radically secular. Its viewpoint was originally articulated by American author and preacher Jay E. Adams, in Competent to Counsel (1970) and further books. A number of organizations and seminary courses promoting it have been established since that period of time. The viewpoint is opposed to those seeking to synthesize Christianity with secular psychological thought.

Since 1993, the movement has renamed itself as biblical counseling to emphasize its central focus on the Bible. The Baker Encyclopedia of Psychology and Counseling states that "The aim of Nouthetic Counseling is to effect change in the counselee by encouraging greater conformity to the principles of Scripture."

== Organizations ==
The Christian Counseling and Education Foundation (CCEF) was founded in 1968 by Jay Adams and John Bettler. Alasdair Groves is the current executive director.

Jay Adams founded the Association of Certified Biblical Counselors (ACBC) in 1976 (originally named the National Association of Nouthetic Counselors or NANC). The current executive director of ACBC is Dale Johnson. At the end of 2022, there were nearly 1,700 ACBC-certified biblical counselors listed worldwide. Numerous other biblical counseling organizations exist in the United States, including:

- Association of Biblical Counselors
- Biblical Counseling Coalition
- Faith Biblical Counseling
- Institute for Biblical Counseling and Discipleship
- International Association of Biblical Counselors
- Institute for Nouthetic Studies, founded by Jay E. Adams
- Overseas Instruction in Counseling

There are also many biblical counseling organizations that were created outside the United States.

== Debate within the Christian community ==
Nouthetic counseling has been criticized as narrowly conceived, with a confrontational focus upon sin and behavior. Critics believe that it fails to deal adequately with emotion, grief, and suffering, and that it lacks understanding of complex human motivations.

Clinton and Ohlschlager describe what they call the historic debate between nouthetic counselors and integrationists. Nouthetic counselors, they say, argue that truth can only be known as revealed in the Scriptures. According to an article published by the Spring Christian Counseling Center, secular counseling and psychology are primarily pseudosciences which only can be transformed into "true" sciences within the framework of faith-based Christian dialog.

Integrationists argue that God reveals his truth universally. This includes general revelation, or what they define as truth known by scientific investigation, as well as truth known by special revelation in Christ. Clinton and Ohlschlager express their belief that "shrill criticism and rancorous debate" are ill-suited to the mission of uplifting Christ as the model for counseling.

Larry Crabb, a Christian counselor and psychologist, and leading proponent of the rival "community model", states that Adams compares behavior patterns "with his understanding of biblical behavior patterns, and commands change". Crabb agrees with Adams that obedience to God's commands is "absolutely necessary for effective Christian living", but takes issue with what he sees as Adams' apparent belief that this is the "single key ingredient for spiritual growth". Crabb believes that this neglects what he refers to as the "'insides' of the behaving person", particularly "the person's assumption system and his evaluation of situations based on his assumptions".

Christians also debate the causes of mental illness and the extent of demonic influence on counselees. Three different views as to the origin of mental illness emphasize respectively:

1. disease occurring in the natural realm,
2. habitual sin, and/or
3. influence by "demonic forces"

Furthermore, "[i]n the counseling field, many nouthetic counselors have said that Satan and his demons were bound, bruised, curtailed and restrained at the time of Christ's death and resurrection. They assert that human beings today primarily struggle with their own sin natures rather than directly with Satan and his emissaries."

== Relationship to contemporary psychology ==
Eric Johnson points out that nouthetic counseling has tended to be "very skeptical of contemporary psychology" and "the efforts of integrationist Christians who seek to combine their faith with that psychology." On page 800, the Baker Encyclopedia of Psychology and Counseling describes nouthetic counselors as "zealous to return God and the Bible to positions of authority in the hearts and lives of people", and criticises them as "failing to see the validity in alternative approaches". Donn Arms, a nouthetic counselor and associate of Jay E. Adams, wrote a response to the Encyclopedia's criticism.

Nouthetic counseling has been criticized for the way its "rational and certain approach can come across as impersonal, emotionally distant, and insensitive."

Nouthetic counseling is viewed as highly controversial by secular psychologists who believe that it is unethical to counsel that the Bible has the answers for all people of all backgrounds.

Loren Townsend of Louisville Presbyterian Theological Seminary believes that nouthetic counseling can harm patients. In addition to techniques that critics consider ineffective, patients who are not helped by nouthetic counseling often consider themselves to be "unfaithful" or religious failures.

== See also ==
- Christian counseling
- Christian fundamentalism
- Christian psychology
- Psychology of religion
- Theophostic Prayer Ministry
