= Larry Crabb =

American psychologist and author (1944–2021)

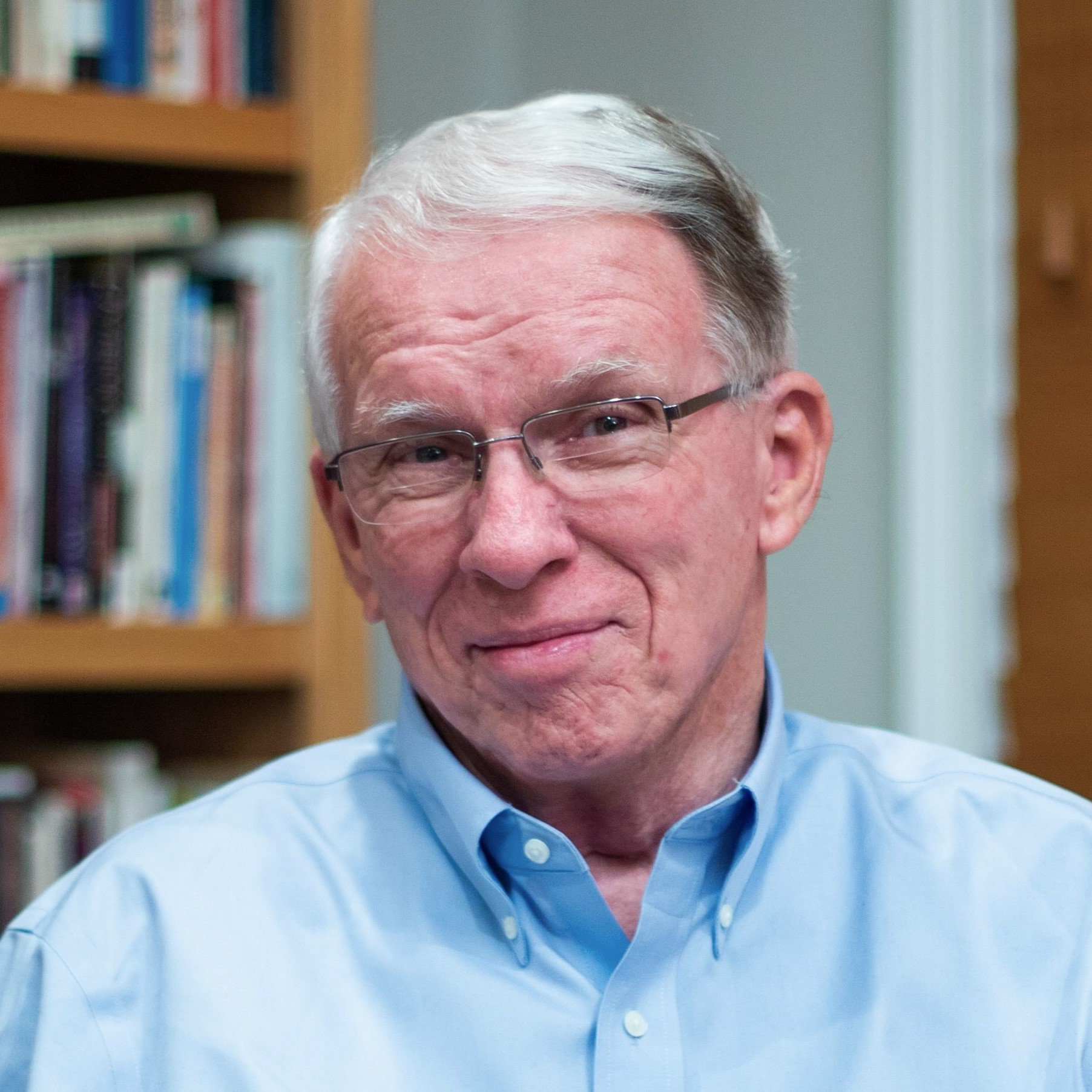
- Born: July 13, 1944; Evanston, Illinois, U.S.
- Died: February 28, 2021 (aged 76); Lakewood, Colorado, U.S.
- Occupation: Christian author

Lawrence J. Crabb Jr. (July 13, 1944 – February 28, 2021) was an American Christian counselor, author, Bible teacher, spiritual director, and seminar speaker. Crabb wrote several best-selling books and was the founder and director of New Way Ministries and co-founder of his legacy ministry, Larger Story. He served as a Spiritual Director for the American Association of Christian Counselors and taught at several different Christian colleges, including Colorado Christian University.

== Early life and education ==
Crabb was born in Evanston, Illinois, United States, in 1944. He graduated from Ursinus College with a B.A. and the University of Illinois, Champaign-Urbana with an M.A. and Ph.D. in clinical psychology. During graduate school he experienced a period of deep skepticism before being guided back to the faith by Francis Schaeffer and C. S. Lewis. His renewed spiritual passion convinced him that Christianity had a role to play in clinical psychology.

== Career ==
Crabb's first books were Basic Principles of Biblical Counseling (Zondervan, 1975) and Effective Biblical Counseling (Zondervan, 1977). He went on to write over 40 books; some of his more well-known ones include The Silence of Adam, Inside Out, Finding God, Connecting and Men & Women: Enjoying the Difference.

He founded the Institute of Biblical Counseling in the early 1980s while on the faculty of Grace Theological Seminary (1982–1989). The institute has since been replaced with the School of Behavioral Sciences. Out of his book Shattered Dreams (WaterBrook, 2001), based on Naomi's journey described in the Book of Ruth, New Way Ministries (the "new way" from Romans 7:6) was established in 2001.

Crabb was adjunct professor of Applied Theology at Regent College from 1998 to 1999; chairman and Professor, Master of Arts in Biblical Counseling Program, Colorado Christian University, 1989–1996; chairman and Professor, Graduate Department of Biblical Counseling, Grace Theological Seminary, 1982–1989; and in private practice for Clinical Psychology in Boca Raton, Florida, 1973–1982. He was also the lone psychologist at the Psychological Counseling Center, Florida Atlantic University; Assistant Professor, Psychology Department, 1971–1973; and assistant professor, Psychology, University of Illinois Staff Psychologist, Student Counseling Center, University of Illinois, 1970–1971. He received Teacher of the Year Award in the Psychology Department in 1971.

== Biblical counseling ==
The book Basic Principles of Biblical Counseling (1975) gives Crabb's views of the shortcomings of five varieties of "secular" counseling, suggests the causes and structure of mental problems, and gives a Bible-centered approach to counseling.

In the chapter "Floating Anchors", Crabb describes the views of Sigmund Freud, "Ego Psychology", Carl Rogers, B. F. Skinner, and "Existentialism" (Viktor Frankl) on the causes and structure of mental problems, and he finds each wanting. Each offers insights, but none reflects the Christian view that man is created in the image of God, yet fallen in sin.

In the chapter "An Aerial View", Crabb previews his theory: "negative (sinful) feelings" are a result of "negative (sinful) behavior", which is in turn a result of "wrong (sinful) thinking." Repentance is a turn to "right thinking", which necessarily brings "right behavior" and "satisfying feelings".

In the two chapters "Understanding Our Deepest Needs", Crabb identifies our "deepest personal needs" as "significance" and "security".

In the chapter "Where Problems Start", Crabb argues that ". . . resentment, guilt and anxiety seem to be the three central underlying disorders in all personal problems and they exist because we think incorrect thoughts".

In the chapter "Weaving Tangled Webs", Crabb presents case studies to "see how a counselor, armed with these fundamental ideas, can understand the confusing array of problems confronting him in his office".

In the chapter "Hold Your Client Responsible: For What?", Crabb emphasizes the client's need to take personal responsibility for changing his thoughts not just cognitively, but existentially, "dying to the sinful pattern of thinking".

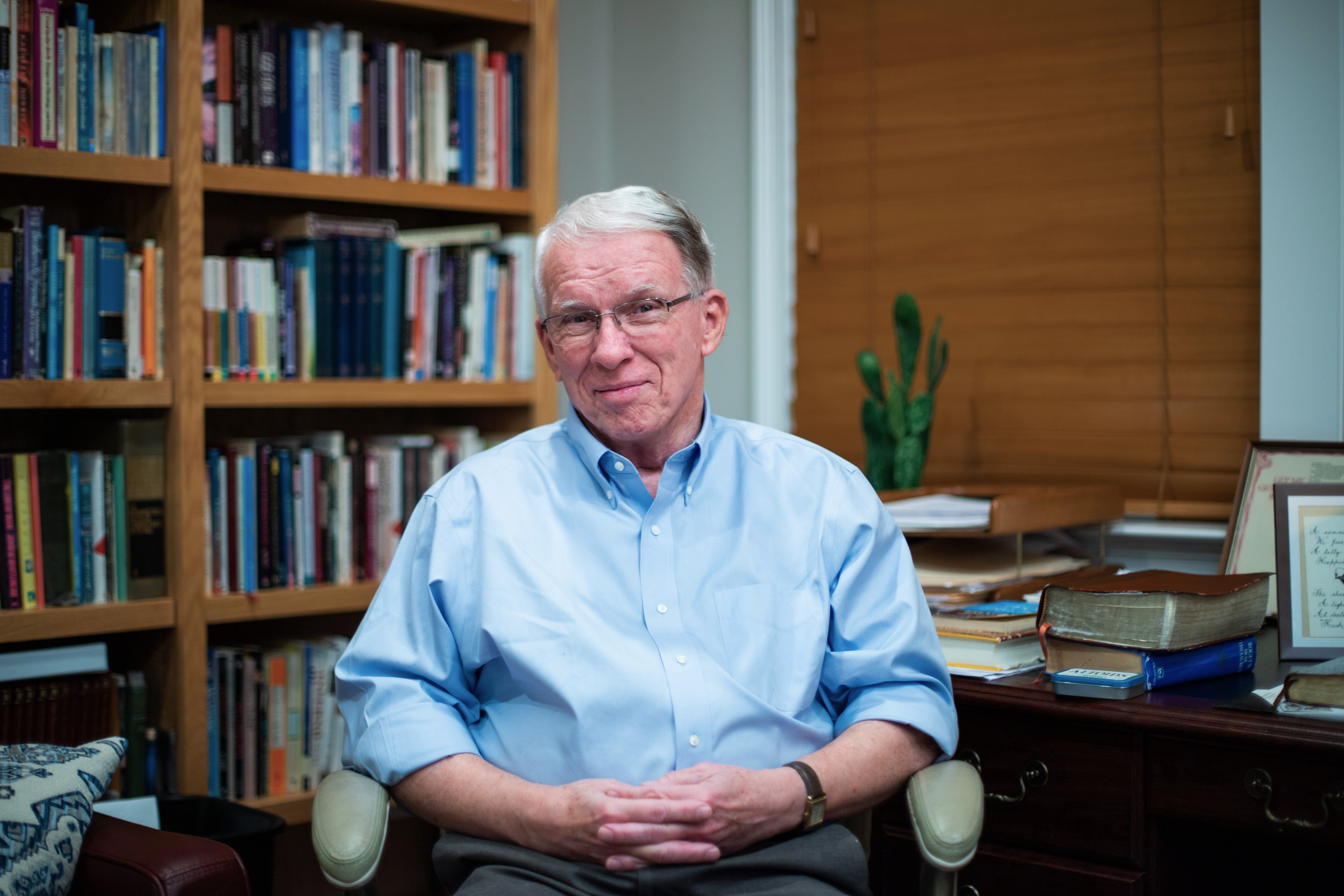
Dr. Larry Crabb at his desk in his home office.

In the chapter "The Mood And Goal of Counseling", Crabb argues that secular psychologists cannot give suffering evangelicals the help they need, because "[t]he goal of the biblical counselor is to assist a person to change in the direction of Christlikeness".

Throughout the book, Crabb rejects the concept of mental illness, stating that mental disorders are a result of a sinful attitude toward God, and can be healed only through confession, remorse, and repentance. He discusses divorce and homosexuality as sinful actions, while emphasizing that any thought or behavior that separates a person from God is a sin. The husband must be head of the household, the wife must submit to him. This submission, however, entails the Christ-like submission that Jesus showed to the Father by coming to Earth in human form.

== Personal life and death ==
He was married to Rachael Crabb for many years, and had two sons. He died on February 28, 2021.

== Legacy ==
The Larry J. Crabb Center for University Counseling at Colorado Christian University was named after him and dedicated in 2018.

== Qualifications ==
- Ph.D. Clinical Psychology, University of Illinois, 1970 (Minors: Speech Therapy and Philosophy of Science)
- M.A. Clinical Psychology, University of Illinois, 1969
- B.S. Psychology, Ursinus College, 1965

== Works ==
- Crabb, Lawrence J. (1982). The Marriage Builder: A Blueprint for Couples and Counselors. Grand Rapids, MI: Zondervan. ISBN 978-0-310-22580-5. OCLC 8763374.
- ——— (1977). Effective Biblical Counseling: A Model for Helping Caring Christians Become Capable Counselors. Grand Rapids, MI: Zondervan. ISBN 978-0-310-22570-6. OCLC 2818305.
- ——— (1975). Basic Principles of Biblical Counseling: Meeting Counseling Needs Through the Local Church. Grand Rapids, MI: Zondervan. ISBN 978-0-310-22560-7. OCLC 1991950.
- ———; Allender, Dan B. (1984). Encouragement: the key to caring. Grand Rapids, MI: Zondervan. ISBN 978-0-310-22590-4. OCLC 10457370.
- ——— (1987). Understanding People: Satisfying the Deepest Human Longings Through Biblical Counselling. Grand Rapids, MI: Ministry Resources Library. ISBN 978-0-310-22600-0. OCLC 15790813.
- ——— (1988). Inside Out: Real Change Is Possible If You're Willing to Start from The... Colorado Springs, CO: Navpress Publishing Group. ISBN 978-0-891-09196-7.
- ——— (1991). Men & Women: Enjoying the Difference. Grand Rapids, MI: Zondervan. ISBN 978-0-310-33830-7. OCLC 22891442.
- ——— (1993). Finding God. Grand Rapids, MI: Zondervan. ISBN 978-0-310-59430-7.
- ———; Hudson, Don; Andrews, Al (1995). The Silence of Adam: Becoming Men of Courage in a World of Chaos. Grand Rapids, MI: Zondervan. ISBN 978-0-310-48530-8.
- ——— (1997). Connecting: Healing for Ourselves and Our Relationships. Nashville, TN: Word Publishing. ISBN 978-0-849-91413-3. OCLC 37260988.
- ——— (1997). Understanding Who You Are: What Your Relationships Tell You about Yourself. Colorado Springs, CO: Navpress Publishing Group. ISBN 978-157683014-7.
- ——— (1998). Bring Home the Joy. Grand Rapids, MI: Zondervan. ISBN 978-0-310-22786-1. OCLC 39532840.
- ——— (1999). The Safest Place on Earth. Nashville, TN: Word Publishing. ISBN 978-0-849-91456-0. OCLC 41977144.
- ———; Allender, Dan B. (1999). Hope When You're Hurting: answers to four questions hurting people ask. New York: Walker & Co. ISBN 978-0-802-72744-2. OCLC 41387608.
- ——— (2001). Shattered Dreams: God's unexpected pathway to joy. Colorado Springs, CO: WaterBrook Press. ISBN 978-1-578-56452-1. OCLC 45466122.
- ——— (2002). The Pressure's Off: there's a new way to live. Colorado Springs, CO: WaterBrook Press. ISBN 978-1-578-56453-8. OCLC 49587560.
- ——— (2003). Soultalk : The language God longs for us to speak. Nashville, TN: Integrity Publishers. ISBN 978-1-591-45039-9. OCLC 52554062.
- ——— (2006). The Papa Prayer. Nashville, TN: Integrity Publishers. ISBN 978-1-591-45424-3. OCLC 62324609.
- ——— (2007). Becoming a True Spiritual Community: A Profound Vision of What the Church Can Be. Nashville, TN: Thomas Nelson. ISBN 978-0-849-91884-1.
- ——— (2009). 66 Love Letters: a conversation with God that invites you into His story. Nashville, TN: Thomas Nelson. ISBN 978-0-849-91966-4. OCLC 422764591.
- ——— (2009). Real Church: does it exist? can I find it?. Nashville, TN: Thomas Nelson. ISBN 978-0-785-22920-9. OCLC 268791008.
- ——— (2013). Fully Alive: A Biblical Vision of Gender that Frees Men and Women to Live Beyond Stereotypes. Grand Rapids, MI: Baker Books. ISBN 978-0-801-01530-4. OCLC 827115227.
- ——— (2013). Understanding People: Why We Long for Relationship. Grand Rapids, MI: Zondervan. ISBN 978-0-310-33607-5.
- ——— (2013). Encouragement: The Unexpected Power of Building Others Up. Grand Rapids, MI: Zondervan. ISBN 978-0-310-33689-1.
- ——— (2016). A Different Kind of Happiness: Discovering the Joy That Comes from Sacrificial Love. Grand Rapids, MI: Baker Books. ISBN 978-0-801-01531-1.
- ——— (2018). When God's Ways Make No Sense. Grand Rapids, MI: Baker Books. ISBN 978-0-801-01532-8.
- ——— (2020). Waiting for Heaven: Freedom from the Incurable Addiction to Self. Larger Story Press. ISBN 9781734735000.
