= Palo Verde, Arizona =

- Populated place
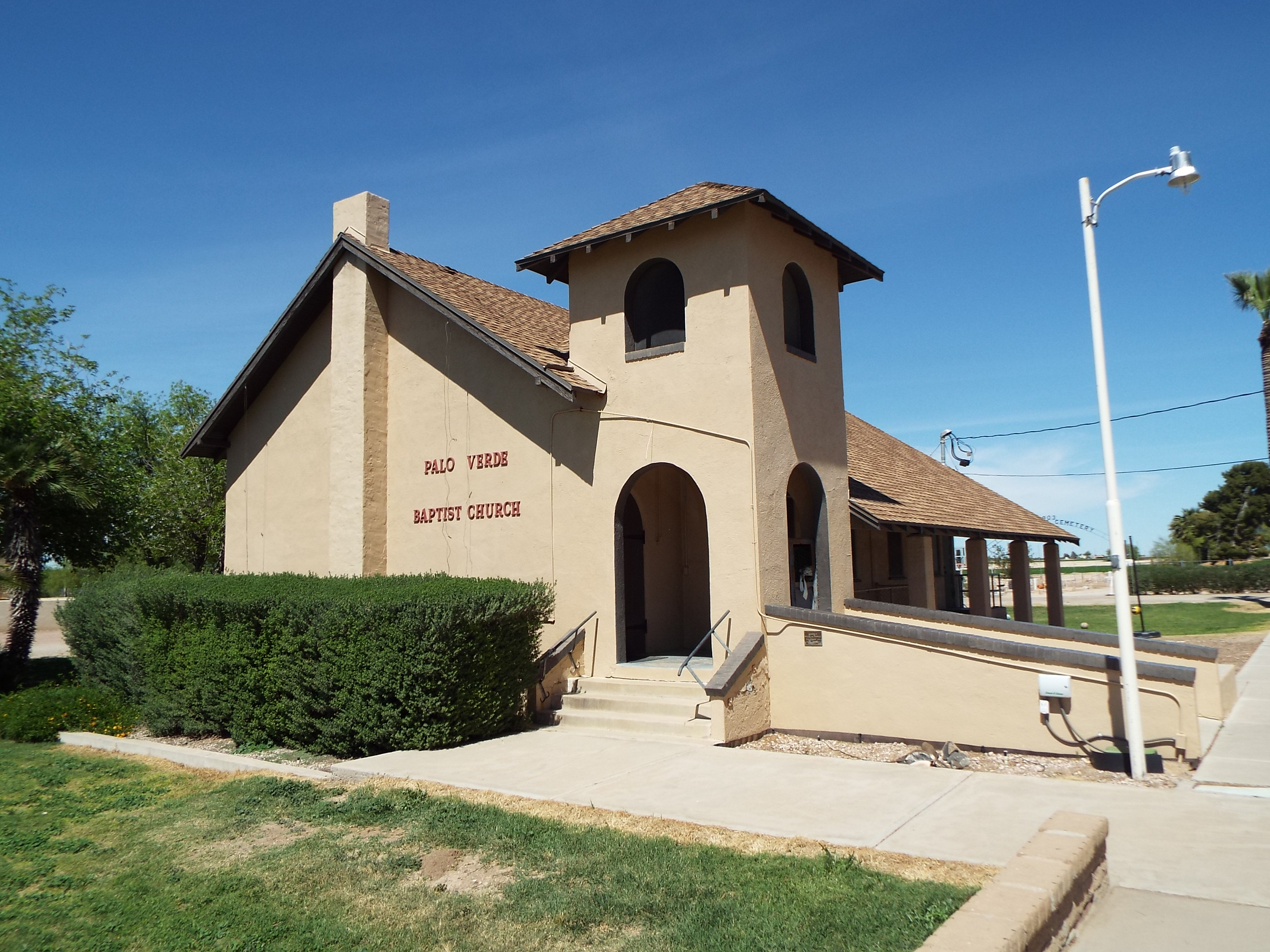
- The Palo Verde Baptist Church was built in 1890 and is located on 29600 West Old Hwy. 80.

- Location in Maricopa County and the state of Arizona
- Coordinates: 33°20′53″N 112°40′39″W
- Country: United States
- State: Arizona
- County: Maricopa
- Elevation: 845 ft (258 m)
- Time zone: UTC-7 (Mountain (MST))
- ZIP code: 85343
- Area code: 623

Palo Verde is a small populated place in Maricopa County, Arizona, United States. It is located about 40 miles (64 km) west of Phoenix, and 6 miles (9.7 km) southwest of downtown Buckeye on Historic U.S. Route 80.

== Brief history ==
The Palo Verde area was settled in 1886, by John G. Roberts and family. Mr. Roberts helped in the construction of the Arizona and Buckeye canals, served a term as cattle inspector, and was deputy sheriff at Buckeye under three Maricopa County sheriffs. One of the first structures built, which still stands, was the Palo Verde Baptist Church, organized in 1890.

Despite sharing a name, the Palo Verde Nuclear Generating Station is located in nearby Wintersburg.

Palo Verde exists as a county island within the planning boundary of Buckeye. This precludes any possibility of incorporation for the community, but annexation into Buckeye is a possibility.

In 1995, a train derailment occurred near the town of Palo Verde.

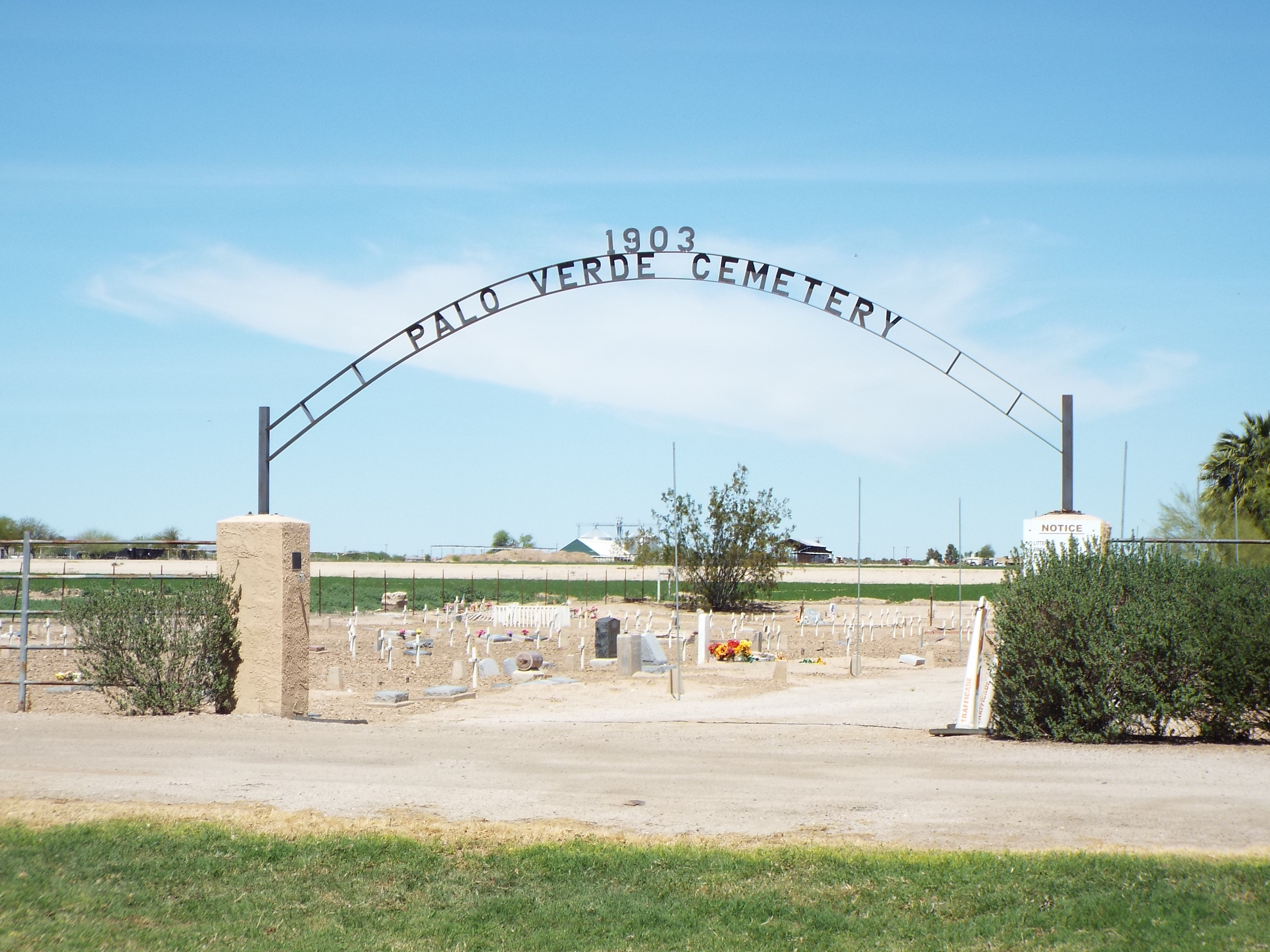
The Palo Verde Cemetery was established in 1903 and is located on 29600 West Old Hwy. 80.

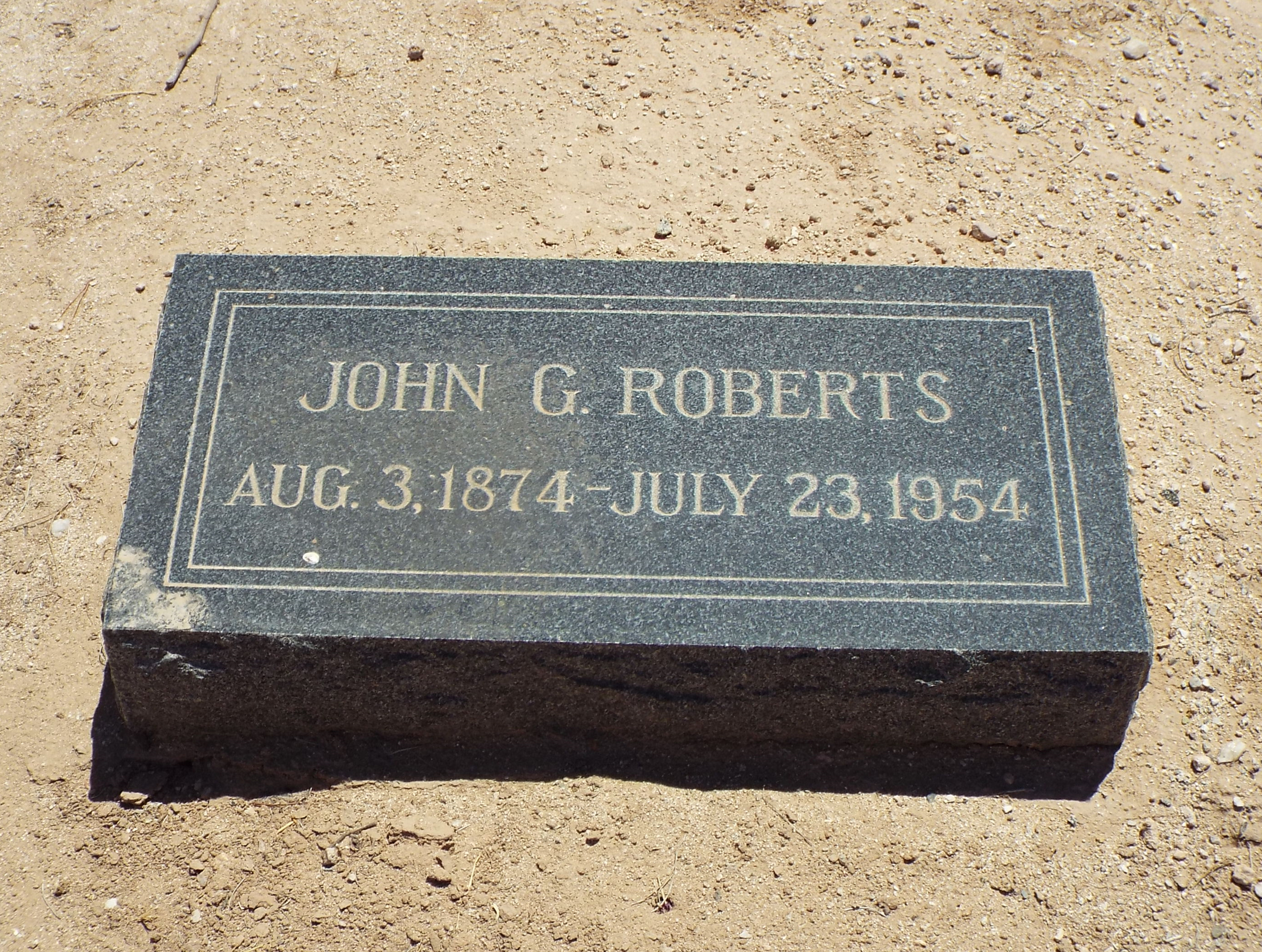
Grave of John G. Roberts (1874–1954), founder of Palo Verde
