= Ruth Narramore =

American poet

Ruth Elliott Narramore
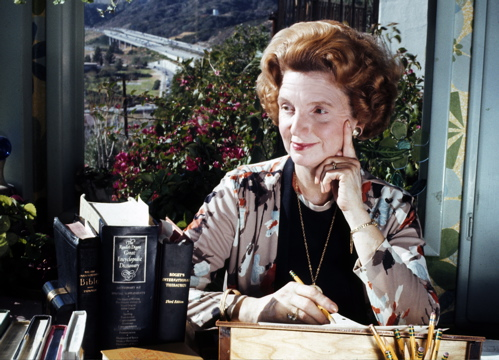
- Born: Ruth Elliott; August 23, 1923; Brooklyn, New York
- Died: May 30, 2010 (aged 86); Pasadena, California
- Occupations: Poet; radio broadcaster; musician
- Spouse: Clyde M. Narramore
- Children: Melodie Narramore Yocum; Dr. Kevin Narramore

Ruth Elliott Narramore (August 23, 1923 – May 30, 2010) was the editor of the Angel award-winning Psychology For Living Magazine from 1982 to 1999. Before then she co-wrote and edited books for her husband, Dr. Clyde Narramore. Earlier, she conducted and wrote instrumental arrangements for the orchestra at the Eagle Rock Baptist Church in Los Angeles. Prior to that, she was a trumpeter and vocalist for Jack Wyrtzen's traveling music group at Word of Life in Schroon Lake, New York.

Ruth was the sister of Dr. Rev. Gordon Elliott, a career minister and professor at the Fruitland Baptist Bible Institute in Hendersonville, North Carolina. For 64 years she was married to pioneering Christian psychologist Dr. Clyde M. Narramore. The Narramores had two children, Melodie and Kevin. Melodie was a Gospel recording artist with the Bread 'N Honey Music Label and was the Director of Theater Arts at California Baptist University until her death in 2007. Kevin, a musician, behavioral scientist, author and medical researcher directs the Narramore Institute in Los Angeles. In the 1950s, Clyde and Ruth created the Narramore Christian Foundation and the international radio broadcast Psychology for Living.

In addition to co-authoring several books with her husband, Ruth Narramore wrote poetry throughout her life. Influenced by the style of Ogden Nash, Ruth's poetry collection Come Share My Joy blends a whimsical Joie de vivre with heartfelt spiritual and existential reflection.

== Early life ==
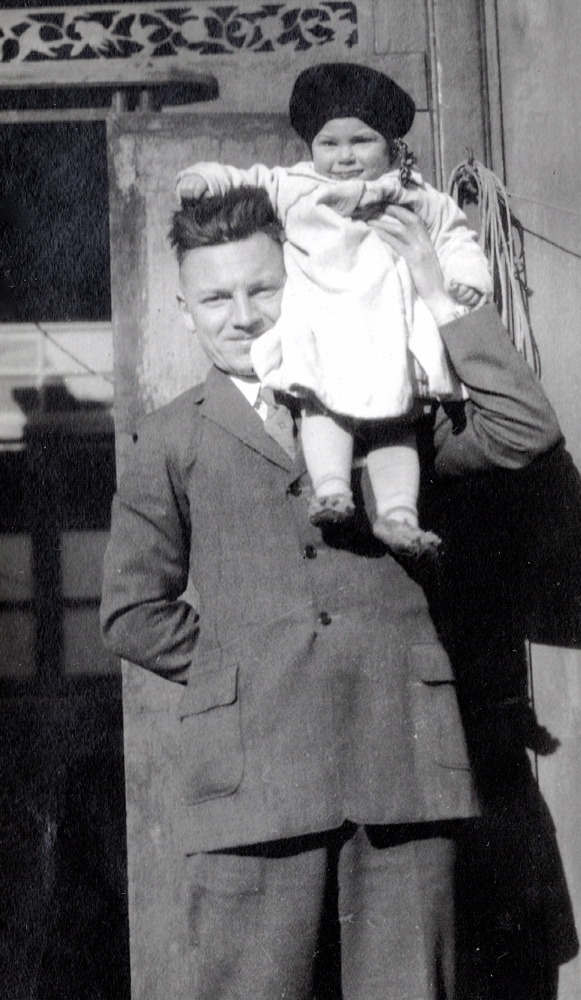
Ruth Narramore with her father, Edwin Elliott, near Tianjin, China.

Six months after her birth in Brooklyn, New York, Ruth and her missionary parents, Edwin and Alice Elliott, ventured across the pacific on the Canadian ocean liner, the RMS Empress of Asia arriving in Tianjin, China. At age two, Ruth was speaking both Mandarin Chinese and English. Her best friends were Chinese even though they referred to her as a "Little Foreign Devil". Growing up in China, Ruth Elliott observed her father as he designed and built everything from prosthetic limbs for the handicapped to church structures. Her sister, Winnifred, was born in China but died at the age of three. Here, the Elliotts learned to sacrifice for a greater cause as her parents had dedicated their lives to helping the Chinese people.

As the Japanese moved into China in the thirties, foreign consulates urged their citizens to leave the country, since their safety could no longer be guaranteed. As a result, her family returned to New York, where her brother, Gordon Elliott, was born. In the New York City School system Ruth's creative talents clearly emerged as she began to win citywide awards for her artwork.

Ruth attended King's College, and received her master's degree in music education from Columbia University. The list of musical instruments that she since learned to play included: trumpet, piano, organ, harp, vibraharp, cello, Swiss bells and alpenhorn. During WWII Ruth met a young Naval officer, Clyde M. Narramore at a Jack Wyrtzen rally at Times Square in New York City. They dated and were married in 1946 in Manhattan, NY.

== Poetry ==
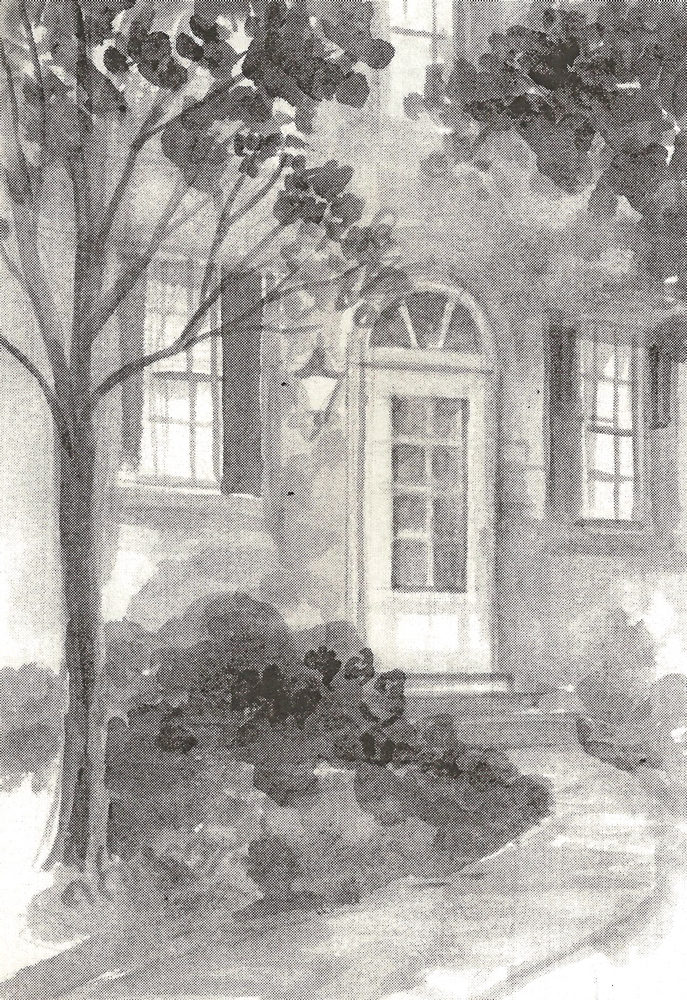
My Home illustration by Freiman Stoltzfus

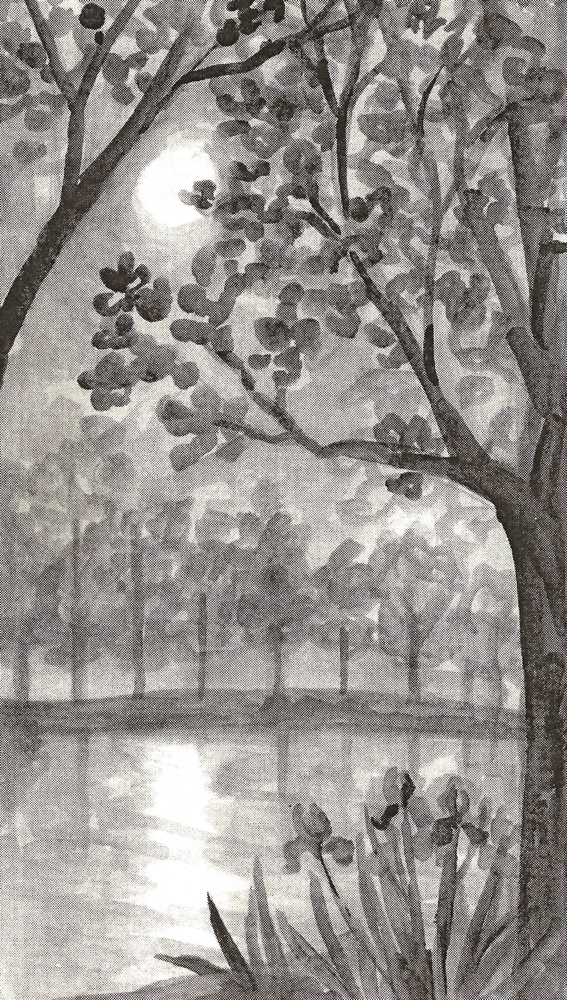
Moonlight illustration by Freiman Stoltzfus

Ruth Elliott Narramore's poetry was known for its clever wit, heartfelt warmth and keen insights and observations into life, family and faith.

In Come Share My Joy, Narramore authored a collection of 77 poems on the wonder of growing up, family, motherhood, faith, and comfort. Her stories always affirmed God's unconditional love and wisdom. The book includes 23 art illustrations from artist, Freiman Stoltzfus, known for his Amish-Mennonite influences.

In the book, her poems are divided into seven areas of life:

1. Home and Family
2. Friendships and Relationships
3. Christmas and Easter
4. Daily Living
5. Our Relationship to God
6. The World Around Us
7. Just For Fun

Lost Identity

To Have to be what I am not
Is much too hard for me.
Pretending to be someone else
I wasn't meant to be
Is not a role for simple folk
Like me, who cannot see
A whit of benefit derived

From lost identity!

God Knows My Heart

God knows my heart--
From Him I cannot hide
One secret small.
Before Him, all
My thoughts are open wide.

God knows my heart--
When others cannot know
The pain I bear,
Or seem to care--
God understands my woe.

God knows my heart--
And sees my every flaw;
Yet loves me still
And always will,
Supplanting grace for law.

God knows my heart--
Far better than I do
Then so I must
My Savior trust,

If my heart would be true!

Ask Me Not to Write a Poem

"Please write a poem for Mother's Day,"
Asked Mrs. Thus-and-so.
I tried – I toiled – I labored on
But words refused to flow!

I struggled to write something down--
'Twas maundlin and 'twas trite.
I wore a dozen pencils out,
But nothing came out right.

The topic wasn't what was wrong:
(The books are on my shelf).
It's hard to pen a mother's praise
When I am one myself.

I'm surely not the heroine
A poem would make of me,
And many mothers have their flaws
If truth be known – and free.

Yet motherhood I do adore,
And I, for one, am for it.
But ask me not to write a poem.

Good heavens, I deplore it!
