= Perry London =

American psychologist (1931–1992)

Perry London (June 18, 1931 – June 19, 1992) was an American–Israeli psychologist, theorist, and academic administrator best known for his writings on clinical psychology and his studies about altruism and hypnosis. In his last position, he was a professor of psychology and dean of the graduate school of applied and professional psychology at Rutgers University.

== Early life and education ==
Perry London was born on June 18, 1931, to a Jewish family in Omaha, Nebraska. His parents, Max London (formerly Ladizhinski) and Rose Novoselsky London, immigrated from Russia in the early 20th century. He had two older sisters and one younger sister. After two years of public high school in Omaha, he moved to Yeshiva University High School in New York, where he graduated in 1948. During his Senior year in high school, he wrote his first academic article, which earned him a full college scholarship. Consequently, the article was published in a peer-reviewed academic journal. In 1952 he graduated from Yeshiva College. He later earned a master's degree in psychology at Teachers College, Columbia University in 1953 and a PhD in 1956. He interned in 1954–1955 at Walter Reed Army Hospital in Washington, D.C.

== Career ==
After three years at Madigan Army Hospital in Tacoma, Washington, London joined the faculty of the department of Psychology at the University of Illinois, moving four years later to the University of Southern California (USC), where he was appointed Head of the Psychological Research and Training Institute. During that time he joined NASA's space program as a consultant and helped screen the first cohort of American astronauts sent to space. After five years in that job, he was invited to the Hebrew University of Jerusalem as a Visiting Professor for the purpose of designing the research program for the newly created NCJW Center of Innovation in Education. During that year (1968–69) he was awarded a National Institute of Mental Health (NIMH) five-year Career Development Fellowship for promising young researchers, which freed him from all teaching and administrative responsibilities, enabling him and his family to divide their time between the US and Israel. London went back full time to USC in 1973 and moved to Israel in 1979, where he received teaching positions at Hebrew University and Tel Aviv University. During that period he also served as a consultant to the Israeli Air Force. He moved back to the US in 1983, becoming the director of the counseling and consulting psychology program at Harvard University. In 1989, Prof. London responded to the call of the faculty of the Graduate School of Applied and Professional Psychology at Rutgers University and served as its Dean until his death in 1992.

== Research ==
London published more than 150 articles and books on a range of subjects, comprising an ample intellectual heritage in clinical psychology as a theorist, empirical scientist, and teacher. His Modes and Morals of Psychotherapy (1964/1986) was the first cognitive account of the behavior therapies and remains a foundational text for modern students of the technologies and ethical implications of clinical psychology. In it London showed how therapeutic variety was essential to the field and not a "childhood disease" that would be overcome once one theory and approach was ultimately validated by research and came out victorious over all others. He was one of the first analysts of the therapeutic scene who argued that the most basic characteristic of a therapist might not be their theoretical allegiance, but their moral, interpersonal and existential stance. Later, London wrote and co-authored several articles (London, 1970, Omer & London 1988, 1989) describing how the field developed beyond its early focus on establishing which theory and therapy approach were true and right, into an understanding that theoretical ideologies and all-embracing theories were inadequate to explain therapeutic success. He showed how the field shifted its focus from theoretical purity to pragmatics, seeking to identify common factors that explained the effectiveness of different and even contrasting approaches, and special moments of change that could occur in similar ways in highly different kinds of therapy.

Behavior Control (1969) elaborated those themes. His Beginning Psychology (1975) was a highly accessible invitation to psychology, serving as an introductory text book. His writing was characterized by a conceptual perspective and an elegance of prose that made it memorable.

In his The Children's Hypnotic Susceptibility Scale (1963), London showed that hypnotibility is an individual characteristic, present in different people in different degrees. His scale enables therapists to identify who can benefit from hypnotherapy to treat pain, improve health and reduce anxiety.

At a time when self-reward was the leitmotif in psychology, London was a pioneer in the study of Christians who had risked their lives to save others—Jews, Gypsies, and American servicemen – during World War II. These rescuers endangered themselves, and often also their families including children, in many cases to save the lives of complete strangers. They hid them in basements and rooms behind walls and helped them escape to safer areas. London and his associates found that rescuers were often adventurous people, which helped them have the courage required for action. They were often marginal to their community, different from the people in the community in some way. They may have had one foreign parent, or were Catholics in a Protestant community, or had a personal characteristic that made them somewhat different (London, 1970). This does not mean that they were disconnected from other people, but this marginality enabled them to have a separate perspective.

When their community supported the Nazi persecution of Jews, they did not. One famous rescuer, Oscar Schindler, was marginal in that he was a German who lived in Czechoslovakia, a Protestant who married a Catholic woman from another village. Raoul Wallenberg, a Swedish diplomat who saved the lives of many Jews in Hungary, was marginal in that he was a member of a poor branch of a very rich family (Staub, 1989, 2015).

London and his associates could not continue their work, because no funding organization was willing to support them. They were told in the early 1960s that too much time had passed to get reliable information. However, the subsequent development of Holocaust studies would suggest that people at that time, including funders, were not yet ready to look at the horrors of that period. Indeed, much later, starting in the 1980s, a number of important articles and books appeared with the in-depth study of rescuers (for example, Oliner and Oliner, 1998).

London's concern with the rescuers in the Holocaust led him to focus on the development of the willingness for altruistic and self-sacrificing behaviors in children. His research on this issue (Bryan and London, 1970) found that altruism and self-sacrifice seemed to develop independently of the social reinforcements that the child might receive for such behaviors. The only variable that was consistently found to help foster altruistic tendencies in children was a family atmosphere in which the parents encouraged and modeled the expression of empathic feelings. In contrast, a family atmosphere focusing on success and competition was found to hinder the child's readiness for altruism and self-sacrifice.

In the last decade of his life, London studied and advised Jewish organizations on Jewish identity education, developing some of the principles that would evolve into Birthright, the organization that sponsors free educational trips to Israel for young adults of Jewish heritage.

== Pioneer of gender-neutral writing ==
A gifted writer known for his clear, straightforward, muscular prose, and a scholar with a strong Jewish and classical education, London had a sensitive ear for linguistic nuance and was an early critic of gender-bias in the English language. In an introductory note to his 1975 volume Beginning Psychology, he bluntly announced that he was going to use the gender-neutral "they" as a singular pronoun, whether the publisher or the readers liked it or not. "Some conventions of English grammar do not yet acknowledge women’s equality with men," he wrote. "I wanted to change this without always resorting to second person or third person plural or clumsy singular constructions (“You should watch your grammar"; "people should watch their grammar"; "one should watch his or her grammar"). So I persuaded the Dorsey Press to let me use "their" as both singular and plural, the way it is often used colloquially ("A person should watch their grammar"). I am sorry if this offends grammatical purists, but I think this aspect of the language needs changing badly enough to risk their displeasure. Whether or not you think it a mistake, in any case, know that it is not an accident.”

== Personal life ==
London married Vivian Jacobson after entering graduate school. They had four daughters (Miriam London, Yael London, Shoshana London-Sappir and Debra London) before divorcing in 1977. London later married Beverly Rose. He resided in Edison, New Jersey. He died on June 19, 1992, at the Robert Wood Johnson University Hospital.

== Selected publications ==
- London, P., The Modes and Morals of Psychotherapy, Taylor & Francis, 1964/1986
- London, P. & D. Rosenhan, Foundations of Abnormal Psychology, Holt, Rinehart & Winston Of Canada Ltd, 1968
- London, P., The rescuers: motivational hypotheses about Christians who saved Jews from the Nazis, Academic Press, 1970
- London, P., Behavior Control, Harper & Row, 1971
- London, P., Beginning Psychology, Dorsey Press, 1975
- Rosenhan, D. & P. London (eds.) Theory and research in abnormal psychology, Holt, Rinehart and Winston, 1975
- London, P. et al., The Impact of summer in Israel Programs, Montreal: CRB Foundation, 1987
- London. P., 1959, Effect of differential instructions and anxiety level on discrimination learning. Journal of Genetic Psychology, 95(2), 283–292
- London. P., & Bryan. J., 1960, Theory and research on the clinical use of the Archimedes spiral. Journal of General Psychology, 62(1), 113–125
- Rosenhan, D, & P. London, 1963, Hypnosis: Expectation, susceptibility, and performance. Journal of Abnormal and Social Psychology, 66(1), 77–81
- Cooper, L.M. & London, P., 1966, Sex and hypnotic susceptibility in children. International Journal of Clinical and Experimental Hypnosis, 14(1), 55–60
- London. P., & R. Bower, 1968, Altruism, Extraversion and Mental Illness. The Journal of Social Psychology, 76(1), 19–30
- Bryan. J., & P. London, 1970, Altruistic behavior by children. Psychological Bulletin, 73(3), 200–211
- London, P., 1972, The end of ideology in behavior modification. The American Psychologist, 27(10), 913–920
- Rotenberg, M., London, P. & L. Cooper, 1976, Achievement motivation, socialization, and hypnotic susceptibility among youths from four Israeli subcultures. Journal of Youth and Adolescence, 5(1), 89–100
- • London, P., & N. Frank, 1987, Jewish Identity and Jewish Schooling, Journal of Jewish Communal Affairs, 64: 4–13
- Omer, H., & P. London, 1988, Metamorphosis in psychotherapy: End of the systems era. Psychotherapy, 25(2), 171–184
- Omer, H., & London, P., 1989, Signal and noise in psychotherapy: The role and control of nonspecific factors. British Journal of Psychiatry, 155, 239–245
