= John Townsend (author) =

American Christian self help author, business consultant, and psychologist

- Born: June 1, 1952 (age 74)
- Occupation: Author
- Writing career
- Period: 1992–2018
- Genres: Christian, Self-help
- Subject: Boundaries
- Notable works: Boundaries: When to Say Yes, How to Say No; ISBN 978-0310247456
- Website: townsendnow.com/about/

John Townsend (born June 1, 1952) is an American Christian self-help author, business consultant, and psychologist.

== Biography ==
Townsend holds a Bachelor of Arts degree in psychology with honors from North Carolina State University, a Master of Theology degree with honors from Dallas Theological Seminary, and a PhD degree in clinical psychology from Rosemead School of Psychology at Biola University.

Townsend co-founded (with Henry Cloud) the Minirth-Meier Clinic West and served as its clinical co-director for ten years. The clinic operated treatment centers in 35 cities in the western United States.

In 2015, Townsend also founded the Townsend Institute for Leadership and Counseling, providing graduate training in Organizational Leadership, Executive Coaching and Counseling, based at Concordia University Irvine in California.

Townsend has authored or co-authored a host of best-selling self-help books throughout his extensive career.

== Works ==
Townsend co-authored 26 Christian self-help books during his career, including Boundaries: When to Say Yes, How to Say No to Take Control of Your Life in 1992, which sold two million copies and evolved into a five-part series.

== See also ==
- Henry Cloud
- Personal boundaries
