= Henry Cloud =

American Christian self help author and psychologist (born 1956)

- Born: 1956 (age 69–70)
- Occupation: Author
- Writing career
- Genres: Christian, Self-help
- Subject: Assertiveness
- Notable works: Boundaries: When to Say Yes, How to Say No

Henry Cloud (born 1956) is an American Christian self-help author. Cloud co-authored Boundaries: When to Say Yes, How to Say No to Take Control of Your Life in 1992 which sold two million copies and evolved into a five-part series.

== Education ==
Cloud has a BS in psychology with honors from Southern Methodist University and a PhD in clinical psychology from Biola University (1987). He also took classes from Talbot Theological Seminary.

== Career ==
Cloud is president of Cloud-Townsend Resources and runs a private practice with his business partner, John Townsend in Newport Beach, California. Cloud and Townsend formerly co-directed the Minirth-Meier Clinic West in the same area of Orange County.

== See also ==
- Personal boundaries
