= Christian counseling =

Christian psychology and pastoral counseling

Biblical counseling is distinct from secular counseling. According to the International Association of Biblical Counselors, Biblical counseling "seeks to carefully discover those areas in which a Christian may be disobedient to the principles and commands of Scripture and to help him learn how to lovingly submit to God's will." Biblical Counselors, therefore, approach psychology through the lens of the Bible. They see the Bible as the source of all truth.

Christian counseling on the other hand is conducted by a licensed counselor who integrates spirituality into traditional counseling methods and psychological principles. They may reference scripture but unlike biblical counselors, Christian Therapists do not focus solely on biblical teachings.

== History ==
Christian counseling began between the late 1960s and early 1970s with the Biblical Counseling Movement directed by Jay E. Adams. Adams's 1970 book Competent to Counsel advocated a Christian-based approach which differed from the psychological and psychiatric solutions of the time. As a devout Protestant, Adams believed that it was the job of the church to heal people who he believed were morally corrupt, but labeled by society as mentally ill. He rejected other models of counseling, such as the medical model, which gave clients a medical diagnosis based on a list of their behaviors or actions. Adams believed the lists of maladaptive behaviors listed under each diagnostic category were actually behaviors emanating from our volitional nature, rather than an illness. Maladaptive behaviors, he maintained, are a matter of sin and therefore subject to confrontation and education in God's word, exhorting the client to choose behavior that is obedient to God's word, thus removing the sin in their life. Adams disagreed with any attempt to reclassify behavior that removed people from complete responsibility for their choices.

Adams gained converts but also lost popularity among some groups due to controversies surrounding his approach. Competent to Counsel (1970) introduced his model of Nouthetic counseling, which was rooted in a strict biblical framework and focused on exhorting clients to change their behavior, aligning it with Christian teachings. His model encouraged counselors to use various scriptures to guide clients in their journey toward repentance and spiritual transformation. The term "nouthetic" derives from the Greek word noutheteo, meaning "to admonish," and Adams emphasized the role of the counselor in directly confronting sin and encouraging obedience to God’s commands. However, Adams' rigid approach to counseling and its strict biblical orientation faced criticism from those who believed his methods were overly prescriptive and not adaptable to more secular or psychological approaches to therapy. Despite his influence, Adams' popularity waned in the 1980s, as some in the Christian counseling community began to seek a more balanced approach that integrated psychological insights with biblical principles.

Prior to this movement in the late 1960s and early 1970s, counseling had become something more secular and was no longer closely associated with the church. This shift likely began during the 19th century when developments in science and philosophy challenged traditional religious worldviews. Charles Darwin's On the Origin of Species (1859) questioned the biblical account of creation, causing panic among religious communities that held a literalist view of the Genesis narrative. In a similar vein, Wilhelm Wundt (1832–1920), known as the "father of experimental psychology", sought to explain psychological phenomena in naturalistic terms through careful observation and introspection. His approach rejected theistic explanations for human behavior, favoring naturalistic and introspective methods. Wundt’s work was pivotal in transforming psychology from a branch of philosophy to an experimental science.

In addition to Wundt, Sigmund Freud (1856–1939) offered secular explanations for religious belief. Freud proposed that belief in God often stems from an individual's relationship with their father. He argued that the "father complex," shaped by the Oedipus complex and early familial relationships, influenced one’s perception of God as an exalted father figure. Freud also developed psychotherapy as a field separate from the church. These intellectual movements collectively drove counseling practices away from the church and toward secular frameworks.

Jay Adams brought attention back to the church with his 1970 publication Competent to Counsel, which introduced nouthetic counseling. However, his influence waned by the 1980s, and the mantle was taken up by David Powlison. A convert to Christianity in adulthood, Powlison advanced Adams’ work and sought to refine the movement. His publication of the Journal of Biblical Counseling provided a platform for addressing critical issues within the field, such as balancing the authority of scripture with compassionate engagement, addressing complex psychological problems like trauma and addiction, and integrating insights from broader counseling disciplines without compromising biblical fidelity. Powlison’s efforts encouraged Biblical counselors to engage in ongoing self-evaluation and develop methods that were both theologically sound and practically effective, fostering a more nuanced and holistic approach to faith-based counseling.

== Integration with psychology ==
Efforts to combine counseling, psychotherapy or other scientific or academic endeavors with Christian or other religious perspectives or approaches are sometimes called "integration". Integration of academic subjects with theology has a long history in academia and continues in many colleges and universities that have continued their founding religious underpinnings. There are multiple kinds of integration, as it has been defined differently over the years. The way in which Christianity has been integrated with psychology thus far is by considering the ways in which psychology and the Bible agree and not integrating the teachings of psychology that don't agree with the Bible. While this tactic is still in progress and continuing to be looked at, there have been significant efforts to try and integrate the two. Stanton Jones and Richard Buteman came up with a list of three different methods on how to integrate psychology and the Christian faith. The methods are called pragmatic eclecticism, metatheoretical eclecticism, and theoretical integration. The first method, pragmatic eclecticism, looks at the best solutions for resolving patients' problems based on previous research comparing different methods that have been used. The second method is concerned with the effectiveness of the counselor and looks at the tactics they are using that are beneficial and those that are not. The third method takes theories that are previously existing and makes that the baseline from which further research can build upon. What all integrators of Christianity and psychology do believe as underlying truth is that all truth is God's truth.

== Principles ==
Christian counseling focuses on a few main principles. It focuses on a holistic approach. One that can help with the individuals mind, spirit, and bodies well-being. Another term often used is "soul-care". This approach is to incorporate Christian views from the Bible, and include traditional beliefs and values. It encourages diving into an individual's mental, spiritual, and physiological health with the aid of God throughout the process. The aim of Christian counseling is to help people regain a sense of hope for their life that is found in Jesus Christ. Christian counseling believes that at the core of what they do is to help others achieve a better understanding of themselves and God which is rooted in the Holy Spirit's conviction. Christian counselors seek to make people aware of the sin in their lives that has caused them suffering but also come to know the immense worth and value they have as a person to God.

== Powlison's Diagnostic Questions ==
Regarding the field of Christian counselling the American author David Powlison offers a diagnostic in tabular form, also known as Powlison's Diagnostic Questions Diagram. Thus, the diagram is utilized through an array of questions as the counsellor and the counselled proceed through the diagnostic modules. Powlison talks mainly about six modules; the first step is to examine the "stuff of life". Afterwards it is upon the counsellor to tackle four central modules, namely "Growth and Fruit", "Response and Thorns", "Motives and Heart", and "Transformation". In closing, Polwison recommends to focus on looking to Jesus in the final module which he refers to as "Cross-Based Solutions".

The "Stuff of Life"	Response; Thorns	Motives; Heart	Cross-Based Solutions	Transformation	Growth; Fruit
What happened? Who was there? When did it happen? Where were you? Has it happened before?	Your experience: How did you feel? Your emotions? Your behavior: What did you do? What did you say? Your thoughts: What were you thinking? What was your attitude? How did you interpret the situation?	What did you want? What were your expectations? What controls you? Who/ or what do you worship? What is your "mindset / worldview"? How would you describe your relationship with God?	What is "truth"? Who is the Lord? What has He done? What is He doing? How should you view the circumstances of life? What are biblically appropriate goals and desires?	What motive must be put off? What expectation must be yielded? What scriptural promises must be believed? What idol must be torn down?	What "fruit of the Spirit" attitudes must be put on? What biblical disciplines must be begun or renewed? From whom must you seek forgiveness; make restitution? What ministry should you begin or resume?

== Criticism ==
Jay E. Adams published Competent to Counsel in 1970, criticizing the influence of psychology throughout Christian counseling. He began the Nouthetic counseling movement which teaches that the Bible alone is sufficient for all counseling. While Nouthetic counseling is strictly based on the Biblical scriptures and the power of the Holy Spirit separate from any psychological implementations, Christian counseling tries to implement psychology and Christianity still keeping God and biblical truths in the picture. While they do not take psychology as the absolute answer or solution to problems that people face, it is used as a tool in unity with Christianity to help people have a deeper understanding of themselves and God.
