= Journal of Psychology & Theology =

- Discipline: Psychology
- Language: English

Publication details
- History: 1973 to present
- Publisher: SAGE Publications for Rosemead School of Psychology, Biola University (United States)
- Frequency: Quarterly

Standard abbreviations
- ISO 4: J. Psychol. Theol.

Indexing
- ISSN: 0091-6471

Links
- Journal homepage; Journal at SAGE

The Journal of Psychology & Theology (JPT) is a peer-reviewed academic journal published by Biola University's Rosemead School of Psychology and has been operating continuously since 1973. JPT is a quarterly journal publishing original research on the integration of psychology and Christian theology. Empirical studies and theoretical pieces investigating the interrelationships between psychological (e.g., clinical, experimental, industrial/organizational, social, theoretical) and theological topics of study are considered. Scholarship that explores the application of these interrelationships in a variety of contexts (e.g., mental health counseling, education and training, organizational leadership, churches and other Christian ministry contexts) and/or from an intercultural perspective are encouraged.
