= Shin BockEyun =

South Korean theologian (1926–2016)

Shin BockEyun (申福潤, October 27, 1926 [Lunar Calendar] – January 14, 2016) was a Korean theologian and Protestant pastor. His pen name was Namsong (南松). In 1972, he became the first scholar in South Korea to write a doctoral dissertation on John Calvin. Together with theologians Lee Jong-Sung and Han Chul-Ha, he played a leading role in developing Calvinist theology in Korea. He served as the president of the Korean Calvin Society in 1990.

Throughout his life, he dedicated himself to studying and presenting research on Calvin, including translating the final 1559 edition of Institutes of the Christian Religion into Korean. He was recognized as an international authority on Calvin studies, representing Korea in this field.

He was a professor at Chongshin University, and later served as the president and honorary president of Hapdong Theological Seminary. His academic specialization was systematic theology, and in 2009, he was honored by the Calvin 500th Anniversary Commemoration Committee as a distinguished contributor to Calvin scholarship.

At the Calvin 500th Anniversary Memorial Worship Service, he preached that Calvin emphasized the purity and holiness of the church. Accordingly, believers must strive for sanctification, achieve genuine reformation through repentance, and begin anew with Calvin's theology.

In 2015, he was selected as a Christian leader in 100 Years of Yonsei Theology through Key Figures, published by the Yonsei University College of Theology Alumni Association. He died on January 14, 2016.

== Education and academic background ==
- B.A. in English Literature, Seokyeong University
- Th.M., Yonsei University Graduate School
- M.Div., Presbyterian Theological Seminary (currently Chongshin University)
- University of Southern California
- Ph.D., California Graduate School of Theology
- Research Fellow, Yale University Divinity School
- Visiting Scholar, Princeton Theological Seminary
- Visiting Scholar, Trinity Evangelical Divinity School
- February 1962: Acting Principal, Calvin University
- April 30, 1985: 2nd President, Hapdong Theological Seminary University
- March 2, 1997: 5th President, Hapdong Theological Seminary University

== Theological characteristics ==
The theological thought of Namsong Shin Bock-Eyun is marked by his views on Scripture, his God-centered theology, ecclesiology, eschatology, and his emphasis on Reformed theology. Shin's theology was firmly grounded in Calvin’s theology, interpreting Scripture through Calvin’s lens and building theological principles based on the Bible. Calvin and the Bible were the two central pillars of his theology. Even amid the corruption within the Korean church, he devoted himself to establishing a pure and faithful church. In the underdeveloped theological context of Korea, he contributed to the formation of Reformed systematic theology and strongly emphasized a transformative cultural worldview. He also advocated an eschatology of “forsakenness.”

Rooted in Calvin’s thought, he stressed God-centered theology and upheld the doctrine of God’s absolute sovereignty, asserting that this principle must be applied to all areas of life. He critically assessed Korean mysticism, dispensationalism, and infantile fundamentalist theology, contributing significantly to establishing the essence of orthodox Reformed theology in Korea.

== Books ==
- 『죤 칼빈』
- 『칼빈신학과 한국교회의 과제』
- 『기초 교리학』(대한예수교장로회총회 교육부)
- 『나는 하나님을 믿는다』(성광문화사)
- 『칼빈의 신학사상』(성광문화사)
- 『교의학 서론』(합동신학대학원)
- 『종말론』(개혁주의 신행협회)
- 『칼빈의 하나님 중심의 신학』(합동신학대학원)
- 『개혁주의 신학의 특징』(합동신학대학원)

== Translations ==
- 20th Century Western Theology (Carl Henry, Seoul: Seongam Publishing, 1959)
- Institutes of the Christian Religion (John Calvin) (Co-translated)
- Introduction to Christian Theology (Louis Berkhof)
- History of Christian Doctrines (Louis Berkhof)
- The Doctrine of the Church (Louis Berkhof)
- The Basic Principles of Calvinism (Henry Meeter)
- Calvin’s Doctrine of Predestination (F. H. Klooster)
- The Jesus Who Gives Life with Meaning (James Stalker)
- Calvin’s Geneva (William Monter)

== Pictures ==
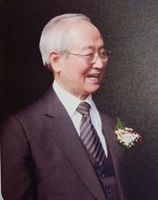
In his church

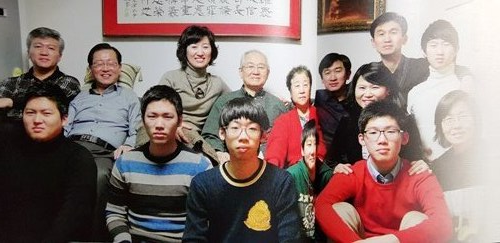
His family

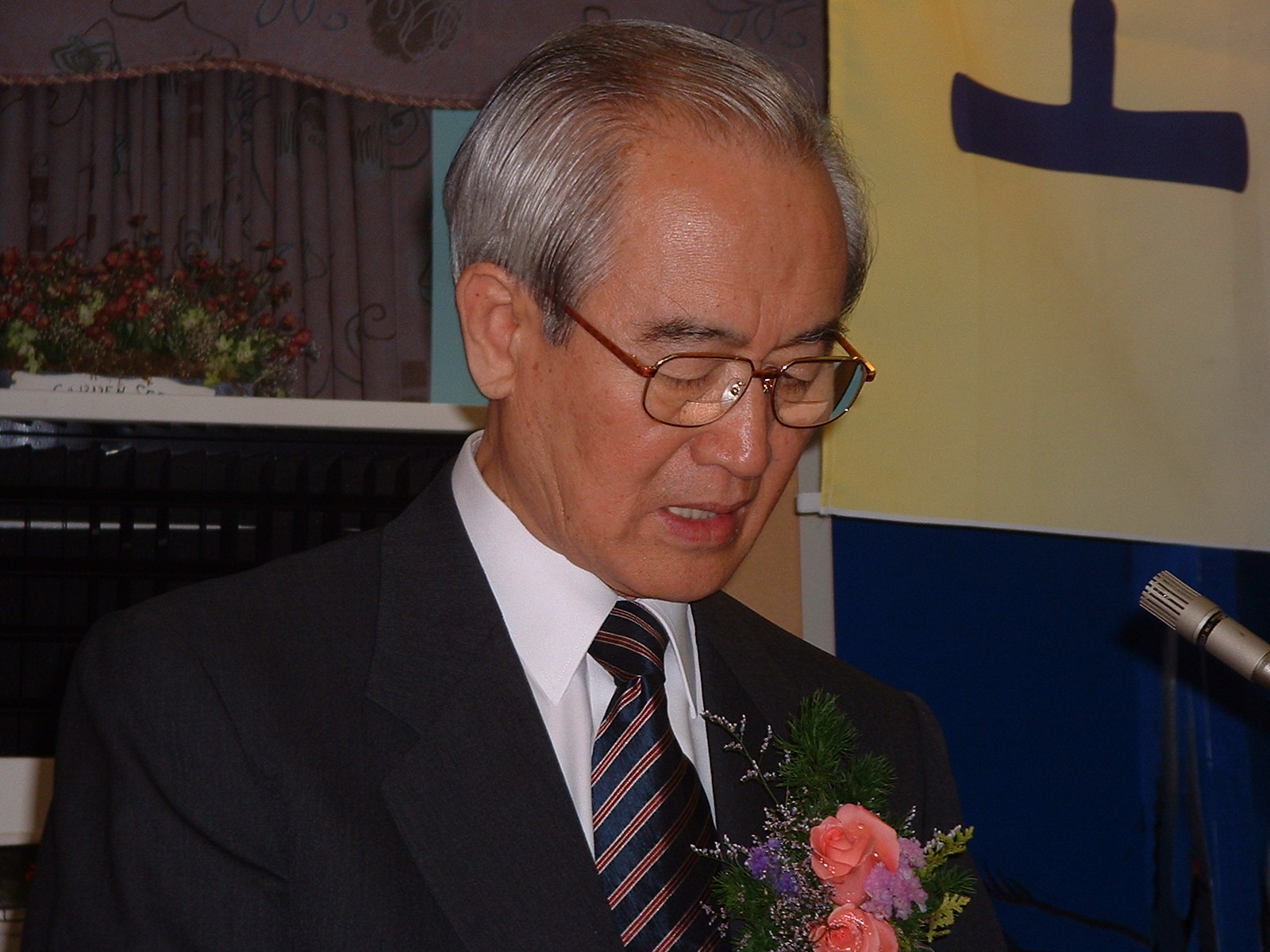
2003

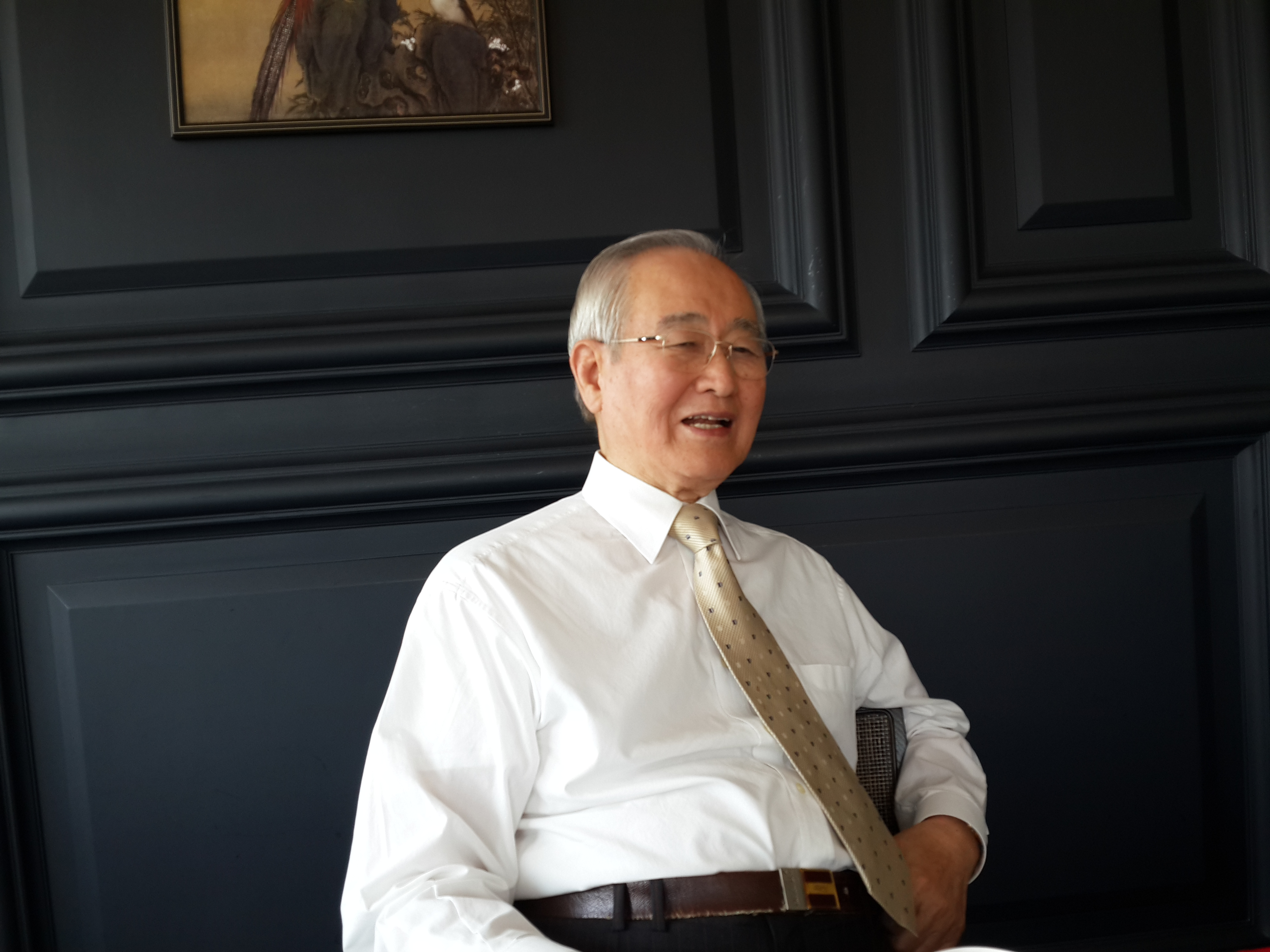
2014, Seoul Palace Hotel
