= Kim Myung-hyuk =

South Korean pastor (1937–2024)

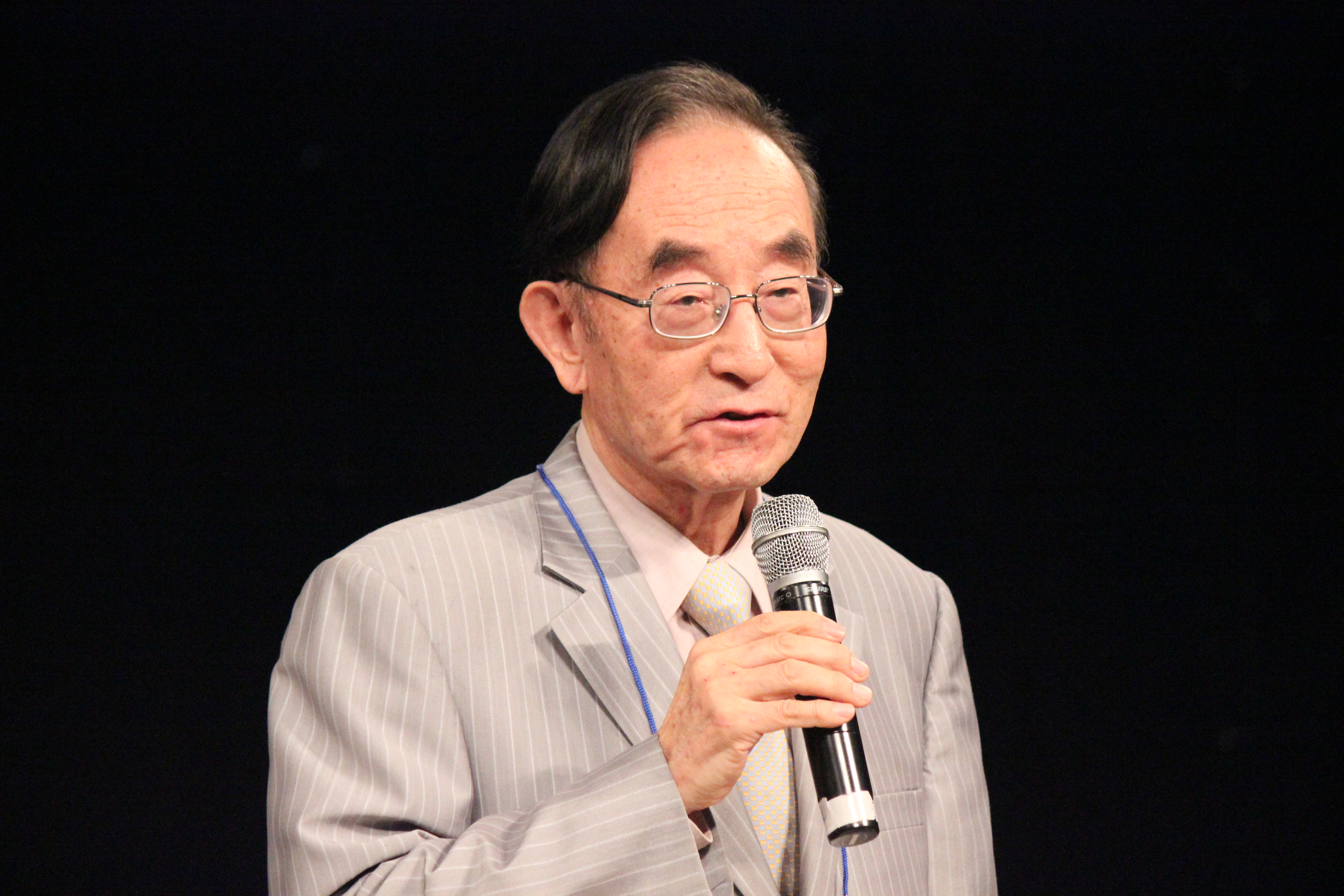

President of Hapdong Theological Seminary
- In office 1989–1993
- Preceded by: Shin Bok-yoon
- Succeeded by: Yoon Young-tak

Personal details
- Born: June 4, 1937 Tokyo, Japan
- Died: February 18, 2024 (aged 86) South Korea
- Education: Seoul National University, Faith Theological Seminary, Westminster Theological Seminary, Yale Divinity School
- Alma mater: Aquinas Institute of Theology
- Occupation: Pastor, professor

Korean name
- Hangul: 김명혁
- Hanja: 金明赫
- RR: Gim Myeonghyeok
- MR: Kim Myŏnghyŏk

Kim Myung-hyuk (Korean: 김명혁; June 4, 1937 – February 18, 2024) was a South Korean Presbyterian pastor and academic. He served as a senior pastor for Kangbyun Church and the chairman of the Korea Evangelical Fellowship (KEF).

== Biography ==
Kim Myung-hyuk was born on June 4, 1937, in Tokyo, Japan. He was the son of North Korean pastor Kim Gwan-ju. Kim Myung-hyuk spent the first few years of his life in northern Korea, living in Sinuiju from ages 2 to 9, and Pyongyang from ages 10 to 11. In 1947, his father was arrested by the North Korean authorities. In August 1948, aged 11, Kim crossed 38th parallel north to South Korea. In 1956, Kim graduated from Seoul High School. In 1961, he graduated from Seoul National University with a Bachelor of Arts. Kim attended several seminaries, getting a Bachelor of Divinity from Faith Theological Seminary in 1964, a Master of Theology from Westminster Theological Seminary in 1966, and a Master of Sacred Theology from Yale Divinity School in 1967. In December 1972, he earned his Ph.D. at the Aquinas Institute of Theology.

In 1974, Kim returned to South Korea. on April 6, 1980, Kim founded Kangbyun Church and served as its senior pastor for 28 years until January 13, 2008. On October 22, 1984, Kim was selected as the General Secretary of the Korea Evangelical Fellowship (KEF). He would later serve as its chairman from 2002 to 2018. Kim served as a professor and lecturer at Chongshin University and Hapdong Theological Seminary. He appointed as Hapdong Thological Seminary's third president on April 18, 1989, and served until 1993.

On February 18, 2024, Kim Myung-hyuk was killed in an automobile accident while on his way to preach at a church in the Chuncheon area. He was 86.
