= Seung-Goo Lee =

South Korean academic (born 1959)

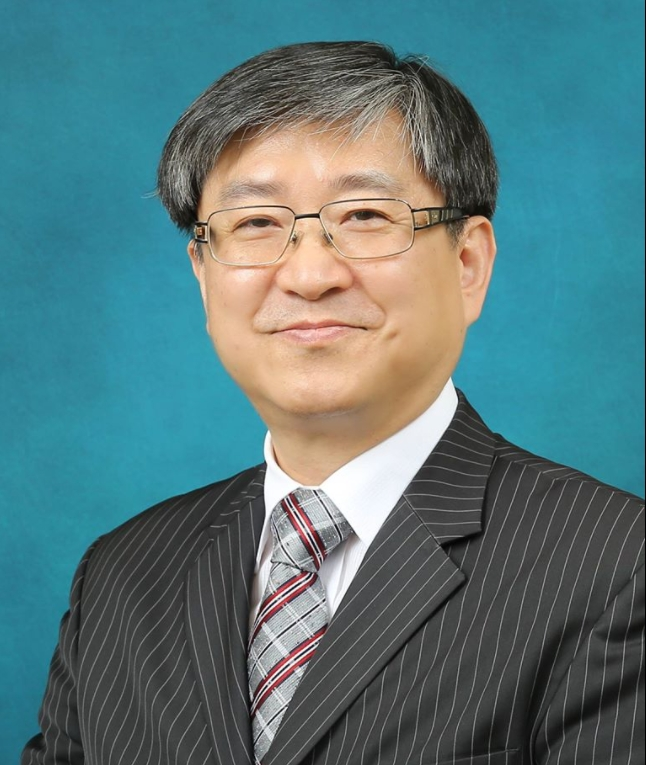
- Lee in 2021
- Born: February 1, 1959 (age 67); South Korea
- Occupations: Professor, Academic and Theologian
- Known for: Reformed Theology, Modern Theology, Christianity, Calvinism
- Title: Chair Professor of the Systematic Theology, Reformed Theology

Academic background
- Education: Th.B., M.Ed., M.Div, M.Phil., Ph.D.
- Alma mater: University of St. Andrews

Academic work
- Institutions: Hapdong Theological Seminary

Seung-Goo Lee (Korean: 이승구; Hanja: 李承九; born February 1, 1959) is a distinguished professor of the Hapdong Theological Seminary in South Korea. He teaches systematic theology. He received repeated recognition throughout his career. He published many books and translations. He wrote more than 20 books in Korean and two in English. He translated 26 books from English to Korean. He interpreted lectures of many foreign scholars, and gave presentations at international conferences.

== Early life ==
He studied Christian Education (B.A.) at Chongshin University, Seoul National University Graduate School (Ethics Education, M.Ed.), Hapdong Theological Graduate University (M. Divinity). He earned his Ph.D. (1990) at the University of St Andrews under the supervision of Dr. Daphne Hampson. Between 1990 and 1992, he worked as a Research Fellow in Yale Divinity School.

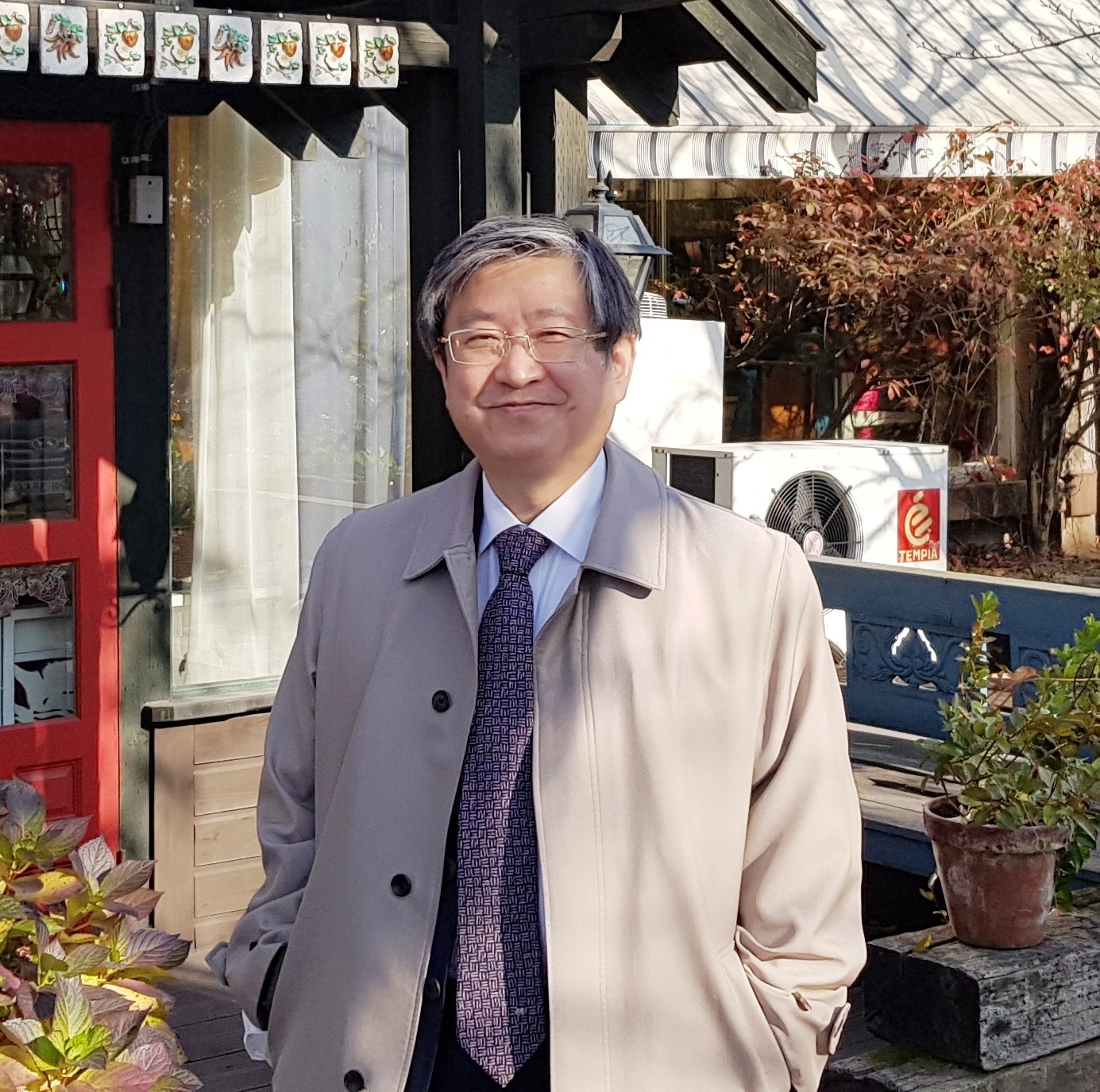
Dr. Lee in 2020

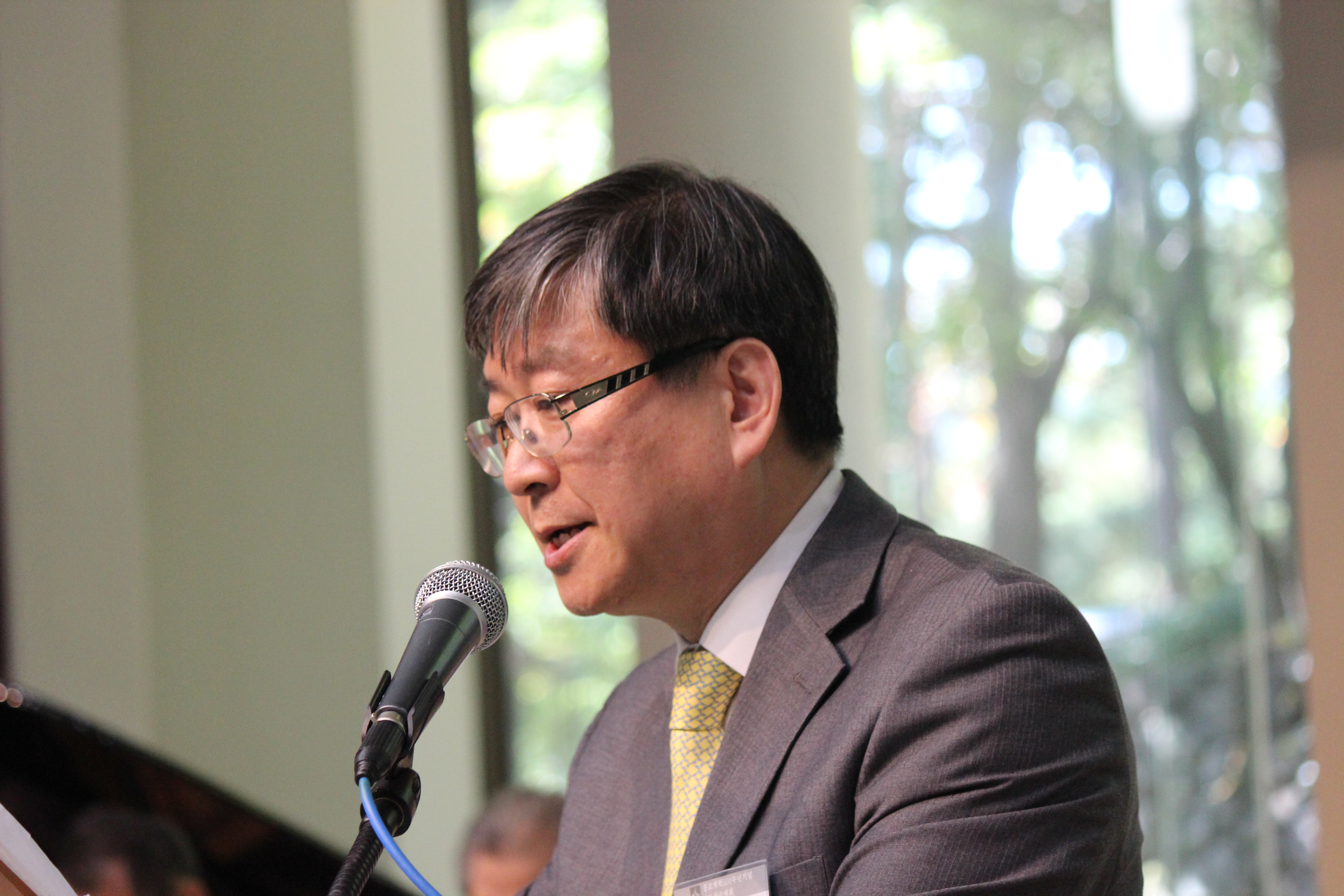
Professor Lee speaking at an event commemorating the 500th anniversary of the Protestant Reformation (2017)

== Titles ==
- Professor of Systematic Theology, Westminster Graduate School of Theology (1992.1-1999.2.)
- Professor of Systematic Theology, International Graduate School of Theology (1999.3-2009.2)
- Professor of Systematic Theology, Hapdong Graduate School of Theology (2009,3-present)
- Visiting Scholar, Calvin College, Calvin Institute (Summer 2000)
- Visiting Scholar, Faculty of Theology, Vrije Universiteit, Amsterdam (fall 2006)
- president of the Korean Evangelical Systematic Theology Society (2000–2002), editor-in-chief of the Research Systematic Theology (2009)
- Auditor of the Korean Evangelical Theological Society (2004- 2006), Editor-in-Chief (2006)
- Secretary of the Korean Bible Theological Society (1997–present)
- General Secretary of the Korean Society for Reformation (2004–2006), Director of General Affairs (2008–2012)
- Secretary of the Korean Presbyterian Theological Society (2004–2006), Secretary (2008-present), Editor-in-Chief of Presbyterian Church and Theology (2009)
- President of the Korean Society of Kierkegaard (2005)
- Chairman of Education Committee, Christian Research Institute (2003–2005), Research Fellow (2001–present)
- Chairman of the executive committee for the 500th Anniversary of the Reformation (2011–present)
- Journal of Reformed Theology, Asian Editor (2006–Present)
- Vice-president, Korean Reformation Society (2012–2018)
- Member of Korean Academy of Christian Studies
- Senior Vice President, Korean Evangelical Theological Society (2018–2020)
- President of the Korean Presbyterian Theological Society (2016–2018)
- Vice-president, Korean Reformation Society (2012–2018)
- President of the Korean Reformation Society (2018–2020)
- Director and executive secretary of the Beyer House Society (2018-)

== Recognition ==
- Selected as one of the most influential scholars in Bible and theology (2011)
- President of the Korean Evangelical Theological Society (2020–2022)
- President of the Korean Presbyterian Theological Society
- President of the Korean Reformed Theological Society
- Founder of the Korean Presbyterian Theological Society
- Founder of the Korean Biblical Theological Society
- Founder of the Korean Kierkegaard Society
- Founder of the Peter Paul Johannes Beyerhaus Society

== See also ==
- Hapdong Theological Seminary
- Bong-ho Son
- Yung-Han Kim
