= Peter Beyerhaus =

German theologian (1929–2020)

- Born: Peter Paul Johannes Beyerhaus; 1 February 1929; Hohenkränig, Brandenburg, Weimar Republic
- Died: 18 January 2020 (aged 90); Tübingen, Baden-Württemberg, Germany
- Education: Uppsala University
- Occupations: Pastor; Theologian; Missionary scholar
- Organizations: Berlin Missionary Society; Lutheran Theological College in Uphumulo; University of Tübingen; Yonsei University

Peter Paul Johannes Beyerhaus (1 February 1929 – 18 January 2020) was a German Protestant pastor, theologian, missionary scholar and academic teacher. As a missionary theologian, he created a German mission theology. On 5 October 2018, by a few scholars like Seung-Goo Lee and Yung-Han Kim the Society of Peter Beyerhaus was founded in his name in South Korea.

== Biography ==
Peter Paul Johannes Beyerhaus was born in Hohenkränig, Brandenburg near Königsberg, New March. the eldest son of Siegfried Beyerhaus, Lutheran pastor in the east of the Oder river. After graduating from high school, he began to study theology in Berlin, Halle, Heidelberg, Bonn, Uppsala and Bethel. In Uppsala, he met his wife, Ingegärd. He also met Bengt Sundkler there, who was to become his doctoral adviser. He learned from them the history of salvation and redemption of the Bible. His teacher influenced the formation of his missionary theology. Beyerhaus was ordained as a pastor by the bishop of Berlin on 15 January 1955, and was married on 6 August 1955 in the home town of his fiancée. The following year, he went to Oxford to study English. After returning to Sweden in the summer of 1956, he served several local churches in Norrköping. The couple's first daughter, Karolina, was born there. He completed his doctorate at Uppsala University in 1958. The title of the doctoral thesis was Die Selbständigkeit der jungen Kirchen als missionarisches Problem (The independence of young churches as a missiological problem).

He served the Berlin Missionary Society in South Africa until 1965, finally as Rektor of the Lutheran Theological College in Uphumulo, Natal. He was professor of missionary theology and ecumenical theology at the University of Tübingen from 1966 to 1997, serving as dean of the theological faculty in 1974/75. He still taught as a professor emeritus at institutions such as Gustav-Siewert-Akademie, Staatsunabhängige Theologische Hochschule in Basel, the faculty of Protestant theology in Heverlee/Leuven in Belgium and the Yonsei University in Seoul, South Korea. He lectured around the world.

In 1972 he became president of the Theologischer Konvent der Konferenz Bekennender Gemeinschaften which he had co-founded. He was president of the IKBG/ICN from 1978 to 2009. He was awarded an honorary doctorate from the Trinity Evangelical Divinity School, Deerfield, Illinois, in 1995. Beyerhaus died on 18 January 2020.

== Books ==
- Die Selbständigkeit der jungen Kirchen als missionarisches Problem, Wuppertal-Barmen 1956.
- Er sandte sein Wort. Theologie der christlichen Mission, SCM-Verlag 1996, ISBN 978-3-417294125.
- Kein anderer Name: Die Einzigartigkeit Jesu Christi und das Gespräch mit nichtchristlichen Religionen. Festschrift zum 70. Geburtstag von Peter Beyerhaus, VTR (Verlag für Theologie und Religionswissenschaft), Nürnberg 1999, ISBN 978-3-933372-25-3.
- Mission and Apologetics, VTR, Nürnberg 2005, ISBN 978-3-937965-44-4.
- Weltweite Gemeinschaft im Leiden für Christus, VTR, Nürnberg 2007, ISBN 978-3-937965-59-8.
- Das Geheimnis der Dreieinigkeit im Zeugnis der Kirche: Trinitarisch anbeten – lehren – leben. Ein bekenntnis-ökumenisches Handbuch, VTR / Dominus, 2009, ISBN 978-3-937965-84-0 (VTR) / ISBN 978-3-940879-04-2 (Dominus).
- Christliches Zeugnis in unserer Zeit. Band 1: Der Glaubenskampf der Bekennenden Evangelischen Gemeinschaften in Deutschland (autobiography, with Dorothea Killus and Rolf Sauerzapf, VTR, Nürnberg 2015, ISBN 978-3-95776-042-5.
