= Park Yune-sun =

Korean biblical scholar

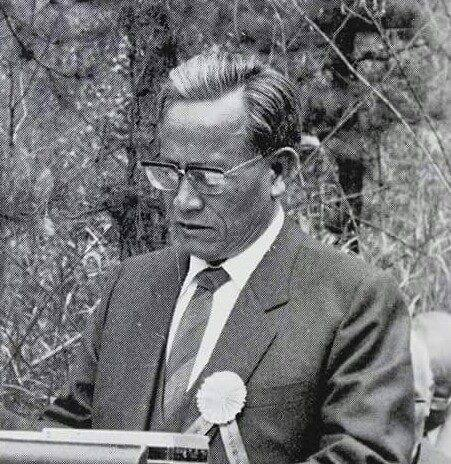

Korean name
- Hangul: 박윤선
- Hanja: 朴允善
- RR: Bak Yunseon
- MR: Pak Yunsŏn

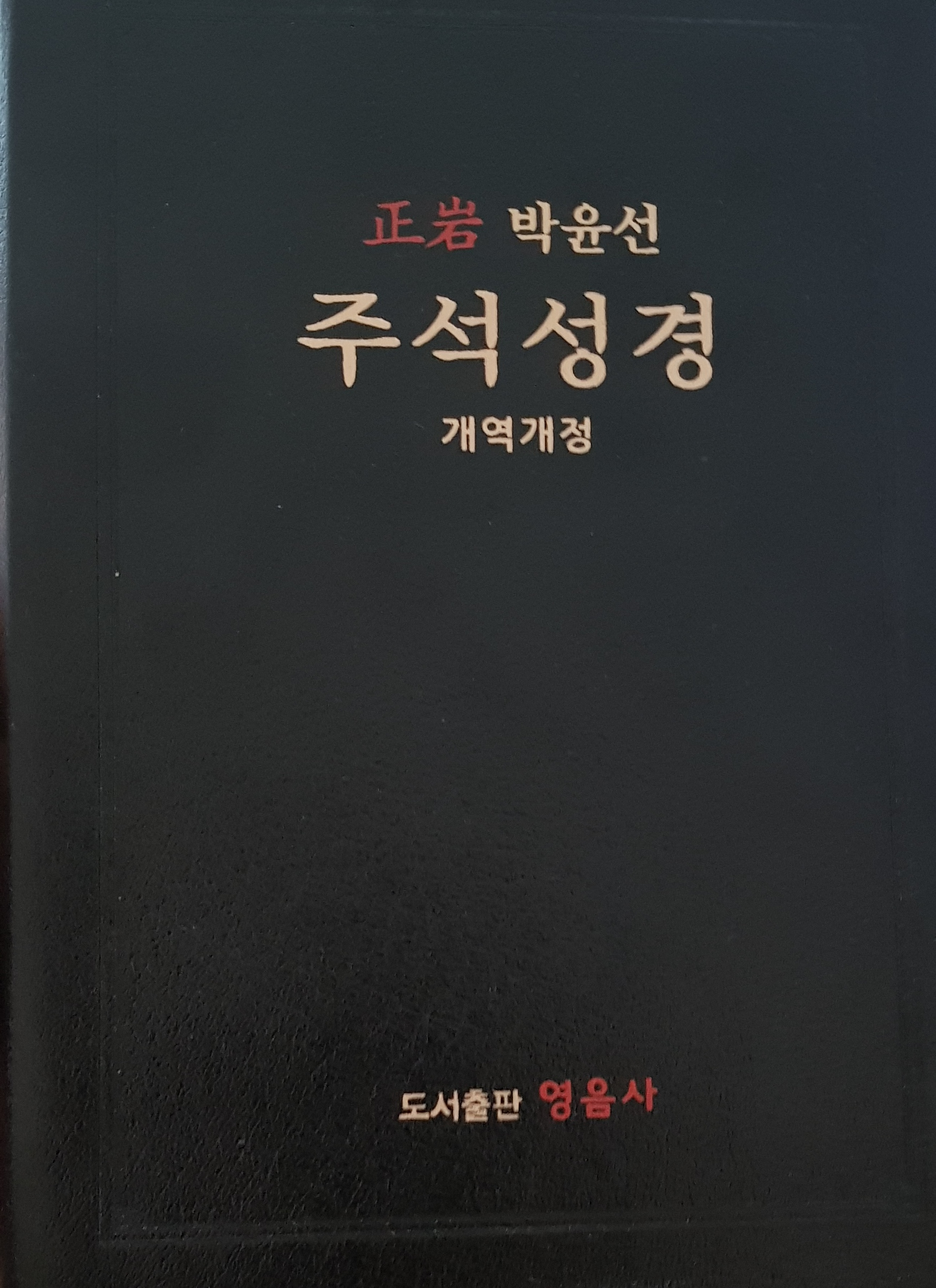
The Bible Commentary of Par Yun-Sun (박윤선박사의 주석성경)

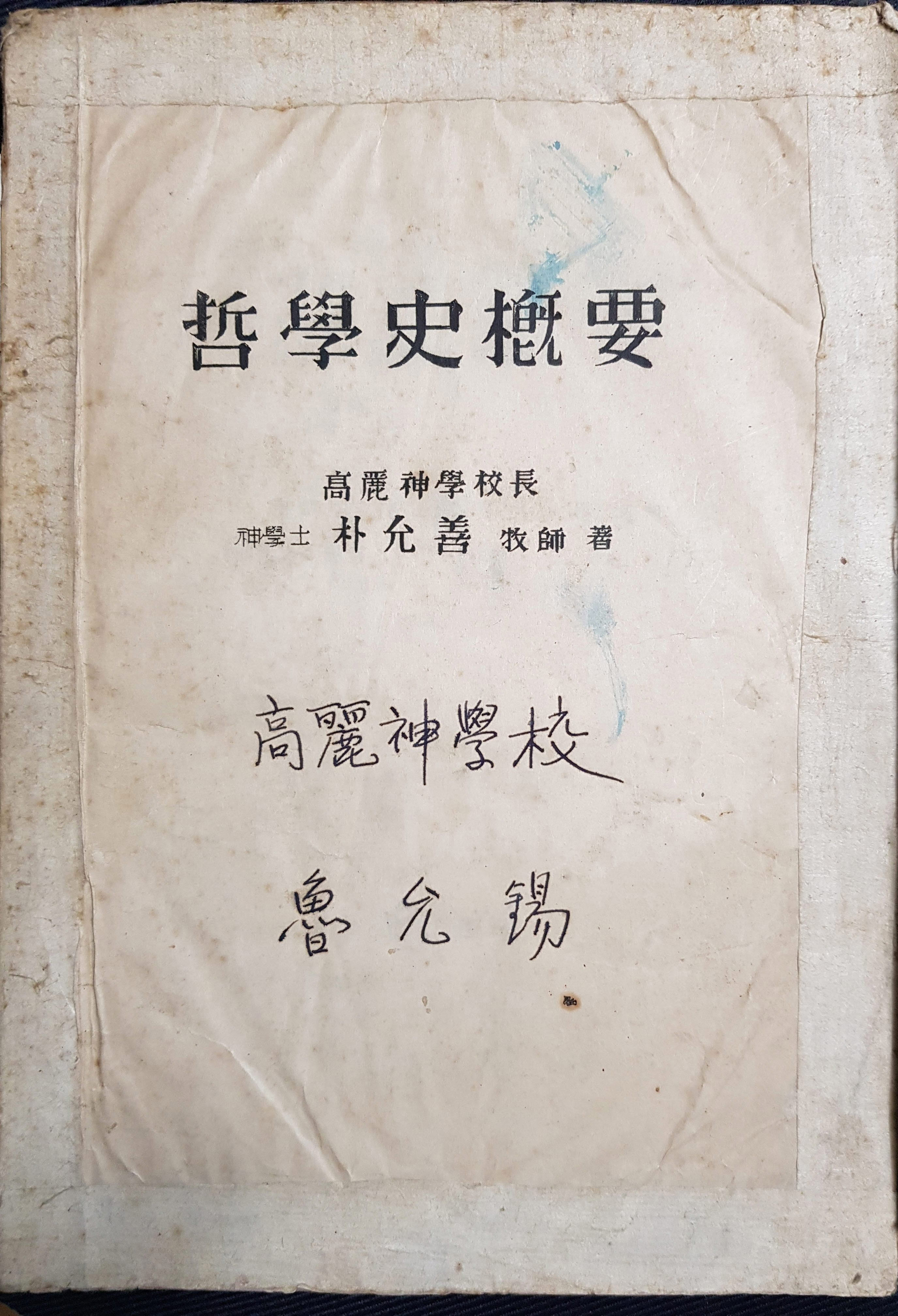
Lecture Syllabus of Dr. Yun-Sun Park, Korea Theological Seminary, Busan, South Korea, around 1957

Park Yune-Sun (December 11, 1905 – June 30, 1988) was a Korean biblical scholar born in Cholsan, North Pyongan Province. After completing his undergraduate studies at Soongsil University, he enrolled at Westminster Theological Seminary in the US. Then, he went on to Holland for further theological training (October 1953 - March 1954). In 1979, he completed his voluminous and historic scholarly work on the commentaries of all sixty-six books of the Old and New Testaments. Park has been considered to be the pre-eminent Calvin scholar in Korea. He taught at Kosin University (1946–1960), Chongshin University (1963–1974, 1979–1980), and Hapdong Theological Seminary (1980–1988). He introduced to Koreans the works of C. Hodge, Machen, Warfield, A. Kuyper, Bavinck, Schilder, and Greijdanus.
