= Deok-Kyo Oh =

South Korean theologian (born 1952)

DeokKyo Oh
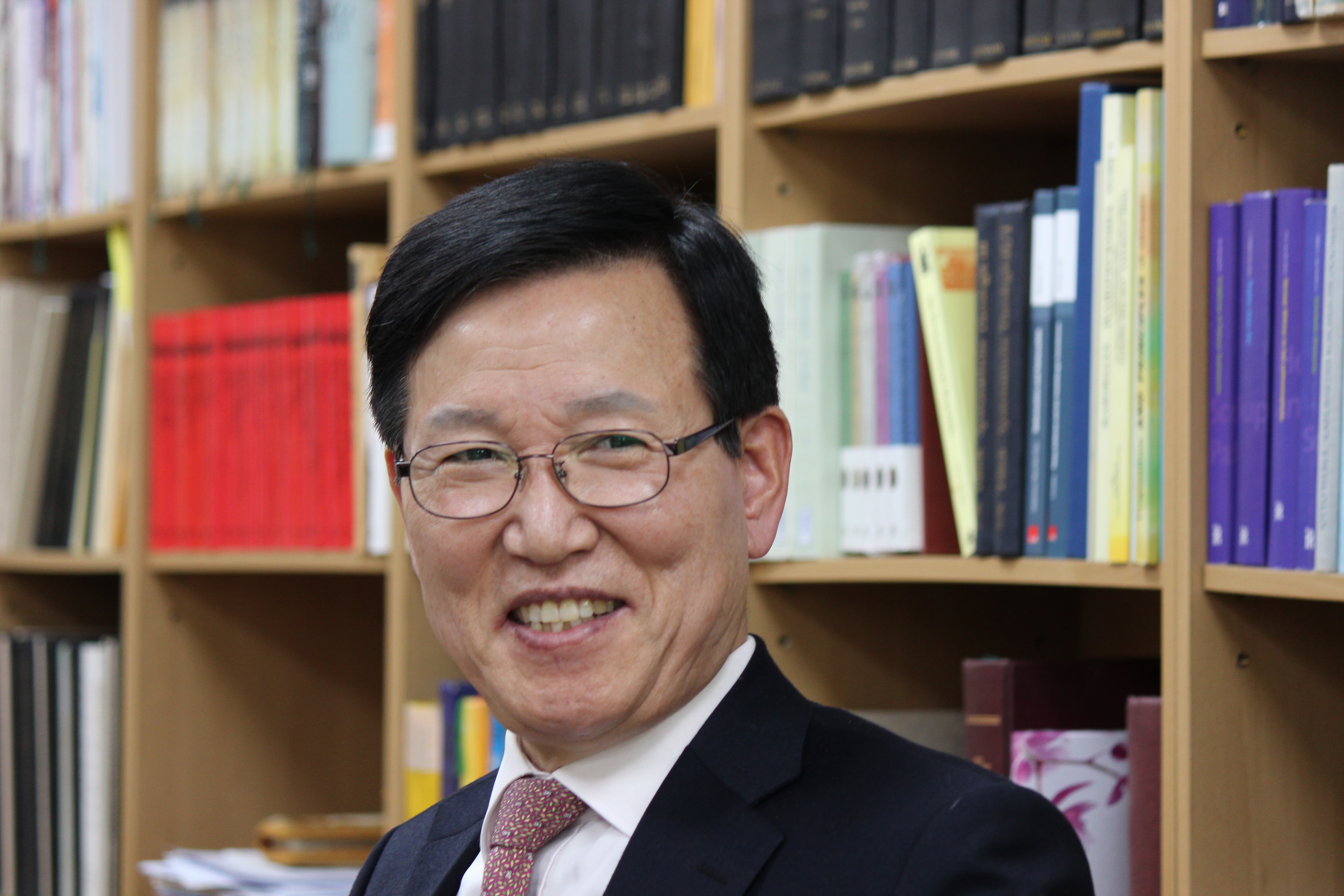
- Professor Deok-Kyo Oh
- Education: Th.M. Ph.D.
- Alma mater: Westminster Theological Seminary,
- Occupation: Professor
- Known for: Research on church history, the Reformation, and Puritans

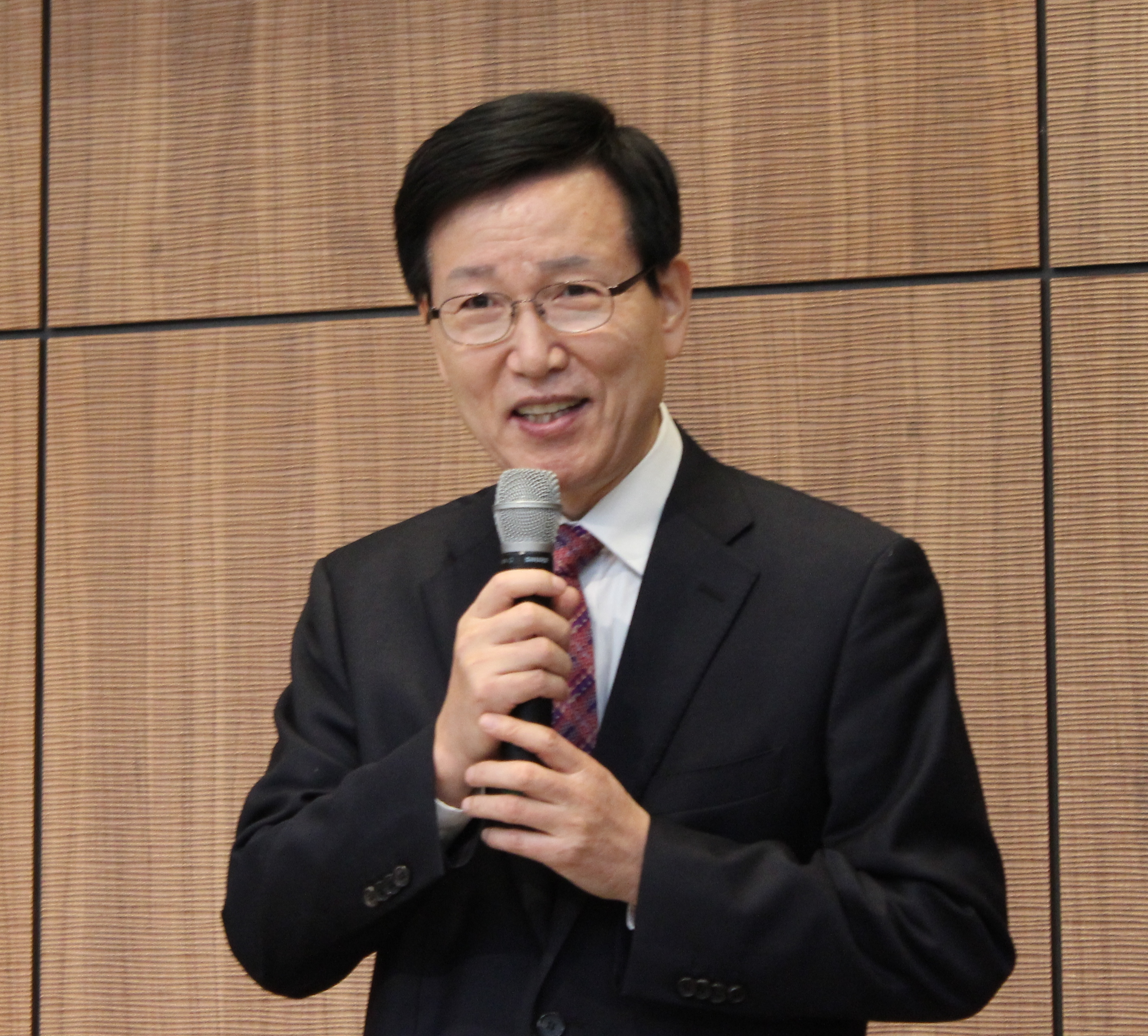
Dr. Deok-Kyo Oh speaking in the Society of Presbyterian Theology in 2018, Seoul, South Korea

Deok-Kyo Oh (Korean: 오덕교; born 14 December 1952) is a South Korean theologian. He served as the president of Hapdong Theological Seminary in South Korea and President of the International University of Ulaanbaatar in Mongolia. He became a member of South Korea's National Unification Advisory Council in 2014. He is the president of Torch Trinity Graduate University in 2024.

== Early life ==
Deokkyo Oh was born in Boryeong, South Chungcheong Province, South Korea in 1952. He studied theology at Chongshin University (BA), Graduate School of Theology (M.Div.), and graduate school (Th.M.).

== Career ==
He was ordained as a pastor at the Chungnam Presbytery Church in 1978. He served as chaplain in the South Korean Air Force until 1981. He worked as a full-time lecturer at Chongshin University School of Theology in 1981.

In September 1982 he began to study at Westminster Theological Seminary in Philadelphia. In 1987 he became the first Korean to get Ph.D. there. His dissertation was "the Churches Resurrection : John Cotton’s Eschatological Understanding of the Ecclesiastical Reformation".

After returning to South Korea, he taught church history for 27 years. He served as the 7th President of Hapdong Theological Seminary (2005-2009). He was a research fellow at Yale University Divinity School (1986), and visiting professor at Westminster Theological Seminary (1992–1993), and Stellenbosch University of South Africa (2000).

== Recognition ==
- President of the Presbyterian Theological Society of Korea (2014)
- President of the International University of Ulaanbaatar in Mongolia (2014-2017)
- Best educator award - Mongolian government (2017)
- Theologian of the year from the Memorial Association of the 500th anniversary of the birth of John Calvin
- Member of South Korea's National Unification Advisory Council (2015)

He is a member of the editorial committee for Unio cum Christo: An International Reformed Journal on Faith and Life.

== Academic degrees ==
- Chongshin University (1975), BA
- Chongshin University (1978,), M. Div.
- Chongshin University (1981), Th. M.
- Westminster Theological Seminary (1987), Ph.D.

== Works (books) ==
- The Churches Resurrection: John Cotton's Eschatological Understanding of The Ecclesiastical Reformation." Westminster Theological Seminary (Ph.D. 1987) (English)
- 『청교도와 교회개혁』(합신대학원출판부)
- 『장로교회사』(합신대학원출판부)
- 『빈야드 운동 무엇이 문제인가』(교회와 신앙)
- 『종교개혁사』(합신대학원출판부)
- 『청교도 이야기』(이레서원)
- 『언덕위의 도시: 청교도의 사회 개혁 이상』(합신대학원출판부)
- 『개혁신학과 한국교회』(합신대학원출판부)
