= Peter Beyer =

Peter Beyer may refer to:

- Peter Beyer (politician) (born 1970), German politician
- Peter Beyer (professor) (born 1952), German geneticist

== See also ==
- Peter Beyerhaus (1929–2020), German theologian
