= Krajnik Górny =

- Village
- Location within Poland
- Coordinates: 53°1′5″N 14°18′42″E
- Country: Poland
- Voivodeship: West Pomeranian
- County: Gryfino
- Gmina: Chojna

Krajnik Górny [ˈkrai̯nik ˈɡurnɨ] (German: Hohenkränig) is a village in the administrative district of Gmina Chojna, within Gryfino County, West Pomeranian Voivodeship, in north-western Poland, close to the German border. It lies approximately 10 km (6 mi) north-west of Chojna, 29 km (18 mi) south-west of Gryfino, and 48 km (30 mi) south of the regional capital Szczecin.

As of 2011, it had a population of 151.
