= Hapdong Theological Seminary =

Presbyterian seminary in South Korea

- Motto: 바른신학 바른교회 바른생활
- Motto in English: "Upright Theology, Upright Church, Upright Life"
- Type: Private
- Established: 1980; 46 years ago
- President: Sang-Hyuch Ahn
- Location: Suwon, Gyeonggi Province, South Korea
- Website: hapdong.ac.kr hapdong.ac.kr/English/E-index.htm

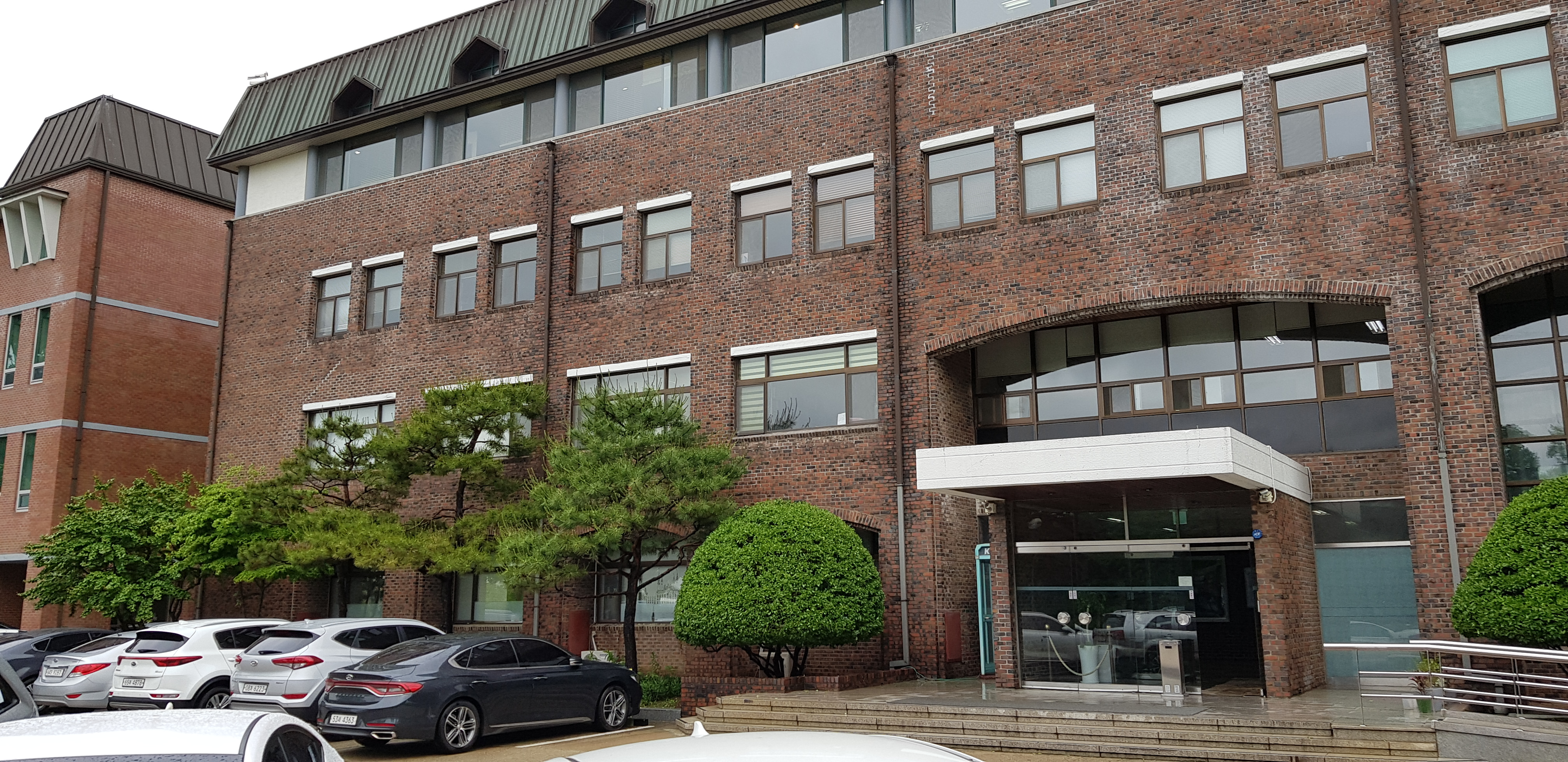
Hapdong Theological Seminary

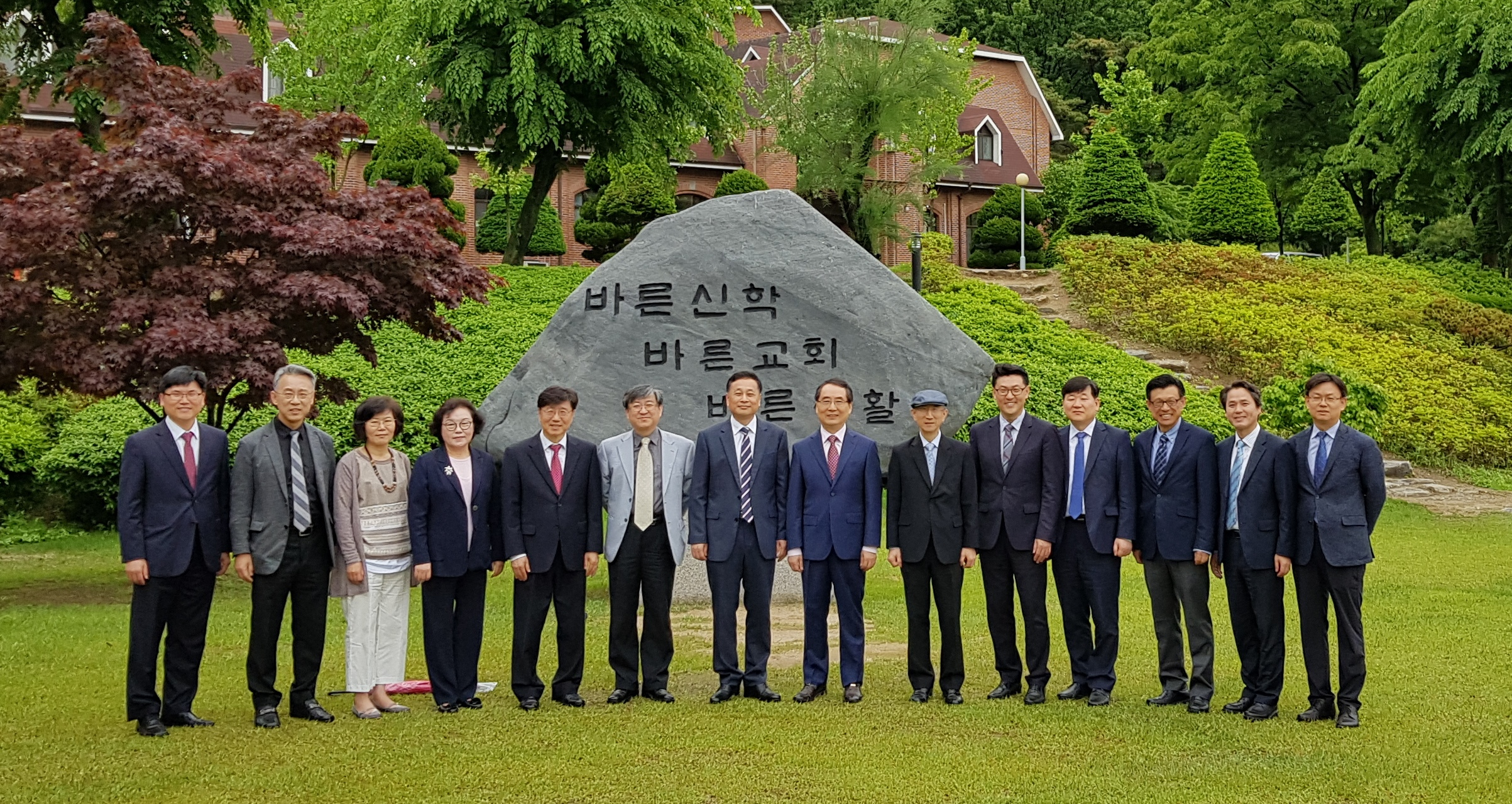
professors of Hapdong Theological Seminary

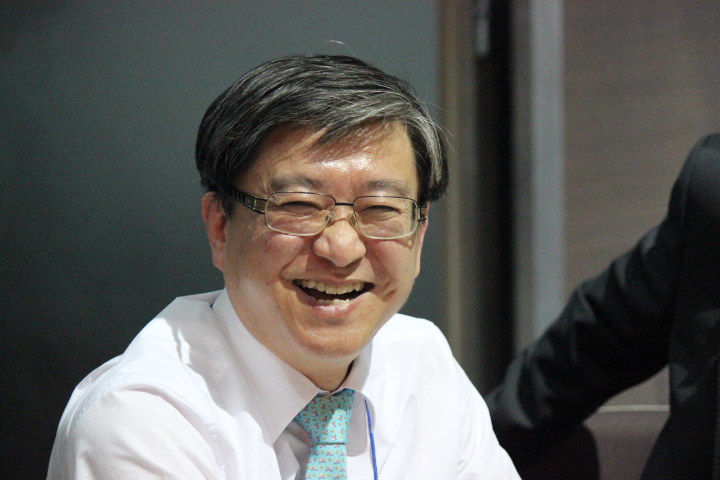
Prof.Seung-Goo Lee

Hapdong Theological Seminary (Korean: 합동신학대학원대학교; Hanja: 合同神學大學院大學校) is a Presbyterian seminary in South Korea.

The history of Hapdong Theological Seminary began with its founding on November 11, 1980. Park Yune-sun was appointed as its first president. Originally located in the Gangnam District of Seoul, in November 1982, it moved to its current location in Suwon, Gyeonggi Province. Hapdong Theological Seminary upholds 3 pillars of school motto which are founded upon the Reformed faith. The school motto begins with a Korean word, "Barun," which means "upright," "correct," or (morally) "right" : "Upright Theology (God-honoring Theology), Upright Church (Christ-centered Church), Upright Life (Spirit-filled Life)."

== See also ==
- Park Yune-sun
- Deok-Kyo Oh
- Seung-Goo Lee
