= Yung-Han Kim =

Korean theologian (born 1946)

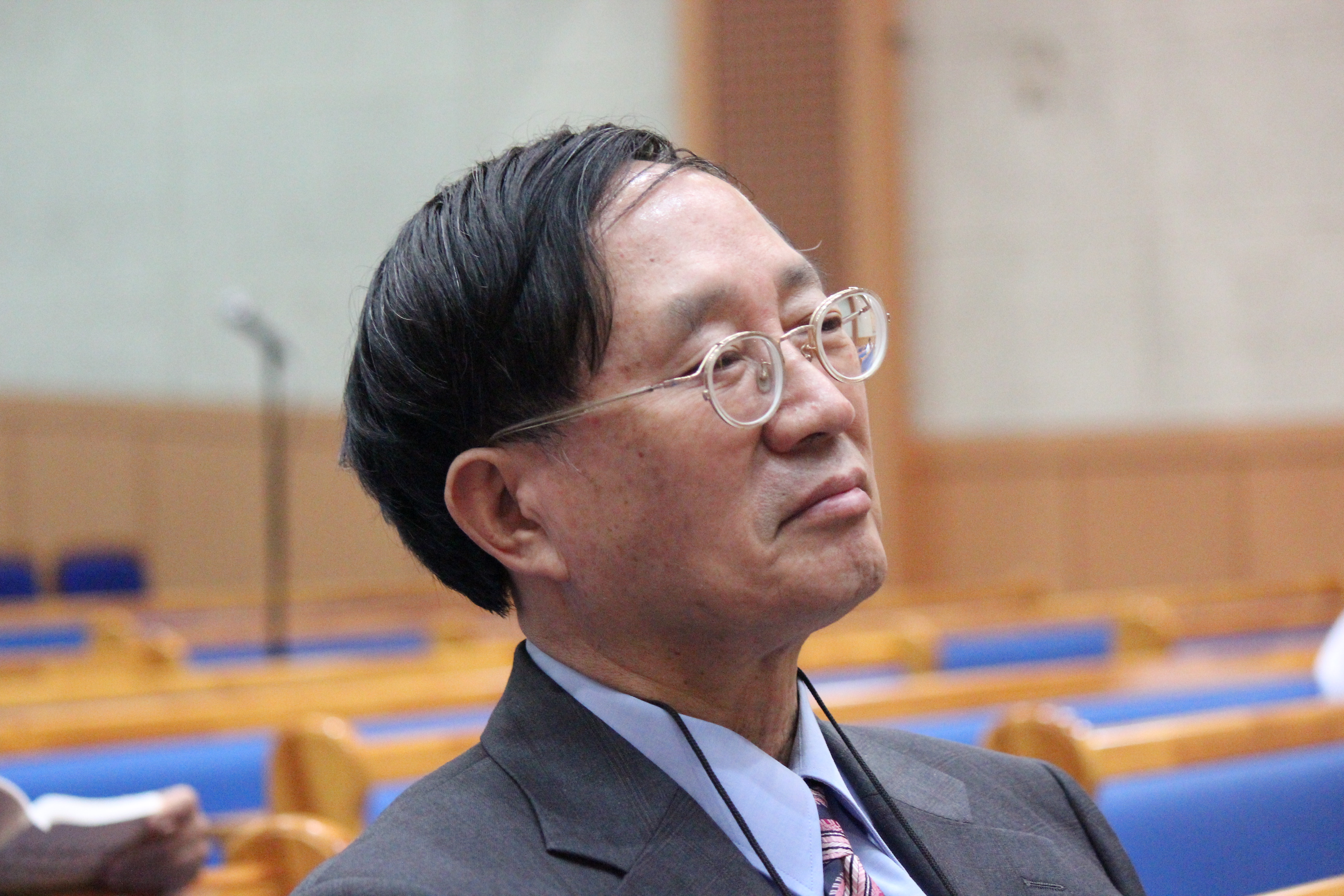
Professor Dr. Yung-Han Kim

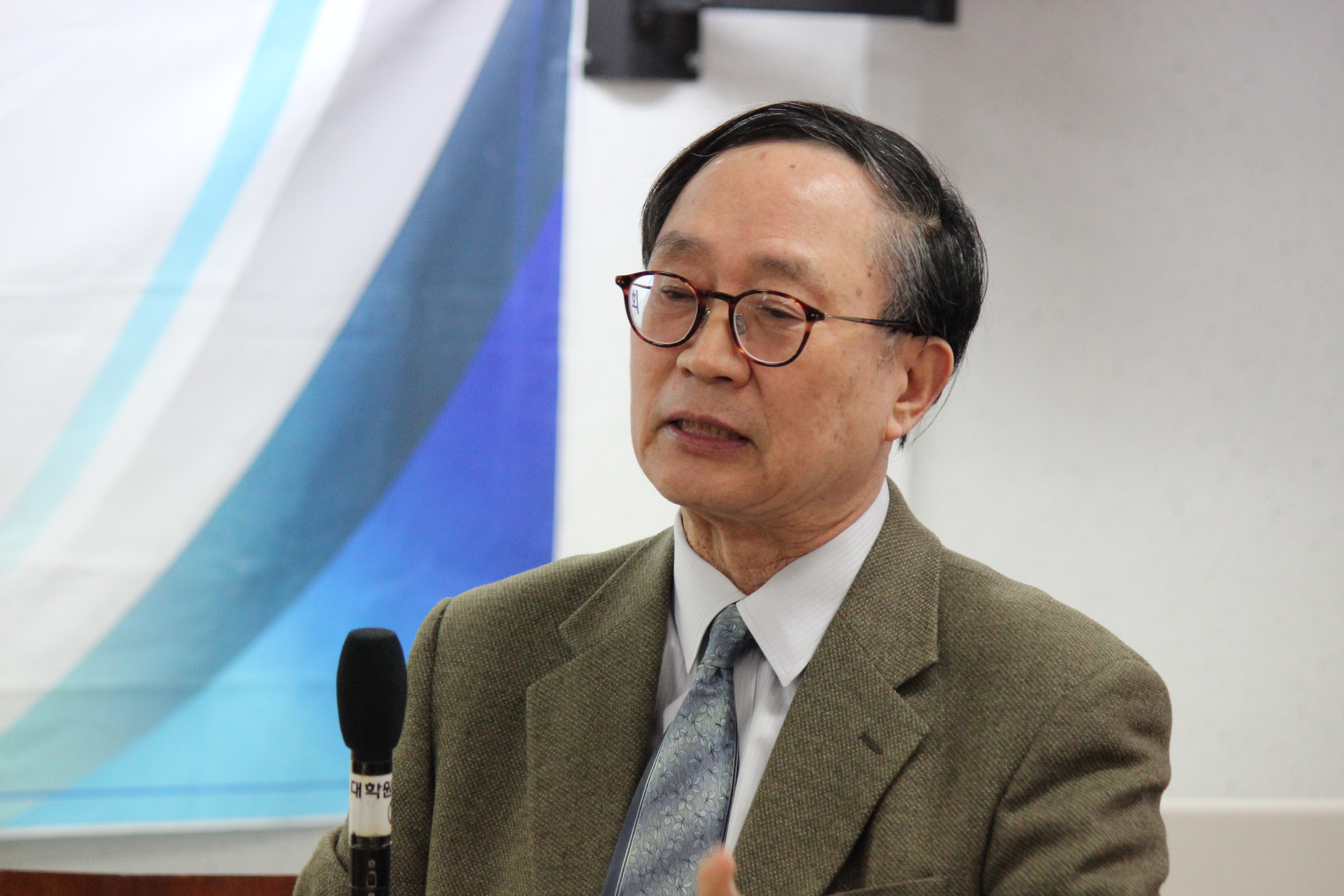
Dr. Yung-Han Kim in Backseok University

Yung-Han Kim (Korean: 김영한, 金英漢, b. October 18, 1946) is a South Korean theologian and ordained minister. He served for 34 years as professor of systematic theology and Christian Philosophy at Soongsil University.

He founded the Korea Reformed Theological Society in 1996, and served as the 1st, 2nd, 3rd president of the Society. He set up the Graduate School of Christian Studies in Soongsil University, served as the 1st, 2nd, 3rd, 5th and 6th Dean. Founder of Academia Christiana, he also has served as the president of Academia Christiana since 1988. He made the Shalomnabi, a civic organization, in 2010, has been serving as its chairman. He was a chairman of Korea Evangelical Theological Society, a chairman of Korea Society for Hermeneutics (2004–2006), a chairman of Christian Philosophy Society (2006–2012), and a chairman of Korea Reformed Theology Society.

He contributed more than 30 articles only in the Journal of Korea Evangelical Theological Society <Bible and Theology>. He published more than 20 books in Systematic Theology and Christian Philosophy, has been studying and contributing in the areas of dogmatics, reformed theology, modern theology, hermeneutics, Christian culture and Christian spirituality.

== Academic degrees ==
- Department of Philosophy, Seoul University (B. A. 1971),
- Graduate School of Philosophy, Seoul University,
- Philosophical Faculty, Heidelberg University, Germany (Dr. Phil. 1974),
- Theological Faculty, Marburg University, Germany (1975–1977, Research Fellow),
- Theological Faculty, Heidelberg University, Germany (Dr. Theol. 1984),

== Academic career ==
- Assistant Professor, Soongsil University, 1978–1982
- Associate Professor, Soongsil University, 1982–1987
- Senior Professor, Soongsil University, 1987–present
- Director of Korea Institute for Christian Culture Research, Soongsil University, 1986–2003
- Dean, Graduate School of Christian Studies, Soongsil University, Seoul, Korea, 1998–2003, 2005–2009
- Senior Professor, Department of Christian Studies, Soongsil University, 1999- 2012
- Senior Professor, Graduate School of Christian Studies, Soongsil University, Seoul, Korea, 1998–2012.
- Visiting Scholar, Princeton Theological Seminary, U. S. A. (1984–1985),
- Research Fellow, Divinity School, Yale University, U. S. A. (1990–1991),
- Visiting Scholar, Theological Faculty, Bochum University. (2004/3-2004/8),
- Visiting Scholar, Princeton Theological Seminary, U. S. A. (2004/9-2005/2),

== Pastoral career ==
- Ordination as a Minister of Jesus-Presbyterian Church (Tonghab) by the Seoul-South Presbytery, Korea (1980)
- Head Chaplain, Soongsil University, 1978–1982
- Associate Minister at Hallelujah Church, 1986–1989
- Head Chaplain, Soongsil University, 1999–2002
- Associate Minister at Seoul Presbyterian Church, 1992–2014

== Books ==
- Husserl und Natorp: zur Problematik der Letztbegründung der Philosophie bei Husserls Phänomenologie und Natorps Neukantianischer Theorie (Dr. Phil. Dissertation, Heidelberg, 1974) (written in German)
- Phänomenologie und Theologie: Studien zur Fruchtbarmachung des transzendental-phänomenologischen Denkens für das christlich-dogmatische Denken (Dr. Theol. Dissertation, Heidelberg, 1984)(written in German)
- The spiritual Challenge of the Twenty-First Century, Reformed Theology: Identity and Ecumenicity, Vol 1, eds., Wallace M. Alston Jr. and Mirchael Welker (Eerdmans: 2003), 3–19

== Articles in English ==
- “The 1st Century and 2nd Century of Soongsil", Asia in 21st Century and Christian University, 253–274, August 1998.
- "Gott in Husserls transzendental phänomenologischem Denken", Phänomenologie in Korea, Kah Kyung Cho und Jeon Sook Hahn (Hg.), Orbis Phaenomenologicus, Freiburg, München:Alber2001, 129–155.
- "The Tasks of Reformed Theology in the 21st Century from Korean Context",
- Bible and Theology, Vol. XXX, A Suggestion of Korea Evangelical Theology to Western Theology, Korea Evangelical Theological Society, 2001, 96–114,
- “The Idea of Transformed Hermeneutics", Evangelical Review of Theology, Editor: David Parker, Vol. 25, No. 3, July 2001, 196–209
- "A Suggestion of Korea Evangelical Theology to Western Theology", Bible and Theology Vol. XXX, A Suggestion of Korea Evangelical Theology to Western Theology, Korea Evangelical Theological Society, 2002, Word of Life Press, 6–11
- "The Identity of Reformed Theology and Its Ecumenicity in the Twenty-First Century: Reformed Theology as Transformational Cultural Theology", in: Reformed Theology:Identity and Ecumenicity, Wallace M. Alston & Michael Welker(Editors), Grand Rapids: Eerdmans, 2003, 3–19
- “The Unity and Diversity of Evangelicalism,” vol. 35, 17 p. Bible and Theology, Korea Evangelical Theological Society, 2004.4.25
- Christianity and Korean Culture: The Reasons for The Success of Christianity in Korea, EXCHANGE, Vol. 33, No. 2, E. J. Brill Academic Publishers, Netherlands, 2004.6.30, 132–152
- “The Culture of the 21st Century and Reformed Faith,” in: Korea Journal of Christian Studies, Vol 36, 31 October 2004, pp. 73–95
- Eine neue Theologie der Kultur in Korea, Zeitschrift für Evangelische Ethik, 50, Jg. Gütersloher Verlagahaus 2006, März, 60–69,
- “Reformed Evangelical Theology," in: International Journal of Christian Studies, Volume 1, 1 June 2006, Soongsil Graduate School of Christian Studies/Department of Christian Studies, Soongsil University, 2006, 13–34
- “The Identity of Theology and Its Scientificity," in: International Journal of Christian Studies, Volume III, I June 2007, Soongsil Graduate School of Christian Studies/ Department of Christian Studies, Soongsil University, 15–46
- “A Critical Reflection on Barth and van Til in the Reformed Tradition," in; International Journal of Christian Studies, Soongsil University, June 2008, 15–33,
- "Toward an Open Orthodox Reformed Theology; A Reflection of traditional Western Theology & desirable Theological Movement for Korean Church." in; A Theological Journal of KIMCHI, December 2009
