= Chongshin University =

Christian university in Seoul, South Korea

Coordinates: 37.488°N 126.966°E

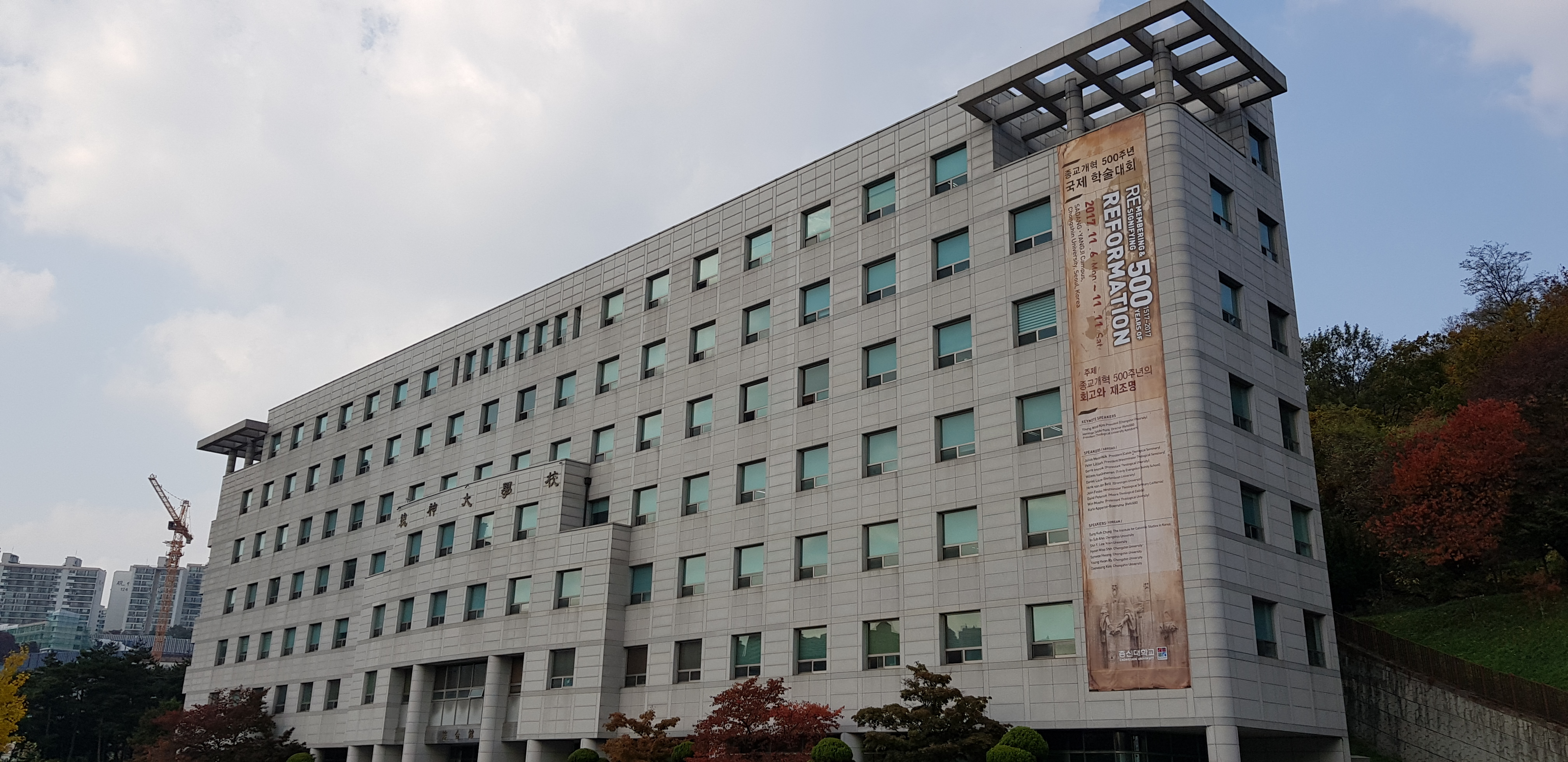

Korean name
- Hangul: 총신대학교
- Hanja: 總神大學校
- RR: Chongsin daehakgyo
- MR: Ch'ongsin taehakkyo

Chongshin University (Korean: 총신대학교) is a Christian university in Seoul, South Korea. It has deep historical ties to conservative Presbyterianism, reformed theology, and belongs to the Presbyterian Church in Korea (HapDong). The current president is Park Seong-gyu.

== Academics ==
Undergraduate education is provided through eight departments: Social Work, Child Studies, Church Music, Early Childhood Education, History Education, English Education, Christian Education, and Theology. Postgraduate education is divided between the seminary and the graduate schools. The main graduate school offers degrees of Master of Divinity (M.Div), Master of Theology (Th.M.), Master of Arts (M.A.), Master of Music (M.M.), Doctor of Theology (Th.D.) and Doctor of Philosophy (Ph.D.). In addition, there are separate graduate schools of Education, Mission, and Social Work.

== History ==
The school was founded as a seminary in 1901 by the Korean Presbyterian General Assembly. It was located in Pyongyang at the time, and known as Pyongyang Theological Seminary (평양 신학교). The first president was American missionary Samuel Austin Moffett. The school was forced to close by the Japanese occupation government in 1938. It was reopened in 1948, now located in Seoul. A four-year college was created in 1969. The seminary became an accredited graduate school in 1978. It became a university in 1995.

== See also ==
- List of colleges and universities in South Korea
- Education in South Korea
- Isu Station - also called Chongshin University Station
