= List of evangelical Christians =

This is a list of people who are notable due to their influence on the popularity or development of evangelical Christianity or for their professed evangelicalism.

== Historical ==
(This list is organized chronologically by birth)

- William Tyndale (c. 1494–1536), first published use of the term evangelical in English (1531)
- John Bunyan (1628–1688), persecuted English Puritan Baptist preacher and author of Pilgrim's Progress
- Jonathan Edwards (1703–1758), American Puritan theologian and preacher in the First Great Awakening
- John Wesley (1703–1791), English clergyman; founder of Methodism
- Charles Wesley (1707–1788), English clergyman; brother of John Wesley, hymnwriter of Methodism
- George Whitefield (1714–1770), English clergyman; early Methodist preacher and associate of John Wesley
- Isaac Backus (1724–1806), advocate of the separation of church and state
- Henry Venn (1725–1797), founder of the small, but highly influential Clapham Sect in Britain
- John Newton (1725–1807), English clergyman, author of Amazing Grace
- William Cowper (1731–1800), English poet/author of numerous hymns, including "There Is a Fountain Filled with Blood"
- Francis Asbury (1745–1816), founder of the Methodist Episcopal Church
- William Wilberforce (1759–1833), worked to abolish slavery in the British Empire
- Henry Thornton (1760–1815), banker, philanthropist, reformer and Member of Parliament
- Richard Allen (1760–1831), founder of the African Methodist Episcopal (AME) denomination (1816)
- William Carey, (1761–1834) British missionary to India. Known as the "father of modern missions"
- Nathan Bangs (1778–1862), editor of the Christian Advocate, president of Wesleyan University
- Charles Grandison Finney (1792–1875), preacher in the Second Great Awakening, advocate of "New Measures"
- Henry Venn (1796–1873), grandson of Henry Venn, pioneered the basic principles of indigenous church mission theory
- Robert Murray M'Cheyne (1813–1843), Scottish preacher and minister of St Peter's, Dundee
- Joseph M. Scriven (1819–1886), Irish poet, moved to Canada and wrote What a Friend We Have in Jesus
- William Henry Green (1825–1900), chairman of the Old Testament committee for the American Standard Version (1901)
- Robert Pearsall Smith (1827–1899) and Hannah Whitall Smith (1832–1911), leaders in the Holiness movement
- William Booth (1829–1912) and Catherine Booth (1829–1890), founders of The Salvation Army.
- James Hudson Taylor (1832–1905), British missionary to China and founder of the China Inland Mission
- Charles Spurgeon (1834–1892), English Baptist preacher and advocate of Calvinism
- Dwight L. Moody (1837–1899), American evangelist, pastor and educator

== Twentieth century ==
(This list is organized chronologically by birth)

- Fanny Crosby (1820–1915), blind American writer of many famous hymns including "Blessed Assurance"
- Alexander Maclaren (1826-1910), Scottish Baptist minister
- Joseph Parker (1830-1902), theologian, Congregationalist minister, pastor of City Temple
- Edward McKendree Bounds, (1835-1913), American author and member of the Methodist Episcopal Church South clergy
- Phineas F. Bresee, (1838–1915), founder of the Church of the Nazarene
- Albert Benjamin Simpson, (1843–1919), preacher, writer, founder of the Christian and Missionary Alliance
- Maria Woodworth-Etter (1844–1924), was an American healing evangelist. Her ministry style served as a model for Pentecostalism.
- William Mitchell Ramsay, (1851–1939), archaeologist known for his expertise in Asia Minor
- R. A. Torrey (1856–1928), American evangelist, pastor and educator and one of the founders of modern evangelical fundamentalism
- Oswald Thompson Allis (1856–1930), co-founder of Westminster Theological Seminary
- Robert Dick Wilson (1856–1930), linguist committed to defending the reliability of the Hebrew Bible
- Smith Wigglesworth (1859-1947), British evangelist, Pentecostal
- Charles Studd (1860–1931), missionary in China, India and the Congo, founder of WEC International
- Billy Sunday (1862–1935), American evangelist and proponent of Prohibition
- William Irvine (1863–1947), Scottish evangelist, founder of the Cooneyites and Two by Twos sects
- G. Campbell Morgan (1863-1945), British evangelist and pastor of Westminster Chapel
- Edward Cooney (1867–1960), evangelist and early leader of the Cooneyites and Go-Preachers sects
- Harry Ironside (1876–1951), evangelist and pastor of the Moody Church in Chicago (1930–48).
- Karl Barth (1886–1968), leader of dialectical theology and author of Church Dogmatics
- Toyohiko Kagawa (1888-1960), Japanese evangelist and social reformer
- Aimee Semple McPherson (1890–1944), Pentecostal preacher and founder of Foursquare Church
- Sadhu Sundar Singh (1889-1929?), Indian missionary
- Clarence Bouma (1891–1962), first president of the Evangelical Theological Society
- William F. Albright (1891–1971), ceramics expert, founder of the biblical archaeology movement
- Henri Lanctin (1892-1986), French Protestant evangelist active in Canada
- Donald Barnhouse (1895–1960), former pastor of Tenth Presbyterian Church, founder of Eternity magazine
- D.P. Thomson (1896–1974), Scottish evangelist, exponent of visitation and lay evangelism, Warden of the St Ninian's Training Centre, Crieff
- Aiden Wilson Tozer (1897–1963), preacher, author of The Pursuit of God and The Knowledge of the Holy
- Martyn Lloyd Jones (1899–1981), reformed preacher at Westminster Chapel
- Frank E. Gaebelein (1899–1983), founding headmaster of The Stony Brook School, general editor of the Expositor's Bible Commentary
- John Sung (1901-1944), Chinese evangelist
- Eric Liddell (1902-1945), 1924 Olympic Gold medalist, Scottish missionary to China
- Frank Jenner (1903–1977), English Australian evangelist
- Bakht Singh (1903-2000), pioneer of the Indian Church movement
- Harold Ockenga (1905–1985), first president of the National Association of Evangelicals
- James Gordon Lindsay (1906–1973), revivalist preacher, author, and founder of Christ for the Nations Institute
- Carl Fredrik Wisløff (1908–2004), theologian, professor in church history, preacher in Norwegian Lutheran Mission
- William M. Branham (1909–1965), preacher and prophet, pacesetter and initiator of the Tent Revival Era of the 1940s and 1950s
- Merrill Unger (1909–1980), Old Testament professor at Dallas Theological Seminary, defender of biblical inerrancy
- F. F. Bruce (1910–1990), apologist, one of the founders of the modern evangelical understanding of the Bible
- A. A. Allen (1911–1970), was a minister with a Pentecostal ministry, associated with the "Voice of Healing" movement.
- Francis Schaeffer (1912–1984), theologian, philosopher, founder of L'Abri, author of A Christian Manifesto
- Carl F. H. Henry (1913–2003), founding editor of Christianity Today
- Robert Pierce (1914–1978), founder of World Vision and Samaritan's Purse
- Bruce M. Metzger (1914–2007), biblical scholar and translator who served on the board of the American Bible Society
- Gleason Archer (1916–2004), theologian, educator, and author
- T. L. Osborn (1923–2013), American Pentecostal evangelist, singer, author, teacher and designer.
- D. James Kennedy (1930–2007), founder of Coral Ridge Presbyterian Church and Knox Theological Seminary
- Jerry Falwell (1933–2007), founder of Liberty University and the Moral Majority
- James Montgomery Boice (1938–2000), former pastor of Tenth Presbyterian Church.
- Greg Bahnsen (1948–1995), minister, educator, apologist, and a major figure in Christian Reconstructionism

== Contemporary ==
=== Bible scholars, philosophers, and theologians ===
- Gregory Beale, professor of New Testament and Biblical Theology at Reformed Theological Seminary and former president of the Evangelical Theological Society
- Craig Blomberg, New Testament scholar at Denver Seminary, author of How Wide the Divide? An Evangelical and a Mormon in Conversation
- Greg Boyd, theologian, author and senior pastor of Woodland Hills Church in St. Paul, Minnesota, and leading advocate of open theism.
- William Lane Craig, professor of philosophy at Talbot School of Theology, author of The Kalam Cosmological Argument
- Millard Erickson, former president of the Evangelical Theological Society, author of Christian Theology
- Gordon D. Fee, theologian, succeeded F.F. Bruce as editor of the New International Commentary on the New Testament, author of How to Read the Bible for All its Worth (co-authored with Douglas Stuart).
- Sinclair Ferguson, former editor of Banner of Truth Trust
- John Frame, theologian noted for his work in epistemology and presuppositional apologetics, author of The Doctrine of the Knowledge of God
- Norman Geisler, co-founder of Southern Evangelical Seminary, co-author of General Introduction to the Bible
- Timothy George, founding dean of Beeson Divinity School, executive editor for Christianity Today, former president of the Evangelical Theological Society
- Graeme Goldsworthy, Australian Anglican theologian
- Paula Gooder, British theologian and Canon Chancellor of St Paul's Cathedral.
- Wayne Grudem, co-founder of the Council on Biblical Manhood and Womanhood, author of Systematic Theology
- Gary Habermas, author, lecturer, and debater on the topic of the Resurrection of Jesus
- James K. Hoffmeier, archaeologist and Professor of Old Testament and Ancient Near Eastern History and Archaeology at Trinity Evangelical Divinity School.
- Karen Jobes, professor of New Testament Greek and Exegesis at Wheaton College, and first female president of the Evangelical Theological Society.
- Kenneth Kitchen, Egyptologist and author of On the Reliability of the Old Testament
- Craig Keener, Bible scholar, F. M. and Ada Thompson Professor of Biblical Studies at Asbury Theological Seminary
- Andreas Köstenberger, editor of the Journal of the Evangelical Theological Society
- Richard Longenecker, professor of New Testament at McMaster Divinity College
- John Warwick Montgomery, writer, lecturer and public debater in the field of Christian apologetics
- J. P. Moreland, professor of philosophy at Talbot School of Theology
- Thomas C. Oden, father of Paleo-Orthodoxy; theologian associated with Drew University
- J. I. Packer, theological editor for the English Standard Version, author of Knowing God
- Alvin Plantinga, University of Notre Dame, philosopher, Warrant and Christian Belief
- Frederick K. C. Price, founder and head pastor of Crenshaw Christian Center (CCC).
- Andrew Purves, Pittsburgh Theological Seminary
- Bong Rin Ro, theologian and missiologist
- Moisés Silva, former president of the Evangelical Theological Society
- R. C. Sproul, Reformed theologian, founder and chairman of Ligonier Ministries
- Elaine Storkey, British philosopher and theologian, author of numerous books on Christianity, feminism, gender, and women.
- John Stott, former Rector of All Souls Church, Langham Place
- Miroslav Volf, professor at Yale Divinity School
- Stephen H. Webb, professor at Wabash College
- Ben Witherington III, Amos professor of New Testament for Doctoral Studies at Asbury Theological Seminary and doctoral faculty at St. Andrews University
- Nicholas Wolterstorff, professor emeritus of philosophical theology, and Fellow of Berkeley College (Yale); author, Lament for a Son
- Edwin M. Yamauchi, former president of the Evangelical Theological Society

=== Pastors, preachers and evangelists ===
- Leith Anderson, pastor of Wooddale Church, president of the National Association of Evangelicals
- Jim Bakker, former Assemblies of God minister, host of the PTL Club, convicted federal fraud felon, and current end-of-days evangelical preacher
- Alistair Begg, pastor of Parkside Church, radio preacher of Truth for Life
- Reinhard Bonnke, evangelist and organizer of gospel crusades throughout Africa
- Francis Chan, former teaching pastor of Cornerstone Community Church
- Douglas Coe, leader of the Fellowship Foundation
- Mark Dever, pastor of Capitol Hill Baptist Church, founder of 9Marks Ministries
- Mark Driscoll, co-founder of Mars Hill Church, Acts 29 Network, and The Gospel Coalition
- D. G. S. Dhinakaran, evangelical preacher, founder of Jesus Calls Ministries and the Karunya University
- Steven Furtick, founding pastor and evangelist at Elevation Church in Charlotte, NC.
- Bill Gothard, founder of the Institute in Basic Life Principles who was later removed from ministry due to sexual misconduct allegations
- Billy Graham, evangelist and spiritual counselor to multiple U.S. presidents
- Craig Groeschel, founder and pastor of Life.Church
- Nicky Gumbel, pioneer of the Alpha course and vicar of Holy Trinity Brompton in London
- John Hagee, founder and senior pastor of Cornerstone Church in San Antonio, Texas
- Ted Haggard, former pastor of New Life Church in Colorado Springs, Colorado; former leader of the National Association of Evangelicals
- Jack W. Hayford, past president of the International Church of the Foursquare Gospel
- Gordon Hugenberger, former pastor of Park Street Church
- Johnny Hunt, past president of the Southern Baptist Convention and pastor of the First Baptist Church Woodstock, Georgia
- Bill Hybels, founder and former pastor of Willow Creek Community Church
- Harry R. Jackson Jr., senior pastor at Hope Christian Church in Beltsville, Maryland and Presiding Bishop of the International Communion of Evangelical Churches
- Peter Jensen, Anglican Archbishop of Sydney, Australia
- Phillip Jensen, Sydney Anglican
- Timothy J. Keller, pastor of Redeemer Presbyterian Church (NY City); author of The Reason for God
- Greg Laurie, pastor of Harvest Christian Fellowship and evangelist of Harvest Crusades
- Nicky Lee, creator of The Marriage Course, and associate vicar of Holy Trinity Brompton in London
- John MacArthur, pastor of Grace Community Church (California), editor of the MacArthur Study Bible, founder and president of The Master's Seminary
- James S. MacDonald (born 1960), American pastor, non-denominational Bible teacher, and author
- C. J. Mahaney, leader of Sovereign Grace Ministries
- J. Vernon McGee, pastor, Bible teacher, theologian, and radio minister
- John Piper, pastor of Bethlehem Baptist Church; author of Desiring God
- David Platt, pastor and president of the Southern Baptist Convention's International Mission Board
- Oral Roberts, founder of Oral Roberts University
- Philip Ryken, former pastor of Tenth Presbyterian Church, current president of Wheaton College
- Chuck Smith, founder of the Calvary Chapel fellowship of churches
- Andy Stanley, founder of North Point Community Church
- Charles Stanley, founder and president of In Touch Ministries
- Jimmy Swaggart, founder and president of Jimmy Swaggart Ministries
- Chuck Swindoll, pastor, founder and president of Insight for Living
- Gardner C. Taylor, known as "the dean of American preaching"
- Jack Van Impe, pastor and host of Jack Van Impe Presents
- Rick Warren, pastor of Saddleback Church, author of The Purpose Driven Life, The Purpose Driven Church
- Paul Washer, founder of HeartCry Missionary Society
- Justin Welby, Archbishop of Canterbury
- John Wimber, pastor and founder of the Association of Vineyard Churches

=== Authors and speakers ===
- Jerry Bridges, speaker with The Navigators (organization), author of The Pursuit of Holiness
- Tony Campolo, pastor, sociologist, author, public speaker and leader of the Red-Letter Christian movement
- Shane Claiborne, writer, political activist and leader of the Red-Letter Christian movement
- Charles Colson, founder of Prison Fellowship, author of Born Again
- James Dobson, psychologist, founder of Focus on the Family, author of Dare to Discipline
- Tony Evans, widely syndicated radio broadcaster
- Alex McFarland, apologist
- Louie Giglio, speaker and founder of Passion Conferences
- Charlie Kirk, American conservative political activist, radio talk show host, and founder of Turning Point USA
- Kent Hovind, dangers of evolution, scientific evidence for the Bible
- Sergei Kourdakov, former KGB agent who persecuted Christians in Russia, but converted and defected to Canada
- Tim Lahaye, dispensationalist novelist, author of Left Behind series
- Jeri Massi, author of the Christy Award-nominated Valkyries: Some Through the Fire
- Joyce Meyer, charismatic speaker, author of Battlefield of the Mind: Winning the Battle in Your Mind
- Chuck Missler, apologist, author, founder of Koinonia House Ministries
- Luis Palau, Argentinian evangelist
- Joni Eareckson Tada, author, radio host, and founder of Joni and Friends
- Jim Wallis, founder and editor of Sojourners Magazine, political activist and leader of the Red-Letter Christian movement
- David F. Wells, author of No Place for Truth or Whatever Happened to Evangelical Theology, motivator for The Cambridge Declaration
- Philip Yancey, Christianity Today editor, columnist, author of The Jesus I Never Knew and What's So Amazing About Grace
- Ed Young, writer, speaker, artist, and the founding and senior Pastor of Fellowship Church

=== Educators and professors ===
- Darrell Bock, former president of the Evangelical Theological Society
- Don Carson, professor at Trinity Evangelical Divinity School
- Barry Corey, president of Biola University
- W. A. Criswell, former president of the Southern Baptist Convention
- Ligon Duncan, president of the Alliance of Confessing Evangelicals
- Robert Godfrey, president of Westminster Seminary California
- Kenneth E. Hagin, Charismatic preacher and founder of RHEMA Bible Training College (RBTC)
- John D. Hannah, author and professor at Dallas Theological Seminary
- Irving Hexham, Professor of Religious Studies, University of Calgary
- D. Michael Lindsay, president of Taylor University
- R. Albert Mohler, Jr., president of Southern Baptist Theological Seminary in Louisville, Kentucky
- Richard Mouw, president of Fuller Theological Seminary
- Mark Noll, history professor at the University of Notre Dame
- Nicholas Perrin, president of Trinity International University
- Haddon Robinson, president of Gordon-Conwell Theological Seminary
- Phil Ryken, president of Wheaton College
- Klyne Snodgrass, professor at North Park Theological Seminary, author of Between Two Truths
- Chuck Swindoll, former president of Dallas Theological Seminary
- Donald Sweeting, president of Colorado Christian University
- Kevin Vanhoozer, professor at Trinity Evangelical Divinity School

=== Influencers and innovators ===
- Howard Ahmanson, Jr., philanthropist and financier of many evangelical organizations
- George Barna, directing leader of The Barna Group, a Christian research and training organization
- Bill Bright, founder of Campus Crusade for Christ
- Loren Cunningham, founder of Youth with a Mission (YWAM) and University of the Nations
- Stuart Epperson, co-founder and chairman of Salem Communications
- Franklin Graham, son of Billy Graham and leader of Samaritan's Purse
- Chip Ingram, founder and teaching pastor of Living on the Edge
- T. D. Jakes, pastor, author, filmmaker, and bishop of The Potter's House
- Richard Land, president of the Ethics & Religious Liberty Commission
- Frank Laubach, missionary, writer, developer of the "Each One Teach One" literacy program
- Joel Osteen, pastor of Lakewood Church in Houston, Texas
- John Osteen, founder and first pastor of Lakewood Church in Houston, Texas
- Tony Perkins, political activist and president of the Family Research Council
- Pat Robertson, founder of the Christian Coalition of America
- Jay Alan Sekulow, chief counsel for the American Center for Law and Justice (ACLJ)
- Danny Yamashiro, chaplain at Massachusetts Institute of Technology, scholar on American presidents and childhood trauma

=== Political figures ===
- John Ashcroft, former U.S. Attorney General and U.S. Senator from Missouri
- George W. Bush, former President of the United States
- Jimmy Carter, former President of the United States
- Ted Cruz, U.S. Senator from Texas
- Jim DeMint, former U.S. Senator from South Carolina
- Sherwin Gatchalian, President of the Senate of the Philippines
- Mike Huckabee, former Governor of Arkansas
- James Lankford, U.S. Senator from Oklahoma
- Sarah Palin, 2008 Republican vice presidential nominee and former Governor of Alaska
- Tim Pawlenty, former Governor of Minnesota
- Mike Pence, former Vice President of the United States
- Rick Perry, former U.S. Secretary of Energy and former Governor of Texas
- Ben Sasse, U.S. Senator from Nebraska
- John Thune, U.S. Senator from South Dakota
