= IFCA International =

Association of Protestant churches

- Classification: Protestant
- Orientation: Christian fundamentalist
- Headquarters: Grandville, Michigan
- Origin: June 1930
- Branched from: American Conference of Undenominational Churches

IFCA International, formerly the Independent Fundamental Churches of America, is an association of independent Protestant congregations and other church bodies, as well as individual members. It was formed in 1930 in Cicero, Illinois as a successor to the American Conference of Undenominational Churches. The association's name was adopted in 1996.

== Membership ==
IFCA International has nearly 1000 churches located largely in the United States and up to three times that number of associated churches in 26 countries outside the U.S. It also has over 1100 individual members: pastors, missionaries, professors, church planters, chaplains, and other vocational Christian workers. In the U.S there are five member colleges, 11 home mission agencies, and 12 church planting agencies. It also has 8 foreign mission agencies ministering outside the U.S.

== Beliefs ==
The association sees its roots in the rejection of theological modernism and the reaffirmation of the traditional, fundamental doctrines that it believes to underlie Biblical Christianity: Biblical inerrancy, the virgin birth of Christ, the substitutionary atonement of Christ, the literal resurrection of Christ, the Second Coming of Christ, the eternal joy of those who are redeemed by the blood of Christ through the regenerating work of the Holy Spirit, and the eternal judgment of those who are unredeemed. It also holds to the pretribulation Rapture of the Church and the premillennial return of Christ to establish his 1000-year reign on earth before the eternal state.

The shift to the use of initials rather than the original name reflects a rejection of much of fundamentalism and a rejection of any nationalist focus rather than a softening of its message. Nonetheless, it is doctrinally quite conservative, strongly rejecting ecumenism and what it construes as liberalism within Christianity.

=== Purpose statement ===
The IFCA International purpose statement is: "Enhancing the strength of the Church by equipping for, and encouraging toward, ministry partnerships to accomplish Great Commission objectives." Its organizational ambition is to become healthy churches who work together.

=== Core values ===
There are five IFCA International core values: Biblical Doctrine (contemporary importance of the historic Fundamentals), Biblical Leadership (Christ-like integrity, humility, zeal, and sacrifice), Biblical Outreach (evangelism at home and abroad), Biblical Partnerships (accomplishing more together than separately), Biblical Excellence (doing the best possible for God's glory).

== Organizational structure ==
IFCA International establishes an organizational structure to coordinate and encourage joint participation in ministry activities. IFCA International provides this while guaranteeing the autonomy of congregational government. The constitution and by-laws of IFCA International provide for a voluntary membership for churches, organizations and individuals. Membership is reaffirmed annually. Member churches may not join any denomination and continue to be member churches.

The association is administered by a paid executive director and home office staff in Grandville, Michigan. This staff is overseen by 12 unpaid, elected board of directors (who serve four-year terms) led by the president of the board who serves a four-year term. IFCA International holds an annual convention to decide on the issues before it. This convention rotates around the U.S. and has met in places such as Chicago, Detroit, Seattle, Los Angeles, York, PA, Schroon Lake, NY, Grand Rapids, Tacoma, Colorado Springs, St. Petersburg, Florida, Baltimore, Louisville, Tulsa, Eugene, and Springfield, IL.

Past executive directors have included William McCarrell, Nye J. Langmade, Ernest Pickering, Glen Lehman, Bryan Jones, Harold Freeman, and Richard I. Gregory. The previous executive director was Les Lofquist, who served for twenty years from 1999 to 2019 and serves on the faculty of The Shepherd's Seminary of Cary, NC. The executive director is Richard P. Bargas, a graduate of Biola University and The Master's Seminary and former pastor in Wilmington, CA and adjunct professor at The Master's Seminary. The president of the IFCA International board of directors is Steve Wong.

== Notable members ==
- J. Oliver Buswell, President of Wheaton College
- M. R. DeHaan, Calvary Undenominational Church, Grand Rapids; Radio Bible Class
- William McCarrell, Cicero Bible Church, Moody Bible Institute
- William Pettingill, Editorial Committee, Scofield Study Bible
- Louis Talbot, President of BIOLA
- Charles L. Feinberg, Academic Dean of Talbot Theological Seminary
- Lance Latham, Founder of AWANA Children's ministry, New Tribes Mission
- John Walvoord, President of Dallas Theological Seminary
- J. Vernon McGee, Church of the Open Door, Los Angeles; BIOLA; Radio ministry
- Merrill Unger, Dallas Theological Seminary
- Charles Caldwell Ryrie, Dallas Theological Seminary
- John F. MacArthur, Grace Community Church, Los Angeles; The Master's College & Seminary; Radio ministry
