= Ray Stedman =

American evangelical pastor (1917–1992)

Raymond Charles Stedman (October 5, 1917 – October 7, 1992) was an evangelical Christian pastor and author. He was a long-time pastor of Peninsula Bible Church in Palo Alto, California, and author of several books.

== Early life ==
Stedman worked in Montana, including a stint as a Brahman bull rider in rodeos.

In 1946, Stedman began attending Dallas Theological Seminary, befriending Howard Hendricks, and graduating in 1950.

Before moving in 1950 to the Peninsula Bible Fellowship in Palo Alto, California, to provide pastoral care, Stedman worked alongside J. Vernon McGee, a preacher widely known in evangelical circles for his radio ministry.

== Career ==
Peninsula Bible Fellowship became Peninsula Bible Church, with Stedman pastoring there for 40 years.

== Selected bibliography ==
- Adventuring Through the Bible: A Comprehensive Guide to the Entire Bible, by Ray C. Stedman and James D. Denney (hardcover 1997 Elaine Stedman; paperback 2005)
- Authentic Christianity: The Classic Bestseller on Living the Life of Faith With Integrity, by Ray C. Stedman (paperback 1996)
- Spiritual Warfare: Winning the Daily Battle With Satan, by Ray C. Stedman (paperback 1999)
- Joy of Living Bible Studies: Nehemiah, Job, Psalms of Faith, Prophecy in the Book of Daniel, Gospel of Mark Part 1 & Part 2, Acts, Romans, Ephesians and Revelation—commentary by Ray Stedman, with study questions by Nancy J Collins and/or Kathy G Rowland (spiral bound 2001 through 2012)
- Body Life: The Book That Inspired a Return to the Church's Real Meaning and Mission, by Ray C. Stedman (1995)
- The Way to Wholeness: Lessons from Leviticus, by Ray C. Stedman (paperback 2005 Elaine Stedman)
- Waiting for the Second Coming, by Ray C. Stedman
