= John D. Hannah =

American academic and author

- Born: c. 1940s
- Occupations: Biblical academic and writer
- Title: Distinguished Professor of Historical Theology, Research Professor of Theological Studies

Academic background
- Education: University of Texas at Dallas (PhD)
- Thesis: (1988)

Academic work
- Discipline: Biblical studies
- Institutions: Dallas Theological Seminary

John D. Hannah (born c. 1940s) is an author and professor at Dallas Theological Seminary. His official title is "Distinguished Professor of Historical Theology, Research Professor of Theological Studies." He served as the department chair of Historical Theology for over twenty years and has taught at DTS since 1972.

Hannah is also an adjunct professor of Church History at Redeemer Seminary. He is also a member of the Alliance of Confessing Evangelicals.

Hannah is a popular and frequent conference speaker in the U.S. and in other countries. His publications include journals, books, audio materials, and computerized works. Hannah also serves on the boards of several organizations.

== Education ==
- B.S., Philadelphia College of Bible (1967)
- Th.M., Dallas Theological Seminary (1971)
- Th.D. (1974)
- M.A., Southern Methodist University (1980)
- Ph.D., University of Texas at Dallas (1988)
- Postdoctoral study, Yale University (1993)

== Works ==
=== Books ===
- Hannah, John D. (1984). Inerrancy and the Church. Chicago, IL: Moody Press. ISBN 0-8024-0327-1.
- ——— (2000). To God Be the Glory. Today's Issues. Wheaton, IL: Crossway Books. ISBN 1-58134-171-7.
- ——— (2001). Guia Portavoz de la historia de la Iglesia (Student Guide to Church History) (Spanish ed.). Grand Rapids, MI: Editorial Portavoz. ISBN 0-8254-1053-3.
- ——— (2001). The Kregel Pictorial Guide to the History of the Church, Vol. 1. Grand Rapids, MI: Kregel Publications. ISBN 0-8254-2798-3.
- ——— (2001). Our Legacy: The History of Christian Doctrine. Colorado Springs, CO: Navpress Publishing Group. ISBN 1-57683-264-3.
- ——— (2001). Charts of Ancient and Medieval Church History. Zondervan Charts. Vol. 1. Grand Rapids, MI: Zondervan. ISBN 0-310-23316-X.
- ——— (2004). Charts of Reformation and Enlightenment Church History. Zondervan Charts. Vol. 2. Grand Rapids, MI: Zondervan. ISBN 0-310-23317-8.
- ——— (2004). Charts Of Modern And Postmodern Church History. Zondervan Charts. Vol. 3. Grand Rapids, MI: Zondervan. ISBN 0-310-23530-8.
- ——— (2005). The Kregel Pictorial Guide To Church History, Vol. 2: The Early Church, A.D. 33-500. Grand Rapids, MI: Kregel Publications. ISBN 0-8254-2783-5.
- ——— (2006). The Kregel Pictorial Guide to Church History, Vol. 3: The Triumph of the Church, A.D. 500-1500. Grand Rapids, MI: Kregel Publications. ISBN 0-8254-2784-3.
- ——— (2009). An Uncommon Union: Dallas Theological Seminary and American Evangelicalism. Grand Rapids, MI: Zondervan. ISBN 978-0-310-23786-0.
- ——— (2009). The Kregel Pictorial Guide to Church History, Vol. 4: The Reformation of the Church (The Early Modern Period), A.D. 1500-1650. Grand Rapids, MI: Kregel Publications. ISBN 978-0-825-42785-5.
- ——— (2011). The Kregel Pictorial Guide to Church History, Vol. 5: The Church in the Late Modern Period, A.D. 1650-1900. Grand Rapids, MI: Kregel Publications. ISBN 978-0-825-42786-2.
- ——— (2011). The Kregel Pictorial Guide to Church History, Vol. 6: The Church and Postmodernity, A.D. 1900-Present. Grand Rapids, MI: Kregel Publications. ISBN 978-0-825-42787-9.
- ——— (2012). How Do We Glorify God?. Basics of the Reformed Faith. Phillipsburg, NJ: P&R Publishing. ISBN 978-1-596-38082-0. revised edition of To God Be the Glory (2000)
- ——— (2015). Invitation to Church History - World. Invitation to Theological Studies). Grand Rapids, MI: Kregel Publications. ISBN 978-0825427756.
- ——— (2016). Invitation to Church History - American. Invitation to Theological Studies). Grand Rapids, MI: Kregel Publications. ISBN 978-0-825-44385-5.

=== Selected articles ===
- ——— (1977). "Doctrine of Original Sin in Postrevolutionary America". Bibliotheca Sacra. 134 (1): 238–256.
- ——— (1978). "Anselm on the Doctrine of Atonement". Bibliotheca Sacra. 135 (1): 333–344.
- ——— (1995). "The Scandal of the Evangelical Mind". Bibliotheca Sacra. 152 (1): 234–235.
- ——— (1997). "Church History: an Essential Guide". Bibliotheca Sacra. 154 (1): 502–503.
- ——— (2002). "The Place of Theology in the Postmodern World: Is the Study of Theology and History an Antiquated Discipline?". Reformation & Revival. 11 (1): 11–31.
