= Howard Hendricks =

American seminary professor

- Born: Howard George Hendricks; April 5, 1924; Philadelphia, Pennsylvania
- Died: February 20, 2013 (aged 88)
- Occupations: Seminary Professor, Speaker
- Writing career
- Subjects: Christian Education, Leadership, Bible Study Methods
- Website: www.dts.edu/howard-hendricks-tribute/

Howard George Hendricks (April 5, 1924 – February 20, 2013) was a longtime professor at Dallas Theological Seminary and speaker for Promise Keepers. Upon his graduation from Dallas, Hendricks accepted the pastorate at Calvary Independent Presbyterian Church (now Calvary Bible Church) in Fort Worth, Texas. An opening on the seminary staff led Hendricks to begin teaching twice per week in the fall of 1951. After one year on staff, Hendricks resigned his post to pursue a doctorate at Yale University. However, the founder and president of Dallas Theological Seminary, Lewis Sperry Chafer, died and the new president, John Walvoord, asked Hendricks to delay his doctorate and return to Dallas as a teacher.

For over fifty years, Howard G. Hendricks was a professor at Dallas Theological Seminary, where he taught "Bible Exposition and Hermeneutics" to freshmen. He mentored many Christian leaders, including Chuck Swindoll, Tony Evans, Joseph Stowell, Robert Jeffress, Chip Ingram and David Jeremiah.

He was a keynote speaker for Promise Keepers and authored sixteen books. He ministered in over 80 countries, and he also served as chaplain for the Dallas Cowboys football team from 1976 to 1984.

In 1986, the Howard G. Hendricks Center for Christian Leadership opened on the Dallas Theological Seminary campus. This ministry attempts to develop Christian leaders and future church curricula through a process of mentoring.

== Books ==
- Family Bible Library (1971) Board of Editorial Advisors
- Say It with Love (1972) ISBN 0-88207-050-9
- Elijah; Confrontation, Conflict, and Crisis (1972) ISBN 0-8024-2335-3
- Heaven Help the Home (1973, 2003) ISBN 0-89693-674-0
- Abraham an Unbelievable Believer (1978, Dallas Theological Seminary)
- Footprints: Walking through the Passages of Life (1981) ISBN 0-930014-55-3
- Taking a Stand: What God Can Do Through Ordinary You (1983) ISBN 0-88070-025-4
- Teaching to Change Lives (1987, 2003) ISBN 0-88070-969-3
- Husbands & Wives (1988) ISBN 0-89693-302-4
- Mastering Teaching (1991) ISBN 0-88070-440-3
- Living by the Book (1993, 2007) ISBN 0-8024-0816-8
- As Iron Sharpens Iron: Building Character in a Mentoring Relationship (1995, 1999) ISBN 0-8024-5631-6
- Standing Together: Impacting Your Generation (1995) ISBN 1-885305-31-1
- Values and Virtues: Two Thousand Classic Quotes, Awesome Thoughts, and Humorous Sayings (1997) ISBN 1-57673-086-7
- A Life of Integrity (1997, 2003, 2007)ISBN 1590523105
- The Christian Educator's Handbook on Teaching (1998) ISBN 0-8010-2179-0
- Color outside the Lines: A Revolutionary Approach to Creative Leadership (1998, 2002) ISBN 0-8499-1365-9
- Great Preaching (1999, The Preaching Library)

== Journal articles ==
- "Reaping the Rewards of Senior Ministry." Bibliotheca Sacra vol 157 is 628, 2000. 387-396.
- "Me, Myself, and My Tomorrows." Bibliotheca Sacra vol 157 is 627, 2000. 259-270.
- "Rethinking Retirement." Bibliotheca Sacra vol 157 is 626, 2000. 131-140.
- "The Other Side of the Mountain." Bibliotheca Sacra vol 157 is 625, 2000. 3-14.
- "Lord, Change My Children's Father." Fundamentalist Journal vol 5 is 2, 1986. 51-52.
- "A Shirt for Timmy : Teaching Children to Pray." Fundamentalist Journal vol 4 is 11, 1985. 53-54.
- "The Art of Family Living." Fundamentalist Journal vol 3 is 9, 1984. 39-41.
- "Preparing Young People for Christian Marriage." Bibliotheca Sacra vol 128 is, 1971. 245-262.
- "Review of 'Leading a Church School.'" Christianity Today vol 13 is, 1969. 31-32.
