= Lewis Sperry Chafer =

American theologian (1871–1952)

- Chafer, circa 1929
- Born: February 27, 1871; Rock Creek, Ohio, U.S.
- Died: August 22, 1952 (aged 81); Seattle, Washington, U.S.
- Occupations: Theologian, author
- Spouse: Ella Loraine Case (1896–1944)
- Parent(s): Thomas Chafer; Lomira Chafer

Lewis Sperry Chafer (February 27, 1871 – August 22, 1952) was an American theologian. He co-founded Dallas Theological Seminary with his older brother Rollin Thomas Chafer (1868–1940), served as its first president, and was an influential proponent of Christian Dispensationalism in the early 20th century. John Hannah described Chafer as a visionary Bible teacher, a minister of the gospel, a man of prayer with strong piety. One of his students, Charles Caldwell Ryrie, who went on to become a theologian and scholar, stated that Chafer was an evangelist who was also "an eminent theologian."

== Biography ==
=== Early life ===
Chafer was born in Rock Creek, Ohio to Thomas and Lomira Chafer and was the second of three children. His father, a parson, died from tuberculosis when Lewis was 11 years old, and his mother supported the family by teaching school and keeping boarders in the family home. Chafer attended the Rock Creek Public School as a young boy, and the New Lyme Institution in New Lyme, Ohio from 1885 to 1888. Here he discovered a talent for music and choir.

Chafer quit his studies at Oberlin to work with YMCA evangelist, Arthur T. Reed of Ohio. From 1889 to 1891, Chafer attended Oberlin College, where he met Ella Loraine Case. They were married April 22, 1896 and formed a traveling evangelistic music ministry, he singing or preaching and she playing the organ. Their marriage lasted until she died in 1944.

=== Ministry ===
Ordained in 1900 by a Council of Congregational Ministers in the First Congregational Church in Buffalo and in 1903 he ministered as an evangelist in the Presbytery of Troy in Massachusetts and became associated with the ministry of Cyrus Scofield, who became his mentor.

During this early period, Chafer began writing and developing his theology. He taught Bible classes and music at the Mount Hermon School for Boys from 1906 to 1910. He joined the Orange Presbytery in 1912 due to the increasing influence of his ministry in the south. He aided Scofield in establishing the Philadelphia School of the Bible in 1913. From 1923 to 1925, he served as general secretary of the Central American Mission.

When Scofield died in 1921, Chafer moved to Dallas, Texas to pastor the First Congregational Church of Dallas, an independent church where Scofield had ministered. Then, in 1924, Chafer and his friend William Henry Griffith Thomas realized their vision of a simple, Bible-teaching theological seminary and founded Dallas Theological Seminary (originally Evangelical Theological College). Chafer served as president of the seminary and professor of Systematic Theology from 1924 until his death. He died with friends while away at a conference in Seattle, Washington in August 1952.

In 1953, the newly built chapel was designated the Lewis Sperry Chafer Chapel after the recently passed leader.

During his life, Chafer received three honorary doctorates: Doctor of Divinity from Wheaton in 1926, Doctor of Letters from Dallas in 1942, and Doctor of Theology from the Aix-en-Province, France, Protestant Seminary in 1946.

Chafer had a tremendous influence on the evangelical movement. Among his students were Jim Rayburn, founder of Young Life (as well as many of Young Life's first staff members), Kenneth N. Taylor, author of The Living Bible translation, and numerous future Christian educators and pastors, including Howard Hendricks, J. Dwight Pentecost, Charles Caldwell Ryrie, J. Vernon McGee, and John Walvoord, who succeeded him as president of DTS.

=== Personality ===
Chafer was recognized among his friends and peers for his balanced, simple life. He was a well-spoken and relaxed leader and was not a fire and brimstone preacher. Chafer believed the basic truths for Christian living are found in Romans 5, a chapter which teaches about peace, grace, weakness, hope, sacrifice, love, and joy.

In recognition of this, Dallas Theological Seminary offers a commencement award, the Lewis Sperry Chafer Award, every year to the graduating master's student who: "in the judgment of the faculty because of his well‐balanced Christian character, scholarship, and spiritual leadership, best embodies and portrays the ideals of Dallas Theological Seminary." An additional award, the Lorrain Chafer Award, is awarded to the graduating international master's student who: "in the judgment of the faculty, best evidences well‐balanced Christian character, scholarship, and spiritual leadership."

The Dallas Seminary Foundation has also set up a charitable giving program called the Lewis Sperry Chafer Legacy, recognizing the graciousness in Chafer's life.

== Theology ==
Chafer is widely recognized as one of the founders of modern Dispensationalism and was vehemently opposed to covenant theology. Yet, he did not reject the idea of a covenant of redemption, covenant of works, and covenant of grace. He affirmed all three along with the Edenic, Adamic, Noahic, Abrahamic, Mosaic, Palestinian, Davidic, and New Covenant. He was a premillennial, pretribulational dispensationalist. His overall theology could be generally described as based on the inductive study of the entire Bible, having similarities to John Nelson Darby of the Plymouth Brethren, a mild form of Keswick Theology on Sanctification, and Presbyterianism, all of these tempered with a focus on spirituality based on simple Bible study and living.

Chafer's theology has been the subject of much study and debate in and out of the theological community since his death, especially on the two larger topics of dispensationalism and Christian Zionism, specifically that the Jews are a people called unto God with a separate historical purpose and plan from the Church. Chafer held much in common with Free Grace theology and influenced many of its later advocates. Similarly to Charles Ryrie, Chafer defined repentance as being a mere synonym for faith, denying that it refers to sorrow for sin.

Lewis Sperry Chafer affirmed the doctrine of the eternal generation of the Son, arguing that eternal generation is implied by many passages of the Bible, such as those referring to the begottenness of the Son. He also believed that in the work of redemption, there exists a subordination of order in the trinity where the Father sends the Son but not vice versa. He believed that this order is grounded in the eternal generation of the Son, not by any essential divine attributes.

== Writings ==
1993 reprint of Chafer's Systematic Theology

In 1933, Dallas acquired the periodical Bibliotheca Sacra and began publishing it in 1934. Chafer wrote about 70 articles for this journal (see external links below).

In 1947, after 10 years of work, he completed his Systematic Theology in eight volumes. This was the first time that a premillennial, dispensational framework of Christian theology had been systematized into a single format. The books were so popular that it sold out the first printing in six months and needed a third printing within two years. The series has been printed many times since by a number of publishing houses.

Chafer's Systematic Theology is a standard dispensational systematic theology at Dallas Theological Seminary. Lewis Sperry Chafer wrote, "These pages represent what has been, and is, taught in the classrooms of the Dallas Theological Seminary". It has been claimed that "This is the definitive work to use in understanding what Dispensationalism teaches and believes. If you are going to use “straw men” to defeat dispensational theorists, make sure your scarecrow favors Lewis Sperry Chafer."

== Selected publications ==
Many of Chafer's books have been reprinted multiple times by several different publishing houses. Some of these include:

- True Evangelism, 1911
- The Kingdom in History and Prophecy, 1915.
- Salvation: A Clear Doctrinal Analysis, 1917. Reprint, 1955. ISBN 0-310-22351-2
- Seven Biblical Signs of the Times, 1919
- He That is Spiritual, 1918. Reprint, 1967. ISBN 0-310-22341-5
- True Evangelism: Winning Souls by Prayer, 1919. Reprint, 1978. ISBN 0-310-22381-4
- Satan: His Motive and Methods, 1919. Reprint, 1964. ISBN 0-310-22361-X
- Must We Dismiss the Millennium? 1921
- Grace: The Glorious Theme, 1922. Reprint, 1950. ISBN 0-310-22331-8
- Major Bible Themes, 1926. Reprint, 1974. ISBN 0-310-22390-3
- The Epistle to the Ephesians, 1935. Reprint, 1991. ISBN 0825423422
- Systematic Theology, 1947. Reprint, 1993. ISBN 0-8254-2340-6

His Systematic Theology includes, practically word-for-word, some of his other works.
