= Michael J. Easley =

American college administrator

- Born: 1957; Atlanta, GA
- Education: Masters of Theology, Dallas Theological Seminary (1985), Doctorate of Ministry from DTS (2003)
- Known for: President of Moody Bible Institute
- Spouse: Cindy in 1980
- Website: http://michaelincontext.com/

Michael J. Easley (born 1957) is the president and host of "Michael Easley inContext" a ministry designed to help listeners and readers "understand God's word and apply it to your life". He was the former president of the Moody Bible Institute (MBI) in Chicago, Illinois. He has served in churches in Texas, Northern VA/ Washington, DC, and Middle Tennessee.

== Life and career ==
Both Michael and his wife, Cindy, earned B.S. Ed. degrees from Stephen F. Austin State University. Michael and Cindy married in 1980 and have four adult children. He earned his Master of Theology at Dallas Theological Seminary in 1985 and earned a Doctorate of Ministry from Dallas Seminary in 2003. In recognition of his doctoral work, Michael received the John G. Mitchell Award for outstanding scholarship and effectiveness in ministry.

Before becoming president of the Moody Bible Institute, Easley served as a pastor for twenty-four years, beginning as a youth pastor intern at Trinity Fellowship in Dallas, Texas. He served as senior pastor at Grand Prairie Bible Church in Texas for almost nine years and then at Immanuel Bible Church in Springfield, Virginia, for eleven and a half years. Michael and Cindy were part of the speaker team with Family Life's "Weekend To Remember" marriage conferences for over fifteen years.

In 2005, Easley became the president of the Moody Bible Institute. He hosted two radio programs sponsored by Moody: a weekly broadcast Moody Presents and a Monday-Friday program inContext. The latter program debuted on May 5, 2008. Easley authored Interludes: Prayers And Reflections Of A Servant's Heart and contributed to The Da Vinci Code Controversy by Dillon Burroughs. He has also stood against the TNIV's gender inclusive language.

On May 16, 2008, Easley resigned from Moody due to continuing back troubles, which he felt were impeding his abilities to be an effective president. His successor, Dr. Paul Nyquist, became the ninth president of Moody Global Ministries on October 23, 2009.

Easley served as an Elder and the Senior Teaching Pastor at Fellowship Bible Church, Nashville from January 2009 until August 2017. He founded Stonebridge Bible Church in 2018 where he serves as Lead Pastor in the greater Nashville, TN area.

He has been a guest on many media outlets, appeared on The John Ankerberg Show, is a frequent conference speaker, writes a monthly column for HomeLife Magazine and leads annual tours to Israel.

== Works ==
- Interludes: Prayers And Reflections Of A Servant's Heart, ISBN 0-8024-4708-2
- The Da Vinci Code Controversy, ISBN 0-8024-4859-3
