= Stonebriar Community Church =

Coordinates: 33.119051°N 96.812327°W

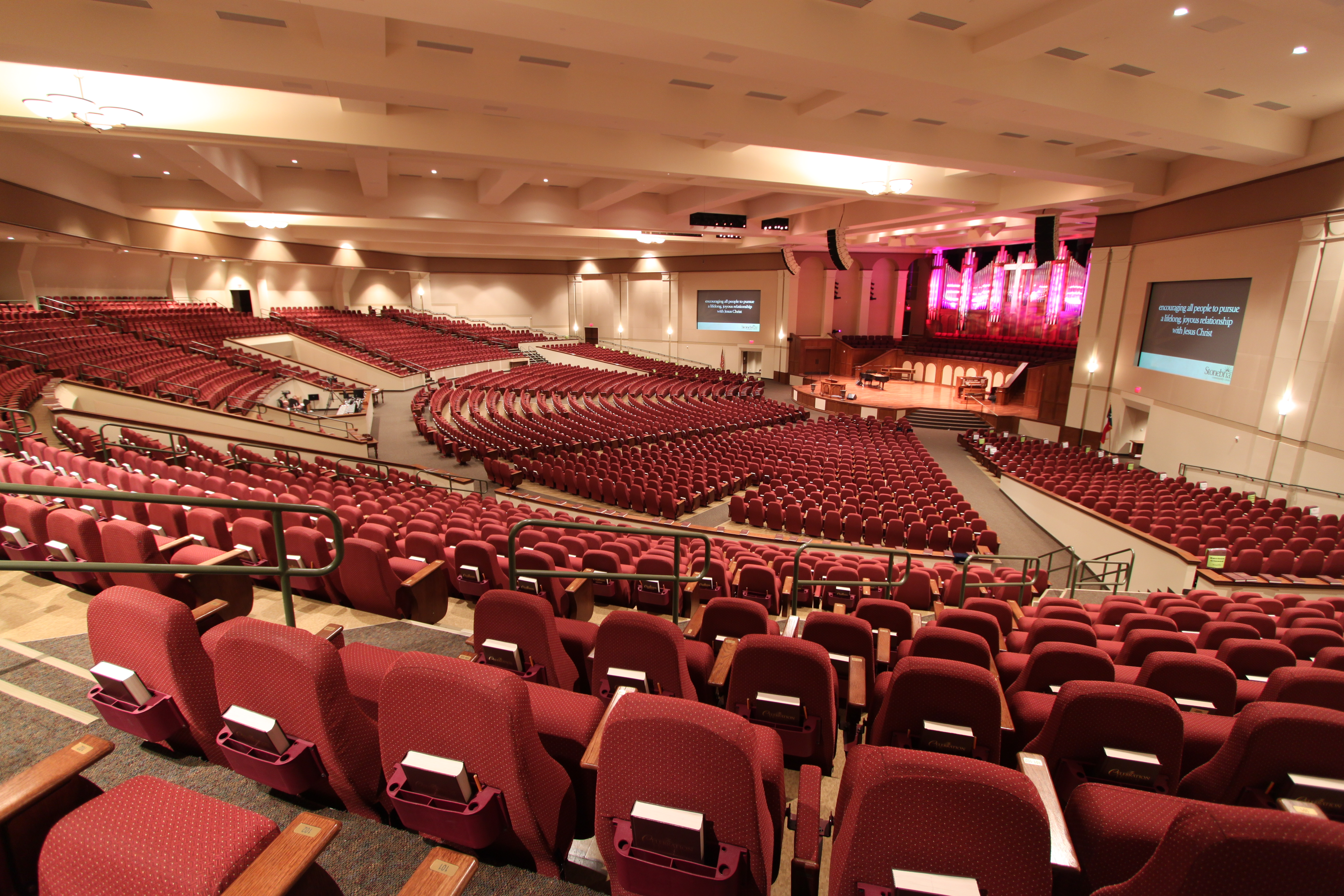
- Interior of the Stonebriar Community Church, 2009.
- Stonebriar Community Church
- Location: Frisco, Texas
- Country: United States
- Denomination: Non-Denominational, Evangelical Christian
- Website: www.stonebriar.org

History
- Status: Active
- Founded: 1998
- Founder: Chuck Swindoll

Stonebriar Community Church is a nondenominational evangelical megachurch in Frisco, Texas, a northern suburb of Dallas, Texas.

== History ==
Stonebriar Community Church was founded in 1998 by pastor Chuck Swindoll. Within its first year, the church quickly grew into a popular new congregation in Frisco, Texas. By early 1999, approximately 1,500 people were attending Sunday worship services at the church’s temporary location on the Preston Ridge campus of Collin College. Contemporary newspaper reports described the church as an “instant success” and noted that many early attendees were listeners of Swindoll’s radio program Insight for Living, reflecting the influence of his ministry and radio audience on the church’s rapid growth.

By the end of 1999, the church had established a number of ministries and programs to serve its growing congregation, including children’s and youth programs, adult Bible studies, and outreach initiatives. Attendance continued to rise, and the congregation began planning for a permanent campus to accommodate the increasing number of members. Local news coverage from this period highlighted the church as one of the fastest-growing new congregations in the Dallas–Fort Worth area.

In 2001, the church opened the doors of a new 100,000-square-foot (9,300 m^{2}) building. By 2005, Sunday attendance was averaging 4,000 adults and 1,200 children, prompting the church to begin planning another building expansion. Construction of a new worship center was completed in the fall of 2008, making room for 3,000 people at each worship service. In 2002, Stonebriar identified Chhattisgarh, a state in central India, as its strategic missions focus. The church’s goal is to train 1,000 national pastors, build 1,000 churches, and see 500,000 people become Christians in 10 years. By 2006, 280 men and women had earned theology diplomas, and 230 national pastors were leading 750 churches and home groups with a total of 20,000 members.

In May 2024, Stonebriar Community Church formally transitioned its senior pastoral leadership when Chuck Swindoll, the church’s founding pastor, assumed the title of Founding Pastor and Dr. Jonathan Murphy, a seminary professor and experienced preacher, became Senior Pastor. The transition followed several years of planning and mentorship, with Murphy previously serving as a guest preacher at the church and as Department Chair and Professor of Pastoral Ministries at Dallas Theological Seminary. At the time of the transition, Stonebriar reported weekly attendance of approximately 3,700 in-person participants and over 11,000 online worshippers across more than 50 countries, with more than 180 active ministries. Swindoll continued preaching at the church through October 2024 and preached his final sermon that month, marking his retirement from pastoral ministry to focus on his international radio ministry, Insight for Living, and other teaching responsibilities. This transition marked the official retirement of Swindoll from day-to-day pastoral duties while maintaining his ongoing ministry work.
