= Merrill Unger =

American Biblical commentator, scholar, archaeologist and theologian (1909–1980)

Merrill Frederick Unger (1909–1980) was an American Bible commentator, scholar, archaeologist, and theologian. He earned his A.B. and Ph.D. degrees at Johns Hopkins University, and his Th.M and Th.D degrees at Dallas Theological Seminary. He was a prolific writer who authored some 40 books. Unger was also a well known Biblical archaeologist and encyclopedist. Early in his career he was identified as a Baptist, but later was credentialed by the Independent Fundamental Churches of America (IFCA).

== Education ==
For a time, he attended Southern Baptist Theological Seminary in Louisville, Kentucky, before transferring to the Evangelical Theological College, later Dallas Seminary. At Dallas he was a protege of Lewis Sperry Chafer, bible teacher and founding president of the Seminary. Unger's Th.M. thesis was published as The Baptizing Work of the Holy Spirit (1953), and his Th.D. dissertation was published as Biblical Demonology (1952). The evangelist Billy Graham considered this work an authority on the subject.

He later received a Ph.D. from Johns Hopkins under the Near Eastern historian and archaeologist, William F. Albright. Unger's Johns Hopkins dissertation was published as Israel and the Arameans of Damascus (1957).

== Professional life ==
After serving as a pastor at several churches (e.g. Buffalo, New York), Unger taught for a year at Gordon College. For the next 19 years (1948–1967) Unger was professor of Old Testament studies at Dallas Theological Seminary after which time he became professor emeritus.

In retirement Dr. Unger led Bible conferences and wrote on Old Testament, theological and practical topics. He became again interested in demonology and a Christian response to the occult and Bishop James Pike, publishing Demons in the World Today (1971).

== Personal life ==
After retiring from Dallas Seminary due to health concerns and the loss of his first wife, Unger returned to his native Maryland where he and his second wife, Pearl, bought "Birdhaven," an arboretum estate on the Magothy River near Severna Park in Anne Arundel County. He was survived by two adopted children, a son, Clark, and a daughter, Shelley.

== Selected works ==
- Archaeology and the Old Testament, 1954
- Israel and the Aramaeans of Damascus: A Study in Archaeological Illumination of Bible History (1957)
- Archaeology and the New Testament, 1962
- Unger's Bible Handbook, 1966
- The Haunting of Bishop Pike (1971)
- New Testament Teaching on Tongues: A Biblical and Historical Survey (1971)
- Unger's Commentary on the Old Testament, 1981
- Unger's Bible Dictionary
- Baptism and Gifts of the Holy Spirit (Moody Press)
- Demons in the World Today (Tyndale House Publishers)
- Starlit paths for Pilgrims Feet
- The God-filled Life
