= Paws & Tales =

Christian children's media franchise

- Running time: 30 minutes
- Country of origin: United States
- Language: English
- Created by: David Carl, Chuck Swindoll (Insight for Living)
- Original release: 2001 – present
- Website: Paws & Tales

Paws & Tales (also known as The Wildwood Adventures) is a Christian children's radio drama, animated series, and online games website created by Insight for Living and Chuck Swindoll. Based upon the book Paw Paw Chuck's Big Ideas in the Bible, by Chuck Swindoll and Ross Vera,which have sold more than 100,000 hardcover copies. It first aired on radio in 2001, and in 2004 and 2005, the first two episodes were adapted into computer animation and was released onto VHS and DVD. As of March 2024, 74 audio episodes have been produced. It is broadcast on 450 outlets throughout North America.

== Setting ==
Paws & Tales is set in the fictional town of Wildwood, at the base of Wild Mountain and about two miles east of the "Bay of Tranquility". The characters are all anthropomorphic animals, and the technology level is about equivalent to the early 20th century. (Despite the Child Characters' more contemporary clothing.) The central characters are a group of children named "The Club" – C.J., Staci, Ned, Gooz, and Marsha – and their clubhouse, "The Fortress".

== Main characters ==
Paw Paw Chuck (grizzly bear) – Wildwood's handyman, whose day-to-day trade is done at Paw Paw's Fix-it-Shop. His main occupation, though, is providing guidance and spiritual wisdom to the townspeople of Wildwood. He has been married to Nana Cindy for almost 30 years. Having no grandchildren of their own, they have become "adopted" grandparents to many of the kids of the town. In addition to his firm moral conviction, he also possesses great physical strength and courage.

Chancellor James "C.J." Brown (brown bear) – The central character for most of the stories. C.J. is a gregarious, fun-loving bear cub who loves to be in charge. However, he can be a general buzzkill and that often leads to arguments and trouble for those around him. Also, he can also be secretive and tends to keep things all to himself, which also leads to trouble. Unlike all the other cubs, he has heterochromia—he has one blue eye on his left—through which he has trouble seeing clearly. He's a sensitive, vulnerable cub who has sought to make the most of his disability by making himself the butt of his own jokes.

Staci Clemmer (brown bear) – A dramatic, rough-and-tumble cub who's as brave as a lion—afraid of nothing. She has a keen sense of humor, but unlike C.J., she has a more difficult time laughing at herself. She would always try to take charge, which also causes problems and leads to trouble for those around her. But, she is an excellent problem solver. She often welcomes new settlers to Wildwood with a plate of homemade chocolate-chip cookies.

Ned Cleaver (beaver) – C.J.'s best friend, a beaver and the smartest one of the bunch. His intellect is also occasionally a stumbling block. He and C.J. finish each other's sentences and stick together as the only boys in The Club.

Pinkie Gongoozler (weasel) – Nicknamed "Gooz", she is an insatiably curious weasel girl and fascinated by anything out of the ordinary, so she is easily distracted. Her off-the-wall observations keep the members of The Club on their toes. Gooz is also a very talented artist, who, beneath her goofiness, has great wisdom and insight. She is from a large family that is not financially well-off, but that does not stop her from seeing the best in life and others. Her siblings include Willie, Ricky, Francie, and at least two others. However, she can be quick to new things.

Marsha Moffet (moose) – A young moose calf in the middle of a terribly awkward growth spurt—she's all legs and not much grace, but is the most mature of the kids. Marsha is the most tenderhearted of the bunch, and accordingly, she has compassion to spare. She is also a championship-level speller.

== Other characters ==
Nana Cindy (grizzly bear) – Paw-paw Chuck's wife.

Pastor Flint (grizzly bear) – The minister of the local church (of no specified denomination), he is also Cindy's father and father-in-law of Paw-Paw Chuck.

Timothy Owl (hoot owl) – A shifty character who often causes trouble for C.J. and the others by giving bad or misleading advice. Timothy is usually instigated by his "boss"; who is a shadowy character that lives in a nearby cave and seems to have sinister plans for the kids and the town. Timothy is clearly afraid of his boss, and the reason why he serves him is not clear.

Miss Harbor (deer) – The kids' school teacher, noted for her devotion to being a good educator, and her sometimes unorthodox teaching style which included once teaching History while wearing a suit of armour.

Miss Helga Grissel (wolf) – Miss Harbor's former teacher, who sometimes substitutes for her. Unlike Miss Harbour, she is unfriendly oftentimes and very strict, therefore she is unpopular with the kids. Years ago, she had been forced to leave the school after being falsely accused in an incident involving a student. However, thanks to the newfound kindness of the kids, she regains her former niceness and gains their love, trust, and respect.

Mrs. Collins (bear) – A widow who lives in a large mansion with many rooms. Her husband has been a famous archaeologist who brought back many artifacts from his expeditions, most of which are uncatalogued and stored in several rooms of the house. The kids are often allowed in to explore and examine the artifacts. She is unaware of the two rats who live among the collection.

Hugh McClaw (wildcat) – One of the kids' schoolmates, and a bully, who takes particular pleasure in teasing C.J. about his bad eye, calling him "Cyclops". He is confused about the club's devotion to their faith, though on at least one occasion he did consider joining the club, but eventually declined. It is hinted that Hugh may have a troubled home life that may contribute to his bullying behavior.

Tiffany Rockler – Another schoolmate, Tiffany is the daughter of Mr. Rockler, the richest man in town. Tiffany is vain, egotistical and insensitive, and she frequently tries to use her family's money and social status, both as an excuse and to get what she wants. The truth is, she is not in the good side, so she's on shaky ground. Tiffany has a lot of growing up to do.

Mr. Bentley Rockler - The only millionaire in Wildwood, he has many business interests, including the railroad. He is also C.J.'s father's employer. However, he can be foolish, selfish, thoughtless, and quick to anger at times, so he needs to work on changing his bad habits for good, and spend more time with his family.

Ezra (sheepdog) – A sheepherder who lives outside of town, and an old friend of Paw-paw Chuck.

Captain Gus – The captain of a trade ship that stops periodically in Wildwood. A wise old salt, and a talented storyteller.

Captain Horatio (walrus) – The lighthouse keeper, a retired ship Captain.

Officer Hunt (dog) – A policeman.

Mrs. Clemmer (brown bear) – Staci's Mom

Mrs. Nancy Brown (brown bear) - CJ's Mom

Mr. Theo Brown (brown bear) - CJ's Dad

== Audio episodes ==
The radio series was produced in California from 1998 until 2001 when Insight for Living moved its facilities to Plano, Texas. Soon after, many characters were re-cast with Texas-based talent. The producers chose not to re-cast some characters and continued to work with the original voice actors. The following is an incomplete list of actors in the roles they played in the radio series:

Narrator – David Heath
C.J. Brown – Ian Redford, Ayden Smalling, Cayman Mitchell
Staci Clemmer – Aubrey Martin, Cherami Leigh
Ned Cleaver – Eric Baesel
Pinkie "Gooz" Gongoozler – Susan Clausen
Marsha Moffet - Chris Anthony, Linda Marie Ford
Paw Paw Chuck – David King
Hugh McClaw - Joseph Narducci, Earl Fisher
Mange – Rick Robertson
Mayor Boggs – Scott Woods, John Galt
Miss Harbor – Kimberly Miller, Katy Gray-Jackson
Molty – Larry Brantley
Mr. Crawford – Steve Bridges
Mr. Rockler – John Galt
Mrs. Collins - Bonnie Bailey Reed
Officer Hunt - Jerry Woods
Theo Brown – Steve Bridges
Tiffany Rockler - Hannah Bickel Ferguson
Timothy Owl - Jerry Houston

== Animated series ==
Paws & Tales, the Animated Series are a series of animated videos by Providential Pictures, a division of Cloud Ten Pictures; the first two CGI episodes entitled "Seeing the Unseen" and "A Closer Look" were produced in 2004 and 2005, starring Cherami Leigh as Staci Clemmer. From 2007 to 2008, 26 Flash Animated episodes were adapted from the radio shows and 10 episodes have been released on DVDs. In 2009 Paws & Tales, the Animated Series aired on the Miracle Channel and CTS TV. In 2010, Paws & Tales the Animated Series began airing on TBN and Smile of a Child. Animated episodes were produced by Cliff McDowell.

This is a list of the episodes on DVD:

- Paws & Tales, the Animated Series: Seeing the Unseen (2004)
- Paws & Tales, the Animated Series: A Closer Look (2005)
- Paws & Tales, the Animated Series: The Good Shepard & A Good Foundation (2007)
- Paws & Tales, the Animated Series: If the Tooth be Know & High Noon (2007)
- Paws & Tales, the Animated Series: Miss Helga Grissel & Grace to Hugh (2007)
- Paws & Tales, the Animated Series: A Race Against Time & The Hire Principle (2007)
- Paws & Tales, the Animated Series: True Riches & Every Good Thing (2007)
- Paws & Tales, the Animated Series: The Gift & Grow Your Gifts (2007)
- Paws & Tales, the Animated Series: To Have and Give Not & And Then There Were None... (2007)
- Paws & Tales, the Animated Series: The Hullabaloo at Hunker Hill & The Great Go-Kart Race (2008)
- Paws & Tales, the Animated Series: Tiffany Cometh & The Tribe (2008)
- Paws & Tales, the Animated Series: Correction Course & Whose Name is Jealous? (2009)
- Paws & Tales, the Animated Series: Snake Oil & Eye of the Tiger (2009)
- Paws & Tales, the Animated Series: The Princess & CJ Prospers (2010)
- Paws & Tales, the Animated Series: Staci's Dilemma & The Honey Principle (2010)

== Cast ==
The voice cast from the animated series:

Narrator – David Heath
C.J. Brown – Braeden Soltyl
Staci Clemmer – Jessica Tyler
Ned Cleaver – Eric Baesel
Pinkie "Gooz" Gongoozler – Ashley Botting
Marsha Moffet - Chrishon Gambarotto
