= J. Dwight Pentecost =

American Christian theologian

John Dwight Pentecost
- Born: April 24, 1915; Pennsylvania, U.S.
- Died: April 28, 2014 (aged 99); Dallas, Texas
- Education: Hampden–Sydney College; Dallas Theological Seminary
- Occupations: Theologian; pastor; author
- Spouse: Dorothy Harrison Pentecost (m. 1938; died 2000)
- Children: Jane Pentecost Fenby; Gwendolyn Ann Pentecost Arnold
- Writing career
- Pen name: Dwight Pentecost; J. Dwight Pentecost
- Years active: 1941 – 2014
- Subjects: Christian living; eschatology
- Notable work: Things to Come

John Dwight Pentecost (April 24, 1915 – April 28, 2014) was an American Christian theologian, best known for his book Things to Come.

Pentecost was born in Pennsylvania and died in Dallas, Texas. His wife was Dorothy Harrison Pentecost (June 17, 1915 – June 21, 2000). John and Dorothy had two daughters: Jane Pentecost Fenby and Gwendolyn Ann Pentecost Arnold.

== Career ==
Pentecost held a B.A. from Hampden–Sydney College (1937) and Th.M. (1941) and Th.D. (1956) degrees from Dallas Theological Seminary. During his academic career he taught biblical subjects for over 60 years (Philadelphia College of Bible, 1948–1955; Dallas Theological Seminary, 1955–2014). He was Distinguished Professor Emeritus of Bible Exposition at DTS, one of only two so honored.

Pentecost was ordained in 1941 at Cambridge Springs, Pennsylvania, into the Presbyterian Church, serving as a pastor there from 1941 to 1946, and then at Saint John's Presbyterian Church in Devon, Pennsylvania, from 1946 to 1951. He was the senior pastor at Grace Bible Church in Dallas, Texas, from 1958 to 1976. Fellow DTS seminarian Charles R. Swindoll served under Pentecost at Grace Church from 1961 to 1965, including a two-year position as assistant pastor.

Pentecost wrote nearly twenty books, mostly for the general Christian audience. He spoke to audiences worldwide. A Festschrift, Essays in Honor of J. Dwight Pentecost, was published by Moody Press in 1986.

== Writings ==
Pentecost is possibly best known for his published writings, which are predominantly focused on issues of Christian living and eschatology. Pentecost was a dispensationalist, taking a premillennial and pretribulational view of the prophetic and apocalyptic biblical passages. His Things to Come (1958) includes a comprehensive review of almost every view on the biblical prophetic subject matter that has any level of prominence.

== Bibliography ==
- Things to Come, Zondervan, 1958, ISBN 0-310-30890-9
- Prophecy for Today : God's Purpose and Plan for Our Future, Zondervan, 1961, ISBN 0-929239-11-3
- Will Man Survive?
- The Parables of the Kingdom
- Pattern for Maturity (since retitled Designed to Be Like Him)
- The Joy of Intimacy with God : A Bible Study Guide to 1 John, Discovery House
- Faith That Endures : A Practical Commentary on the Book of Hebrews, 2000 rev. ed.
- The Divine Comforter : The Person and Work of the Holy Spirit, Kregel, 1963, ISBN 0-8254-3456-4
- Designed to be Like Him : Understanding God's Plan for Fellowship, Conduct, Conflict, and Maturity, 1966
- Your Adversary, the Devil, 1969
- Life’s Problems-God’s Solutions : Answers to 15 of Life's most Perplexing Problems, 1971
- The Joy of Living : Study of Philippians, Kregel, 1973, ISBN 0-310-30871-2
- Design for Living : Lessons on Holiness from the Sermon on the Mount, Kregel, 1975, ISBN 0-8254-3457-2
- The Sermon on the Mount : Contemporary Insights for a Christian Lifestyle, Multnomah Press, Portland, 1980
- The Words and Works of Jesus Christ : A Study of the Life of Christ, Zondervan, 1981, ISBN 0-310-30940-9
- A Harmony of the Words & Works of Jesus Christ, Zondervan, 1981, ISBN 0-310-30951-4
- The Parables of Jesus : Lessons in Life from the Master Teacher, 1982
- Thy Kingdom Come : Tracing God's Kingdom Program and Covenant Promises Throughout History, Kregel, 1995, ISBN 0-8254-3450-5
- Things Which become Sound Doctrine : Doctrinal Studies of Fourteen Crucial Words of Faith, Kregel, 1996, ISBN 0-8254-3452-1
- Design for Discipleship : Discovering God's Blueprint for the Christian Life, Kregel, 1996, ISBN 0-8254-3451-3
- New Wine: A Study of Transition in the Book of Acts, Kregel, 2010, ISBN 0-8254-3597-8
