= Charles Caldwell Ryrie =

American theologian (1925–2016)

- Born: March 2, 1925; St. Louis
- Died: February 16, 2016 (aged 90)
- Education: Dallas Theological Seminary (ThM, DTh); University of Edinburgh (PhD)
- Occupation: Theologian
- Theological work
- Tradition or movement: Free Grace theology
- Notable ideas: Revised Dispensationalism

Charles Caldwell Ryrie (March 2, 1925 – February 16, 2016) was an American Bible scholar and Christian theologian. He served as professor of systematic theology and dean of doctoral studies at Dallas Theological Seminary and as president and professor at what is now Cairn University. After his retirement from Dallas Theological Seminary he also taught courses for Tyndale Theological Seminary. He is considered one of the most influential American theologians of the 20th century. He was the editor of The Ryrie Study Bible by Moody Publishers, containing more than 10,000 of Ryrie's explanatory notes. First published in 1978, it has sold more than 2 million copies. He was a notable proponent of classic dispensationalism.

== Early life, education, and family ==
Ryrie was born to John Alexander and Elizabeth Caldwell Ryrie in St. Louis, Missouri, and grew up in Alton, Illinois. His paternal grandfather, John Alexander Ryrie Sr. (1827–1904), served as a correspondent in the late 1870s of the earliest known Plymouth Brethren meeting in the United States, which was started in Alton by Scottish settlers in 1849. After graduating from high school in 1942, Charles attended The Stony Brook School on Long Island for one semester, where he became acquainted with headmaster Frank E. Gaebelein.

Ryrie attended Haverford College, intending on following his father into a banking career. However, during his junior year, while meeting with Dallas Theological Seminary founder Lewis Sperry Chafer, Ryrie dedicated his life to Christian ministry, and left Haverford to study theology at Dallas Theological Seminary. Haverford conferred his BA (1946) on the basis of his studies at Dallas. A year later, he earned his Th.M. (1947), and two years following that his Th.D. (1949). He went on to complete his Doctor of Philosophy (1954) at the University of Edinburgh. He also earned a Litt.D. from Liberty Baptist Theological Seminary, now Liberty University School of Divinity.

In 1987, Ryrie's wife divorced him. Believing that the Bible did not allow divorced persons to remarry, he determined to live the rest of his life as a single man, despite his wife's subsequent remarriage.

Dr. Ryrie was the father of three children and grandfather of three grandchildren.

== Academic career ==
Ryrie began his academic career by teaching one summer for Midwest Bible and Missionary Institute (which would eventually become a part of Calvary Bible College). Ryrie joined the faculty of Westmont College in 1948 and eventually became dean of men and chairman of the Department of Biblical Studies and Philosophy. He returned to Dallas Theological Seminary in 1953 to teach systematic theology, but left for several years to serve as president of Philadelphia College of the Bible (now Cairn University), from 1958 to 1962. He was also an adjunct faculty member from Fall 1991 through Fall 2001. Upon returning to Dallas once again, he became dean of doctoral studies until his retirement in 1983. Ryrie has written 32 books which have sold more than 1.5 million copies. Additionally, his study bible has sold more than 2.6 million copies.

Ryrie was an avid collector of quality rare Bibles and Bible manuscripts. On December 5, 2016, his collection was sold by Sothebys for US$7.3 Million. A 15th century copy of a Wycliffe's Bible New Testament sold for $1,620,500 at auction.

== Theology ==
Charles Ryrie taught Free Grace theology, the belief that only fiduciary faith in Jesus Christ is needed for salvation. Ryrie wrote a book "So Great Salvation: What It Means to Believe in Jesus Christ", in which he criticized the Lordship salvation view of salvation. Ryrie defended the view that the word "metanoia" (repentance) refers to a change of mind, being a synonym for faith instead of a turning from sin. Charles Ryrie agreed with some of the points in Calvinism, holding to total depravity and unconditional election, though he taught that the atonement was universal. Ryrie was a dispensationalist, holding to a pretribulation rapture.

Ryrie agreed with the doctrine of divine simplicity, saying it underscores God's self-existence. Ryrie rejected Monothelitism, Apollinarianism and held to Trinitarian theology.

Charles Caldwell Ryrie taught that when attending church, men should remove their caps and that women should wear a headcovering (veil), as he said that Saint Paul's command in 1 Corinthians 11 was "based on theology (headship v.3), the order of creation (v.7-9), and the presence of angels in the meeting (v.10)."

== Death ==
Ryrie died on February 16, 2016, in Dallas, Texas.

== Publications ==
Two of his books (The Miracles of Our Lord and So Great Salvation) garnered the Gold Medallion Book Award. Other publications include:

- Dispensationalism Today, 1965; The Moody Bible Institute of Chicago.
- A Survey of Bible Doctrine Moody Press, 1972 (First Edition), 1989 (11th Edition) ISBN 0-8024-8438-7 NOTE: This title is also available in electronic version for use with, and sold by: Logos Bible Software.
- The Grace of God Moody Press, 1963 (First Edition), 1970 (Second Edition), 1975 (Third Edition) ISBN 0-8024-32506, ISBN 978-0-80-243250-6
- Ryrie's Concise Guide to the Bible, Here's Life Publishers, 1983 ISBN 0-685-09716-1 [Paperback] NOTE: This title is also available in electronic version for use with, and sold by: Logos Bible Software.
- Basic Theology, Moody Press, 1986, ISBN 0-89693-814-X
- Balancing the Christian Life, Moody Press, 1994 ISBN 0-8024-0887-7
- Biblical Answers to Tough Questions, Tyndale Seminary Press, 2008.
- Biblical Theology of the New Testament, Moody Press, 1959.
- Come Quickly Lord Jesus: What You Need to Know About the Rapture, Harvest House Publishers, 1996.
- Dispensationalism, Moody Press, 1995 ISBN 0-8024-2187-3
- Neo-Orthodoxy: What It Is and What It Does, Moody Press, 1956.
- Revelation, Chicago: Moody Press, 1968.
- Ryrie's Practical Guide to Communicating Bible Doctrine, Broadman & Holman Publishers, 2005 ISBN 0-8054-4063-1
- So Great Salvation: What It Means to Believe in Jesus Christ, Moody Press, 1997 ISBN 0-8024-7818-2
- The Acts of the Apostles, Moody Press, 1961.
- The Basis of the Premillennial Faith, ECS Ministries, 2005.
- The Best Is Yet to Come, Moody Press, 1981.
- The Holy Spirit Moody Press 1965 ISBN 0-8024-3565-3
- The Miracles of Our Lord, ECS Ministries, 2005.
- The Role of Women in the Church, B & H Publishing Group, 2011.
- The Ryrie Study Bible Moody Press 1986, 1994 ISBN 978-0-8024-8902-9
- What You Should Know About Inerrancy, Moody Press, 1981.
