= Buist M. Fanning =

American scholar

- Born: Buist Martin Fanning III; May 26, 1949 (age 77)
- Occupation: Biblical scholar
- Title: Professor of New Testament studies at Dallas Theological Seminary

Academic background
- Education: Oxford University (DPhil)
- Thesis: (1987)

Academic work
- Discipline: Biblical studies

Buist Martin Fanning III (born May 26, 1949) is an American scholar of biblical Greek and a professor of New Testament studies at Dallas Theological Seminary. He was one of the translators who worked on the 1995 update of the New American Standard Bible. Fanning earned his BA (1970) from the College of Charleston, his ThM (1974) from Dallas Theological Seminary and his DPhil (1987) from Oxford University.

== Works ==
=== Thesis ===
- Fanning, Buist M. (1974). An Evaluation of the Linguistic Method of Selected Articles in Kittel's Theological Dictionary (M.Th.). Dallas, TX: Dallas Theological Seminary. OCLC 860185222.
- ——— (1986). A Study of Verbal Aspect in New Testament Greek (Ph.D.). Oxford: University of Oxford. OCLC 15672649.

=== Books ===
- ——— (1994). Verbal Aspect in New Testament Greek. Oxford Theological Monographs. Oxford: Clarendon Press. ISBN 0198267290.
- ———; Bock, Darrell L. (2006). Interpreting the New Testament Text: Introduction to the Art and Science of Exegesis. Wheaton, IL: Crossway Books. ISBN 1433519224.
- ——— (2020). Revelation. Zondervan Exegetical Commentary on the New Testament. Grand Rapids, MI: Zondervan. ISBN 978-0310244172.

=== As editor ===
- ———; Bock, Darrell L., eds. (2006). Interpreting the New Testament Text: Introduction to the Art and Science of Exegesis. Wheaton, IL: Crossway. ISBN 9781581344080.
