= Chuck Swindoll =

American pastor and writer

- Born: Charles Rozell Swindoll; October 18, 1934 (age 91); El Campo, Texas, U.S.
- Years active: 1963–present
- Spouse: Cynthia Parker (m. 1955)
- Children: 4

Academic background
- Education: Dallas Theological Seminary (M.Div.)

Academic work
- School or tradition: Inspirational, Christian living
- Notable works: The Grace Awakening, Swindoll's New Testament Insights

Charles Rozell Swindoll /ˈswɪnˌdɒl/ (born October 18, 1934) is an evangelical Christian pastor, author, educator, and radio preacher. He founded Insight for Living, headquartered in Frisco, Texas, which airs a radio program of the same name on more than 2,000 stations around the world in 15 languages. He was the founding pastor at Stonebriar Community Church, in Frisco, Texas, and also sat on its elder board.

== Early life ==
Charles Rozell Swindoll was born on October 18, 1934, in El Campo in Wharton County, Texas, the third of three children born to Earl and Lovell Swindoll. He attended Charles H. Milby High School in Houston. He credits his drama teacher, Dick Nieme, for helping him manage his stutter. As a member of the school marching band and orchestra, he learned to play all of the instruments in the woodwind section, although the clarinet remained his primary instrument. After graduating from high school, he studied mechanical engineering while working for Reed Roller Bit Company in Houston, Texas. Swindoll then fulfilled his military service obligation with the United States Marine Corps, first in San Francisco, then on the Japanese island of Okinawa. Part of his duty included playing in the Marine Corps Marching Band.

After his honorable discharge in 1959, he attended Dallas Theological Seminary, where he graduated magna cum laude four years later.

== Career ==
Swindoll was ordained into the ministry in 1963 and served in Dallas at Grace Bible Church under J. Dwight Pentecost for two years. He has since held senior pastorates in Waltham, Massachusetts (1965–67), Irving, Texas (1967–71), and Fullerton, California (1971–94). He began his last senior pastorate in Frisco, Texas, in 1998.

Swindoll is the founder of Insight for Living, which broadcasts a radio program of the same name on Christian and non-Christian radio stations around the world. The program is heard on more than 2,000 stations, as well as being webcast, and is translated into several languages. Its roots go back to the summer of 1977, when Swindoll's sermons from the First Evangelical Free Church in Fullerton were broadcast on radio. In 1979, the Insight for Living radio ministry began; its offices are now located in Frisco.

In July 1994, Swindoll became the president of Dallas Theological Seminary, and served in that capacity until 2001. After his presidency, he served as its chancellor. He is the author of more than 70 books, most of which are based on his research and preparation for sermons preached each Sunday. In celebration of the magazine's 50th anniversary, Christianity Today produced an article naming Swindoll as one of the top 25 most influential preachers of the past 50 years (1956–2006).

In 1998, Swindoll founded Stonebriar Community Church in Frisco. Many of the pastors at Stonebriar are graduates of Dallas Theological Seminary. The church first held services at Collin County Community College (now Collin College), then moved to its permanent home on Legendary Drive. The congregation grew rapidly from a few hundred members to several thousand in the first few years, and the growth necessitated major expansion of Stonebriar's facility. Construction for the expansion began in 2005 and ended in 2009. The church is known for its missionary work in India and in other countries and for the multitude of programs supporting and ministering to the community. Though Swindoll is still widely regarded as an Evangelical Free Church of America preacher, Stonebriar Community Church is not affiliated with any particular denomination.

In April 2024, Swindoll announced that he would step down as senior pastor, effective May 1, but would continue preaching at Stonebriar. Later that year, in September, 2024, Swindoll announced he would be retiring from the pastorate at Stonebriar Community Church, but "will not retire from ministry". Swindoll expressed that he would continue ministry work at Insight for Living and will "have the joy of remaining there for as long as God gives [Cynthia and me] the strength to do so." Swindoll's recent activities have included continually helping lead Insight for Living, hosting "Living with Insight" (a podcast where Swindoll "sits down with friends and well-known leaders to discuss life and ministry"), and speaking at pastor training events and conferences.

== Personal life ==
On June 18, 1955, Swindoll married Cynthia Ann Parker, a pianist at a Baptist church in Galena Park, Texas. Chuck and Cynthia have four adult kids, 14 grandchildren, and 10 great-grandkids.

== Selected publications ==
- Hand Me Another Brick, Thomas Nelson (1978)
- You And Your Child, Thomas Nelson (1977)
- Three Steps Forward, Two Steps Back: Persevering Through Pressure, Thomas Nelson (1980)
- Strike The Original Match, Multnomah (1980)
- Improving Your Serve: The Art Of Unselfish Living, Word (1981)
- Strengthening Your Grip: Essentials In An Aimless World, Word (1982)
- Growing Strong in the Seasons of Life, Multnomah (1983)
- Dropping Your Guard: The Value Of Open Relationships, Word (1983)
- Come Before Winter – And Share My Hope, Multnomah (1985)
- Living on the Ragged Edge: Coming To Terms With Reality, Word (1985)
- Growing Deep In The Christian Life: Returning To Our Roots, Multnomah (1986)
- The Quest For Character, Multnomah (1987)
- Living Above The Level of Mediocrity: A Commitment To Excellence, Word (1987)
- Growing Wise in Family Life, Multnomah (1988)
- Living Beyond The Daily Grind: Reflections On The Songs And Sayings In Scripture, Word (1988)
- Rise & Shine: A Wake-Up Call, Multnomah (1989)
- The Grace Awakening, Word (1990)
- Sanctity Of Life: The Inescapable Issue, Word (1990)
- Stress Fractures, Multnomah (1990)
- Simple Faith, Word (1991)
- “Life is 10% what happens to you and 90% how you react to it.”
- Laugh Again, Word (1992)
- Flying Closer to the Flame, Word (1993)
- The Finishing Touch, Word (1994)
- Paw Paw Chuck's Big Ideas in the Bible, Word (1995)
- Hope Again, Word (1996)
- The Road To Armageddon (with John F. Walvoord; J. Dwight Pentecost), Word (1999)
- Start Where You Are: Catch A Fresh Vision For Your Life, Word (1999)
- The Mystery Of God's Will: What Does He Want For Me?, Word (1999)
- Intimacy With The Almighty, Word (1996)
- Perfect Trust: Ears To Hear, Hearts To Trust, And Minds To Rest In Him, J. Countryman (2000)
- The Darkness And The Dawn: Empowered By The Tragedy And Triumph Of The Cross, Word (2001)
- Why, God?: Calming Words For Chaotic Times, Word (2001)
- Wisdom For The Way: Wise Words For Busy People, J. Countryman (2001)
- Understanding Christian Theology (with Roy B. Zuck), Thomas Nelson (2003)
- Behold—The Man!: The Pathway Of His Passion, Word (2004)
- So, You Want To Be Like Christ?: Eight Essentials To Get You There, Word (2005)
- When God Is Silent (Choosing To Trust In Life's Trials), J. Countryman (2005)
- Great Attitudes For Graduates!: 10 Choices For Success In Life (with Terri A. Gibbs), J. Countryman (2006)
- Encouragement For Life: Words Of Hope And Inspiration, J. Countryman (2006) ISBN 978-1-4041-0323-8
- The Strength Of Character: 7 Essential Traits Of A Remarkable Life (with Terri A. Gibbs), J. Countryman (2007) ISBN 978-1-4041-0394-8
- A Bethlehem Christmas: Celebrating The Joyful Season, Thomas Nelson (2007) ISBN 978-1-4041-0468-6
- The Owner's Manual for Christians: The Essential Guide for a God-Honoring Life, Thomas Nelson (2009) ISBN 0-8499-0191-X
- The Church Awakening: An Urgent Call for Renewal, FaithWords (2010) ISBN 978-0-446-55653-8
- Living the Psalms, Worthy Publishing (2012) ISBN 9781936034703
- Living the Proverbs, Worthy Publishing (2012) ISBN 9781936034710
- Hear Me When I Call: Learning to Connect with a God Who Cares, Worthy Publishing (2013) ISBN 978-1-936034-93-2
- Embraced By The Spirit: The Untold Blessings of Intimacy With God, Worthy Publishing (2013) ISBN 978-1-617-95229-6
- The Swindoll Study Bible, Tyndale House (2017) ISBN 978-1414387253
- Awakened by Grace (Expected publication, 2026)

=== Swindoll's New Testament Insights Commentary Series ===
- Insights on Romans, Zondervan (2010) ISBN 978-0-310-28430-7
- Insights on John, Zondervan (2010) ISBN 978-0-310-28435-2
- Insights on James and 1 & 2 Peter, Zondervan (2010) ISBN 978-0-310-28432-1
- Insights on 1 & 2 Timothy and Titus, Zondervan (2011) ISBN 978-0-310-28433-8
- Insights on Revelation, Zondervan (2012)
- Insights on Luke, Zondervan (2012)
- Insights on Acts, Tyndale House (2016) ISBN 978-1-4143-9375-9

=== Profiles in Character series ===
- David: A Man Of Passion & Destiny, Word (1997) ISBN 978-0-8499-1382-2
- Esther: A Woman Of Strength & Dignity, Word (1997) ISBN 978-0-8499-1383-9
- Joseph: A Man Of Integrity And Forgiveness, Word (1998) ISBN 978-0-8499-1342-6
- Moses: A Man Of Selfless Dedication, Word (1999) ISBN 978-0-8499-1385-3
- Elijah: A Man Of Heroism And Humility, Word (2000) ISBN 978-0-8499-1386-0
- Paul: A Man Of Grace And Grit, Word (2002) ISBN 978-0-8499-1749-3
- Job: A Man Of Heroic Endurance, Word (2004) ISBN 978-0-8499-1389-1
- Fascinating Stories of Forgotten Lives: Rediscovering Some Old Testament Characters, Word (2005) ISBN 0-8499-0016-6
- Jesus: The Greatest Life Of All, Thomas Nelson (2008) ISBN 0-8499-0190-1
- Abraham: One Nomad's Amazing Journey of Faith, Tyndale House (2014) ISBN 978-1-4143-8063-6

== Honors and awards ==
- Harry A. Ironside Award for Expository Preaching – Dallas Theological Seminary, 1963
- Christian Education Award – Dallas Theological Seminary, 1963
- Faculty Award – Dallas Theological Seminary, 1963
- Doctor of Divinity – Talbot School of Theology, 1977
- Doctor of Human Letters – Taylor University, 1986
- Clergyman of the Year – Religious Heritage of America, 1988
- Doctor of Laws – Pepperdine University, 1990
- Doctor of Literature – Dallas Baptist University, 1998
- Lifetime Achievement Award – Catalyst Conference, 2009

== See also ==
- Paws and Tales
