= Joseph Stowell =

American theologian

- Born: February 7, 1944 (age 82)
- Citizenship: United States
- Education: Cedarville University; Dallas Theological Seminary
- Occupations: Author, evangelist
- Employers: Moody Bible Institute; Harvest Bible Chapel; Cornerstone University; Billy Graham Evangelistic Association
- Spouse: Martha "Martie" Bennet
- Writing career
- Language: English
- Subjects: Theology, evangelism

Joseph M. Stowell III (born February 7, 1944) retired as the president of Cornerstone University in May 2021, and is author of over 20 Christian books. He is a graduate of Cedarville University and Dallas Theological Seminary (1970) and was honored with a Doctor of Divinity degree from The Master's College in 1987. His wife is Martie (Martha Bennet of South Elgin, Illinois).

From 1987 to 2005, Stowell served as the president of Moody Bible Institute. Prior to accepting the presidency at Cornerstone, he served as Teaching Pastor at Harvest Bible Chapel, in suburban Chicago. As of 2008, he continued in that role. He also serves on the board of the Billy Graham Evangelistic Association.

Stowell works with RBC (Radio Bible Class) Ministries in Grand Rapids, partnering in media productions. His web ministry, Strength for the Journey, features daily devotionals, weekly messages and commentary, downloadable Bible study curriculum, and an audio library of his most requested messages.

In November 2009, Stowell signed a statement known as the Manhattan Declaration calling on evangelicals, Catholics and Orthodox not to comply with rules and laws permitting abortion, same-sex marriage and other matters that go against their religious consciences.

== Publications ==
- Coming Home: The Soul's Search for Intimacy (1998)
- Eternity: Reclaiming a Passion for What Endures (Chicago: Moody, Sep 1995)
- Fan the Flame: Living Out your First Love for Christ (Aug 1986)
- Far From Home: The Soul's Search for Intimacy with God (Feb 1998)
- The Final Question of Jesus: How You Can Live the Answer Today (LifeChange Books, Aug 2004)
- Following Christ: Experiencing Life the Way it was Meant to Be (Grand Rapids: Zondervan, 1996) audio excerpt
- From the Front Lines: Lessons from the Trenches of Life (Dec 2007)
- I Would Follow Jesus: Writings from the Heart of Joseph Stowell (Feb 2005)
- Joy of the Master: Daily Living as a Faithful Follower of Christ (Sep 2001)
- Kingdom Conflict (1985)
- La Luz del Amanecer (Dec 1994)
- Living the Life God Has Planned: A Guide to Knowing God's Will (Jan 2001) with Bill Thrasher
- Loving Christ (2000)
- Loving Those We'd Rather Hate (Jun 1994)
- Moody Prayer Journal (1999)
- Overcoming Evil with Good: The Impact of a Life Well-Lived (Jan 1995)
- Pasión por Cristo (2003)
- Perilous Pursuits: Our Obsession with Significance (1994)
- Radical Reliance: Living 24/7 with God at the Center (Aug 2006)
- Revelation (Aug 1995)
- Shepherding the Church into the 21st Century (Oct 1994)
- Simply Jesus: Experiencing the One your Heart Longs For (Lifechange Books, Jan 2002)
- Storm Clouds on the Horizon: Bible Prophecy and the Current Middle East Crisis (2001) with Charles H. Dyer
- Strength for the Journey: Day-by-Day with Jesus (2002)
- The Dawn's Early Light (1990)
- The Trouble with Jesus (2003)
- The Weight of Your Words: Measuring the Impact of What you Say (Billy Graham Library, 1998)
- Tongue in Check (Apr 1994)
- Twelve Ways to Build Lasting Relationships: Thinking of You (1991)
- Why It's Hard to Love Jesus (Sep 2003)
- The Upside of Down (Dec 2005)
