= Henri Lanctin =

Henri Lanctin (March 21, 1892 - February 26, 1986) was a French Protestant evangelist in the French-speaking areas of Canada. Lanctin was responsible for increasing Protestant influence in these areas.

== Early life ==
Born into a Catholic family in Fontenay, France, Lanctin became disenchanted with the church at age 15 due to what he perceived as immoral practices by some priests. At age 16, wanting a freer society, he moved to New York City to live with his brother.

Lanctin later moved to Paterson, New Jersey. At that time, Patterson had a large population of French and Belgians who worked in the linen and silk factories. Lanctin worked as a gardener at a nice property.

In the summer of 1909, Lanctin underwent a Christian spiritual awakening and was baptized by immersion in a Protestant ceremony. From 1910 to 1914. Lanctin attended the Institut Feller in Grande-Ligne, Quebec. During his summer vacations, he spent time proselytizing from door to door in Hull, Quebec, where he reportedly encountered. deep opposition. While doing the same activity in [Lac Long, Quebec area, Lanctin was allegedly the object of two murder attempts.

In July 1914, Lanctin returned to France to visit his parents in La-Chapelle-des-Prés. During his visit, France entered the First World War and Lanctin was drafted into the French Army. During the fighting, Lanctin suffered a severe in injury to his right lung in Vimy. Unable to return to the front, he continued his military service in the French auxiliary forces in the commune of La Possonnière. In 1917, Lanctin met Eugénie Meslet in Possonière. They were married on April 10, 1920.

== Work as pastor ==
After the war, Lanctin and his wife returned to Canada. He became a Protestant pastor in Lac Long, then in Connors, New Brunswick. In 1931, he contracted tuberculosis. Hospitalized in Saint John, New Brunswick, Lanctin had a poor prognosis. However, in what he considered to be a miracle, he recovered. In 1934, Lanctin founded the Mission and Bookshop La Bonne Nouvelle in Moncton, New Brunswick.

In 1935, Lanctin founded the first French Baptist Church in New Brunswick, in Moncton. On November 17, 1935, he hosted the first French Protestant evangelical radio broadcast in North America on CKCW in Moncton. His program, "La Bonne Nouvelle", allegedly prompted the Catholic clergy in New Brunswick to start a campaign to remove Lanctin from the airways.

Lanctin's opponents accused Lanctin of insulting the Catholic church during his broadcasts. In response, the Canadian Radio Broadcasting Commission banished him from hosting the program for nine months. The controversy soon caught the attention of the Canadian Parliament and the Prime Minister of Canada. After an inquiry, the Radio Commission reinstated Lanctin in December 1936. The program was eventually broadcast by numerous radio stations in the Maritime provinces, Quebec, New England, Louisiana and Haiti.

On June 29, 1938, in Alexandrina, New Brunswick, Lanctin became the object of a violent protest by people objecting to his preaching. Hundreds of demonstrators gathered in front of his meeting tent. After the police escorted Lanctin and the meeting attendees to a safe place, the mob set fire to the tent and then tried to burn down the house of the property owner. After a brief scuffle, the police arrested a number of protesters. A dozen defendants were later convicted of instigating a riot and hindering the work of law enforcement.

== Marriages and children ==
In December 1936, Eugénie Lanctin died at age 40 years old of cancer. The couple had six sons: Maurice, Eugene, Henri, Yvon, George and Raymond. On June 8, 1940 Henri married Marjorie Mae MacKenzie.

On March 3, 1943 during World War II, Lanctin's son Maurice, serving as a gunner in a bomber, was killed when his plane crashed above Hamburg,

== Death ==
Lanctin died peacefully in Campbellton, New-Brunswick at age 93 on February 26, 1986. The Bookshop La Bonne Nouvelle closed in 2009.

His mission work, as well as the radio program and the biblical camp l'Allée Verte, founded by Lanctin in 1938, led to the formation of several French Baptist Churches in New Brunswick. his sons, Henri and Eugene both went into evangelical and pastoral work.
