= Paul Nyquist =

American academic

- Born: Oakland, Nebraska
- Occupation: President of Moody Bible Institute
- Spouse: Cheryl Nyquist
- Website: http://www.moodyministries.net

J. Paul Nyquist is the former president of the Moody Bible Institute (MBI) in Chicago, Illinois, United States. He was announced as the ninth president of MBI on April 15, 2009, and assumed the presidency on June 1, 2009, over the Undergraduate School, Graduate School, Moody Radio and Moody Publishers. He resigned from his position on January 10, 2018. Nyquist moved to MBI from Avant Ministries, where he served as President. Before joining Avant Ministries, Nyquist was senior pastor at First Federated Church in Des Moines, Iowa, and Evangelical Bible Church in Omaha, Nebraska.

Nyquist received his Bachelor of Arts degree in architectural studies from the University of Nebraska–Lincoln in 1976. He then attended Dallas Theological Seminary where he received a Master of Theology in 1981 and a Ph.D. in systematic theology in 1984. He and his wife, Cheryl, have been married since 1981 and have four children: Natalie (a 2005 Moody graduate), Taylor, Carson (a 2010 Moody graduate), and Sawyer (a 2011 Moody graduate).
