= Cairn University =

Christian university in Pennsylvania, US

Coordinates: 40.1665°N 74.9089°W

- Former name: List: Bible Institute of Philadelphia (1913–1921); Bible Institute of Pennsylvania (1921–1951); Philadelphia School of the Bible (1914–1951); Philadelphia Bible Institute (1951–1958); Philadelphia College of Bible (1958–2000); Philadelphia Biblical University (2000–2012)
- Motto: Walk a different path
- Type: Private university
- Established: July 8, 1913; 113 years ago
- Accreditation: ABHE, MSCHE
- Religious affiliation: Nondenominational Christian
- President: Todd J. Williams
- Provost: Adam J. Porcella
- Faculty: 124
- Students: 1558
- Undergraduates: 707
- Postgraduates: 351
- Location: Langhorne Manor and Middletown Township, Pennsylvania, United States
- Campus: 96 acres (39 ha); Suburban
- Colors: Crimson (Pantone 209), Black, & White
- Nickname: Highlanders
- Sporting affiliations: NCAA Division III - United East Conference
- Website: cairn.edu/
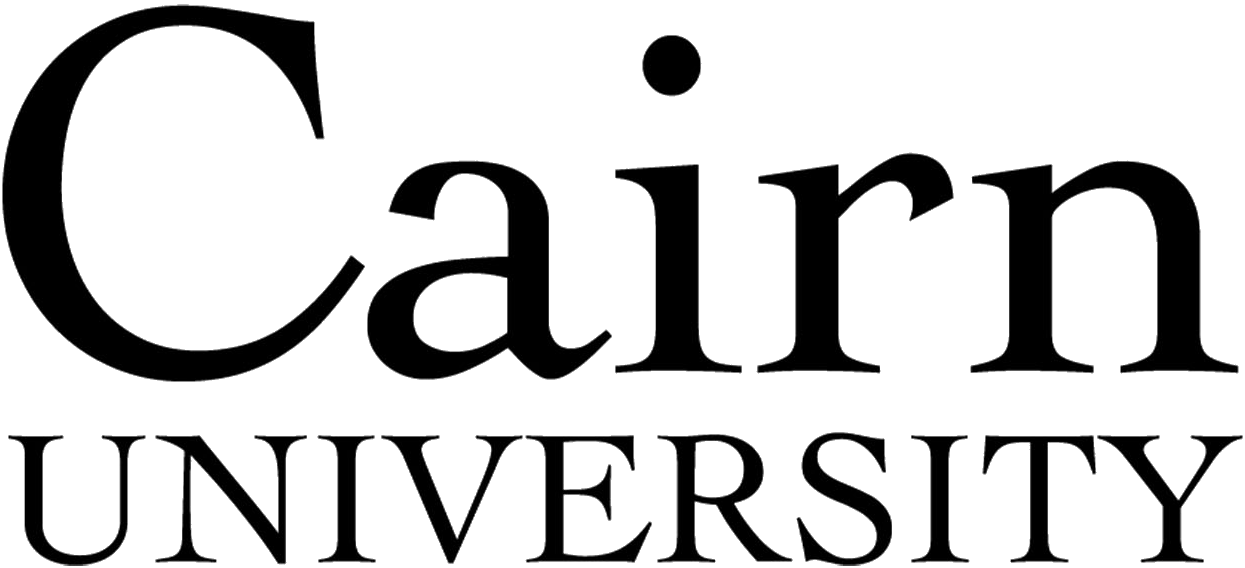

Cairn University is a private Christian university in Langhorne Manor and Middletown Township, Pennsylvania, United States. Founded in 1913, the university has six schools and departments: Business, Counseling, Divinity, Education, Liberal Arts & Sciences, and Music. All students take a minimum of 30 semester hours of Bible classes.

== History ==
=== Origins (1913–1951) ===
On July 8, 1913, W. W. Rugh founded the "Bible Institute of Philadelphia" as an extension of the National Bible Institute of New York. After teaching public school in his earlier days, Rugh spent several years walking a circuit to teach Bible classes throughout eastern Pennsylvania and New Jersey. This led him to establish an institution where the Scriptures could be taught on a daily basis.

Around the same time, C. I. Scofield and William L. Pettingill, leading Bible teachers of their day, were holding a large conference in the Philadelphia area. Encouraged by numerous requests to establish a permanent school to continue teaching, the two men co-founded "Philadelphia School of the Bible" on October 1, 1914. Scofield, known internationally for his Bible teaching and his work on the Scofield Reference Bible, became the first president of PSOB and Pettingill was the first dean.

On October 8, 1921, Rugh's school became independent of the New York school and changed its name to "Bible Institute of Pennsylvania" (BIOPA).

Both BIOPA and PSOB focused on training lay people in the Scriptures for service in the church and their communities. No degrees were conferred.

=== Merger and accreditation (1951–1979) ===
In 1951, the two schools merged to become "Philadelphia Bible Institute" (PBI), located at the YWCA Building at 1800 Arch St. At the time of the merger, William A. Mierop from BIOPA was appointed president and Clarence E. Mason, Jr. from PSOB, academic dean. PBI offered a three-year Bible diploma. By 1958, the Commonwealth of Pennsylvania granted the institute approval to offer a four-year program leading to the Bachelor of Science in Bible degree, and then changed its name to "Philadelphia College of Bible". In 1967, the school received regional accreditation from the Middle States Association, becoming one of the first Bible colleges accredited by MSA.

During the 1970s, PCB continued to develop its academic offerings and was authorized to grant two additional degrees, the Bachelor of Music and the Bachelor of Social Work.

Students were required to take 55 credit hours of Bible, doctrine, and "Bible college distinctive" courses.

Since the merger, the school has had five presidents: William A. Mierop, from 1951 to 1956; Charles C. Ryrie, from 1958 to 1962; Douglas B. MacCorkle, from 1963 to 1977; and W. Sherrill Babb, from 1979 to 2007; Todd J. Williams became the university's fifth president January 1, 2008.

=== Relocation and expansion (1979–2012) ===
W. Sherrill Babb's appointment as president coincided with a relocation from Center City, Philadelphia to a new campus in Langhorne Manor. Under his leadership, in 2000, the Commonwealth of Pennsylvania granted the college approval to become a university and the institution changed its name to "Philadelphia Biblical University". During Babb's presidency, the number of degrees offered increased from three to eleven; six graduate programs were implemented; four extension campuses established; and student enrollment, faculty, and facility space more than doubled.

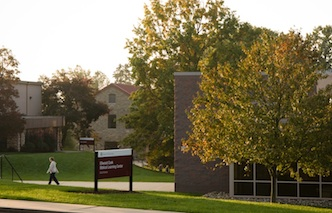
Cairn University's Music Building (left) and Biblical Learning Center (right).

In 2007, a new core curriculum was introduced. It included changes to the educational approach of the institution. In the new core curriculum, students earned 36 credits of specified Bible and theology requirements in combination with a comprehensive arts and sciences and professional curriculum.

On January 1, 2008, former President W. Sherrill Babb became the university's first chancellor and former provost Todd J. Williams was elevated as the university's fifth president. Under the leadership of Williams, the university has continued to expand its academic offerings. A Master of Business Administration degree was approved by the Commonwealth of Pennsylvania in 2010 and professional minors in Education, Music, Social Work, and Business were added in 2011. There has also been significant growth in co-curricular programs like the Arts Initiative, which is focused on strengthening the university's involvement with the fine arts, and the Center for University Studies.

In October 2011, as part of an effort to reduce the time and costs required for undergraduates to finish their studies, the board of trustees voted to allow students the option to pursue a B.S. in Bible degree, a professional degree (B.S. in Business Administration, B.S. in Education, Bachelor of Social Work, Bachelor of Music), or both Bible and professional degrees concurrently. Prior to this decision, all undergraduate students were required to earn a B.S. in Bible. Students who wanted to earn a second professional degree in an area other than Bible or ministry had to earn over 150 credit hours, which often took four and a half or five years to complete. The October 2011 board decision also reduced the minimum of 36 credits in Bible and Theology in the core curriculum to 30 credits.

=== Name change and continued growth (2012–present) ===
On Wednesday April 18, 2012, Williams announced to the student body during chapel that he and the board of trustees were considering changing the name of the school to Cairn University. The name, it was explained, adopts the concept of memorials and trail markers, "Bearing witness [to God's faithfulness] and pointing the way" (see Cairn). The announcement and the proposed new name garnered mixed responses from alumni, students, faculty, and the public. By June 8, 2012, the university had filed official document(s) with the Department of Education of the State of Pennsylvania to change its name to Cairn University. The request was approved one month later, and on July 16, 2012, the school went public as Cairn University.

The university closed its social work program to new students in 2021, with existing students within the program allowed to complete their existing program.

== Athletics ==
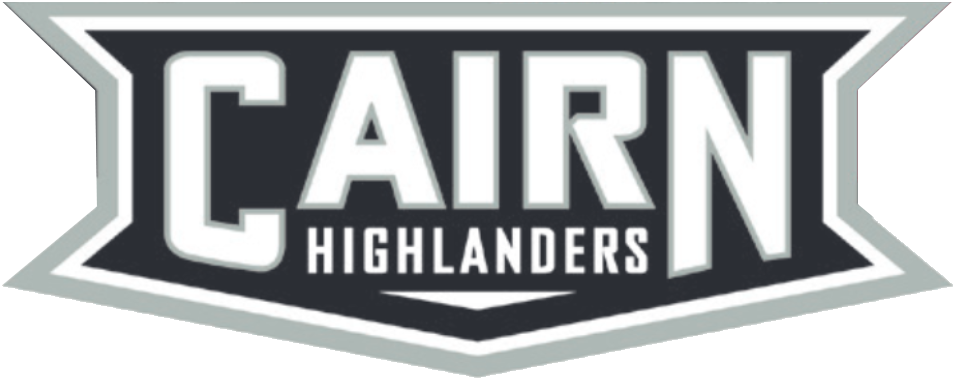
Cairn athletics wordmark

Cairn University student-athletes compete in twelve sports as the "Highlanders". Formerly the "Crimson Eagles," students, faculty, and staff voted to change the mascot in conjunction with the 2012 university name change.

The athletic program is affiliated with the United East Conference (as of July 1, 2023), the National Collegiate Athletic Association (NCAA) and the National Christian College Athletic Association (NCCAA). Men's sports include baseball, basketball, cross country, tennis, soccer, lacrosse and volleyball; while women's sports include basketball, cross country, soccer, softball, tennis, lacrosse, and volleyball.

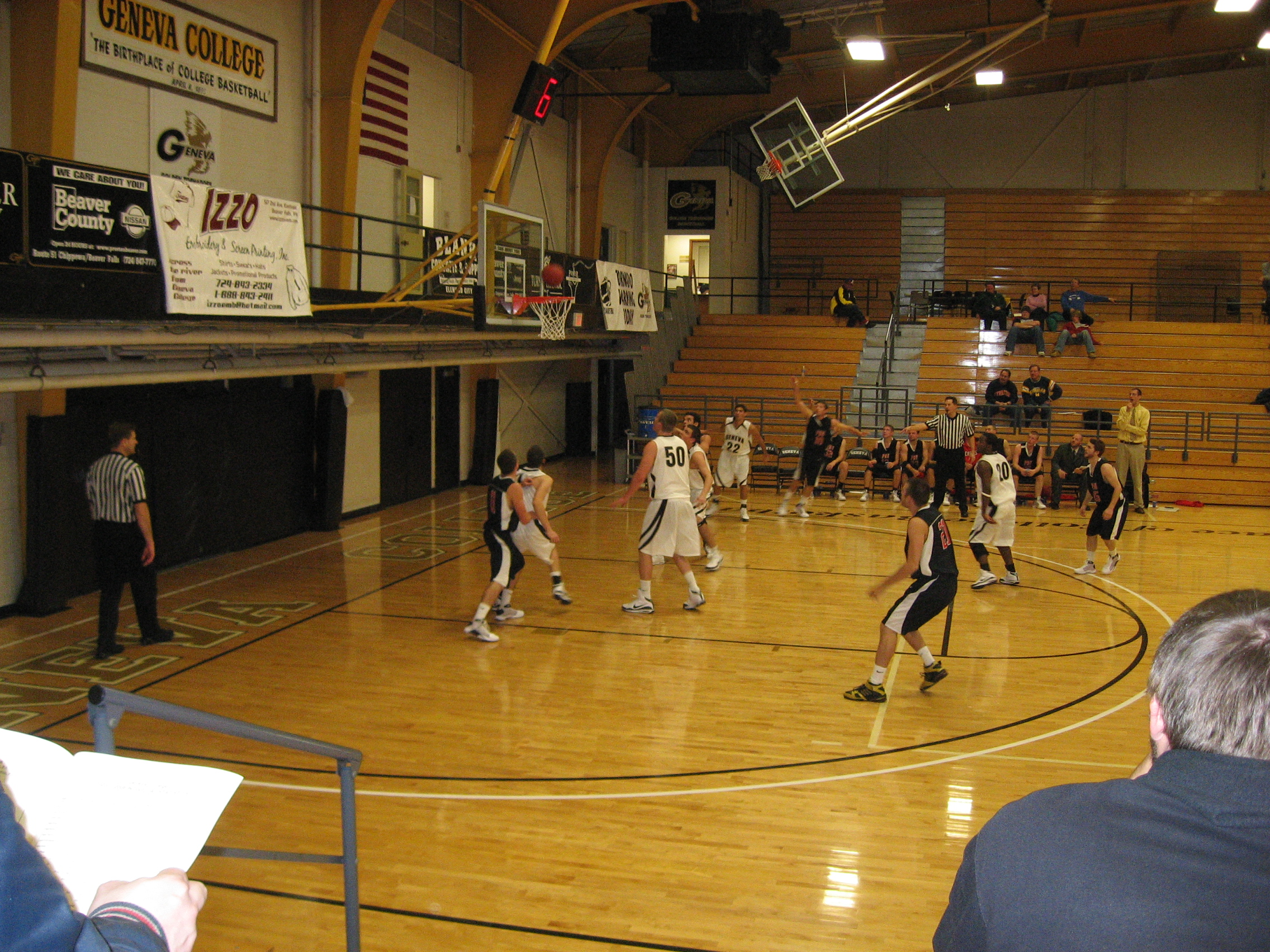
Cairn's basketball team (black jerseys) playing at Geneva College in 2008

In 2014 the men's Cross Country team won the Colonial States Athletic Conference (CSAC) Championship. This was the school's first NCAA conference championship in its 100-year history. In 2015 and 2016, the men's Cross Country team won the championship again. In 2019, the women's Soccer team won their first conference championship, followed by the men's Basketball team during the 2019-20 season. Cairn's men's Volleyball team won back-to-back CSAC Championships in 2021 and 2022 and women's Tennis has won four CSAC Championships in a row from 2019-203 (No Championship hosted in 2020).

Cairn University began competing in the United East Conference following their merger with the Colonial States Athletic Conference on July 1, 2023.

The men's soccer program has won seven NCCAA Division II National Championships (1984, 1985, 1986, 1987, 1988, 1989, 1996).

Students also participate in intramural sports such as flag football, outdoor soccer, basketball, and volleyball.

== Notable alumni ==
- Allen C. Guelzo – Henry R. Luce III Professor of the Civil War Era at Gettysburg College
- Emmanuel Lambert, Jr. - Christian hip-hop artist
- Trip Lee - Christian hip-hop artist
- Duane Litfin – Past president of Wheaton College
- Manuel Ortiz - Professor at Westminster Theological Seminary
- George A. Palmer - radio broadcaster and Christian conference center founder
- Marvin Rosenthal - evangelist and executive director of Friends of Israel
- Rachel Saint – missionary in Ecuador to the Waodani people
- Martin Ssempa – Ugandan pastor, received a graduate degree in 1996 and an honorary doctorate in 2006

== Notable faculty ==
- J. Dwight Pentecost – Taught in the institution from 1948 to 1955; taught at Dallas Theological Seminary; died on April 28, 2014. He wrote a number of volumes including Things to Come and The Words and Works of Christ.
- Charles Caldwell Ryrie – Taught at Philadelphia College of Bible and served as president. He became a dean at Dallas Theological Seminary afterwards. He has authored Dispensationalism Today and Basic Theology.
