= John Walvoord =

American Protestant theologian (1910–2002)

John Flipse Walvoord (May 1, 1910 – December 20, 2002) was a Christian theologian, pastor, and president of Dallas Theological Seminary from 1952 to 1986. He authored over 30 books, focusing primarily on eschatology and theology, including The Rapture Question, and was co-editor of The Bible Knowledge Commentary with Roy B. Zuck. He earned the degrees of Bachelor of Arts and Doctor of Divinity from Wheaton College, a Master of Arts degree from Texas Christian University in philosophy, a Bachelor of Theology, Master of Theology, and Doctor of Theology in systematic theology from Dallas Theological Seminary, and a Litt.D. from Liberty Baptist Seminary.

== Biography ==
Walvoord was brought up in a Christian home but had little interest in the faith until he was fifteen, when his family moved to Racine after his father accepted a position as superintendent of the junior high. They joined the Union Gospel Tabernacle, where Walvoord committed his life to Jesus Christ after attending a Bible study on Galatians.

After continuing his education at Wheaton College, Walvoord went on to Texas Christian University and then Dallas Theological Seminary, where he completed his Th.D. in 1936. Seminary president and mentor Lewis Sperry Chafer appointed Walvoord to the position of registrar. During Walvoord's tenure, he also taught systematic theology at the seminary, and pastored the Rosen Heights Presbyterian Church in Fort Worth. Walvoord became more involved in the administration of the school, serving as Chafer's assistant and secretary to the faculty. Upon Chafer's death in 1952, he became the seminary's second president, serving until his retirement in 1986.

== Writings and beliefs ==
In addition to his responsibilities at the seminary, Walvoord earned a reputation as one of the most influential dispensational theologians of the 20th century. He played a prominent role in advocating the doctrine of a rapture of Christians from the earth prior to a time of great tribulation, followed by a literal thousand-year millennial reign of Christ, and a renewed focus of God on the nation of Israel (which he associated with modern-day Jews) as distinct from the Church. As part of his dispensationalist theology, he claimed there was prophetic biblical justification for the restoration of a Jewish state in Palestine.

In the wake of the 1967 Six-Day War he was a key figure in the growing alignment of the evangelical movement with Israel (in contrast to mainline Protestants who were aligned with the Palestinian people).

Walvoord's 1974 book Armageddon, Oil, and the Middle East Crisis attempted to explain the 1973 Arab-Israeli War in prophetic context, and it sold a large number of copies. It was updated and rereleased in 1991 at the time of the Gulf War, and then republished after Walvoord's death at the time of the Iraq War in 2003. It sold millions of copies, influencing the resurgence of Christian Zionism in the US after September 11 attacks. After Walvoord's death, the book was revised for the third time by Mark Hitchcock and published as Armageddon, Oil, and Terror: What the Bible Says about the Future in 2007, with Hitchcock credited as a co-writer.

== Selected publications ==
- The Revelation of Jesus Christ, John Walvoord, Moody Publishers (1966), ISBN 0-8024-7309-1
- Daniel: The Key to Prophetic Revelation, John Walvoord, Moody Publishers (1971), ISBN 0-8024-1753-1
- Armageddon, Oil and the Middle East Crisis, Zondervan. (1974, rev. ed. 1976 and 1990), ISBN 0-310-53921-8
- Jesus Christ Our Lord, John F Walvoord, Moody Publishers (1974), ISBN 0-8024-4326-5
- Major Bible Themes (with Lewis Sperry Chafer) (1974)
- The Blessed Hope and the Tribulation: A Historical and Biblical Study of Posttribulationism (1976)
- The Rapture Question (1979)
- The Millennial Kingdom (1983)
- The Bible Knowledge Commentary (with Roy B. Zuck), Cook Communications (1989), ISBN 0-89693-800-X
- The Holy Spirit: A Comprehensive Study of the Person and Work of the Holy Spirit (1991)
- (contributor) Five Views on Sanctification (1996)
- (contributor) Four Views on Hell, Zondervan Corp. (1996), ISBN 0-310-53311-2
- Matthew: Thy Kingdom Come, The Moody Bible Institute of Chicago (1974), ISBN 0-8024-5189-6
- The Final Drama: Fourteen Keys to Understanding the Prophetic Scriptures, Kregel Publications (1998), ISBN 0-8254-3971-X
- Every Prophecy of the Bible, Cook Communications (1999), ISBN 1-56476-758-2
- The Church in Prophecy: Exploring God's Purpose for the Present Age, Kregel Publications (1999), ISBN 0-8254-3968-X
- The Power of Praying Together: Experiencing Christ Actively in Charge (with Oliver W. Price), Kregel Publications (1999), ISBN 0-8254-3552-8
- Major Bible Prophecies, Zondervan Corp. (1999), ISBN 0-310-23467-0
- Blessed Hope (autobiography with Mal Couch), AMG Publishers (2001), ISBN 0-89957-361-4
- Prophecy in the New Millennium, Kregel Publications (2001), ISBN 978-0-8254-3967-4

== Audio programs ==
- Harold Camping (Amillennialism) vs. John Walvoord (Premillennialism) – 1980 debate MP3
