= Dallas Theological Seminary =

Theological seminary in Dallas, Texas, United States

- Other name: DTS
- Motto: Teach Truth. Love Well.
- Type: Evangelical seminary
- Established: 1924
- Affiliations: Non-denominational
- Endowment: $82.7 million (2024)
- Chancellor: Mark Bailey
- President: Mark Yarbrough
- Faculty: 89.55
- Students: 1,377 FTE (2025)
- Location: 3909 Swiss Ave, Dallas, Texas, U.S. 32.793611°N 96.779997°W
- Colors: Indigo, Sandstone, Black Patina
- Website: www.dts.edu

Dallas Theological Seminary (DTS) is an evangelical theological seminary in Dallas, Texas. It is known for popularizing the theological system of dispensationalism. DTS has campuses in Dallas, Houston, and Washington, D.C., as well as extension sites in Atlanta, Austin, San Antonio, Nashville, Northwest Arkansas, Europe, and Guatemala, and a multilingual online education program. DTS is the largest non-denominational seminary accredited by the Association of Theological Schools.

DTS was founded in 1924 as the Evangelical Theological College by Rollin T. Chafer, Lewis Sperry Chafer, and William Henry Griffith Thomas. Its founders envisioned a school dedicated to expository Bible teaching, pioneering one of the first four-year Master of Theology (Th.M.) programs. The seminary moved to its current location in 1926 and launched its Doctor of Theology (Th.D.) program in 1927. Under Lewis Sperry Chafer’s leadership until his death in 1952, DTS played a significant role in shaping the fundamentalist movement, training pastors and educators who founded Bible colleges and independent churches. In 1934, the seminary began publishing Bibliotheca Sacra, one of the oldest continuously published theological journals in the United States.

Following Chafer’s death, John F. Walvoord became president in 1952, expanding DTS’s academic programs and influence. Under his leadership, the seminary introduced the Doctor of Ministry (D.Min.) program in 1980 and several master’s programs in biblical studies and Christian education. Subsequent presidents included Donald K. Campbell (1986–1994), Chuck Swindoll (1994–2001), and Mark Bailey (2001–2020), during whose tenure DTS launched programs in biblical counseling, linguistics, media, leadership, a Spanish D.Min. track, and multilingual online education. Mark Yarbrough succeeded Bailey as president in 2020. As of 2014, DTS reported over 15,000 alumni serving in ministry roles across 97 countries worldwide.

Theologically, DTS is widely regarded as a center of modern dispensational teaching, based on Lewis Sperry Chafer’s eight-volume Systematic Theology (1948), which remains a core resource in its curriculum. The seminary upholds beliefs in premillennialism, dispensationalism, and biblical inerrancy while maintaining a non-denominational Protestant identity. DTS was first accredited in 1944 and is a member of several theological and educational associations. Its alumni include prominent pastors, scholars, and authors such as David Jeremiah, Andy Stanley, and Tony Evans.

== History ==
DTS was founded as Evangelical Theological College in 1924 by Rollin T. Chafer and his brother, Lewis Sperry Chafer, who taught the first class of thirteen students, and William Henry Griffith Thomas, who was to have been the school's first theology professor but died before the first classes began. Their vision was a school where expository Bible preaching was taught simply, and under Chafers' leadership, DTS pioneered one of the first four-year degrees in theology, the Master of Theology (Th.M.). The present location of the school was purchased in 1926, and the Doctor of Theology (Th.D.) program was started in 1927. Chafer remained president until his death in 1952.

The seminary had a considerable influence in the fundamentalist movement by training students who established various Bible Colleges and independent fundamentalist churches in the southern United States.

DTS has continually published a quarterly entitled Bibliotheca Sacra initially edited by Rollin T. Chafer since 1934. In 1983, a complete collection of articles was published as a book commemorating fifty years of the journal.

John F. Walvoord took over as president in 1952 after Chafer's death in 1952. In 1974, DTS added a two-year Master of Arts (MA) program in biblical studies, and in 1982, a two-year program in Christian Education was begun. In addition to these, a Doctor of Ministry (D.Min.) program was opened in 1980. Walvoord retired as DTS president in 1986.

From 1986 to 1994, Donald K. Campbell served as president of DTS. During his tenure, DTS opened a three-year MA program in Biblical Counseling and a two-year MA program in Biblical exegesis and linguistics.

Chuck Swindoll served as president of the seminary from 1994 to 2001. Mark Bailey followed, serving as president from 2001 to 2020. Under Bailey's tenure, the seminary added a two-year MA program in media and communication, a two-year MA in Christian leadership, a Spanish D.Min. program, and a multi-lingual online education program. He was succeeded by Mark Yarbrough in 2020.

As of Spring 2014, DTS had over 15,000 alumni serving in various ministerial capacities in 97 countries worldwide.

== Accreditation ==
DTS was first accredited in 1944 by the Board of Regents, State Education Department of the University of the State of New York of Albany. After that institution stopped accrediting institutions outside of New York, DTS was accredited in 1969 by the Southern Association of Colleges and Schools and in 1994 by the Association of Theological Schools in the United States and Canada.

The school is also a member of the Association of Christian Schools International (ACSI), the Evangelical Training Association (ETA), the Jerusalem University College, and the Institute of Theological Studies (ITS).

== Theology ==
1993 reprint of Chafer's Systematic Theology

DTS is known as a center of modern dispensational teaching due to Dr. Chafer's development of a systematic theology which approaches the Bible with a "premillennial, dispensational interpretation of the Scriptures." Systematic Theology, his eight-volume work describing this approach, was first published in 1948 and is still a required textbook for some courses at DTS.

Notable theological beliefs of the school include: premillennialism, dispensationalism, and Biblical inerrancy. The school considers itself non-denominational within Protestantism, and offers classes in all 66 books of the Protestant Bible.

== Notable people ==
In a 2009 study conducted by LifeWay Research, Protestant pastors named preachers who had most influenced them. Three DTS alumni were among the top ten: Chuck Swindoll (1963), founder of radio broadcast Insight for Living; David Jeremiah (1967), founder of Turning Point Radio and Television Ministries; and Andy Stanley (1985), founder of North Point Ministries. Other notable people associated with the seminary include:

=== Alumni ===
- Gregory Beale, former president of the Evangelical Theological Society and professor at Westminster Theological Seminary
- Darrell L. Bock, New Testament scholar
- Steve Breedlove, bishop of the Anglican Church in North America
- Ted Budd, United States Senator from North Carolina
- Charlie Camlin, bishop of the Reformed Episcopal Church
- Michael J. Easley, former president of Moody Bible Institute
- Tony Evans, pastor and widely syndicated radio broadcaster
- Buist M. Fanning, Biblical scholar
- F. David Farnell, professor of New Testament at The Master's Seminary
- Arnold Fruchtenbaum, Messianic Jewish scholar and founder of Ariel Ministries
- John D. Hannah, church history scholar
- Harold Hoehner, New Testament scholar
- Chip Ingram, pastor and orator, founder of Living on the Edge
- Robert Jeffress, pastor of First Baptist Church in Dallas, Texas
- David Jeremiah, author, pastor of Shadow Mountain Community Church
- Howard Clark Kee, American Bible scholar
- Mark Keough, Republican member of the Texas House of Representatives
- Lawrence Khong, senior pastor of Faith Community Baptist Church
- David Klingler, former NFL player and current professor of Bible Exposition
- Peter Lillback, president and professor of historical theology and church history at Westminster Theological Seminary
- Hal Lindsey, author of The Late, Great Planet Earth
- Duane Litfin, former president of Wheaton College
- J. Vernon McGee, founder of Thru the Bible Radio Network program
- Paul Mills, current head men's basketball coach at Oral Roberts University
- Mark Nordstrom, bishop of the Anglican Church in North America
- Paul Nyquist, former president of Moody Bible Institute
- Scott O'Grady, pilot whose story formed the basis for the film Behind Enemy Lines
- J. Dwight Pentecost, Bible expositior
- Samuel L. Perry, professor of Sociology at the University of Oklahoma
- Ernest Pickering, former president of Central Baptist Theological Seminary of Minneapolis
- Jim Rayburn, founder of Young Life
- Justin Roberts, filmmaker and former United States Army chaplain
- Haddon Robinson, former president at Gordon-Conwell Theological Seminary
- Brian Rosner, principal of Ridley College Melbourne
- Charles Caldwell Ryrie, systematic theologian
- Priscilla Shirer, author, motivational speaker, and actress
- Andy Stanley, author, and pastor of North Point Community Church
- Ray Stedman, evangelical Christian pastor, and author.
- Joseph Stowell, former president of Moody Bible Institute, current president of Cornerstone University
- Chuck Swindoll, author, founding pastor of Stonebriar Community Church
- Kenneth N. Taylor, creator of The Living Bible and the founder of Tyndale House
- Robert Thieme, author, pastor of Berachah Church, Houston, TX
- John Townsend, co-author of Boundaries: When to Say Yes, How to Say No to Take Control of Your Life
- Merrill Unger, Old Testament scholar and archeologist
- Daniel B. Wallace, New Testament textual critic
- Bruce Waltke, Old Testament scholar and former professor at Westminster Theological Seminary
- John Walvoord, Systematic Theologian
- Steven Waterhouse, pastor and Bible teacher
- Bruce Wilkinson, founder of Walk Thru the Bible

=== Current and former faculty ===
- Craig A. Blaising, professor of Systematic Theology, proponent of progressive dispensationalism
- Darrell L. Bock, senior research professor of New Testament
- Tony Evans, adjunct professor
- Buist M. Fanning, professor of New Testament studies
- John D. Hannah, scholar of Reformation Theology
- Everett F. Harrison, professor of New Testament (deceased)
- Howard Hendricks, professor of Christian Education (deceased)
- Zane C. Hodges, scholar of Free Grace Theology (deceased)
- Harold Hoehner, distinguished professor of New Testament Studies, (deceased)
- Harry A. Ironside, visiting lecturer 1925–1943 (deceased)
- David Jeremiah, adjunct professor
- David Klingler, associate professor of Bible Exposition
- John MacArthur, adjunct professor, (deceased)
- J. Vernon McGee, professor of Bible Exposition
- Eugene Merrill, distinguished professor of Old Testament Studies (emeritus)
- J. Dwight Pentecost, distinguished professor of Bible Exposition (deceased)
- Haddon Robinson, professor of Homiletics
- Charles Caldwell Ryrie, professor of Systematic Theology (deceased)
- Charles Swindoll, professor
- Merrill Unger, professor of Old Testament Studies (deceased)
- Daniel B. Wallace, professor of New Testament Studies (prolific textual critic and Greek grammarian)
- Bruce Waltke, professor of Old Testament Studies
- John Walvoord, president, professor of Systematic Theology (deceased)
- Roy B. Zuck, professor of Bible Exposition (deceased)
