= Kregel Publications =

Christian publishing company based in Grand Rapids, Michigan

- Status: Active
- Founded: 1909
- Founder: Louis Kregel
- Country of origin: United States
- Headquarters location: Grand Rapids, Michigan
- Distribution: self-distributed (US); Alban Books (UK academic); Lion Hudson (UK trade)
- Imprints: Kregel Academic; Kregel Ministry; Kregel Children's; Kregel Publications
- Official website: www.kregel.com

Kregel Publications is an Evangelical Christian book publisher based in Grand Rapids, Michigan. It has three subdivisions: Kregel Publications, Kregel Parable Bookstore, and Editorial Portavoz.

== History ==
The company was founded in 1909 by Louis Kregel as "Kregel Books". The company initially sold Dutch-language Christian books, generally imported from the Netherlands. Soon after his son, Robert Kregel (aged 20), took over the firm in 1949; the company changes its name to "Kregel Publications" and started publishing classic reprints.

Kregel Publications is the oldest of four Dutch-founded Christian publishing houses in the United States, the other three being William B. Eerdmans Publishing (in 1911), Zondervan Publishing (in 1931), and Baker Book House (in 1939), all founded and based in the Grand Rapids area.

== Subdivisions ==
=== Kregel Publications ===
Kregel Publications is a publisher of Christian fiction, non-fiction, and children's books. In addition to its own titles, the division represents Lion Hudson of Great Britain in the North American market. As such, it exclusively distributes Monarch Books, Lion Fiction, Candle Books, and the religious market distributor for Lion Books and Lion Children's Books.

=== Editorial Portavoz ===
The Editorial Portavoz publishing business responded to the influx of Hispanic/Latin Americans into the United States. The company responded to their needs and opened this Spanish-language division for the publication of Spanish-language Christian books.

=== Kregel Parable Bookstore ===
Kregel Parable Bookstore continues the initial company's book retailing tradition, serving the Grand Rapids area.
