= J. Vernon McGee =

Christian minister (1904–1988)

Dr. J. Vernon McGee
- Born: John Vernon McGee; June 17, 1904; Hillsboro, Texas, U.S.
- Died: December 1, 1988 (aged 84); Templeton, California, U.S.
- Resting place: Mountain View Cemetery and Mausoleum Altadena, California
- Education: B.Div. from Columbia Theological Seminary; Th.M. and Th.D. from Dallas Theological Seminary
- Occupations: Minister; Bible Teacher; Founder and teacher of the "Thru the Bible" radio program
- Known for: Worldwide evangelistic radio
- Spouse: Ruth Inez Jordan McGee
- Children: 2
- Website: www.ttb.org

John Vernon McGee (June 17, 1904 – December 1, 1988) was an American ordained Presbyterian minister, pastor, Bible teacher, theologian, and radio minister.

== Biography ==
=== Childhood, education, and early ministry ===
McGee was born in Hillsboro, Texas, to itinerant parents, John McGee and Carrie McGee (née Lingner). His father held many jobs, his last one being an engineer at a cotton mill in Oklahoma, where he died in 1918 when Vernon was 14 years old. After his father's death, Vernon's family relocated to Tennessee. Before entering the ministry, Vernon worked as a bank teller.

After attending Southwestern at Memphis where he majored in Greek, he graduated magna cum laude with a Bachelor of Divinity degree from Columbia Theological Seminary and Master of Theology and Doctor of Theology degrees from Dallas Theological Seminary. The bank manager for whom McGee had earlier worked paid for his seminary education. McGee's ordination occurred on June 18, 1933, at the Second Presbyterian Church in Nashville, Tennessee.

McGee's first church as a pastor was located on a red-clay hill in Midway, Georgia. He served Presbyterian churches in Decatur, Georgia; Nashville, Tennessee; and Cleburne, Texas, where he met and later married Ruth Inez Jordan. McGee and his wife moved to Pasadena, California, where he accepted the pastorate at the Lincoln Avenue Presbyterian Church in 1941. The McGees' first child, a daughter named Ruth Margaret McGee, was born prematurely and died when she was a few hours old. The McGees later had another daughter, Lynda Karah McGee, in 1946.

At the Lincoln Avenue Church, McGee started the Open Bible Hour radio program, which aired once per week. In 1949, the program was expanded to a half-hour daily schedule and renamed the High Noon Bible Class.

McGee became the pastor of the Church of the Open Door in downtown Los Angeles in 1949, succeeding Louis T. Talbot (1889–1976). That same year, McGee gave one of the daily invocations at Billy Graham's two-month-long Christ for Greater Los Angeles Campaign. In 1952, McGee was asked by evangelist and university president John Brown, owner of KGER radio station (now KLTX) in Long Beach, California, to take over a radio program (started in 1950 by young-Earth creationist Harry Rimmer, whom McGee admired) to which listeners could send in questions that were answered on the air. In the next year, 1953, another family tragedy occurred. McGee's mother was killed after being struck by an intoxicated driver in Pasadena. McGee did not press charges against the driver and only requested of the judge that justice be done. This story was told in Thru the Bible, Vol. 29: The Prophets (Jonah/Micah), Chapter 3: "The Prophet's Third Message."

By 1955, McGee had a well-publicized break with the Presbyterian Church, in which he claimed that the church's "liberal leadership [had] taken over the machinery of the presbytery with a boldness and ruthlessness that is appalling." This Fundamentalist–Modernist controversy within the Presbyterian church had been growing since the 1920s. It was during this time that a large number of nondenominational evangelical Protestant churches, such as the Moody Church in Chicago, had begun to appear across the U.S. After retiring from the pastorate at the Church of the Open Door in 1970, McGee devoted his remaining years to the Thru the Bible Radio Network. He also served as chairman of the Bible department at the Bible Institute of Los Angeles and as a visiting lecturer at Dallas Theological Seminary.

=== Thru the Bible ===
In 1967, he began broadcasting the Thru the Bible radio program (TTB). In a systematic study of each book of the Bible, McGee took his listeners from Genesis to Revelation in a two-and-a-half-year "Bible Bus trip", as he called it. He had earlier preached a "Through the Bible in a Year" series of sermons, each devoted to one chapter of the Bible, at the Church of the Open Door. After retiring from the pastorate in January 1970, and realizing that two and a half years was not enough time to teach the whole Bible, McGee completed another study of the entire Bible in a five-year period. At the time of McGee's death, the Thru the Bible program aired in 34 languages, but has since been translated into over 100 languages. It is broadcast on Trans World Radio throughout the world every weekday.

McGee advocated creationism and upheld the literal interpretation of the first chapter of the Book of Genesis, interpreting the six "days of creation" to six 24-hour periods of time. Recurring themes in the TTB broadcasts were the doctrines of Sola fide (salvation through faith alone) and [absolute] assurance of salvation, or eternal security, which proclaims that once a person sincerely accepts Christ as personal savior, there is nothing they can do, no sin they can commit, that will forfeit their salvation. He often spoke of the days of societal apostasy in Christianity and secularism that he believed he was witnessing during his lifetime, warning that spiritual apostasy was always the first of the three stages leading to the fall of nations, commonly observed throughout the Bible, the second and third being, respectively, immorality and political anarchy.

Frequently in TTB broadcasts, McGee would tell anecdotes, many from personal recollection, about prominent evangelical Christian ministers from the past century, such as G. Campbell Morgan, Lewis Sperry Chafer, Mel Trotter, and Dwight L. Moody and some of his successors at the Chicago Moody Church, such as R. A. Torrey and Harry A. Ironside. McGee also frequently referenced favorite Bible passages in his sermons, such as Galatians 6:7 (Do not be deceived: God is not mocked, for whatever one sows, that will he also reap). The continued success of the long-running TTB program has been attributed to McGee's oratorical abilities, folksy manner, and distinctive accent, as well as his insistence on maintaining the original mission, which was to spread the Scriptures with consistency of message. During one of his programs he chuckled that one of his listeners said he talked like the cartoon character Huckleberry Hound.

=== Beliefs, teachings, and writings ===
McGee received his advanced degrees from the Dallas Theological Seminary. Many Bible colleges were modeled after the Moody Bible Institute in Chicago. Dwight L. Moody, whom McGee often spoke of in his sermons, was influential in preaching the imminence of the Rapture, which is important to Dispensationalism. McGee opposed the viewpoints of Fatalism and Absolute Predestination in Calvinism. McGee rejected the Roman Catholic Church's doctrine that Peter went to and founded the Church in Rome, asserting, rather, in many sermons that the Church in Rome was founded by Paul. McGee often argued for the distinction to be made between the "false" Roman Catholic Church and the Early Church, particularly in regard to the latter's role in developing the New Testament of the Bible.

McGee was a frequent and popular summer conference speaker at the Cannon Beach Christian Conference Center in Cannon Beach, Oregon.

=== Death ===
McGee continued many speaking engagements after he retired, including throughout a bout of cancer from which he fully recovered. However, a heart problem surgically treated in 1965 resurfaced, and he died in his chair in 1988. Since his death, the five-year program of Thru the Bible has continued to air on over 800 radio stations in North America and is broadcast worldwide in more than 130 languages via radio, shortwave, and the Internet.

An obituary distributed by the Associated Press reported that McGee died of heart failure at a nursing home in Templeton, California, at age 84. His wife, Ruth, died in 1997 after suffering from dementia for nearly a decade.

=== Recognition ===
McGee was posthumously inducted into the National Religious Broadcasters Hall of Fame in 1989.

== Education and areas of service ==
Table 1: Education
Degree	Year	Institution
Bachelor of Arts (A.B.)	1930	Southwestern (Memphis, TN)
Bachelor of Divinity (B.Div.)	1933	Columbia Theological Seminary
Master of Theology (Th.M.)	1937	Dallas Theological Seminary
Doctor of Theology (Th.D.)	1940	Dallas Theological Seminary

Table 2: Pastorates
Years	Congregation	Location	Denomination
19??-19??	??	Cleveland, Texas	Presbyterian
1932-1933	Midway Presbyterian Church	Decatur, Georgia	Presbyterian
1930-1933	Westminster Presbyterian Church	Decatur, Georgia	Presbyterian
1933-1936	Second Presbyterian Church	Nashville, Tennessee	Presbyterian
May 3, 1936 – October 3, 1940	First Presbyterian Church	Cleburne, Texas	Presbyterian
1940-1948	Lincoln Avenue Presbyterian Church	Pasadena, California	Presbyterian
1949-1970	Church of the Open Door	Los Angeles, California	non-denominational

Table 3: Radio Ministries
Years	Program	Location
1941-1955	The Open Bible Hour	Pasadena, California
1955-1967	High Noon Bible Class	Pasadena, California
1967–present	Thru the Bible	Pasadena, California

=== Additional areas of service ===
- Head of the English Bible Department at the Bible Institute of Los Angeles (a.k.a. Biola University)
- Visiting lecturer at Dallas Theological Seminary
- Co-founder (1962) and teacher at the Los Angeles Bible Training School (a.k.a. LABTS)
