= Moody Bible Institute =

Bible institute in Chicago, Illinois, U.S.

- Motto: "Study to show thyself approved unto God, a workman that needeth not to be ashamed, rightly dividing the word of truth." 2 Timothy 2:15
- Type: Private Bible college
- Established: 1886; 140 years ago
- Religious affiliation: Evangelical Christian Higher Life movement
- President: Rick Melson
- Provost: Timothy Sisk
- Academic staff: 88 full-time
- Students: 2,341 (2025)
- Location: Chicago, Illinois; Spokane, Washington; Plymouth, Michigan; 41.8973°N 87.6330°W
- Campus: 10 acres (4.0 ha); Urban
- Colors: Blue and White
- Sporting affiliations: NCCAA
- Mascot: Archers
- Website: www.moodybible.org

Moody Bible Institute (MBI) is a private evangelical Christian Bible college in Chicago, Illinois. It was founded by evangelist and businessman Dwight Lyman Moody in 1886. Historically, MBI has maintained positions that have identified it as non-charismatic, zionist, dispensational, and generally Calvinistic. MBI operates undergraduate programs and Moody Theological Seminary at the Chicago campus. The Seminary also operates a satellite campus in Plymouth, Michigan. MBI also operates Moody Aviation, an undergraduate flight school and aviation mechanic program in Spokane, Washington.

== History ==
=== 20th century ===
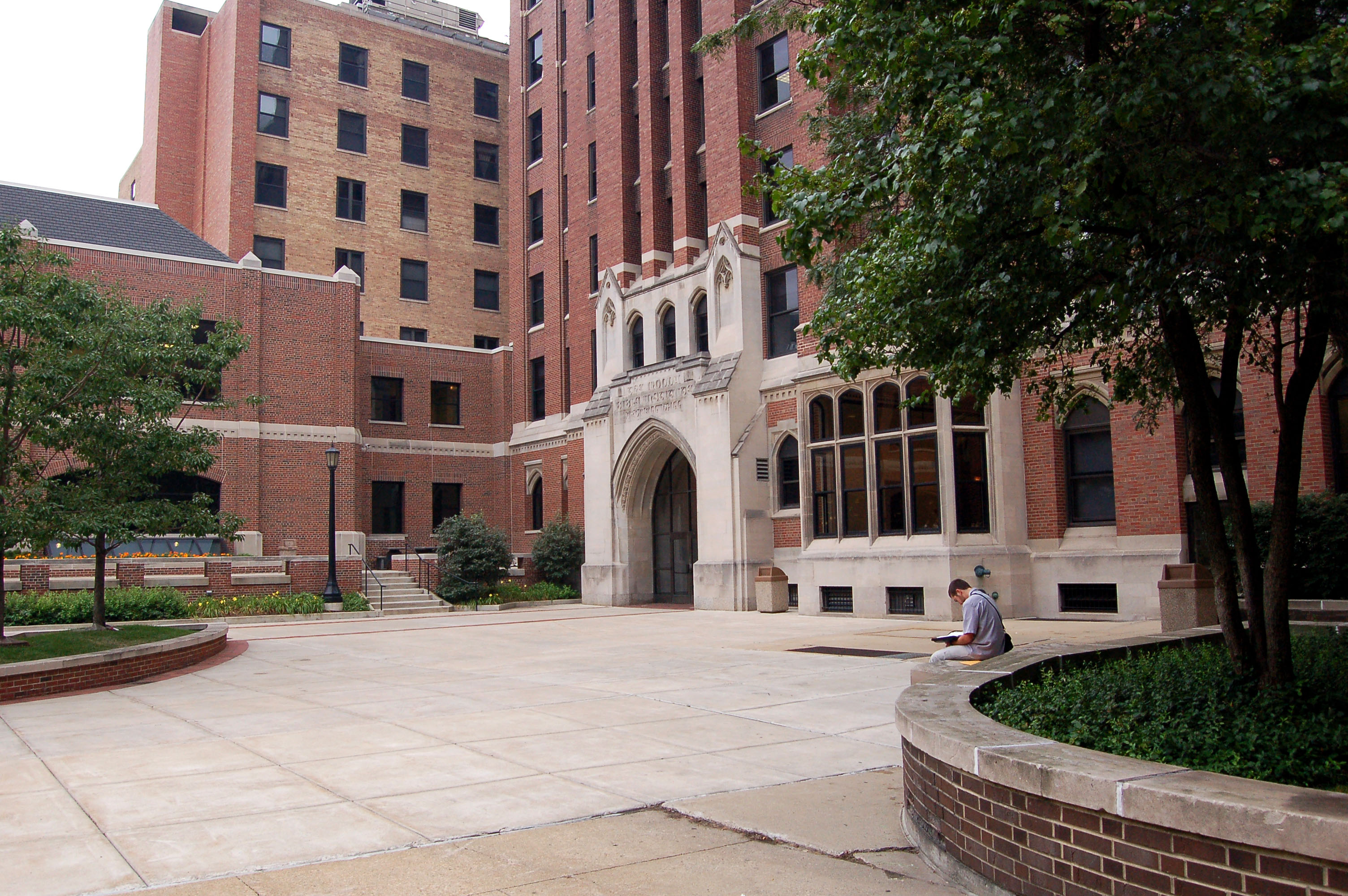
The historic Moody Bible Institute arch viewed from the central plaza

Emma Dryer organized the "May Institute", a weekly meeting for prayer and fellowship, with Moody's permission in 1883. Participants in the May Institute encouraged Moody to found a school to train young people for evangelism to carry on the Christian revival tradition.

On January 22, 1886, Moody addressed church members: "I tell you what, and what I have on my heart, I believe we have got to have gap-men: men to stand between the laity and the ministers; men who are trained to do city mission work. Take men that have the gifts and train them for the work of reaching the people." As a result of this meeting, held at Farwell Hall, the group founded the Chicago Evangelization Society for the "education and training of Christian workers, including teachers, ministers, missionaries, and musicians who may completely and effectively proclaim the gospel of Jesus Christ." The society was renamed "Moody Bible Institute" after Moody died in 1899.

Before 1900, Moody played a significant role in fund-raising to support MBI. After Moody died, however, the institute struggled financially. James M. Gray, the president of the school, invited Henry Parsons Crowell to financially restructure the institute. Crowell established the school on business principles of productivity and performance. The MBI Executive Committee met nearly every Tuesday for the next 40 years. An administration building took years to complete, but when the building was dedicated there was no mortgage and only $50,000 left to pay.

=== 21st century ===
Since 2012, MBI has received federal financial assistance, which means the religious institution is subject to federal rules, including Title IX, which prohibits sex-based discrimination. After several female students complained of being denied access to the then-male-only pastoral ministry program, the institute changed its policy in 2016. However, communications instructor Janay Garrick, who helped the students file Title IX complaints, found that her employment contract would not be renewed at the end of 2017. MBI argued that her "views on gender equity (which the college was aware of when she was hired) made her incompatible with the school." As of March 2024, Garrick is pursuing a Title VII sex-discrimination lawsuit against MBI because male colleagues "who shared her egalitarian views and joined her in speaking out against sexism on Moody Bible’s campus faced none of the harassment or retaliation directed at Garrick." MBI engaged Grand River Solutions to review its Title IX compliance and make recommendations for change.

In November 2017, the institution announced the closure of its campus in Spokane, Washington (excluding Moody Aviation) and reductions in other programs and services in response to continued drops in enrollment. Faculty were distressed by impending job losses, and penned an anonymous letter to the administration in the student newspaper expressing concerns about faculty layoffs when the administration had just committed $22 million for a new campus building. Two months later, both the President and Chief Operating Officer resigned, and the provost retired. In its announcement of these changes, the institution cited "widespread concerns over the direction" of the institution.

Mark Jobe, founder of the multisite New Life Community Church, became the new president in January 2019. In July 2019, Jobe announced a long-range plan to redevelop portions of Moody's campus. Proceeds from the sale of 8.1 acres would be earmarked for campus improvements, scholarships, endowment, and financial reserves. The "North Union" project was approved by the Chicago Plan Commission in July 2021 and by the Chicago City Council in October 2022. In January 2026, Jobe announced that he would step down as president at the end of the academic year. Timothy Sisk became interim president on July 1, 2026. It was announced on July 21, 2026, that Dr. Rick Melson would become the eleventh president of Moody Bible Institute. Melson previously served at Southwest Baptist University, Cedarville University, and Bethlehem Baptist Church with John Piper.

=== Presidents ===
No.	Name	Term	Ref
1	Dwight L. Moody (Note: Moody was titled as the superintendent of the institute.)	1886–1889	
2	Reuben Archer Torrey (Note: Torrey was initially called the superintendent and later was given the title of dean of the institute, though some sources referred to him also as the president. Although Torrey remained officially until 1908, he was mostly on leave for evangelistic trips and other endeavors after 1901.)	1889–1908	
–	Arthur Percy Fitt (Note: During the absence of Torrey after 1901, Fitt was named in several sources as the president of Moody Bible Institute.)	1901–1904	
3	James Martin Gray (Note: Gray was initially appointed dean and initially served alongside Torrey. He was later the first to be officially given the title president in 1925.)	1904–1934	
4	William Henry Houghton	1934–1947	
5	William Culbertson III (Note: Culbertson was initially acting president from 1947 to 1948 before being appointed to the full-time position.)	1947–1971	
6	George Sweeting	1971–1987	
7	Joseph Stowell	1987–2005	
8	Michael J. Easley	2005–2008	
– (Note: During this period, the school was led jointly, with Ed Cannon overseeing the business side of the office of president and Charles Dyer overseeing the spiritual side of the office.)	Ed Cannon/Charles Dyer	2008–2009	
9	J. Paul Nyquist	2009–2018	
– (Note: Served as interim president)	Greg Thornton	2018–2019	
10	Mark Jobe	2019–2026	
–	Timothy Sisk	2026–2026	
11	Rick Melson	2026-Present	

== Academics ==
MBI's stated mission is to train students for full-time ministry in churches and parachurch organizations. Since 1989, it has been accredited by the Higher Learning Commission or its predecessor. It is also accredited by the Association for Biblical Higher Education and the National Association of Schools of Music.

=== Undergraduate ===
In addition to a Bachelor of Arts degree, which is available in over two dozen fields including theology, the Bible, and ministries of various emphases, MBI offers a Bachelor of Science degree in Biblical Studies, a Bachelor of Science degree in Missionary Aviation Technology, a two-year Associates of Biblical Studies degree (ABS), and a five-year Bachelor of Music degree (BMus) in Sacred Music. Furthermore, non-degree TESOL and Biblical Studies one-year certificates are offered.

=== Graduate ===
The Moody Theological Seminary offers a Master of Divinity, Master of Arts in Biblical Studies, and a Master of Counseling/Psychology. A one-year graduate certificate is also offered.

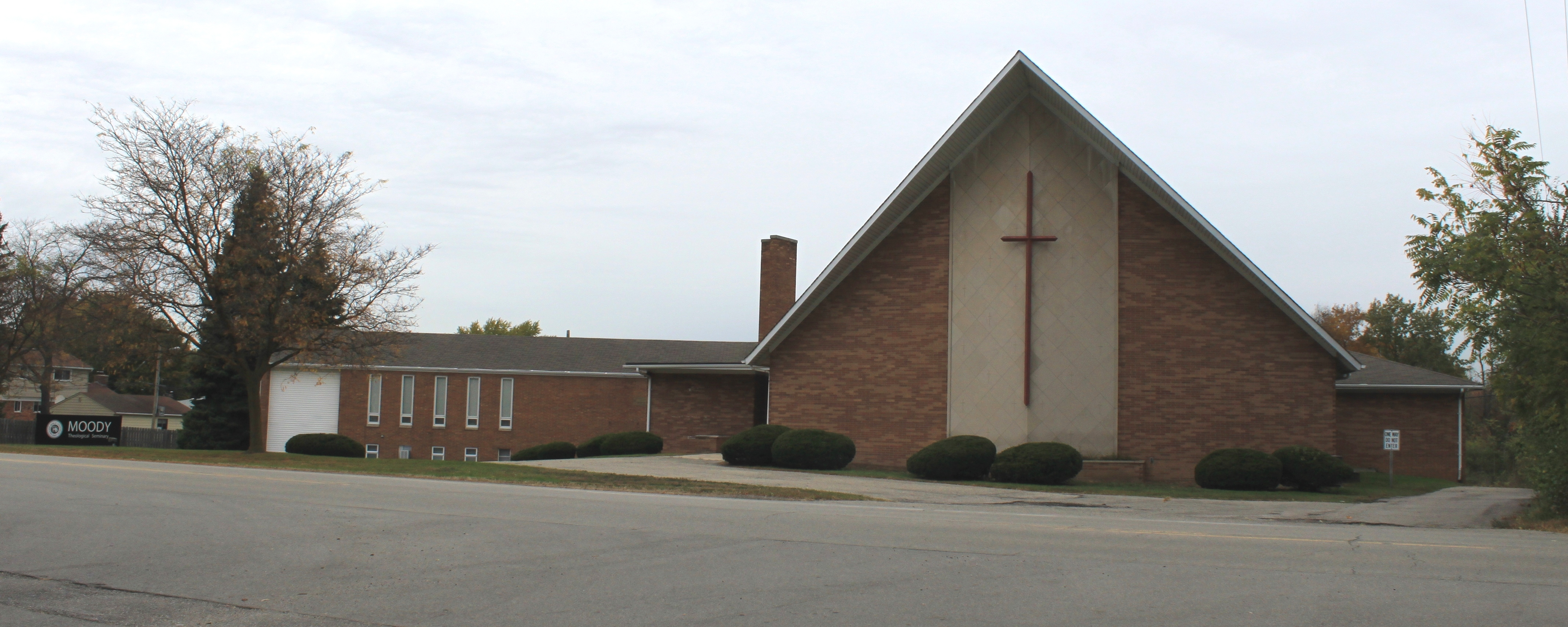
Moody Theological Seminary-Michigan

In November 2009, Moody Bible Institute and Michigan Theological Seminary jointly announced plans for Michigan Theological Seminary to merge with Moody Bible Institute's Moody Theological Seminary and Graduate School. In January 2010, Michigan Theological Seminary became Moody Theological Seminary–Michigan located in Plymouth, Michigan.

== Media ministries ==
In addition to its educational programs, Moody has two Christian media ministries: Moody Radio and Moody Publishers.

=== Moody Publishers ===
In 1894, Moody Publishers was founded under the name Bible Institute Colportage Association (BICA). Moody's son-in-law, A. P. Fitt, managed BICA operations. Publishing was contracted to Moody's brother-in-law, Fleming Revell, and his upstart publishing company. In 1895 the Colportage Library began the publication at regular intervals of books which met five specific criteria: 1. a popular readable style; 2. well-known authors or books of existing reputation; 3. strictly evangelical and nondenominational works; 4. good workmanship, and; 5. low price.

In 1941, BICA became Moody Press.

=== Moody Magazine ===
In 1900, Moody Bible Institute began publishing a monthly magazine titled The Institute Tie. In 1910, it was renamed The Christian Workers Magazine to reflect its focus on Sunday school teachers and other Christian workers. Later, it was renamed again, to Moody Bible Institute Monthly, then Moody Monthly. Moody ceased publication in 2003.

=== Moody Radio ===
In 1926, the Institute expanded its reach beyond education and publishing by sponsoring the first non-commercial Christian radio station in America, WMBI-AM (now WXES). Over time, MBI's radio outreach grew to the Moody Broadcasting Network, which now owns and operates 36 commercial-free stations and provides programming via satellite to more than 700 outlets.

== See also ==
- List of Moody Bible Institute people
