= John Elias =

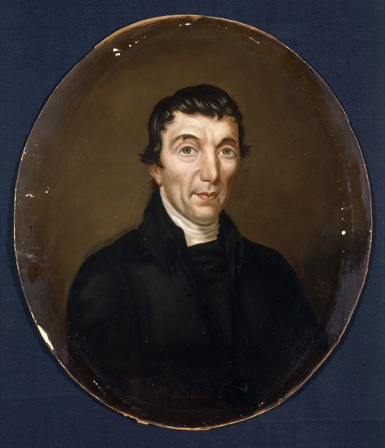
- Born: John Jones; 6 May 1774; Abererch, near Pwllheli, Wales
- Died: 8 June 1841 (aged 67); Llangefni, Anglesey, Wales

John Elias was a Christian preacher in Wales in the first half of the 19th century, as part of the Welsh Methodist revival. His preaching was noted as being exceptionally powerful, "as if talking fire down from heaven". On one occasion it is said he preached to a crowd of 10,000 people. He was a strict High-Calvinist who believed in the literal truth of the Bible. At one stage he argued strongly for the doctrine of election. He came to be known as Y Pab Methodistaidd in Welsh (The Methodist Pope) because of his forthright views. Despite his wide interests, he was a religious conservative who opposed all forms of political Radicalism as well as the assertion, popular at the time amongst Nonconformists in Wales, that "the voice of the people was the voice of God".

== Biography ==
John Elias was born at Abererch near Pwllheli on 6 May 1774 as John Jones.

For much of his early life he was brought up by his grandfather, and possessed the rare ability at the time to read both Welsh and English from an early age. He was able to read the Welsh Bible when between four and five years old. On Sundays they attended the parish church in the morning, and in the afternoon they would walk long distances together in order to hear some of the Methodist Revivalists.

The religious impressions of his younger days were deepened by a visit to Bala Association or Synod in 1792. The preaching there persuaded Elias to become further involved in the Christian faith. He left home and stayed with Griffith Jones at Penmorfa, Caernarvon, a weaver by trade and also a local preacher. Some weeks before being received into church-fellowship, he conducted family prayers during the absence from home of his master. The news of this spread abroad and caused a stir in the religious circles of the neighbourhood. They marvelled that he should pray in public. Griffith Jones commented – "His penetration and importunity in his prayers made us all marvel greatly."

"A day to remember," he wrote, "was that one day – Christmas Day in the year 1794 – when I was received a member of the Monthly Meeting, and permission was given me to preach the Gospel of Christ. I was then only twenty years and six months old, and only one year and three months old as professor of religion." His progress as a preacher was very rapid.

He proved himself to be a gifted young man, a born speaker. His passion also for work was intense. With all his might he laboured night and day in order to make amends for what was lacking in former days.

He was received into the Caernarvonshire Presbytery of the Welsh Calvinistic Methodists at Christmas 1794.

Soon after New Year's Day 1799 he moved to Anglesey. On 22 February he married Elizabeth, daughter of Richard Broadhead of Llanbadrig, Anglesey. The couple were happy, loving and deeply sympathetic with one another, they enjoyed a life of sweet companionship for over twenty-nine years, until her death on 2 April 1828. They had four children; two of them died in infancy and two survived their father.

In 1830 following his second marriage he moved to Llangefni, where he lived until the day of his death, 8 June 1841. He is buried at Llanfaes Churchyard. A celebrated clergyman of the Church of England wrote in his diary,--"To-day, June 15, was buried the greatest preacher in Wales, and, perhaps, the greatest in the kingdom. May the Lord have mercy upon his church, and favour her again with such a minister as Elias was, like a flaming seraph in the pulpit." 10000 people are estimated to have attended his funeral.

== Writings ==
John Elias was the author of numerous works in Welsh, all on a theological or doctrinal theme. He contributed regularly to the early Calvinistic Methodist periodical Y Drysorfa and wrote an autobiography, which was published long after his death. His most influential works in his day were Traethawd ar y Saboth (1804) and Golygiad Ysgrythurol ar Gyfiawnhad Pechadur (1821).

== Bibliography ==
- Edward Thomas (1905). John Elias o Fôn. Hughes a'i Fab, Wrecsam.
- Edward Morgan (1973). John Elias – life, letters and essays. Banner of Truth Trust, Edinburgh. ISBN 0-85151-174-0.
- Nigel Clifford (1994). Christian Preachers. Evangelical Press of Wales. ISBN 1-85049-114-3.
- John Elias (2006). Owen Milton (ed.). The Experimental Knowledge of Christ and Additional Sermons of John Elias (1774–1841). Iain Murray. Reformation Heritage Books. ISBN 1-892777-77-0. – includes a biographical introduction by Iain Murray
