= Martyn Lloyd-Jones =

Welsh pastor, author, and physician (1899–1981)

The Reverend Martyn Lloyd-Jones
- Born: 20 December 1899; Cardiff, Wales
- Died: 1 March 1981 (aged 81); London, England
- Education: University of London
- Occupations: Christian minister; physician; author
- Spouse: Bethan Phillips (m. 1927)

Ecclesiastical career
- Religion: Christian (Congregationalist)
- Congregations: Bethlehem, Sandfields, Port Talbot Forward Movement (Calvinistic Methodist, 1927–1939), Westminster Chapel (Congregationalist, 1939–1968)
- Website: www.mljtrust.org

David Martyn Lloyd-Jones (20 December 1899 – 1 March 1981) was a Welsh Congregationalist minister and medical doctor who was influential in the Calvinist wing of the British evangelical movement in the 20th century. For almost 30 years, he was the minister of Westminster Chapel in London.

== Biography ==
=== Early life and ministry ===
Lloyd-Jones was born in Cardiff on 20 December 1899 and raised in Llangeitho, Cardiganshire. His father was a grocer, and he had two brothers: Harold died during the 1918 flu pandemic, while Vincent went on to become a High Court judge. Llangeitho is associated with the Welsh Methodist revival, as it was the location of Daniel Rowland's ministry. Attending a London grammar school between 1914 and 1917 and then St Bartholomew's Hospital as a medical student, in 1921 he started work as assistant to the Royal Physician, Sir Thomas Horder. Lloyd-Jones obtained a medical degree from the University of London, and became a Member of the Royal College of Physicians. After struggling for two years over what he sensed was a calling to preach, in 1927 Lloyd-Jones returned to Wales, having married Bethan Phillips (with whom he later had two children, Elizabeth and Ann), accepting an invitation to minister at a church in Aberavon (Port Talbot).

In 1932 Lloyd-Jones spent nine weeks preaching at Sherbourne Street United Church in Toronto. It was there that he discovered the writings of B. B. Warfield; he described the experience as being like "stout Cortez" in John Keats' poem "On First Looking into Chapman's Homer".

=== Westminster Chapel ===
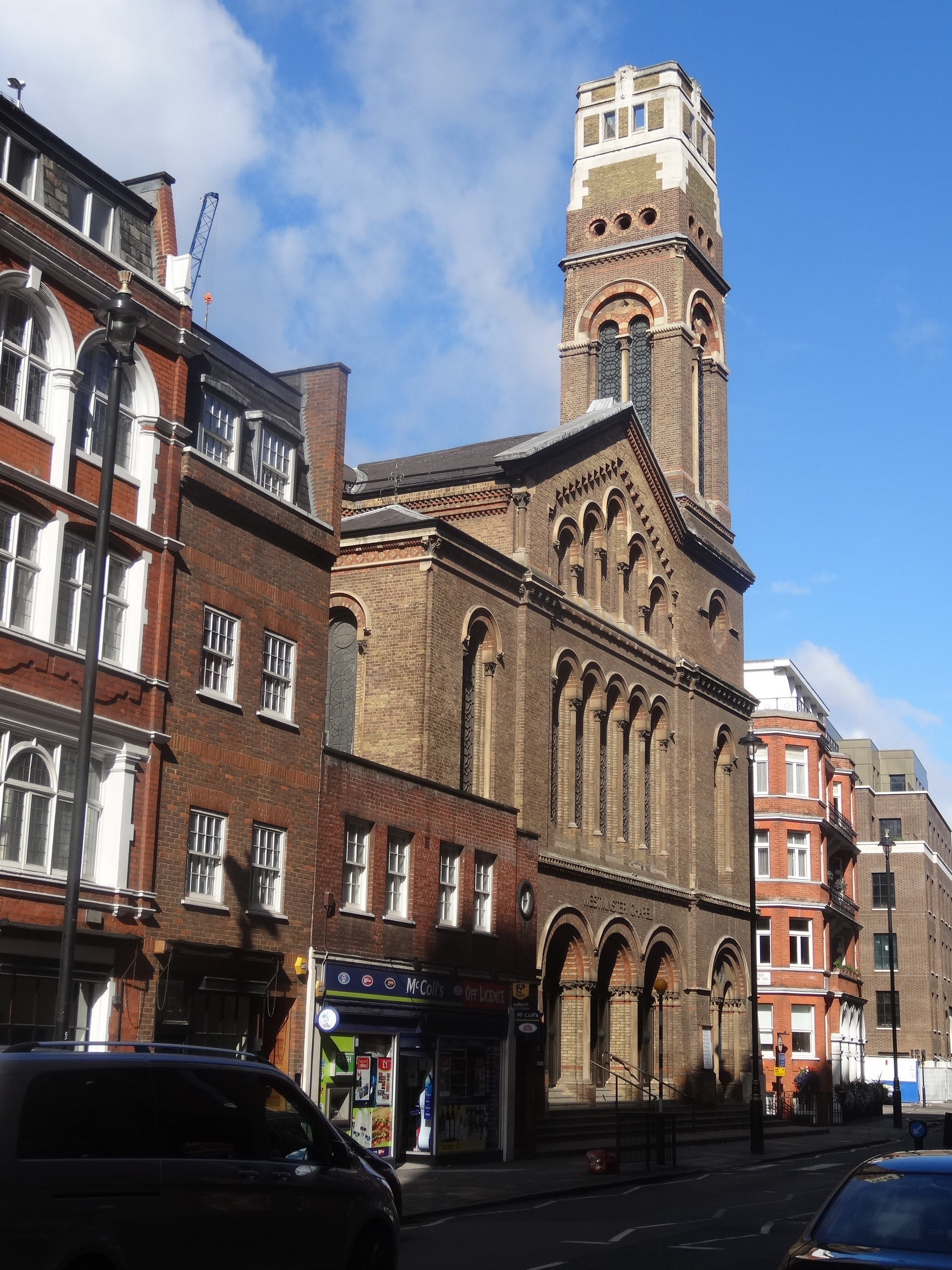
Westminster Chapel

After a decade ministering in Aberavon, in 1939 he went back to London, where he had been appointed as associate pastor of Westminster Chapel, working alongside G. Campbell Morgan. The day before he was officially to be accepted into his new position, World War II broke out in Europe. During the same year, he became the president of the Inter-Varsity Fellowship of Students, known today as the Universities and Colleges Christian Fellowship. During the war he and his family moved to Haslemere, Surrey. In 1943 Morgan retired, leaving Lloyd-Jones as the sole Pastor of Westminster Chapel.

Lloyd-Jones was strongly opposed to liberal Christianity, which had become a part of many Christian denominations; he regarded it as aberrant. He disagreed with the broad church approach and encouraged evangelical Christians (particularly Anglicans) to leave their existing denominations. He believed that true Christian fellowship was possible only among those who shared common convictions regarding the nature of the faith. Although he opposed liberal Christianity, he was sympathetic to the Liberal Party; Michael Meadowcroft said that, whilst he was member of the Chapel, Lloyd-Jones had said to him, "you could be a Christian Liberal but you couldn't be a liberal Christian."

Lloyd-Jones was well known for his style of expository preaching, and the Sunday morning and evening meetings at which he officiated drew crowds of several thousand, as did the Friday evening Bible studies, which were, in effect, sermons in the same style. He would take many months, even years, to expound a chapter of the Bible verse by verse. His sermons would often be around fifty minutes to an hour in length, attracting many students from universities and colleges in London. His sermons were also transcribed and printed (virtually verbatim) in the weekly Westminster Record.

=== Evangelical controversy ===
Lloyd-Jones provoked a major dispute in 1966 when, at the National Assembly of Evangelicals organised by the Evangelical Alliance, he called on evangelicals to withdraw from denominations in which they were "united with the people who deny and are opposed to the essential matters of salvation." This was interpreted as referring primarily to evangelicals within the Church of England, although there is disagreement over whether this was his intention as there were other denominations with liberal wings. There was also disagreement as to what the new ecclesiology he was proposing would look like in practice, although he spoke of "a fellowship, or an association, of evangelical churches."

However, Lloyd-Jones was criticised by the leading Anglican evangelical John Stott. Although Stott was not scheduled to speak, he used his position as chairman of the meeting to oppose Lloyd-Jones publicly, stating that his opinion was against history and the example of the Bible. This open clash between the two elder statesmen of British evangelicalism was widely reported in the Christian press and caused considerable controversy. Stott later apologised to Lloyd-Jones for abusing his position as chairman, and he greatly admired Lloyd-Jones's work, often quoting him in his own books.

Yet the disagreement remained and the following year saw the first National Evangelical Anglican Congress, which was held at Keele University. At this conference, largely due to Stott's influence, evangelical Anglicans committed themselves to full participation in the Church of England, rejecting the separationist approach proposed by Lloyd-Jones.

These two conferences effectively fixed the direction of a large part of the British evangelical community. Although there is an ongoing debate as to the exact nature of Lloyd-Jones's views, they undoubtedly caused the two groupings to adopt diametrically opposed positions. These positions, and the resulting split, continued largely unchanged, at least through 1996.

=== Later life ===
Lloyd-Jones retired from his ministry at Westminster Chapel in 1968, following a major surgery. In a letter dated Thursday, May 30th, 1968, published in the Westminster Record, he wrote:

..My illness has simply acted as a precipitating factor in what was becoming an increasing conviction that I should take this step. However, owing to the wonderful and affectionate bonds that have bound us together for so long, I simply could not bring myself to do it. The moment I realized that I had to undergo an operation, I felt that God was saying to me, "This is the end of one ministry and the beginning of another." I said that to my dear wife and colleague before the operation, and, ever since, this conviction has deepened and become more and more clear.

..I have completed 30 unbroken years in the ministry at Westminster and given the best years of my life to it. This has meant that I have refused invitations from various parts of the world to lecture at colleges and seminaries and to address conferences, etc., etc. But, and perhaps most important of all, it has meant that I have only been able to publish but little of what I have preached at Westminster..

It is because I am as certain that God has now called me to fulfill these tasks, as I was of his call 41 years ago, that I am taking this step and informing you of it.

As I said at the beginning, my feelings are mixed, inevitably so, and I cannot imagine what my life will be like without preaching three times each week at Westminster Chapel—apart from my summer vacation. But when God calls, He is to be obeyed in spite of all natural feelings.

..I cannot imagine a happier ministerial lot than mine has been. No minister could wish to have a more faithful and loyal people..

What things we have experienced! To a preacher nothing is so wonderful as to feel the unction of the Holy Spirit while preaching, and to hear of souls being brought under conviction of sin, and then experiencing the new birth. Thank God, that has often been our experience. But not only that, one remembers marriages, births, deaths, even war and bombing, reconstruction of buildings and many other things faced together; but above all I shall treasure the privilege of ministering to those with grievous problems of various types and enjoying the trust and confidence of those passing through deep and dark waters.

..Thus with loving and most tender greetings from my wife and myself—what I and my ministry owe to her you all know—I subscribe myself for the last time.

Your privileged and unworthy minister and friend,

D. M. Lloyd-Jones

For the rest of his life, he concentrated on editing his sermons to be published, counselling other ministers, maintaining correspondence and regularly speaking at conferences. Although having spent most of his life living and ministering in England, Lloyd-Jones kept strong ties to his native Wales, including support for the Evangelical Movement of Wales, regularly addressing their English and Welsh language conferences.

In a 1975 interview, regarding one of his recurring themes, he stated:

The important thing is this: Not the intellect only, but coming to experience and know the living God—the God who moves and stirs a man, and even takes him out of himself and makes him sing and rejoice! This joy has disappeared; we must have it back.

Lloyd-Jones preached for the last time on 8 June 1980 at Barcombe Baptist Chapel. After a lifetime of work, he died peacefully in his sleep at Ealing on 1 March 1981, St David's Day. His body was laid to rest at Newcastle Emlyn, near Cardigan, West Wales, with the memorial being held at Westminster Chapel on 6 April.

Since his death, there have been various publications regarding Lloyd-Jones and his work, including a popular biography in two volumes by Iain Murray.

== Legacy ==
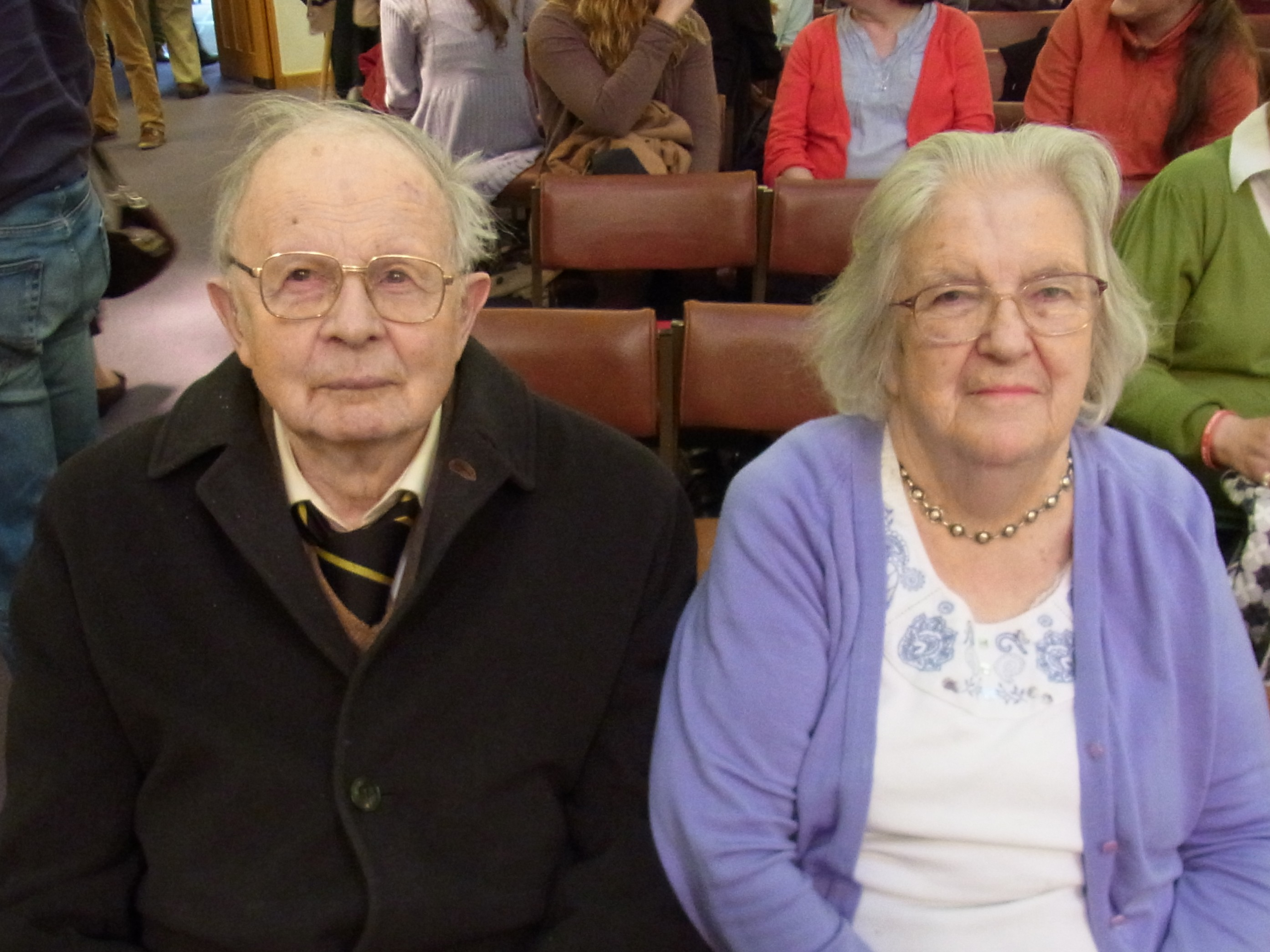
Martyn Lloyd-Jones's daughter Elizabeth and her husband, MEP and Christian writer Fred Catherwood, at Eden Baptist Church, Cambridge, 2012

=== Charismatic movement ===
Martyn Lloyd-Jones has admirers from many different denominations in the Christian Church today. One much-discussed aspect of his legacy is his relationship to the Charismatic movement. Respected by leaders of many churches associated with this movement, although not directly associated with them, he did teach the baptism with the Holy Spirit as a distinct experience rather than conversion and the regeneration of the Holy Spirit. He claimed that those who held to a single baptism in the Spirit were "quenching the Spirit." Indeed, towards the end of his life he urged his listeners to actively seek an experience of the Holy Spirit. For instance, in his exposition of Ephesians 6:10–13, published in 1976, he says:

Do you know anything of this fire? If you do not, confess it to God and acknowledge it. Repent, and ask Him to send the Spirit and His love into you until you are melted and moved, until you are filled with his love divine, and know His love to you, and rejoice in it as his child, and look forward to the hope of the coming glory. "Quench not the Spirit", but rather "be filled with the Spirit" and "rejoice in Christ Jesus".

Part of Lloyd-Jones's stress of the Christian's need of the baptism with the Holy Spirit was due to his belief that this provides an overwhelming assurance of God's love to the Christian, and thereby enables him to boldly witness for Christ to an unbelieving world.

Aside from his insistence that the baptism with the Spirit is a work of Jesus Christ distinct from regeneration, rather than the filling of the Holy Spirit, Lloyd-Jones also opposed cessationism, claiming that the doctrine is not founded upon Scripture. In fact, he requested that Banner of Truth Trust, the publishing company he co-founded, publish his works on the subject only after his death. Lloyd-Jones continued to proclaim the necessity of the active working of God in the world, and the need for God to miraculously demonstrate His power so that Christian preachers and others witnessing for Christ might otherwise gain a hearing in a contemporary world that is hostile to Christianity. In Lloyd-Jones's words,

I think it is quite without scriptural warrant to say all these gifts ended with the apostles or the apostolic era. I believe there have been undoubted miracles since then. At the same time most of the claimed miracles by the Pentecostalists and others certainly do not belong to that category and can be explained psychologically or in other ways. I am also of the opinion that most, if not all, of the people claiming to speak in tongues at the present time are certainly under a psychological rather than a spiritual influence. But again I would not dare to say that "tongues" are impossible at the present time.

=== Preaching ===
Lloyd-Jones seldom agreed to preach live on television – the exact number of occasions is not known, but it was most likely only once or twice. His reasoning behind this decision was that this type of "controlled" preaching, preaching that is constrained by time limits, "militates against the freedom of the Spirit." In other words, he believed that the preacher should be free to follow the leading of the Holy Spirit concerning the length of time in which he is allowed to preach. He recorded that he once asked a television executive who wanted him to preach on television, "What would happen to your programmes if the Holy Spirit suddenly descended upon the preacher and possessed him; what would happen to your programmes?"

Lloyd-Jones was one of the most influential preachers of the twentieth century. Many volumes of his sermons have been published by Banner of Truth, as well as other publishing companies. In his book Preaching and Preachers, Zondervan, 1971, Lloyd-Jones describes his views on preaching, or what might be called his doctrine of homiletics. In this book, he defines preaching as "logic on fire." The meaning of this definition is demonstrated throughout the book in which he describes his own preaching style that had developed over his many years of ministry.

His preaching style may be summarised as "logic on fire" for several reasons. First, he believed that the use of logic was vital for the preacher, but his view of logic was not the same as that of the Enlightenment. This is why he called it logic "on fire". The fire has to do with the activity and power of the Holy Spirit. He therefore believed that preaching was the logical demonstration of the truth of a given passage of Scripture with the aid, or unction, of the Holy Spirit. This view manifested itself in the form of Lloyd-Jones's sermons. Lloyd-Jones believed that true preaching was always expository. This means he believed that the primary purpose of the sermon was to reveal and expand the primary teaching of the scripture under consideration. Once the primary teaching was revealed, he would then logically expand this theme, demonstrating that it was a biblical doctrine by showing that it was taught in other passages in the Bible, and using logic to demonstrate its practical use and necessity for the hearer. With this being the case, he laboured in his book Preaching and Preachers to caution young preachers against what he deemed as "commentary-style" preaching as well as "topical" preaching.

Lloyd-Jones's preaching style was therefore set apart by his exposition of biblical doctrine and his fire and passion in its delivery. He is a preacher who continued in the Puritan tradition of experimental preaching. Theologian and preacher J. I. Packer, who wrote that he had "never heard such preaching." It came to him "with the force of electric shock, bringing to at least one of his listeners more of a sense of God than any other man".

Once, while unfolding to his congregation the internal work of the Holy Spirit in the life of a Christian, Lloyd-Jones marvelled at his experience preaching.

I say it again to the glory of God, this pulpit is the most romantic place in the universe as far as I'm concerned, and for this reason, that I never know what's going to happen when I get here. Never. My anticipations are often falsified on both sides. This is wonderful. The temptation for the preacher, you see, is to think that if he has prepared what he regards as a good sermon, it's going to be a wonderful service, and it sometimes can be a very bad one. On the other hand, the poor man may have had a very difficult and a trying week. He may have been very ill, a thousand and one things may have happened to him, and he may go into the pulpit with fear and trembling, feeling that he hasn't done his work; he's got nothing. And it may be one of the most glorious services he has ever had the privilege of conducting. Why? Because he doesn't control the power [within of the Holy Spirit]. It varies. And not only in preaching but in daily life and experience. It is the well of water that is within us and we don't control it. It controls us.

Lloyd-Jones was a supporter of the Evangelical Library in London.

=== MLJ Trust ===
Shortly after his death, a charitable trust was established to continue Lloyd-Jones's ministry by making recordings of his sermons available. The organisation currently has 1,600 sermons available and also produces a weekly radio programme using this material.

== Works ==
- Lloyd-Jones, David Martyn (2003) [1939], Why Does God Allow War? A General Justification of the Ways of God, Crossway (originally Hodder & Stoughton), ISBN 978-1-58134-469-1.
- ——— (1973) [1942], The Plight of Man and The Power of God, Marshall Pickering (originally Abingdon), ISBN 978-0-7208-0097-5.
- ——— (1956) [1951], Truth Unchanged, Unchanging, James Clarke (originally Revell).
- ——— (2011) [1953], From Fear to Faith: Studies in the Book of Habakkuk, IVP, ISBN 978-1-84474-500-5.
- ——— (1984) [1958], Authority, The Banner of Truth Trust (originally IVP), ISBN 978-0-8515-1386-7.
- ——— (1976) [1958], Studies in the Sermon on the Mount, Eerdmans, ISBN 978-0-8028-0036-7.
- ——— (2008) [1963], Faith on Trial: Studies in Psalm 73, Christian Focus (originally IVP), ISBN 978-1-84550-375-8.
- ——— (1998) [1964], Spiritual Depression: Its Causes and Cures (2nd revised ed.), Marshall Pickering (originally Eerdmans), ISBN 978-0-5510-3165-4.
- ——— (1971), Preaching & Preachers, Hodder & Stoughton; Zondervan.
- ——— (1971a) [1970], Romans, vol. An Exposition of Chapters 3:20–4:25 – Atonement and Justification, Zondervan (originally Banner of Truth), ISBN 978-0-310-27880-1.
- ——— (1971b), Romans, vol. An Exposition of Chapter 5 – Assurance, Banner of Truth.
- ——— (1972), Romans, vol. An Exposition of Chapter 6 – The New Man, Banner of Truth.
- ——— (1981) [1972], God's Way of Reconciliation: An Exposition of Ephesians 2, Banner of Truth (originally Baker), ISBN 978-0-85151-299-0.
- ——— (1973), Life in the Spirit in Marriage, Home and Work: An Exposition of Ephesians 5:18–6:9, Baker.
- ——— (1973), Romans: An Exposition of Chapter 1 — The Gospel of God, Banner of Truth.
- ——— (1974), Romans: An Exposition of Chapter 7:1–8:4 — The Law: Its Functions and Limits, Banner of Truth.
- ——— (1974), Romans: An Exposition of Chapter 8:5–17 — The Sons of God, Banner of Truth.
- ——— (1975), Romans: An Exposition of Chapter 8:17–39 — The Final Perseverance of the Saints, Banner of Truth.
- ——— (1976), The Christian Warfare: An Exposition of Ephesians 6:10–13, Grand Rapids: Baker.
- ——— (1977), The Christian Soldier: An Exposition of Ephesians 6:10–20, Baker.
- ——— (1978), God's Ultimate Purpose: An Exposition of Ephesians 1, Baker.
- ——— (1979), The Unsearchable Riches of Christ: An Exposition of Ephesians 3, Baker.
- ——— (1980), Christian Unity: An Exposition of Ephesians 4:1–16, Baker.
- ——— (1982), Darkness and Light: An Exposition of Ephesians 4:17–5:17, Baker.
- ——— (1983), Evangelistic Sermons at Aberavon, Banner of Truth.
- ——— (1983), Expository Sermons on 2 Peter, Banner of Truth.
- ——— (1984), Joy Unspeakable: Power and Renewal in the Holy Spirit, Kingsway.
- ——— (1986), The Cross: God's Way of Salvation, Crossway.
- ——— (1987), The Puritans: Their Origins and Successors, Banner of Truth
- ——— (1987), Revival, Crossway.
- ——— (1989), Knowing the Times: Addresses Delivered on Various Occasions, 1942–77, Banner of Truth.
- ——— (1989), Romans: An Exposition of Chapter 2:1–3:20 — The Righteous Judgment of God, Banner of Truth.
- ——— (1992), What Is an Evangelical?, Banner of Truth.
- ——— (2002) [1993], Catherwood, Christopher (ed.), The Life in Christ: Studies in 1 John, vol. 1 – Fellowship with God, Crossway, ISBN 978-1-58134-439-4
- ——— (1993), Life in Christ: Studies in 1 John, vol. 2 – Walking with God, Crossway.
- ——— (1994), Life in Christ: Studies in 1 John, vol. 3 – Children of God, Crossway.
- ——— (1994), Life in Christ: Studies in 1 John, vol. 4 – The Love of God, Crossway.
- ——— (1994), Life in Christ: Studies in 1 John, vol. 5 – Life of God, Crossway.
- ——— (1994), Letters: 1919–1981, Banner of Truth.
- ——— (1995), Out of the Depths: Restoring Fellowship with God, Crossway.
- ——— (1996), Old Testament Evangelistic Sermons, Banner of Truth.
- ——— (1997), Romans: An Exposition of Chapter 10 — Saving Faith, Banner of Truth.
- ——— (1997), True Happiness: An Exposition of Psalm One, Bryntirion.
- ——— (1996), Great Doctrines of the Bible, vol. 1: God the Father, God the Son, Crossway.
- ——— (1997), Great Doctrines of the Bible, vol. 2: God the Holy Spirit, Crossway.
- ——— (1998), Great Doctrines of the Bible, vol. 3: The Church and the Last Things, Crossway.
- ——— (1999), The Life of Joy and Peace: An Exposition of Philippians, Baker Books, ISBN 978-0-8010-5816-5.
- ——— (1999), God's Way Not Ours: Sermons on Isaiah 1:1–18, Banner of Truth.
- ——— (1999), Let Everybody Praise the Lord: An Exposition of Psalm 107, Bryntirion.
- ——— (1999), Authentic Christianity: Sermons on the Acts of the Apostles, vol. 1: Acts 1–3, Banner of Truth.
- ——— (1999), Romans, vol. An Exposition of Chapter 11 – To God's Glory, Banner of Truth.
- ——— (2000), Romans, vol. An Exposition of Chapter 12 – Christian Conduct, Banner of Truth.
- ——— (2000), The Assurance of Our Salvation: Exploring the Depth of Jesus Prayer for His Own (Studies in John 17), Crossway.
- ——— (2000), Heirs of Salvation: Studies in Biblical Assurance, Bryntirion.
- ——— (2000), Studies in the Book of Acts, vol. 1: Authentic Christianity, Crossway.
- ——— (2001), Studies in the Book of Acts, vol. 2: Courageous Christianity, Crossway.
- ——— (2001), Authentic Christianity: Sermons on the Acts of the Apostles, vol. 2: Acts 4–5, Banner of Truth.
- ——— (2001), True Happiness: Psalms 1 and 107, Crossway.
- ——— (2002), Life in Christ: Studies in 1 John (The Original Five Volumes in One), Crossway.
- ——— (2003), Authentic Christianity: Sermons on the Acts of the Apostles, vol. 3: Acts 5:17–6:8, Banner of Truth.
- ——— (2003), Great Doctrines of the Bible, vol. 1–3, Crossway.
- ——— (2003), Romans, vol. An Exposition of Chapter 13 – Life in Two Kingdoms, Banner of Truth.
- ——— (2003), Romans, vol. An Exposition of Chapter 14:1–17 – Liberty And Conscience, Banner of Truth.
- ——— (2003), Studies in the Book of Acts, vol. 3: Victorious Christianity, Crossway.
- ——— (2004), Studies in the Book of Acts, vol. 4: Glorious Christianity, Crossway.
- ——— (2004), Authentic Christianity: Sermons on the Acts of the Apostles, vol. 4: Acts 7:1–29, Banner of Truth.
- ——— (2005), The All-Sufficient God: Sermons on Isaiah 40, Banner of Truth.
- ——— (2005), Seeking the Face of God: Nine Reflections on the Psalms, Crossway.
- ——— (2006), Authentic Christianity: Sermons on the Acts of the Apostles, vol. 5: Acts 7:30–60, Banner of Truth.
- ——— (2006), Authentic Christianity: Sermons on the Acts of the Apostles, vol. 6: Acts 8:1–35, Banner of Truth.
- ——— (2007), Raising Children God's Way, Banner of Truth.
- ——— (2008), The Christian in an Age of Terror: Sermons for a Time of War, Kregel.
- ——— (2009), The Gospel in Genesis: From Fig Leaves to Faith, Crossway.
- ——— (2009), Let Not Your Heart Be Troubled, Crossway.
- ——— (2009), Living Water: Studies in John 4, Crossway.
- ——— (2010), The Kingdom of God, Crossway.
- ———, The Power Within (audio) (sermon), MLJ Trust.
- ——— (2011), Out of the Depths: Psalm 51, Christian Focus.
