= Iain Murray (author) =

British pastor and author (born 1931)

The Reverend Iain Murray
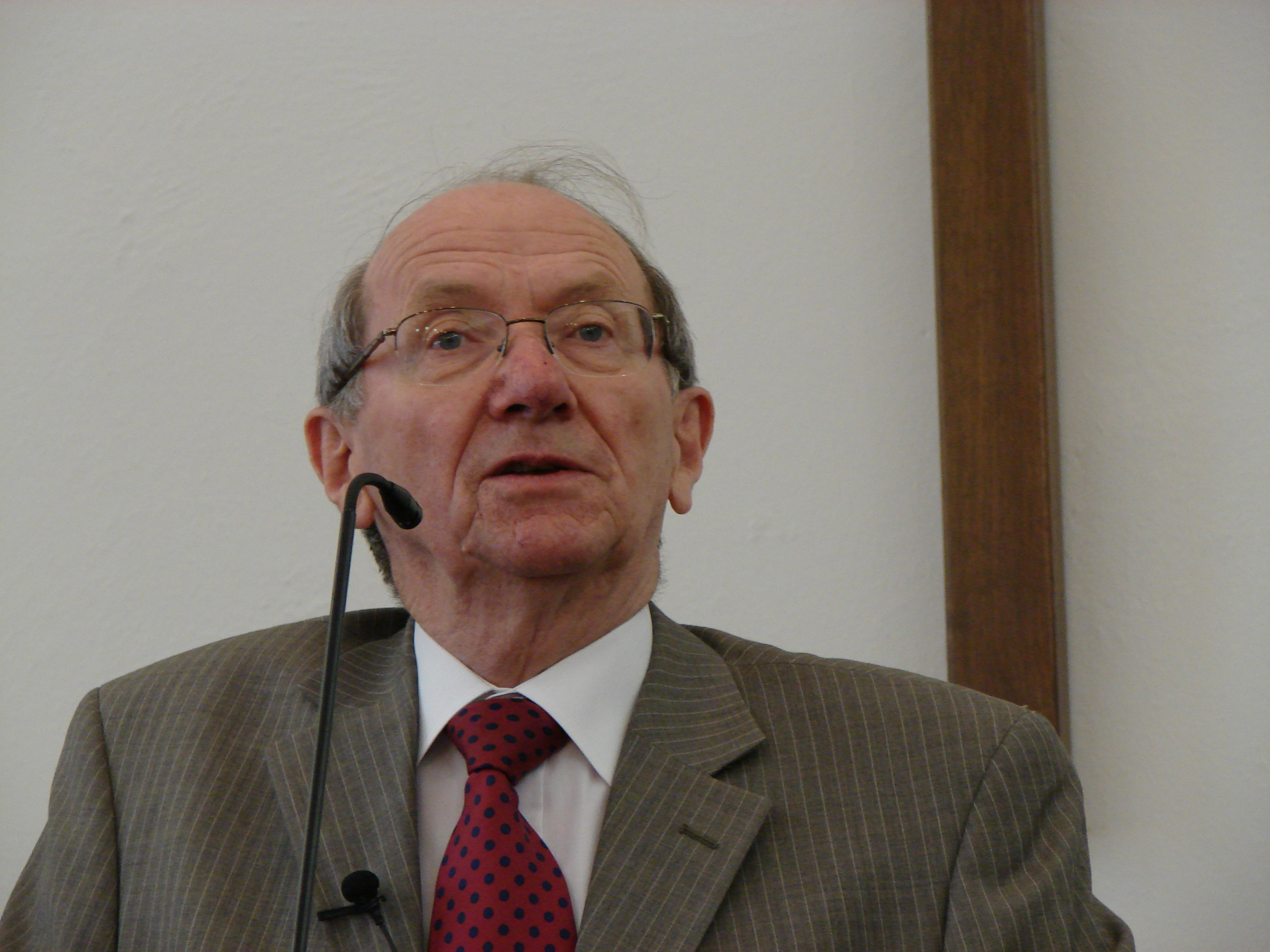
- Murray at Draper's Valley Presbyterian Church, Virginia, in 2009
- Born: 19 April 1931 (age 94); Lancashire, England
- Education: University of Durham
- Known for: Assisting Martyn Lloyd-Jones at Westminster Chapel; Founding Banner of Truth Trust
- Title: Editorial Director
- Website: banneroftruth.org

Iain Hamish Murray (born 19 April 1931) is a British pastor and author who co-founded the Reformed publishing house, the Banner of Truth Trust.

== Early life ==
Iain Murray was born on 19 April 1931. He was educated in the Isle of Man at King William's College. Murray was converted in 1949.

In the summer of 1950 he was commissioned in the Cameronians (Scottish Rifles) rifle regiment of the British Army, serving in Singapore and Malaya in the suppression of the communist insurgency known as the "Malayan Emergency". He transferred to the Army reserve in 1955 and resigned his commission the following year.

After his military service, Murray studied Philosophy and History at the University of Durham, graduating with a BA in 1954. In 1955 he married Jean Ann Walters and became assistant minister at St. John's Free Church, Summertown, Oxford.

== Christian work ==
Murray served as assistant to Martyn Lloyd-Jones at Westminster Chapel (1956–59) and subsequently at Grove Chapel, London (1961–69) and St. Giles Presbyterian Church, Sydney, Australia, (1981–84). In 1957 he and Jack Cullum founded the Reformed publishing house, the Banner of Truth Trust, for which he remains a trustee.

Murray and his wife Jean Ann lived together in Edinburgh, Scotland for 69 years, till she died in March 2024.

== Theological positions ==
According to certain sources Murray's theological positions are:

- 5-point Calvinist
- Paedobaptist (advocates infant baptism)
- Post-millennial
- Covenant theology

== Works ==
Books by Iain Murray include:

- Australian Christian Life from 1788 : an introduction and an anthology, (1988), ISBN 0-85151-524-X
- D. Martyn Lloyd-Jones : The First Forty Years, (1982), ISBN 0-85151-353-0
- D. Martyn Lloyd-Jones : The Fight of Faith, (1990), ISBN 0-85151-564-9
- The Forgotten Spurgeon, (1966), ISBN 0-85151-156-2
- Spurgeon and the Church of England, (1966) – a booklet
- Jonathan Edwards : A New Biography, (1988), ISBN 0-85151-494-4
- The Life of Arthur W. Pink, ISBN 0-85151-883-4
- The Life of John Murray : Professor of Systematic Theology, Westminster Theological Seminary, Philadelphia, Pennsylvania 1937–1966, (1984), ISBN 0-85151-422-7, ISBN 0-85151-426-X
- The Puritan Hope : Revival and the Interpretation of Prophecy, (1971, London: Banner of Truth Trust), ISBN 0-85151-247-X (pbk)
- Revival & Revivalism : The Making and Marring of American Evangelicalism 1750–1858, (1994), ISBN 0-85151-660-2
- Spurgeon v. Hyper-Calvinism : The Battle for Gospel Preaching, (1995, London: Banner of Truth Trust), ISBN 0-85151-692-0 (pbk)
- Pentecost today? : The Biblical Basis for Understanding Revival, (1998), ISBN 0-85151-752-8
- Evangelicalism Divided : A Record of Crucial Change in the Years 1950 to 2000, (2000), ISBN 0-85151-783-8
- Diary of Kenneth MacRae : a record of fifty years in the Christian ministry, (1980), ISBN 0-85151-297-6
- The Invitation System, (1960), ISBN 0-85151-171-6
- Letters of Charles Haddon Spurgeon , (1992), ISBN 0-85151-606-8
- Should the Psalter be the only hymnal of the church?, (2001), ISBN 0-85151-809-5
- The Reformation of the Church : a collection of Reformed and Puritan documents on Church issues, (1965), ISBN 0-85151-118-X (pbk)
- The Unresolved Controversy : unity with non-Evangelicals, (2001), ISBN 0-85151-810-9 (pbk)
- Wesley and Men Who Followed, ISBN 0-85151-835-4
- Old Evangelicalism – Old Truths for a New Awakening, ISBN 0-85151-901-6
- The Happy Man: The Abiding Witness of Lachlan Mackenzie, (1979), ISBN 0-85151-282-8
- A Scottish Christian Heritage, (2006), ISBN 0-85151-930-X
- Lloyd-Jones: Messenger of Grace, (2008), ISBN 0-85151-975-X
- Heroes, (2009), ISBN 978-1-84871-024-5
- The Undercover Revolution: how fiction changed Britain, (2009), ISBN 978-1-84871-012-2
- Rest in God: a calamity in contemporary Christianity, (2010), ISBN 978-1-84871-081-8 (booklet)
- John MacArthur: Servant of the Word and Flock, (2011), ISBN 978-1-84871-112-9
- Archibald G. Brown: Spurgeon's Successor, (2011), ISBN 978-1-84871-139-6
- Evangelical Holiness and other addresses, (2013), ISBN 978-1-84871-319-2
- Amy Carmichael: Beauty for Ashes, (2015), ISBN 978-1-84871-552-3
- J. C. Ryle: Prepared to Stand Alone, (2016), ISBN 978-1-84871-679-7
