= John Henry Jowett =

British Protestant preacher and author

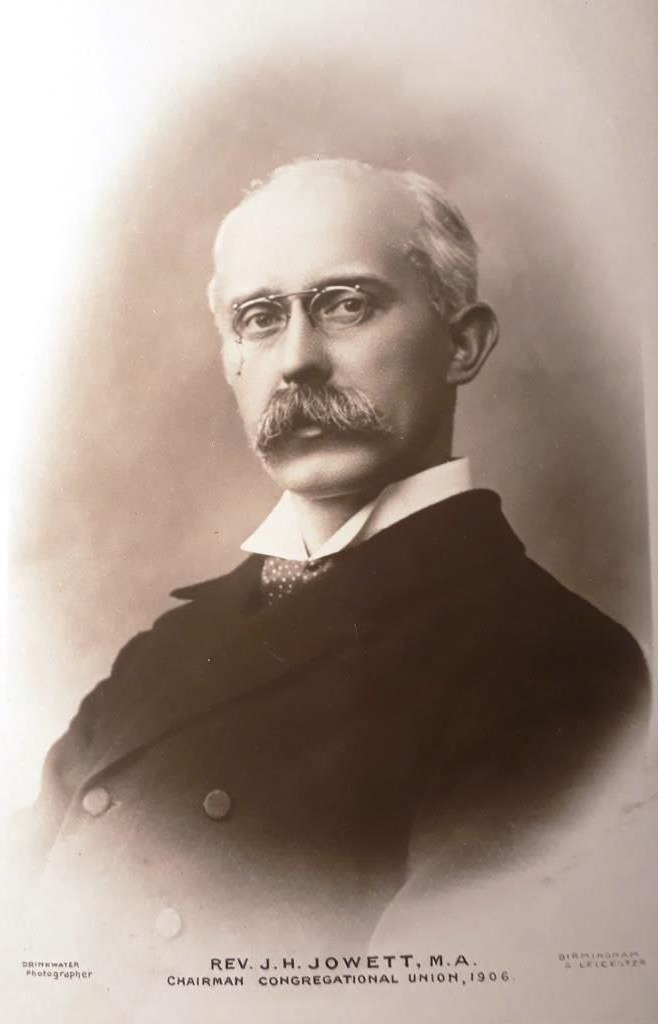
Jowett in 1906

John Henry Jowett CH (25 August 1863 – 19 December 1923) was an influential British Protestant minister and preacher at the turn of the nineteenth to the twentieth century, who wrote books on topics related to Christian living. Warren W. Wiersbe called him "The greatest preacher in the English-speaking world."

== Early life ==
Jowett was born 25 August 1863 at Beaumont Town, Northowram near Halifax, West Riding of Yorkshire, one of six children born to Josiah Jowett and Hannah Marshall, who attended the congregational church in Halifax. Jowett's father was a master tailor and draper. His great-aunt through his mother was the notable English soprano singer Susan Sunderland.

== Career and influence ==
Jowett was educated at Hipperholme Grammar School. He was influenced by the congregationalist Reverend Enoch Mellor (incumbent at Square Chapel, Halifax, between 1867 and 1881), and determined to become a preacher. He later studied at Airedale College, Bradford, followed by the University of Edinburgh and Mansfield College, Oxford. He subsequently served at St James' Congregational Church in Newcastle upon Tyne, followed by Carr's Lane Congregational Church in Birmingham, where he succeeded R. W. Dale, advocate of the Civic Gospel.

Jowett understood the problems faced by workers and while the pastor at Carr's Lane Congregational Church in Birmingham, England, founded the Digbeth Institute, now an arts center. At this period he was elected chairman of the Congregational Union and president of the National Council of Evangelical Free Churches.

Jowett served at the Fifth Avenue Presbyterian Church, New York, from 1911 to 1918, then Westminster Chapel from 1918 to 1922, when he retired due to ill-health, dying the following year.

In the 1922 Dissolution Honours as suggested by David Lloyd George to King George V, Jowett was made one of the 50 members of the Order of the Companions of Honour, along with Winston Churchill.

== Personal life ==
Jowett married Lizzie Ann Winpenny in 1890 at Barnard Castle. The couple adopted one child, Monica.

== Published works ==
Jowett authored numerous works on Christian devotion, preaching, and biblical studies.

=== Devotional books ===
- Jowett, J. H. The Folly of Unbelief : and Other Meditations for Quiet Moments.
- Jowett, J. H. (1905). Yet Another Day; A Prayer for Every Day of the Year. New York,: F.H. Revell Company.
- Jowett, J. H. (1913). Things that Matter Most; Devotional Papers. New York,: F.H. Revell.
- Jowett, J. H. (1914). My Daily Meditation for the Circling Year. Nashville, Tenn.: Broadman Press.
- Jowett, J. H. (1916). The whole armour of God. New York, Chicago [etc.] Fleming H. Revell company.
- Jowett, J. H. (1920). "Come Ye Apart", Daily exercises in Prayer and Devotion. New York,: Revell.
- Jowett, J. H. (1923). Brooks by the Traveller's Way; 26 Weeknight Addresses. New York,: Christian Herald.

=== Works on the Bible ===
- Jowett, J. H. (1902). Thirsting for the Springs Twenty-six weeknight meditations.
- Jowett, J. H. (1906). The Epistles of St. Peter. New York,: Armstrong.
- Jowett, J. H. (1909). The High Calling Meditations on St. Paul's Letter to the Philippians. New York: Fleming H. Revell.
- Jowett, J. H. The Redeemed Family of God, Studies in the Epistles of Peter. New York,: Hodder.
- Jowett, J. H. (1922). The Friend on the road and other studies in the Gospels. New York,: George H. Doran company.
- Jowett, J. H. (1925). Life in the Heights; Studies in the Epistles.
- Jowett, J. H. (1924). Springs in the Desert; Studies in the Psalms. New York,: George H. Doran Company.
- Jowett, J. H. (1922). The Eagle Life and Other Studies in the Old Testament. New York,: George H. Doran company.

=== Books of sermons and books on preaching and on the church ===
- Jowett, J. H. (1901). Apostolic Optimism, and Other Sermons.
- Jowett, J. H. (1905). The Passion for Souls. New York, Chicago: Fleming H. Revell Co.
- Jowett, J. H. (1910). The Transfigured Church. New York,: Fleming H. Revell Co.
- Jowett, J. H. (1910). The School of Calvary. London,: James Clarke & Co. Printed by Bradbury Agnew London & Tonbridge
- Jowett, J. H. (1912). The Preacher, His Life and Work. Yale Lectures. New York: Harper & Brothers.
