= G. Campbell Morgan =

British evangelist (1863–1945)

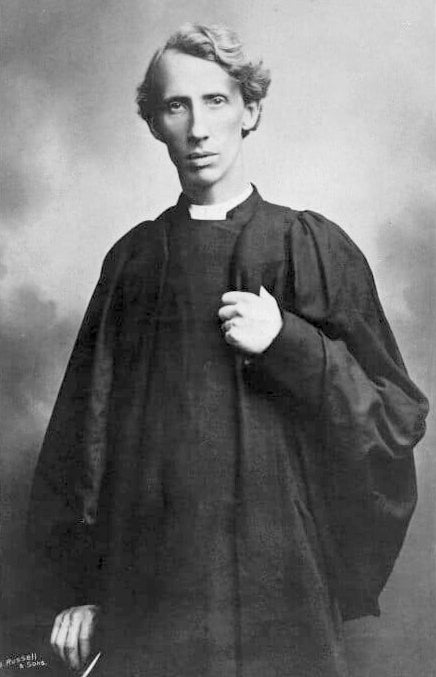
Rev G. Campbell Morgan c. 1906

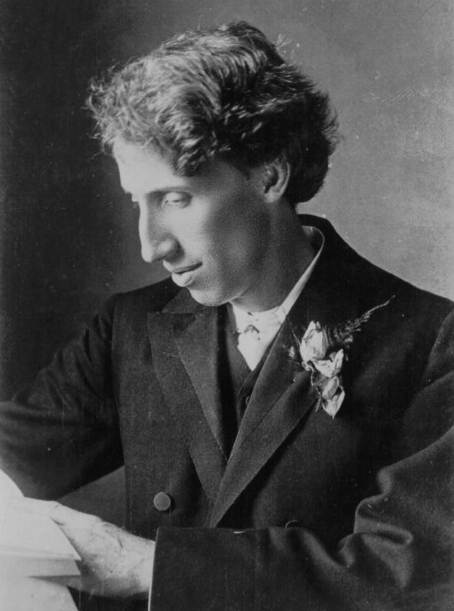
Rev G. Campbell Morgan in 1907

Reverend Doctor George Campbell Morgan D.D. (9 December 1863 – 16 May 1945) was a British evangelist, preacher, a leading Bible teacher, and a prolific author.

A contemporary of Rodney "Gipsy" Smith, Morgan preached his first sermon at age 13. He was the pastor of Westminster Chapel in London from 1904 to 1919, pausing for 14 years to teach at Biola in Los Angeles, and returning to the Chapel from 1933 to 1943 when he handed over the pastorate to the renowned Martyn Lloyd-Jones, after having shared it with him and mentored him since 1939. From 1911 to 1914 he was the president of Cheshunt College, Cambridge.

== Biography ==
Morgan was born on a farm in Tetbury, England, the son of Welshman George Morgan and Elizabeth Fawn Brittan. His father was a member of the strict Plymouth Brethren but resigned and became a Baptist minister. He was very sickly as a child, could not attend school, and so was tutored at home.

When Campbell was 10 years old, D. L. Moody came to England for the first time. His ministry, combined with the dedication of his parents, made such an impression on young Morgan that at the age of 13 he preached his first sermon. Two years later he was preaching regularly in country chapels during his Sundays and holidays.

By 1883 he was teaching in Birmingham. However, in 1886, at the age of 23, he left the teaching profession and devoted himself to preaching and Bible exposition. In the same year he married his cousin Nancy. He was ordained to the Congregational ministry in 1890. He had no formal training for the ministry, but his devotion to studying the Bible made him one of the leading Bible teachers of his day. His reputation as preacher and Bible expositor grew throughout Britain and spread to the United States.

In 1896 Moody invited him to lecture to the students at the Moody Bible Institute. This was the first of 54 visits to America to preach and teach. After the death of Moody in 1899 Morgan assumed the position of director of the Northfield Bible Conference. He was given a Doctor of Divinity degree by the Chicago Theological Seminary in 1902. After five successful years in this capacity, he returned to England in 1904 and became pastor of Westminster Chapel in London. During two years of this ministry he was President of Cheshunt College in Cambridge. His preaching and weekly Friday night Bible classes were attended by thousands. In 1910 Morgan contributed an essay entitled The Purposes of the Incarnation to the first volume of The Fundamentals, 90 essays which are widely considered to be the foundation of the modern Fundamentalist movement.

Leaving Westminster Chapel in 1919, he once again returned to the United States, where he conducted an itinerant preaching and teaching ministry for 14 years. He returned to England in 1933, where he again became pastor of Westminster Chapel and remained there until his retirement in 1943. He was instrumental in bringing Martyn Lloyd-Jones to Westminster in 1939 to share the pulpit and become his successor. Morgan was a friend of F. B. Meyer, Charles Spurgeon, and many other great preachers of his day.

Morgan died on 16 May 1945, at the age of 81.

== Covenant Theology ==
For most of his life Campbell Morgan taught the dispensational view on Israel and the Jews, but towards the end of his life he changed his views to Covenant Theology.

He wrote this in a letter in 1943: "I am quite convinced that all the promises made to Israel are found, are finding and will find their perfect fulfillment in the church. It is true that in time past, in my expositions, I gave a definite place to Israel in the purposes of God. I have now come to the conviction, as I have just said, that it is the new and spiritual Israel that is intended." (Letter to Rev. H. F. Wright, New Brunswick, Victoria)

== Publications ==
Morgan was a prolific author, writing about 80 works in his lifetime. This number does not include the 10-volume set of sermons, "The Westminster Pulpit," his messages from the "Mundesley" conference, his sermons that were published independently as booklets and pamphlets, nor the posthumous works. He wrote commentaries on the entire Bible, and on many devotional topics related to the Christian life and ministry.

His essay entitled "The Purposes of the Incarnation" was included in a famous and historic collection called The Fundamentals, a set of 90 essays edited by the famous R. A. Torrey, who himself was successor to D. L. Moody both as an evangelist and pastor. The Fundamentals is widely considered to be the foundation of the modern Fundamentalist movement.

His most important works include:

- Discipleship (1897)
- The True Estimate of Life and How to Live (1897)
- God's Methods with Man in Time: Past Present and Future (1898)
- Wherein Have We Robbed God? Malachi’s Message for the Men of Today (1898)
- The Hidden Years at Nazareth (1898)
- Life's Problems (1899)
- The Spirit of God (1900)
- All Things New, A Message to New Converts (1901)
- The Ten Commandments (1901)
- God's Perfect Will (1901)
- Missionary Work. Why We Must Do it How We Must... (1901)
- A First Century Message to Twentieth Century Christians (1902)
- The Letters of Our Lord (1902)
- To Die is Gain (1903)
- The Crises of the Christ (1903)
- Lessons of the Welsh Revival (1904)
- Evangelism (1904)
- The Life of the Christian (1904)
- The Christ of Today: What? Whence? Whither? (1905)
- The Practice of Prayer (1906)
- The Parables of the Kingdom (1907)
- The Simple Things of the Christian Life (1907)
- The Analyzed Bible vol. 1 (Genesis to Esther) (1907)
- The Analyzed Bible vol. 2 (Job to Malachi) (1908)
- The Analyzed Bible vol. 3 (Matthew to Revelation) (1908)
- Christian Principles (1908)
- Mountains and Valleys in the Ministry of Jesus (1908)
- The Analyzed Bible vol. 4 (The Gospel According to John) (1909)
- The Analyzed Bible vol. 5 (The Book of Job) (1909)
- The Analyzed Bible vol. 6 (The Epistle of Paul the Apostle to the Romans) (1909)
- The Missionary Manifesto (1909)
- The Bible and the Cross (1909)
- The Analyzed Bible vol. 7 (The Prophecy of Isaiah v.1) (1910)
- The Analyzed Bible vol. 8 (The Prophecy of Isaiah v.2) (1910)
- The Study and Teaching of the English Bible (1910)
- The Purposes of the Incarnation (1910)
- The Analyzed Bible vol. 9 (The Book of Genesis) (1911)
- The Analyzed Bible vol. 10 (The Gospel According to Matthew) (1911)
- Living Messages of the Books of the Bible, Vol. 1: Old Testament (1912)
- Living Messages of the Books of the Bible, Vol. 2: Old Testament (1912)
- Sunrise, "Behold, He Cometh!": An Introduction to a Study of the Second Advent (1912)
- The Teaching of Christ (1913)
- God, Humanity and the War (1914)
- The Ministry of the Word (1919)
- The Bible in Five Years (1922)
- The Acts of the Apostles (1924)
- Searchlights from the Word; Being 1188 Sermon-Suggestions, One from Every Chapter in the Bible (1926)
- The Gospel According to Mark (1927)
- The Romance of the Bible (1928)
- Christ and the Bible (1929)
- Categorical Imperatives of the Christian Faith (1930)
- Divine Guidance and Human Advice (1930)
- Great Themes of the Christian Faith, as presented by G. Campbell Morgan, and others (1930)
- The Bible and the Child (1931)
- Two Principles of Magna Charta (1931)
- The Gospel According to Luke (1931)
- Life: A Quest and the Way of Conquest (1932)
- The Purpose of the Gospel (1934)
- Hosea, The Heart and Holiness of God (1934)
- Studies in the Prophecy of Jeremiah (1934)
- The Answer of Jesus to Job (1935)
- Great Chapters of the Bible (1935)
- God's Last Word to Man, Studies in Hebrews (1936)
- The Great Physician; The Method of Jesus with Individuals (1937)
- Peter and the Church (1937)
- Preaching (1937)
- The Bible Four Hundred Years After 1538 (1938)
- Voices of Twelve Hebrew Prophets, Commonly Called the Minor Prophets, (1939)
- The Bible: Four Hundred Years After 1538, Some Constructive Reconsiderations (1939)
- The Voice of the Devil (1941)
- The Parables and Metaphors of Our Lord (1942)
- The Triumphs of Faith (1944)
- The Music of Life (1944)

Posthumous:

- The Corinthian Letters of Paul (1946)
- Notes on the Psalms (1947)
- The Parable of the Father's Heart (1947)
- This Was His Faith: The Expository Letters of G. Campbell Morgan (1952)
- The Westminster Pulpit: the Preaching of G. Campbell Morgan, vol. 1-10 (1954, Publisher: Baker Book House)
- An Exposition of the Whole Bible (1959)
- The Unfolding Message of the Bible (1961)
- The Birth of the Church (1968)

Contributions to other titles:

- Gipsy Smith: His Life and Work (1909, Introduction to the American edition)

Biographies:

- G. Campbell Morgan, Bible Teacher: A Sketch of the Great Expositor and Evangelist by Harold Murray (1938)
- A Man of the Word, Life of G. Campbell Morgan by Jill Morgan (1951)
- The Expository Method of G. Campbell Morgan by Don M. Wagner

== Resources ==
- Reynolds, Francis J., ed. (1921). "Morgan, G. Campbell" . Collier's New Encyclopedia. Vol. 6. New York: P. F. Collier & Son Company. p. 305.
- Some content comes from Theopedia.com (G. Campbell Morgan), and is under the Creative Commons Attribution 3.0 Unported license. More information on this license is available at https://creativecommons.org/licenses/by/3.0/
- Murray, Harold. G. Campbell Morgan: Bible Teacher. Ambassador-Emerald International, 1999. ISBN 1-84030-046-9
