= Susan Sunderland =

British singer (1819–1905)

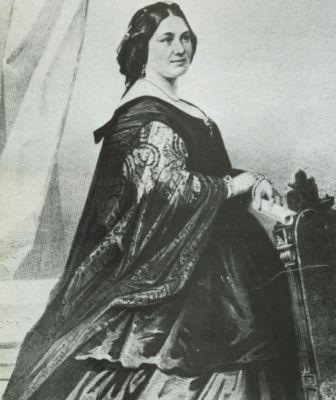
- Born: Susanna Sykes; 30 April 1819; Brighouse, West Riding of Yorkshire, England
- Died: 7 May 1905 (aged 86)
- Occupation: Soprano
- Spouse: Henry Sunderland

Susan Sunderland (born Susanna Sykes) and known as the 'Calderdale Nightingale' and 'The Yorkshire Queen of Song' (30 April 1819 – 7 May 1905) was an English soprano. Some years after she retired, the annual Mrs Sunderland Music Festival was organised in Huddersfield, which is still running in the 21st century.

== Life ==
Sunderland was born in Brighouse, West Riding of Yorkshire in 1819, daughter of James Sykes and Hannah Smith. Her father was head gardener for the Radcliffe family (cousins of Sir Joseph Radcliffe, 1st Baronet) at Smith House, Lightcliffe. The property was later sold to Ann Walker.

Her soprano voice was discovered in 1831 by blacksmith Luke Settle, whilst she was singing in her garden. As well as being a blacksmith, Settle was also choirmaster of Brighouse parish church and provided her early training.

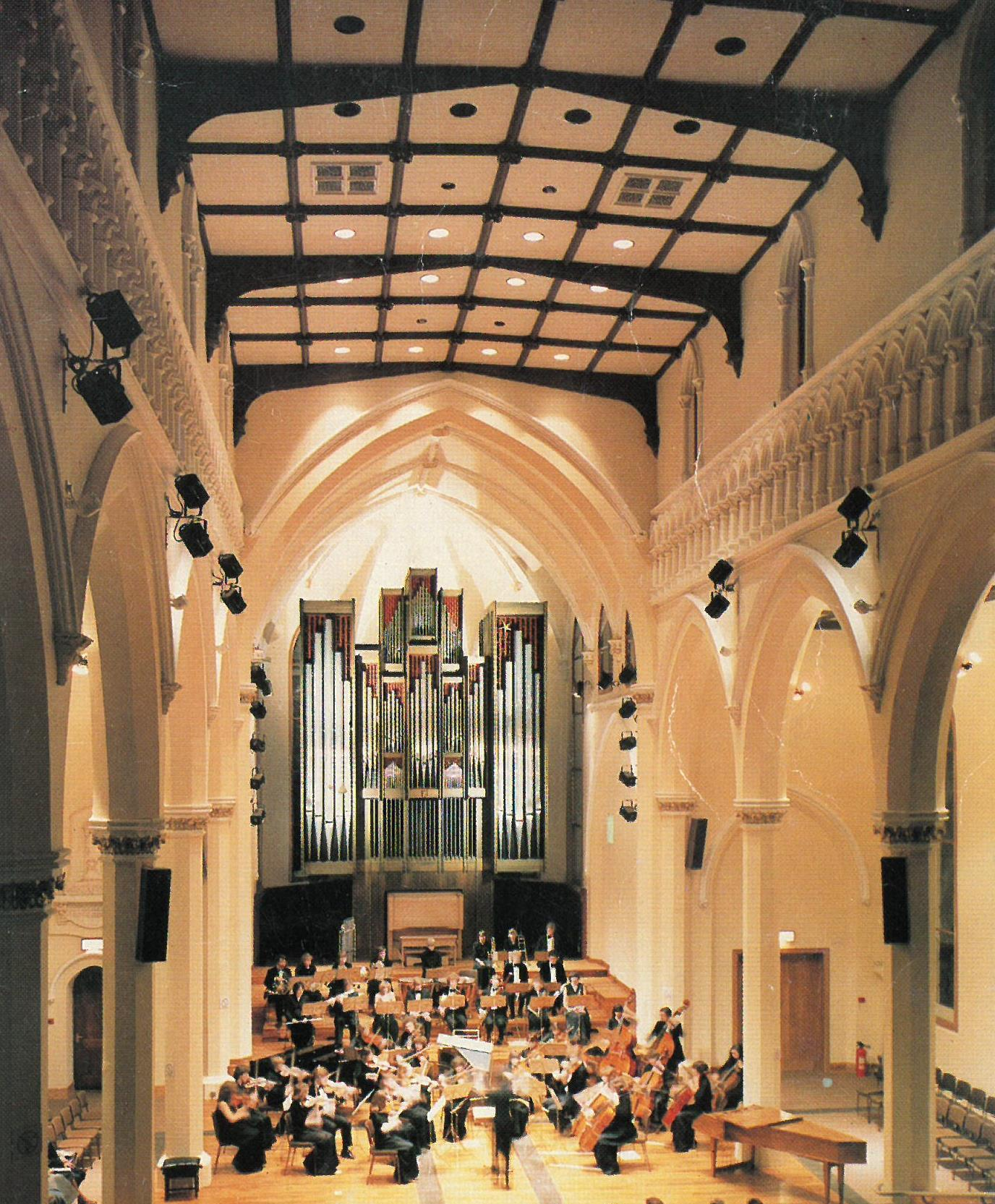
St Paul's, the church where she sang, became a concert hall in 1979

Sunderland was fifteen when she gave her first concert. Opportunities outside the area were restricted as there were no railways at the time. When she gave a concert in Huddersfield or performed as principal soprano at St Paul's Church, she would walk thirty miles in a day, often arriving home two hours after midnight. She performed “Wise men flattering” by Handel and “The Captive Greek Girl” by Hobbes at the first Leeds Chamber Concert (around 1835). She later performed in London, and travelled around England, Ireland and Scotland. She sang at the opening of Leeds Town Hall in 1858, singing before Queen Victoria, who later invited her to sing at Buckingham Palace. She retired in 1864.

== The annual "Mrs Sunderland Music Festival" ==
In 1888 she had been married for fifty years and a celebration was organised, at which she was given an illuminated manuscript to celebrate her skills. After this a group of people decided that there should be an annual competition to find more leading women soloists. In April 1889 the first annual "Mrs Sunderland Festival" took place in Huddersfield with Mrs Sunderland presenting the prizes to the winners. It was a singing competition initially for female soloists but it was expanded to include pianists and violin players on alternate years. The music festival has expanded further and in the 21st century it occupies nine days at Huddersfield Town Hall. The festival in February 2020 was the 131st and it included choirs, ensembles, instrumentalists and spoken performances including those in the local dialect.

== Personal life ==
She married Henry Sunderland in 1838, and together they had six children. Her great-nephew was the minister and preacher John Henry Jowett, and a nephew, William Sykes, was Chairman and Managing Director of John Smith's Brewery at Tadcaster.

Solid Silver medal inscribed around it's circumference "Knowl Bank Council School Choir 1st Prize 1906 J Griffiths"

Solid Silver medal inscribed around it's circumference "Knowl Bank Council School Choir 1st Prize 1906 J Griffiths"
