= Abererch =

Coordinates: 52.902°N 4.386°W

Aber-erch
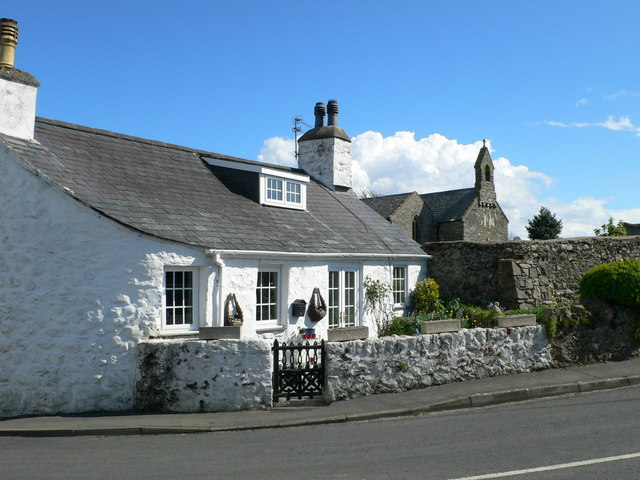
- Aber-erch

- Location within Gwynedd
- Population: 1,354 (Ward 2011)
- OS grid reference: SH395365
- Community: Llannor
- Principal area: Gwynedd
- Preserved county: Gwynedd
- Country: Wales
- Sovereign state: United Kingdom
- Post town: PWLLHELI
- Postcode district: LL53
- Dialling code: 01758
- Police: North Wales
- Fire: North Wales
- Ambulance: Welsh
- UK Parliament: Dwyfor Meirionnydd
- Senedd Cymru – Welsh Parliament: Gwynedd Maldwyn

Aber-erch ([abɛrˈɛrχ], Welsh for "Mouth of the Erch") is a small village and former civil parish on the Llŷn Peninsula in the Welsh county of Gwynedd. The village lies approximately 1 mile (1.6 km) east of Pwllheli. A river, the Afon Erch runs through the village.

The parish was abolished in 1934 and incorporated into that of Llannor, now the community of Llannor. It is a mostly Welsh-speaking village and its name is often truncated to "Berch" [bɛrχ] in the local Welsh dialect.

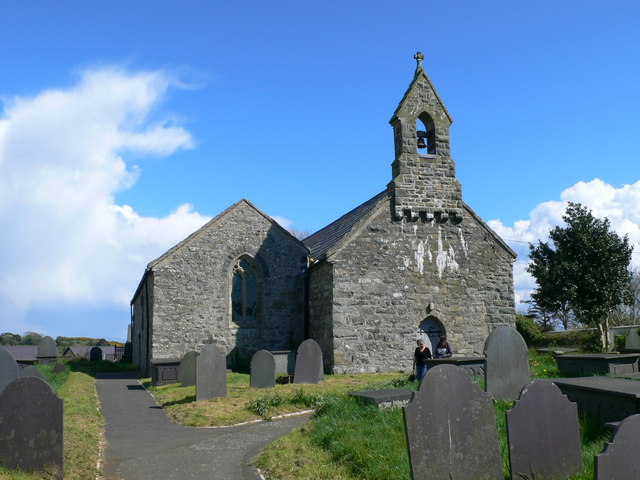
Church of St Cawrdaf

There is a primary school, playschool, and a railway station. The Church of St Cawrdaf is a grade I listed building.

Aber-erch has a beach called 'Traeth Glan y Don' (which roughly translates to 'Shore of the wave beach') which extends from Morfa'r Garreg, Pwllheli to Pen-ychain. Parking for the beach is near the railway station. From the beach you have a view of Harlech Castle in the east all the way down to Tywyn (on a clearer day even further south) and to the west Pwllheli and the St Tudwal's Islands. Access to the beach is through a footpath next the caravan and camp-site. This beach is ideal for days when the wind is from the north or north west due to the sheltered bay.

The ward includes the village of Y Ffor and the small settlement of Penrhos.

== Notable people ==
- John Elias (1774-1841), a powerful Christian preacher: "as if talking fire down from heaven"
- Ellis Owen Ellis (1813-1861), a Welsh portrait painter, cartoonist and illustrator.
