= St Cawrdaf's Church, Abererch =

St Cawrdaf's Church
- Eglwys Cawrdaf Sant
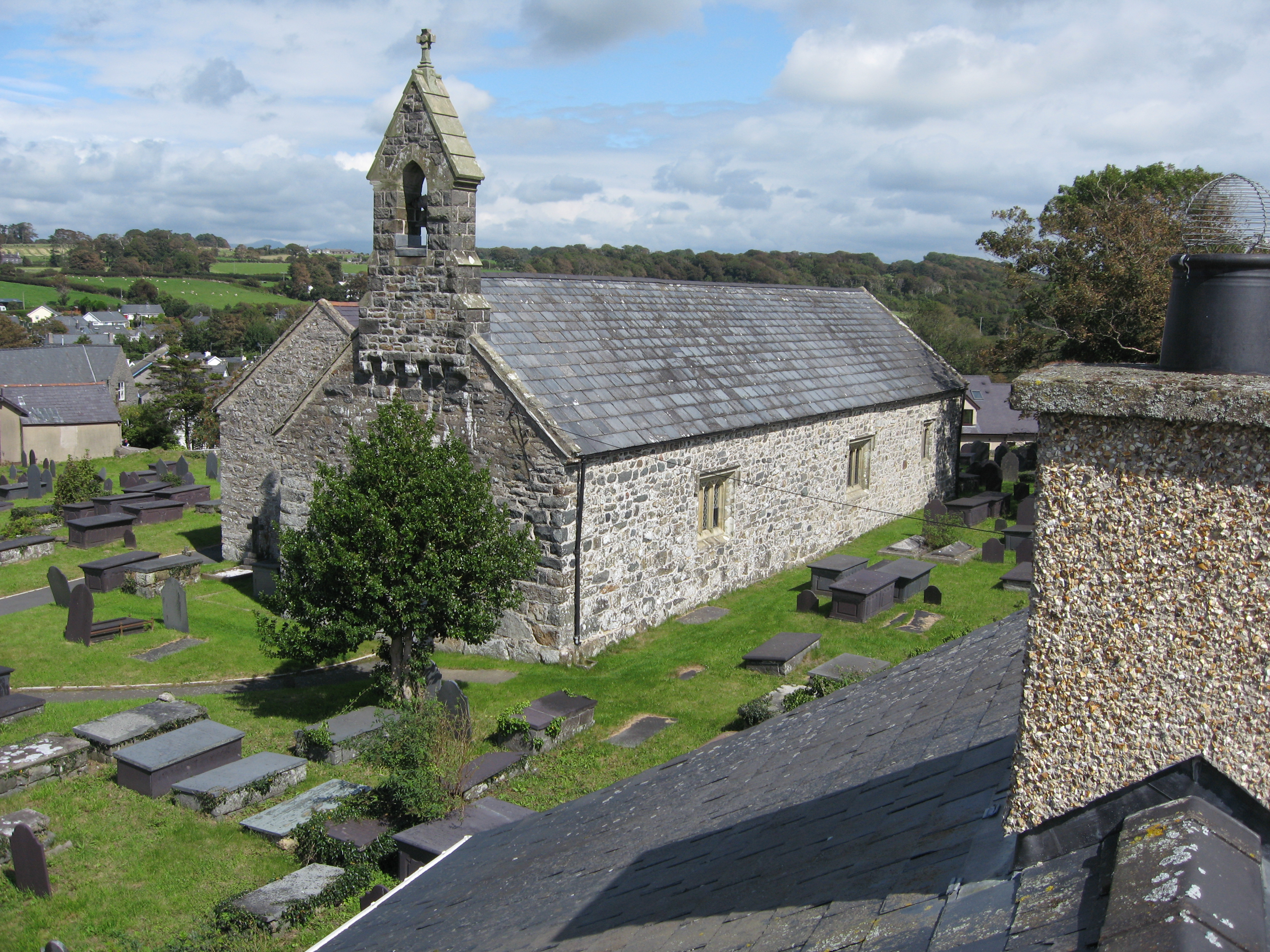

- Location in Gwynedd
- 52.9027°N 4.3854°W
- Location: Abererch, Gwynedd
- Country: Wales
- Denomination: Anglican (Church in Wales)

History
- Status: Parish church
- Founder: Cawrdaf
- Dedication: Cawrdaf

Architecture
- Functional status: Active
- Heritage designation: Grade I
- Designated: 19 October 1971

Administration
- Diocese: Bangor
- Archdeaconry: Meirionnydd
- Benefice: Synod Meirionnydd
- Parish: Bro Eifionydd

St Cawrdaf's Church is located on the western edge of the village of Abererch, Gwynedd, Wales. The church is dedicated to Cawrdaf, a Welsh saint. It is a Grade I listed building.

== History ==
The village of Abererch stands approximately 1 mile (1.6 km) east of Pwllheli, just inland from the southern coast of the Llŷn Peninsula. The church stands on the western edge of the village and is dedicated to Cawrdaf, a Welsh saint. No life of Cawrdaf exists, but he may have been a prince of Ferreg in South-eastern Wales. As the churches dedicated to him are not in that locality, it has been surmised that he abdicated and become a priest. His saint's day is 5 December. The church dates from the 14th century, although there was certainly a predecessor building as it is mentioned in the Norwich Taxation of 1254, when it was a property of Beddgelet Priory. Extensions were made in the 15th and 16th centuries and restoration by the Bangor Diocesan architect, Henry Kennedy in the 19th.

The church remains an active parish church in the Diocese of Bangor and occasional services are held.

== Architecture and description ==
The church has a combined nave and chancel with a north aisle and a bellcote above. The building material is local rubble with sandstone dressings. Richard Haslam, Julian Orbach and Adam Voelcker, in their 2009 edition Gywnedd, in the Buildings of Wales series, note that "of the elaborate late Medieval fittings, only the stalls survive". The Royal Commission on the Ancient and Historical Monuments of Wales (RCAHMW) considers them of particular note with, "misericords carved with roses and lilies, and upturned carved masks". The church Heritage Record suggests that they may have come from St Mary's Abbey on Bardsey Island. St Cawrdaf's is a Grade I listed building. The church hall, and a monument in the churchyard to the Picton Jones family are both listed at Grade II.

== Gallery ==
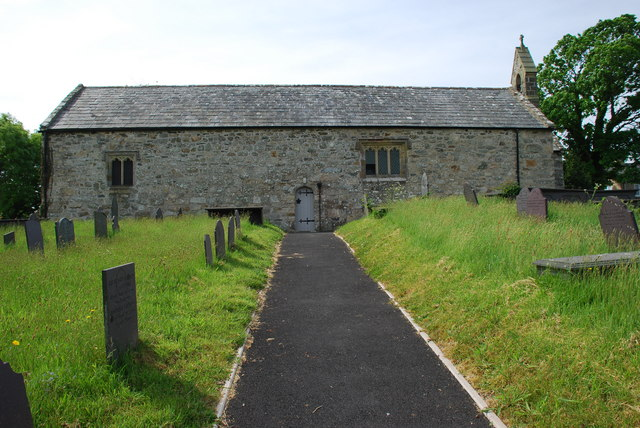
Exterior - side view

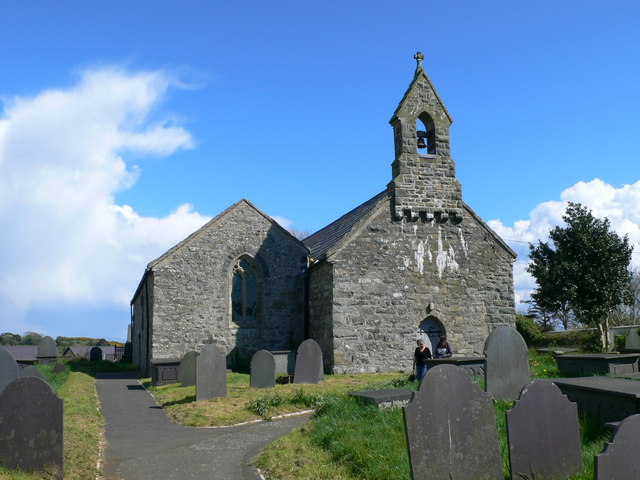
Exterior - view

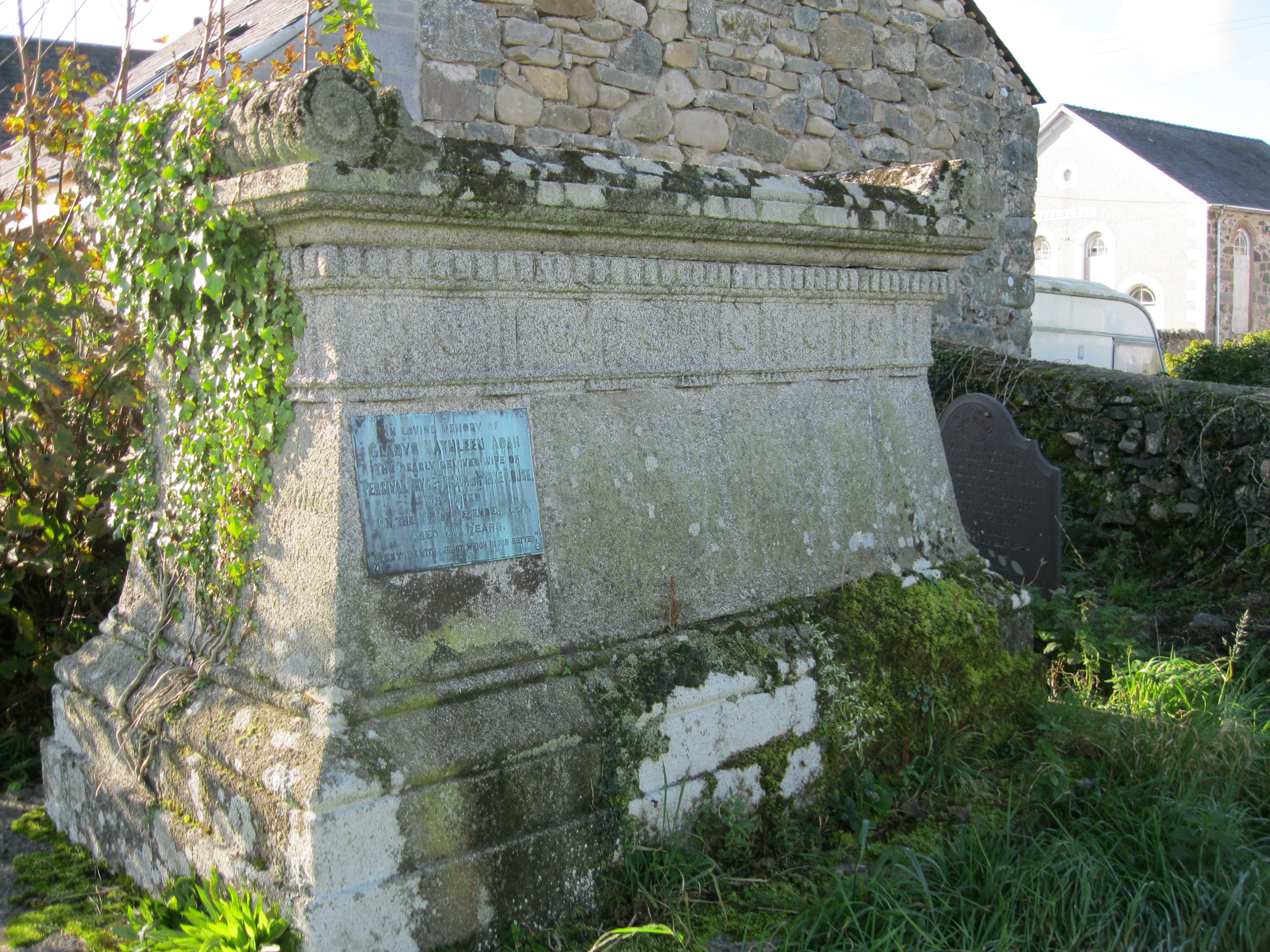
Picton-Jones Monument

== Sources ==
- Haslam, Richard; Orbach, Julian; Voelcker, Adam (2009). Gwynedd. The Buildings of Wales. New Haven, US and London: Yale University Press. ISBN 978-0-300-14169-6. OCLC 1023292902.
