= R. T. Kendall =

American evangelist (born 1935)

- Born: July 13, 1935 (age 91); Ashland, Kentucky
- Known for: Pastor at Westminster Chapel

Robert Tillman Kendall (born July 13, 1935) is a Christian writer, speaker, and teacher who was pastor at Westminster Chapel for 25 years. He is author of more than 50 books, including Total Forgiveness. Kendall was part of the Word, Spirit, Power team, a non-denominational charismatic ministry.

== Early life and family ==
Kendall was born July 13, 1935, in Ashland, Kentucky and named for R. T. Williams who was a general superintendent of the Church of the Nazarene. He married Louise Wallis of Sterling, Illinois on June 28, 1958. They had two children, Robert Tillman II (TR) and Melissa Louise. He received degrees at Trevecca Nazarene University in Nashville, Tennessee (A.B., 1970), the Southern Baptist Theological Seminary (M.Div., 1972) in Louisville, Kentucky and the University of Louisville (M.A., 1973) and a Doctor of Philosophy at Regent's Park College, a hall of the University of Oxford. He received a Doctor of Divinity from Trevecca Nazarene University (1988).

== Ministry ==
At Oxford, Kendall was pastor of Calvary Baptist Church (now Brackley Baptist Church) in Lower Heyford from 1974 to 1977 which mainly served USAF families based at RAF Upper Heyford and RAF Croughton. From February 1, 1977, to February 1, 2002, he was the Minister at Westminster Chapel in London.

Kendall maintains a view that later Calvinism departed from the teaching of John Calvin on the issues of assurance and the extent of the atonement. Kendall expounded his views in his thesis, The Nature of Saving Faith, from William Perkins (d. 1602) to the Westminster Assembly (1642–1649), and his 1981 work Calvin and English Calvinism to 1649. Kendall's views prompted a response by Paul Helm, who wrote Calvin and the Calvinists in 1982.

Kendall's 1983 publication of Once Saved, Always Saved on the nature of Christian perseverance prompted debate of antinomianism among chapel members and others.

His charismatic beliefs and affirmation of prophecies and association with Paul Cain and the Kansas City Prophets from the early 1990s were controversial.

In 2002, he was introduced by the Archbishop of Canterbury's Envoy to the Middle East to meet the Palestinian leader Yasser Arafat and discussed the Christian faith with him.

Kendall is retired but continues his work as an author and guest speaker at Christian conferences. He appears on Christian television and is a regular contributor to Christian publications. He is president of R.T. Kendall Ministries.

== Works ==
=== Books ===
Kendall is the author of more than 50 books including:

- Kendall, R. T. (1978). Jonah: an exposition: sermons preached at Westminster Chapel, London. London: Hodder & Stoughton. OCLC 926188342.
- ——— (1979). Calvin and English Calvinism to 1649. Oxford theological monographs. Oxford, England: Oxford University Press. ISBN 978-0-19826720-1. OCLC 7505253.
- ——— (1981). Believing God: studies on faith in Hebrews 11. Biblical classics library. Carlisle, ENG: Paternoster. ISBN 978-0-85364652-5. OCLC 33864909.
- ——— (1981). Who by Faith. London: Hodder & Stoughton. ISBN 978-0-34026362-4. OCLC 8980298.
- ——— (1982). Tithing: A Call to Serious, Biblical Giving. London; Grand Rapids, MI: Hodder & Stoughton; Zondervan. OCLC 281710994.
- ——— (1983). Once Saved Always Saved. Chicago, IL: Moody Press. ISBN 978-0-34034253-4. OCLC 12462060.
- ——— (1984). Stand up and be counted : calling for public confession of faith. London: Hodder & Stoughton. ISBN 978-0-34035175-8. OCLC 12694182.
- ——— (1986). Does Jesus Care?. London: Hodder & Stoughton. ISBN 978-0-34039974-3. OCLC 14133459.
- ——— (1988). Is God for the Homosexual?. Basingstoke: Marshall Pickering. ISBN 978-0-55101600-2. OCLC 17260947.
- ——— (1988). He Saves: How to Become – and Stay – a Christian. London: Hodder & Stoughton. ISBN 978-0-34041497-2. OCLC 904318083.
- ——— (1990). God Meant It for Good. Eastbourne: Kingsway. ISBN 978-0-86065411-7. OCLC 20723717.
- ——— (1990). The God of the Bible. Eastbourne: Kingsway. ISBN 978-0-86065808-5. OCLC 877330852.
- ——— (1992). Meekness and Majesty: Rediscovering Jesus. Fearn, Ross-shire: Christian Focus Publications. ISBN 978-1-87167687-7.
- ——— (1992). The Gift of Giving. London: Hodder & Stoughton. ISBN 978-0-34056891-0. OCLC 26358008. — republication of 'Tithing' from 1982
- ——— (1993). Before the Throne: A Comprehensive Guide to the Importance and Practice of Worship. Nashville, TN: Broadman & Holman Publishers.
- ——— (1994). Are You Stone Deaf to the Spirit or Re-discovering God?. Fearn, Ross-shire: Christian. Focus Publications.
- ——— (1995). Higher Ground: insights from the Psalms of Ascent (Psalms 120–134). Fearn, Ross-shire: Christian Focus Publications. ISBN 978-1-85792158-8. OCLC 34516090.
- ——— (1996). Understanding Theology. Vol. I: The Means of Developing a Healthy Church in the Twenty First Century. Fearn, Ross-shire: Christian Focus Publications. ISBN 978-1-85792429-9.
- ——— (1996). The Word and the Spirit: Reclaiming Your Covenant with the Holy Spirit and the Word of God. Eastbourne: Kingsway. ISBN 978-0-85476413-6. OCLC 59600293.
- ——— (1998). All's well that ends well: the life of Jacob. Carlisle: Paternoster Press. ISBN 978-0853-64862-8. OCLC 43031199.
- ——— (1998). Worshipping God: rediscovering the full dimension of worship. London: Hodder & Stoughton. ISBN 978-0-340-51486-3. OCLC 20417261.
- ——— (1998). When God Shows Up: staying ready for the unexpected. Carlisle, ENG: Paternoster Press. ISBN 978-0-83072340-9. OCLC 39692233.
- ——— (1999). The Anointing: Yesterday, Today, Tomorrow. Nashville, TN: Nelson.
- ——— (1999). The Thorn in the Flesh. London: Hodder & Stoughton. ISBN 978-0-34074546-5. OCLC 59408335.
- ——— (1999). A Vision of Jesus: The Awesome Jesus of Revelation. Fearn, Ross-shire: Christian Focus Publishers. ISBN 978-1-85792394-0. OCLC 44058287.
- ——— (2000). Great Christian Prayers: From the Rich History of Christian Faith – A Prayer for Every Day of the Year. London: Hodder & Stoughton. ISBN 978-0-34075609-6. OCLC 48238479.
- ——— (2000). Understanding Theology. Vol. II: The Means of Developing a Healthy Church in the Twenty First Century. Fearn, Ross-shire: Christian Focus Publications. ISBN 978-1-85792537-1.
- ——— (2000). Just Grace. London: S.P.C.K. ISBN 9780281052240. OCLC 43541962.
- ——— (2000). The Sensitivity of the Spirit: The Forgotten Anointing. London: Hodder & Stoughton. ISBN 978-0-34075628-7. OCLC 59458291.
- ——— (2001). A Man After God's Own Heart: God's Relationship with David — and with You. Fearn, Ross-shire: Christian Focus Publishers. ISBN 978-1-85792382-7. OCLC 47041873.
- ——— (2001). Understanding Theology. Vol. III: The Means of Developing a Healthy Church in the Twenty First Century. Fearn, Ross-shire: Christian Focus Publications. ISBN 978-1-85792581-4.
- ——— (2001). Justification By Works: How Works Vindicate True Faith. Sermons on James 1–3. Authentic Media. ISBN 978-0-85364903-8.
- ——— (2002). Total Forgiveness: Achieving God's Greatest Challenge. London: Hodder & Stoughton. ISBN 978-0-34075639-3.
- ——— (2002). In Pursuit of His Glory: My 25 Years at Westminster Chapel. London: Hodder & Stoughton. ISBN 978-0-34078602-4. OCLC 49739164.
- ——— (2002). The Way Of Wisdom: Patience In Waiting On God Sermons On James 4–5. Carlisle, England: Paternoster Press. ISBN 978-1-84227112-4. OCLC 51245104.
- ——— (2003). Between the times: Malachi, the last prophet before centuries of silence. Scotland: Christian Focus Publications. ISBN 978-1-85792792-4. OCLC 55007583.
- ——— (2003). Thanking God. London: Hodder & Stoughton. ISBN 978-0-34078707-6. OCLC 717506803.
- ——— (2004). Pure Joy. London: Hodder & Stoughton. ISBN 978-0-34086194-3. OCLC 53708943.
- ——— (2004). Tales of Total Forgiveness. London: Hodder & Stoughton. ISBN 978-0-34086327-5. OCLC 61128601.
- ——— (2004). The Judgment Seat of Christ: What Will God Say to You When You Die?. Fearn, Scotland: Christian Focus Publications. OCLC 59756606.
- ——— (2004). The Complete Guide to the Parables: Understanding and Applying the Stories of Jesus. Grand Rapids, MI: Chosen Books. ISBN 978-0-80079358-6. OCLC 1028739848.
- ——— (2005). Just Say Thanks!. Lake Mary, FL: Charisma House. ISBN 9781591856276. OCLC 59149292.
- {{2006 The Christian and the Pharisee: Two Outspoken Religious Leaders Debate the Road to Heaven, a collection of his conversations with David Rosen }}
- ——— (2006). Out of Your Comfort Zone: Your God Is Too Nice. New York: Warner Faith. ISBN 978-0-44669735-4. OCLC 62421122.
- ——— (2006). The Parables of Jesus. Grand Rapids, MI: Chosen Books. ISBN 978-0-80079458-3. OCLC 216937279. – republication of The Complete Guide to the Parables, 2004.
- ——— (2006). Your Words Have Power: controlling the tongue. London: Hodder & Stoughton. ISBN 978-0-34091017-7. OCLC 70764617.
- ——— (2007). How to Forgive Ourselves – Totally. Lake Mary, FL: Charisma House. ISBN 978-1-59979173-9. OCLC 80359209.
- ——— (2008). Did you think to pray?. London: Hodder & Stoughton. ISBN 978-0-34096409-5. OCLC 232712794.
- ——— (2008). The Unfailing Love of Jesus. Lake Mary, FL: Charisma House. ISBN 978-1-59979228-6. OCLC 185095636.
- ——— (2010). The Lord's Prayer. London: Hodder & Stoughton. ISBN 978-0-340964149. OCLC 751795474.
- ——— (2011). The Sermon on the Mount: a verse-by-verse look at the greatest teachings of Jesus. London: Monarch Books. ISBN 978-0-85721334-1. OCLC 828180664.
- ——— (2012). The Scandal of Christianity. London: Hodder & Stoughton. ISBN 978-0-34096416-3. OCLC 973694493.
- ——— (2012). Totally Forgiving God. London: Hodder & Stoughton. ISBN 978-0-34096417-0. OCLC 800853150.
- ———; Carrin, Charles; Taylor, Jack R. (2012). Word Spirit Power: what happens when you seek all God has to offer. Minneapolis, MN: Chosen Books. ISBN 978-0-80079526-9. OCLC 966556531.
- ——— (2012). Unashamed to Bear His Name. Minneapolis, MN: Chosen Books. ISBN 978-0-80079516-0. OCLC 729346752.
- ——— (2011). Why Jesus Died. Oxford: Monarch. ISBN 978-0-85721061-6. OCLC 753307528.
- ——— (2013). These are the Days of Elijah: How God Uses Ordinary People to Do Extraordinary Things. Minneapolis, MN: Chosen Books. ISBN 978-0-80079537-5. OCLC 795759432.
- ——— (2014). Holy Fire. Lake Mary, FL: Charisma House. ISBN 978-1-62136604-1. OCLC 862221999.
- ——— (2016). Prepare Your Heart for the Midnight Cry. London: S.P.C.K. ISBN 978-0-28107772-4.

=== Articles and Chapters ===
- ——— (1991). Porter, David (ed.). Grace and Glory: Keswick Ministry. Oxford: OM Publishing. ISBN 978-1-85078100-4.
