= Ellis Owen Ellis =

Welsh portrait painter, cartoonist and illustrator

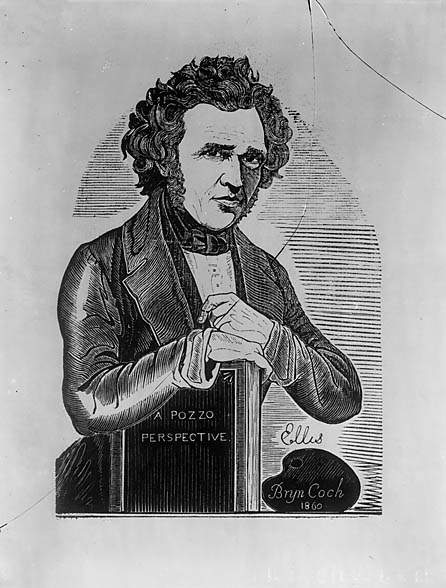
Self-Portrait, c. 1860, Ellis Owen Ellis, Print, 21.5 x 12 cm. This print was originally published alongside the artist's biography in Y Pwnch Cymraeg, 9th June, 1860.

Ellis Owen Ellis (1813-1861) also known as Ellis Bryn-coch, was a Welsh portrait painter, cartoonist and illustrator. His subject-matter was wholly Welsh and encompassed satires and cartoons printed in Welsh language periodicals as well as book illustrations.

== Early life ==
Ellis Owen Ellis was born in Abererch, Caernarvonshire, to the daughter of John Roberts (Sion Lleyn). When he was a young man, Ellis was apprenticed to a carpenter but showed some promise as an artist, possibly in the capacity of a sign painter or in a coach building business. He came to the attention of the Welsh landowner and politician, Baronet Sir Robert Williames Vaughan. Vaughan introduced Ellis to the influential portrait painter Sir Martin Archer Shee, who later became President of the Royal Academy and a Fellow of the Royal Society. In 1834 Ellis went to London to study painting, furnished with letters of introduction to other artists given him by Shee.

According to T.R. Roberts, Ellis studied in the London Galleries that year and soon after his paintings were displayed at Exeter Hall and Westminster. According to the author, his Fall of Llewelyn, the last Prince of Wales and The Battle of Morfa Rhuddlan were 'exceptionally well received'. There is little concrete evidence determining Ellis's movements after 1834, but it is likely that he spent some time in Liverpool before moving to his home in Bryncoch near Pwllheli. Certainly, he was still in Liverpool in September 1855 when he was ‘engaged in the ancient artisan tradition of ‘preparing Illustrations and Armorial Flags and Figures for the Liverpool Corporation’. A biography of Ellis Own Ellis' life published in the 9th June 1860 in Y Pwynch Cymraeg, (a Welsh-language equivalent of the English satirical magazine Punch), asserts that Ellis was 23 years old when he settled in Liverpool and worked for Alexander Moses.

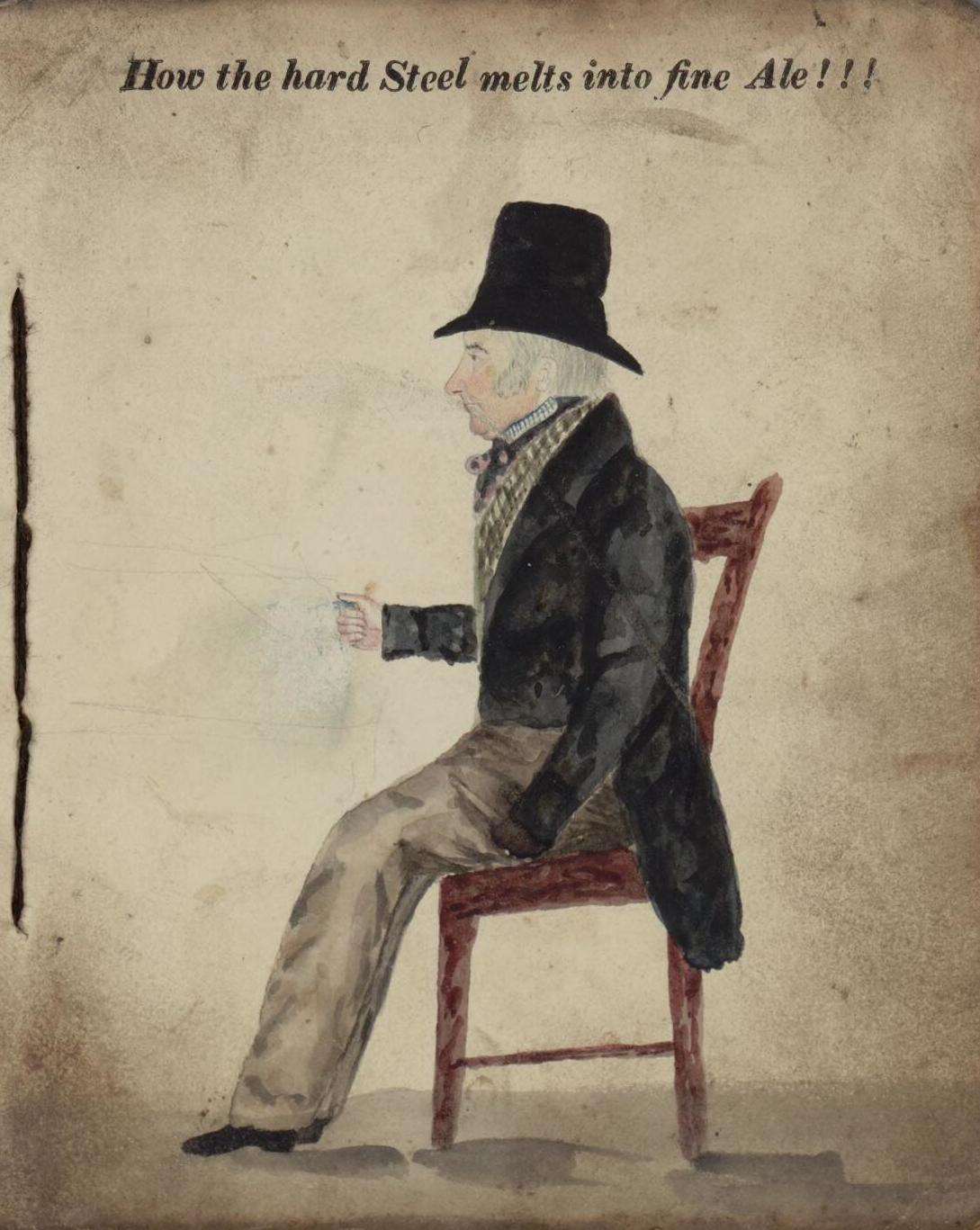
Ellis Owen Ellis, Morris Hughes, watercolour, c. 1830

== Portrait paintings ==
Ellis Owen Ellis belonged to the tradition of the Welsh artisan portrait painter. Itinerant, self-taught portrait-painters such as Ellis and his friends, William Roos and Hugh Hughes found success in the first half of the nineteenth century in Wales and England, at a time before the widespread use of studio portrait photography. This was largely due to the growth of an increasingly prosperous middle-class market who wanted, like the nobility, to own portrait likenesses of themselves. Ellis Owen Ellis' portrait of Morris Hughes as well as his pendant portrait image of the young girl beneath it, is a good example of his spare, comic style.

One of Ellis' best-known works was his historical group portrait known as Oriel y Beirdd ('Gallery of Poets', c. 1855), depicting a group of 100 Welsh men-of-letters. This carefully rendered work is indicative of Ellis' familiarity with the Welsh cultural elite of his day. Indeed, according to Peter Lord, Ellis’ home was a meeting-place for Welsh intellectuals such as Ceiriog, Llyfrbryf, Idris Fychan and Robin Ddu.

== Book Illustration ==
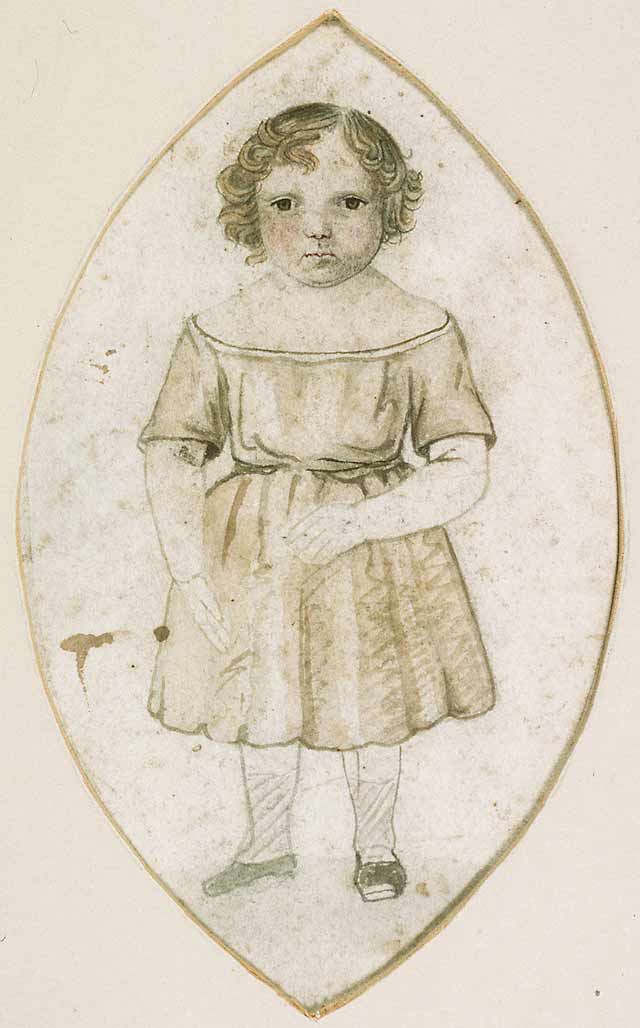
Ellis Owen Ellis, c. 1846, pencil and wash study, 18.0 x 11.0 cm

Ellis was deeply interested in the relationship between text and image. He illustrated a number of books and some of his best-known portraits were of Welsh poets, such as the engraved portrait of John Thomas, Y Bardd yn ei Wely ('The Poet in his Bed', 1861). Two of Ellis's most significant illustration projects include seven drawings of the bawdy Welsh ballad Betty of Llansaintffraid and his illustrations for the Life and Times of Richard Robert Jones (also known as Dic Aberdaron), shown in the gallery below. Dic of Aberdaron, like Ellis, was a somewhat mysterious figure; a self-taught polymath and linguist who also lived for a time in Liverpool.

The art historian Paul Joyner points out the 'consistent innovations' found in Ellis' drawing. He describes the Life and Times of Richard Robert Jones as 'a Welsh Odyssey' and points out his use of a classical, 'Flaxmanesque, style of outline drawing'. Arguably, Ellis' style recalls John Flaxman's illustrations to Homer as well as Sandro Botticelli's illustrations of Dante's Divine Comedy. Such a range of references leads to an unexpected synthesis in Ellis' work between rustic Welsh subject matter and classical erudition, obviously the product of a good arts education despite the artist's humble background. The tone of this work, like many cartoons and drawings by Ellis, is rather difficult to pin-point. It is light and satirical rather than serious, and potentially contains layers of in-jokes between the artist and his subject. Ellis also began work on a number of blocks to illustrate a picaresque fiction in pamphlet form about the highway man Dick Turpin published by John Jones.

== Later life ==
Ellis continued to create satirical woodcut cartoons for Y Punch Cymraeg for three years between 1858 and 1860, before his death in 1861.

== Gallery ==
A series of drawings from The Illustrated Life of Richard Robert Jones produced by Ellis in 1844.

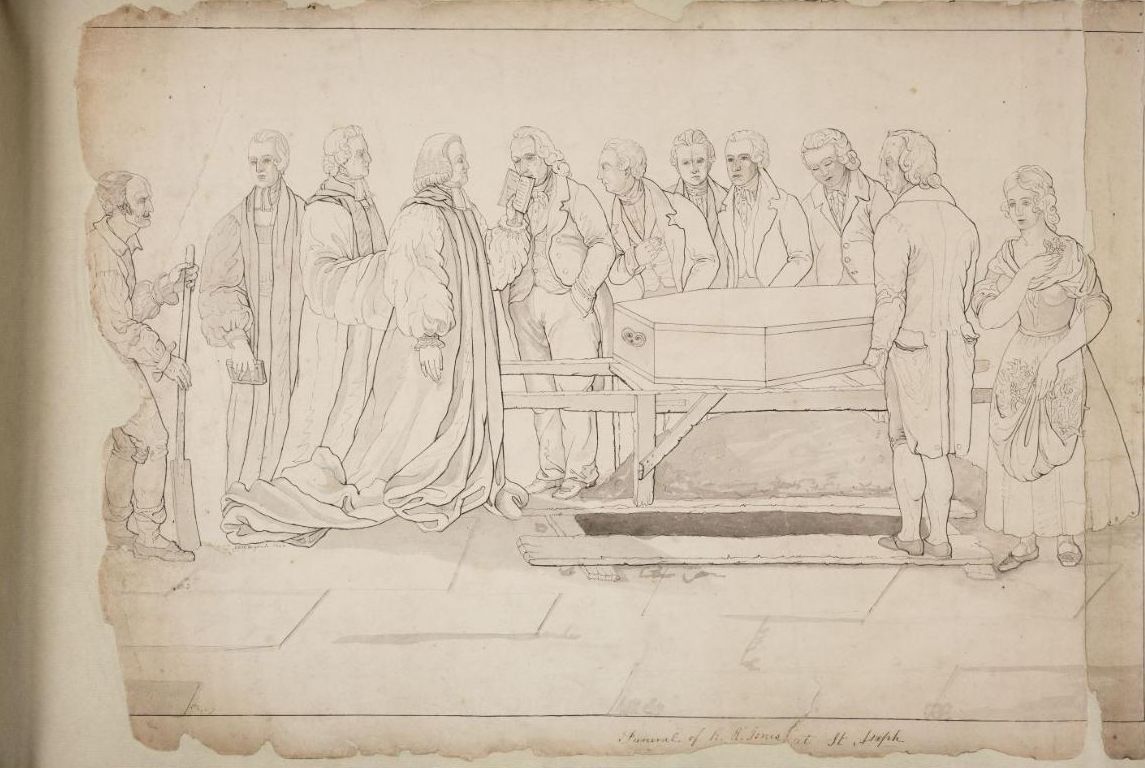
Funeral of R.R. Jones at St Asaph, Ellis Owen Ellis, drawing, 34 x 48 cm, from the "Illustrated life of Richard Robert Jones"

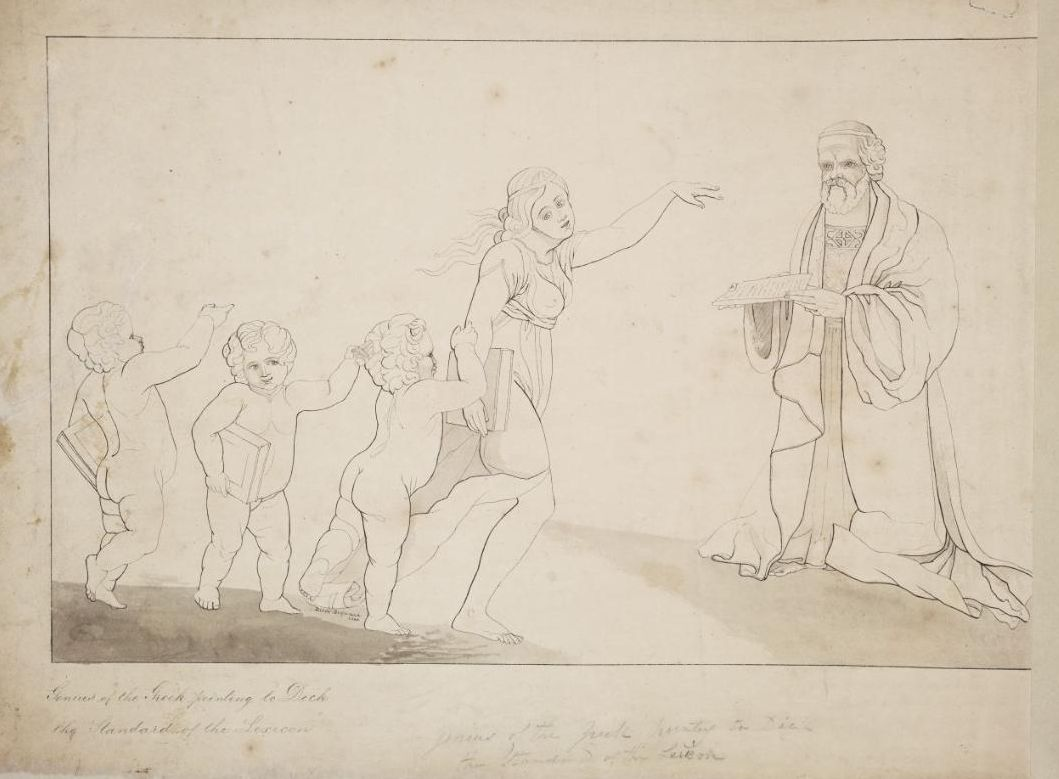
'Genius of the Greek pointing to Dick the standard of the Lexicon', drawing, 1844, from the Illustrated life of Richard Robert Jones

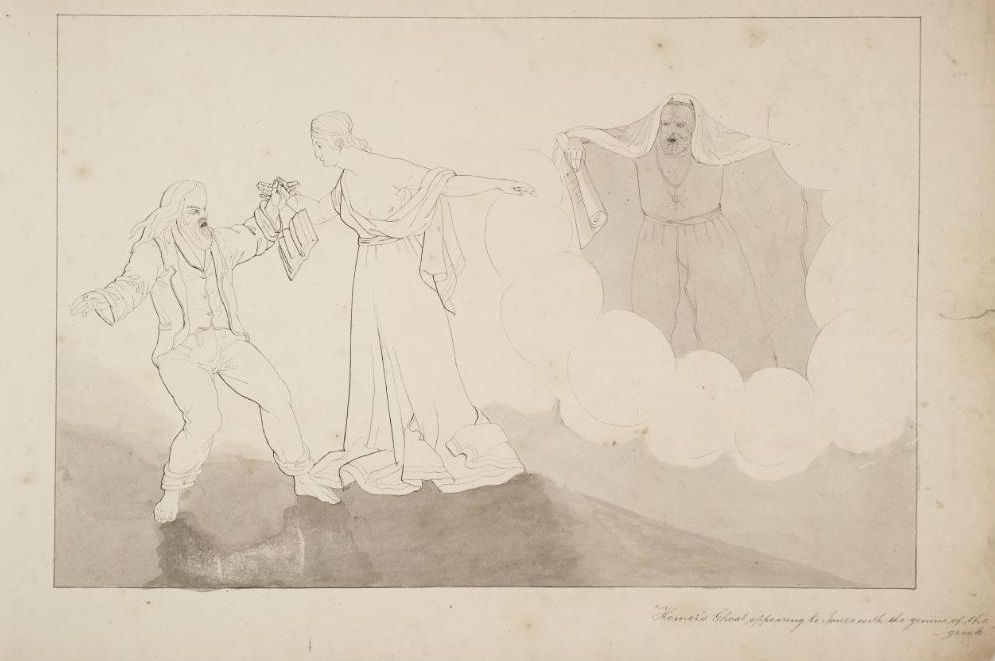
'Homer's ghost appearing to Jones with the genius of the greek', 1844, drawing, 34 x 48 cm, from the Illustrated life of Richard Robert Jones

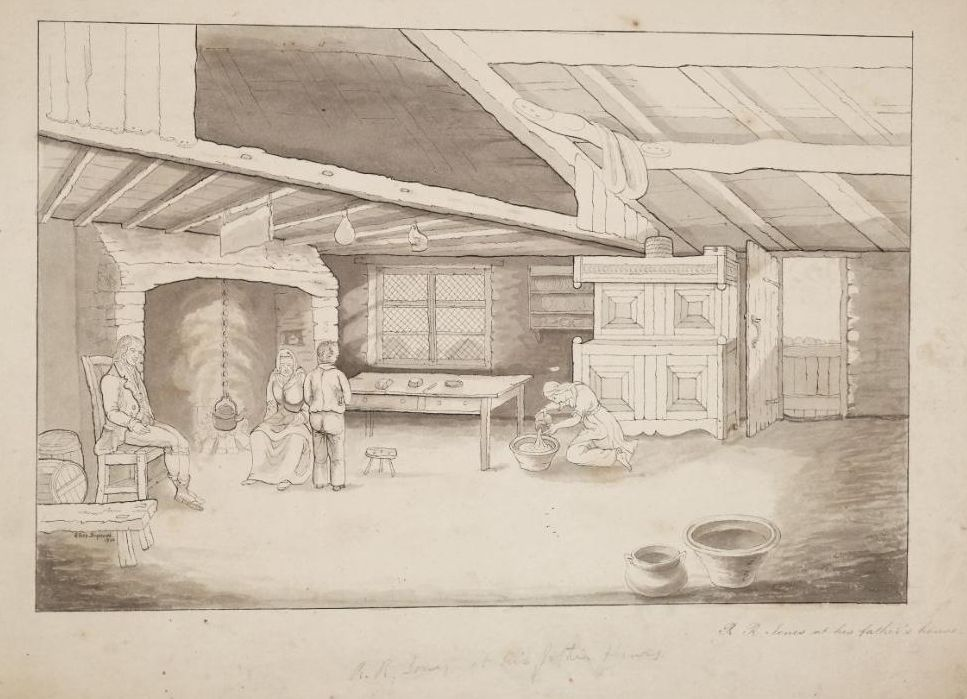
'R.R. Jones at his fathers house', 1844, drawing, 34 x 48 cm, from the Illustrated life of Richard Robert Jones

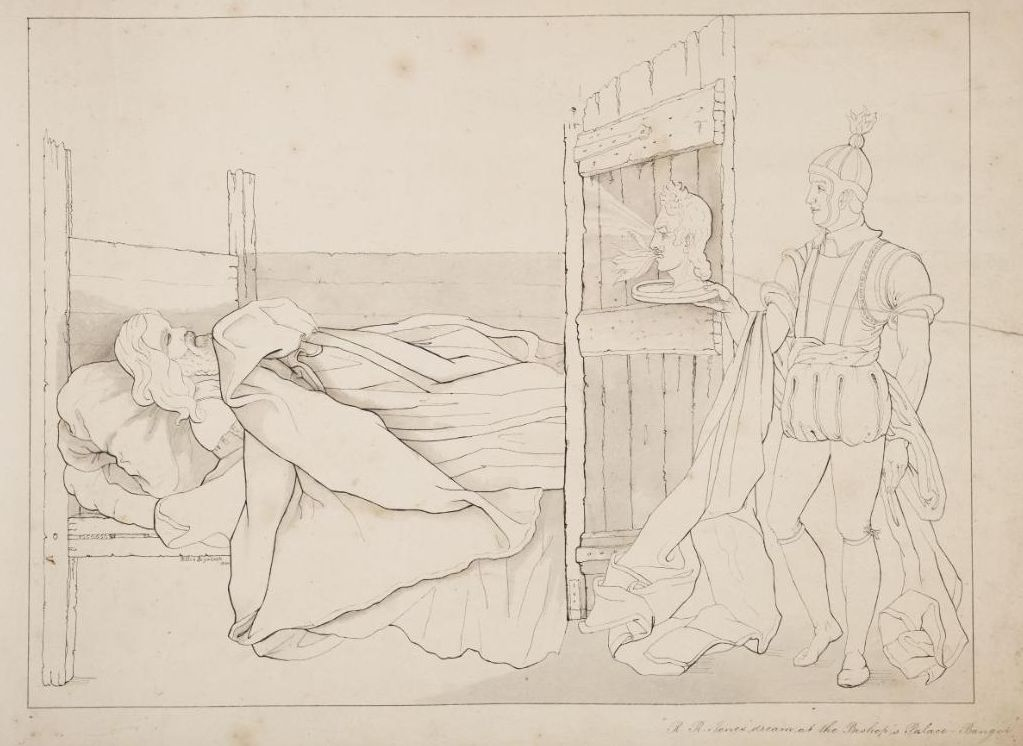
'R.R. Jones dream at the Bishop's Palace - Bangor', 1844, drawing, 34 x 48 cm, from the Illustrated life of Richard Robert Jones

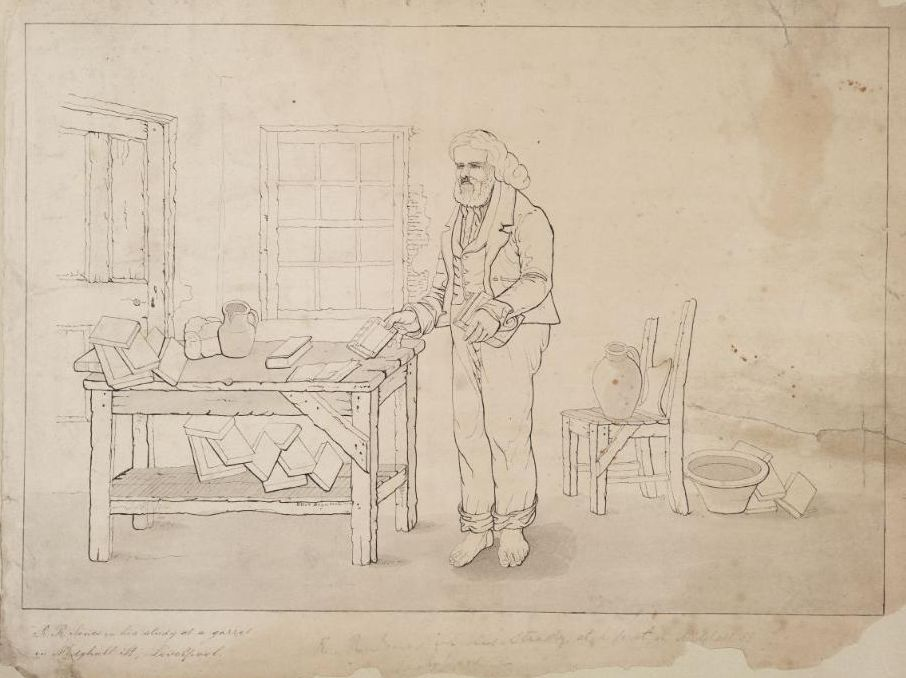
'R.R. Jones in his study at a gazzet in Midghall St, Liverpool', 1844, drawing, 34 x 48 cm, from The Illustrated Life of Richard Robert Jones

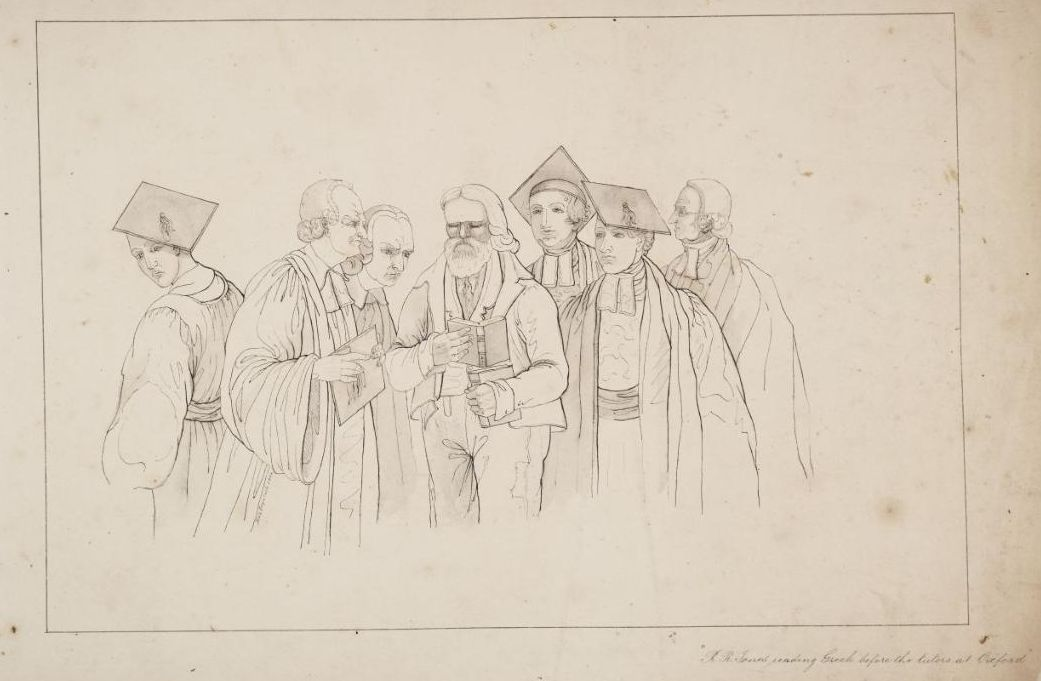
'R.R. Jones reading Greek before the tutors at Oxford', 1844, drawing, 34 x 48 cm, from The Illustrated Life of Richard Robert Jones.

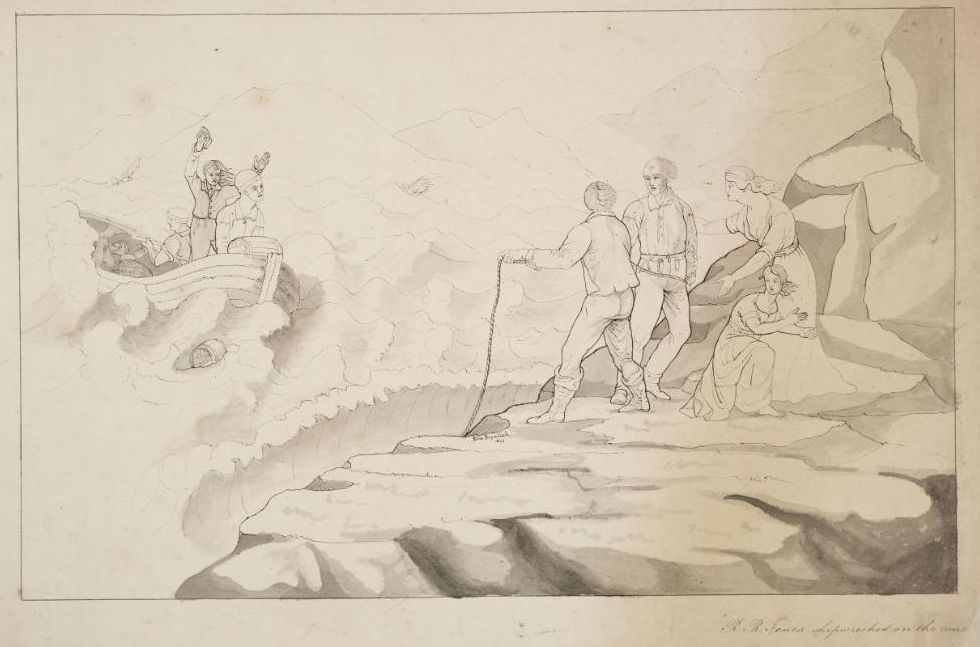
'R.R. Jones shipwrecked on the coast', 1844, drawing, 34 x 48 cm, from The Illustrated Life of Richard Robert Jones

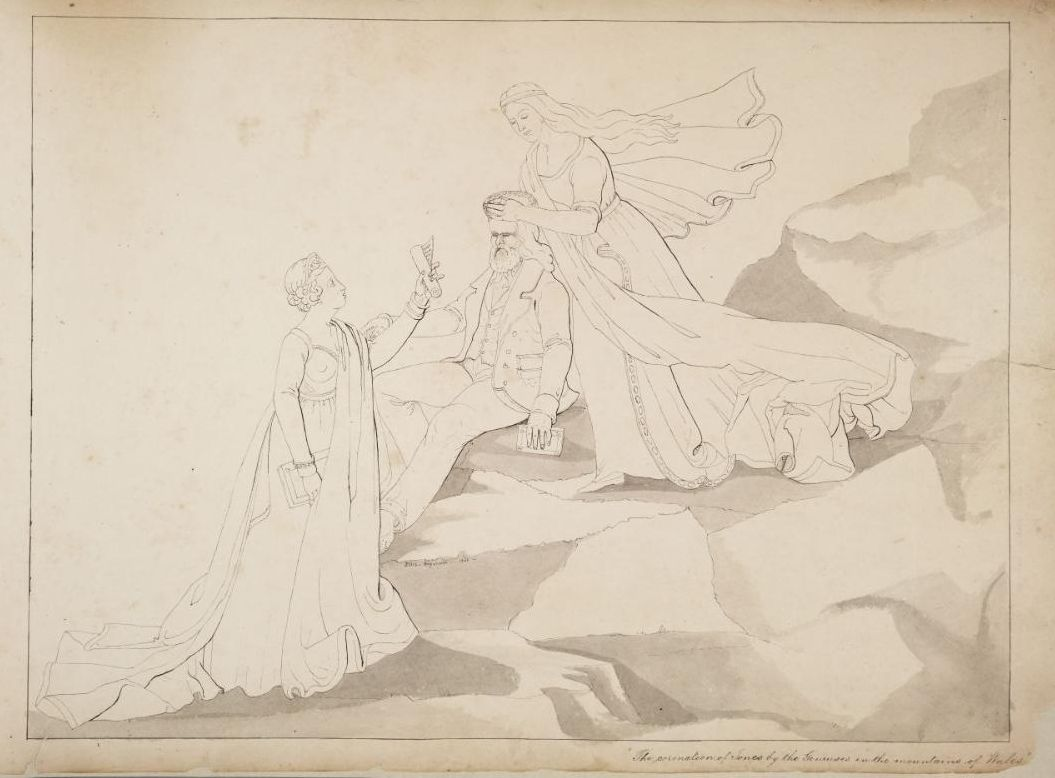
'The Coronation of Jones by the Geniuses in the Mountains of Wales', 1844, drawing, 34 x 48 cm, from The Illustrated Life of Richard Robert Jones

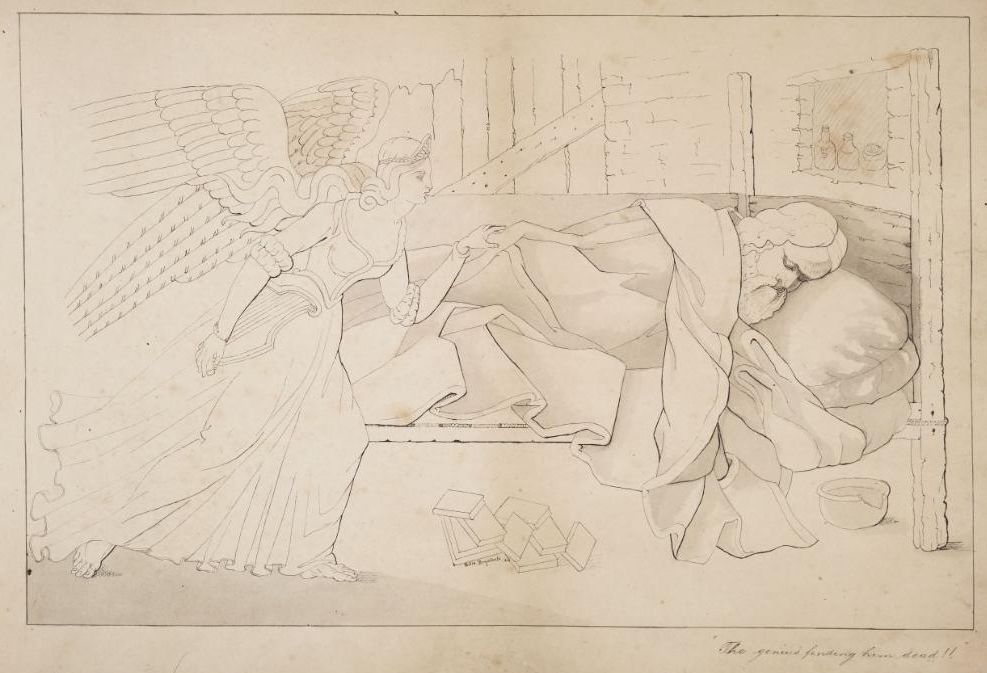
'The Genius Finding him Dead', 1844, drawing, 34 x 48 cm, from The Illustrated Life of Richard Robert Jones.

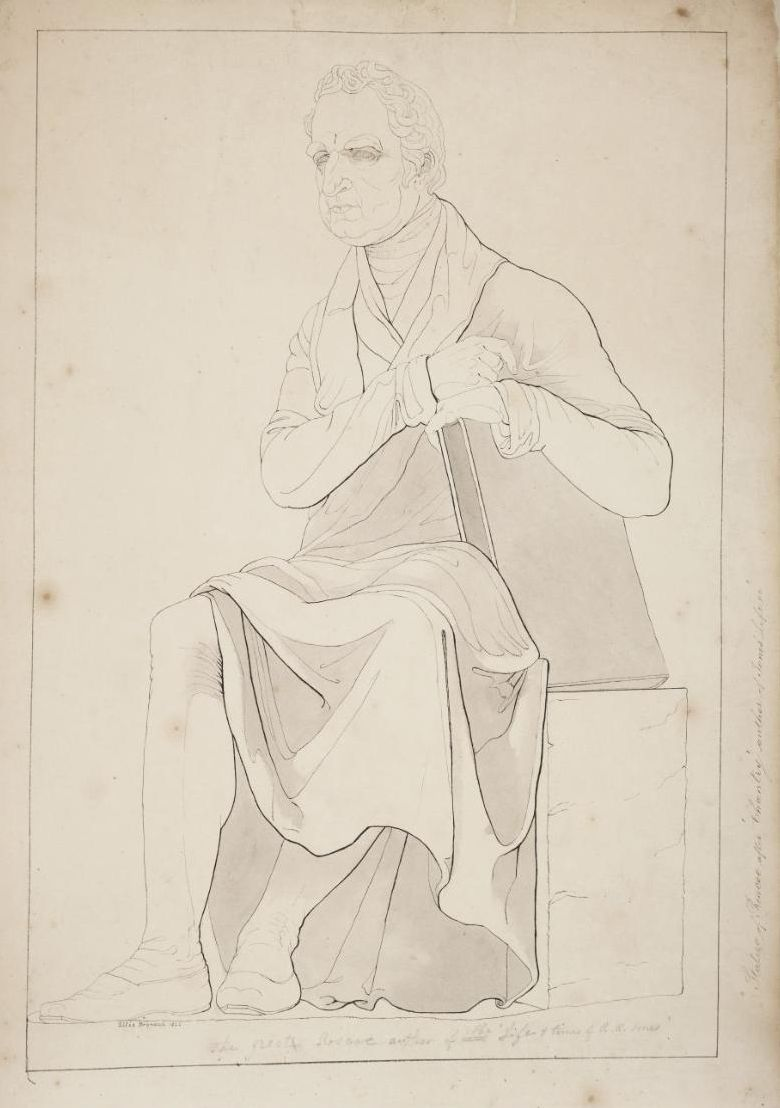
'The Great Roscoe', 1844, drawing, 34 x 48 cm from the Illustrated Life of Richard Robert Jones

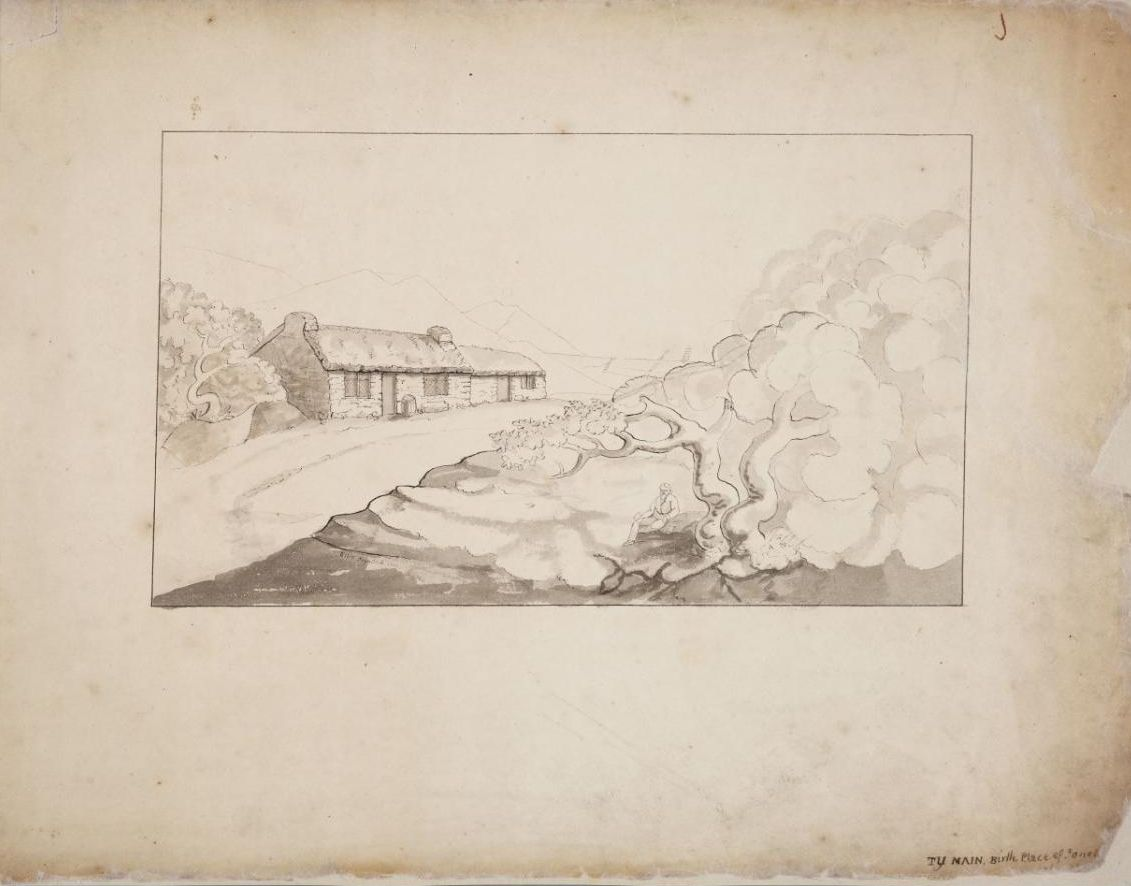
'Ty Main, Birth-place of Jones', 1844, drawing, from the Illustrated Life of Richard Robert Jones
