= Lachlan Mackenzie =

Church of Scotland minister

Rev Lachlan Mackenzie (1754-1819) was a Church of Scotland minister in Lochcarron, a village in the Wester Ross area of the Highlands of Scotland.

== Life ==
He was born in Knockbain in 1754, to Donald and Elizabeth Mackenzie.

He was a central figure in the revival of evangelical Christianity in the Scottish Highlands in the late 18th century, whose influence continued through the 19th into the 20th century.

Known as "Mr Lachlan" he was "a man of undissembled piety, great integrity, and remarkable for his zeal, sacred eloquence, and usefulness."

As the parish minister, he submitted an Account of the Parish of Lochcarron to Sir John Sinclair of Ulbster's Old (or First) Statistical Account of Scotland, published between 1791 and 1799. He appended a poem created for the occasion, Statistical Account of Lochcarron, which Sir John read to the House of Commons. He produced a number of notable poems.

There are many anecdotes associated with his ministry, including a notable sermon on "Behold, I stand at the door and knock" Rev 3:20 preached in the Old Parish Church of St Nicholas, Aberdeen.

He died in June 1819.

== Publications ==
- The Happy Man
- The Christian's Firm Bank
- Statistical Account of Lochcarron
- Heaven
