= Westminster Chapel =

Coordinates: 51.4988°N 0.1382°W

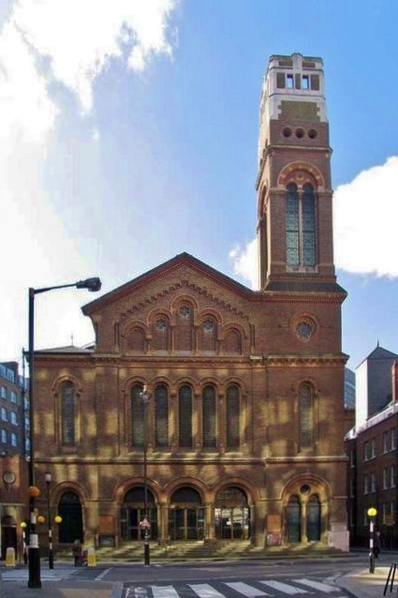
- The front of Westminster Chapel seen from Petty France
- Westminster Chapel
- OS grid reference: TQ 29329 79407
- Location: Westminster
- Country: England
- Denomination: Evangelical free church, affiliated to EFCC, FIEC & Newfrontiers
- Previous denomination: Congregational Union
- Tradition: Congregational
- Website: westminsterchapel.org.uk

History
- Founded: 1840
- Founder: Samuel Martin

Architecture
- Heritage designation: Grade II
- Architect: William Ford Poulton
- Style: Lombard Romanesque Revival
- Years built: 1864–65
- Completed: 1865

Specifications
- Capacity: 1,500
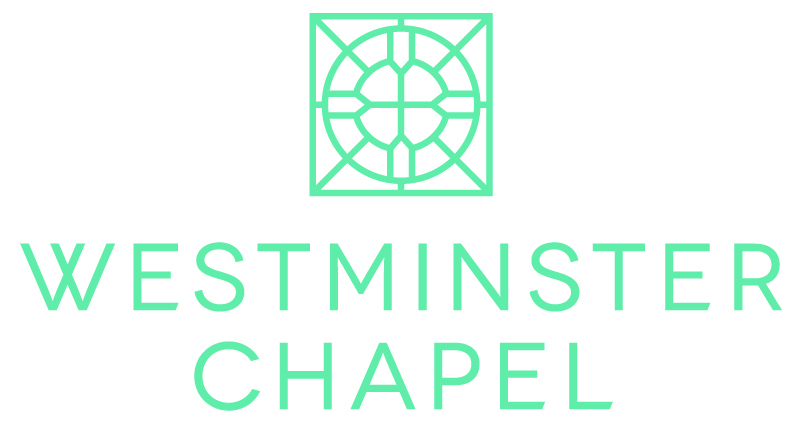
- "Bringing the Kingdom of God to the Heart of the Nation"

Westminster Chapel is an evangelical free church in Westminster, central London. The church is in Buckingham Gate, on the corner of Castle Lane and opposite the junction with Petty France. Buckingham Gate is just off Victoria Street and near Buckingham Palace.

The church has had several notable pastors including the Revd Samuel Martin (1842–78), G. Campbell Morgan (1904–17, 1933–43), John Henry Jowett (1918–22), Martyn Lloyd-Jones (1939–68), R. T. Kendall (1977–2002) and Greg Haslam (2002–16).

== History ==
The congregation was formed in 1840 and its original chapel building was completed in Buckingham Gate in 1841. The congregation outgrew that building, so construction of a new chapel was begun in 1864. This building is the present chapel. It opened on 6 July 1865 and had capacity to seat about 1,500 people, now reduced to about 1,000.

Westminster Chapel has had five particularly well-known pastors: the Revd Samuel Martin (1842–78), G. Campbell Morgan (1904–17, 1933–43), John Henry Jowett (1918–22), Martyn Lloyd-Jones (1939–68), R. T. Kendall (1977–2002) and Greg Haslam (2002–16).

The chapel was founded as a Congregational church, but during the pastorate of David Martyn Lloyd-Jones (1939–68) the church left the Congregational Union and joined the Evangelical Fellowship of Congregational Churches (founded 1967) and the Fellowship of Independent Evangelical Churches.

Prominent among the past deacons at Westminster Chapel have been Sir Fred Catherwood (1925–2014; son-in-law to Lloyd-Jones) and MJ "Monty" Micklewright (1897–1994).

The reformed theologian John Murray also delivered a notable lecture here titled "The Heavenly, Priestly Activity of Christ" in 1958.

During R. T. Kendall's pastorate, he led the church to adopt many emphases and practices of the Charismatic movement, despite the concerns of other church officers that these were contrary to the church's accepted reformed teachings. The following pastor, Greg Haslam, was previously the pastor of Winchester Family Church, a Newfrontiers church, and continued this trend, introducing many of Newfrontiers' core values to the church.

In addition to the activities of the chapel's own worshipping community, the chapel is well known as a host venue for many Christian conferences and assemblies including, in the past, as a venue for the "May Meetings" of the Congregational Union of England and Wales.

== Activities ==
=== Sundays ===
The church is evangelical in its beliefs. Services include worship, opportunities for prophecies, and a biblical sermon.

Westminster Chapel aims to be a prophetic voice to London, the UK and the nations. It recently issued a "Mission, Vision, Values" brochure, stating that the church would be Spirit-led, prophetic, and be increasingly mission-minded. The church aims to be a family and open to all who may want to visit. Sunday services are at 11 am.

=== Life Groups ===
Groups called Life Groups meet in homes throughout London, usually on Tuesday and Wednesday nights. These include special groups for students. The church's website states that these are "the hub of friendship, discipleship and evangelism" at the chapel.

=== Alpha course ===
Westminster Chapel hosts a free Alpha course twice a year. Alpha is an opportunity to explore the meaning of life over dinner, and the chapel's course usually runs on a Monday night.

=== Westminster Foodbank ===
Westminster Chapel currently runs the Westminster Foodbank, as part of the Trussell Trust network of food banks.

=== Student work ===
About 70 students and people in their twenties currently attend the chapel, and the church has a dedicated team who minister to this age group. There are events specifically aimed at students and twenties, as well as those that cater to the wider church family with which students can join in.

Twice a year the chapel hosts a retreat for students and twenties.

== Pastors ==
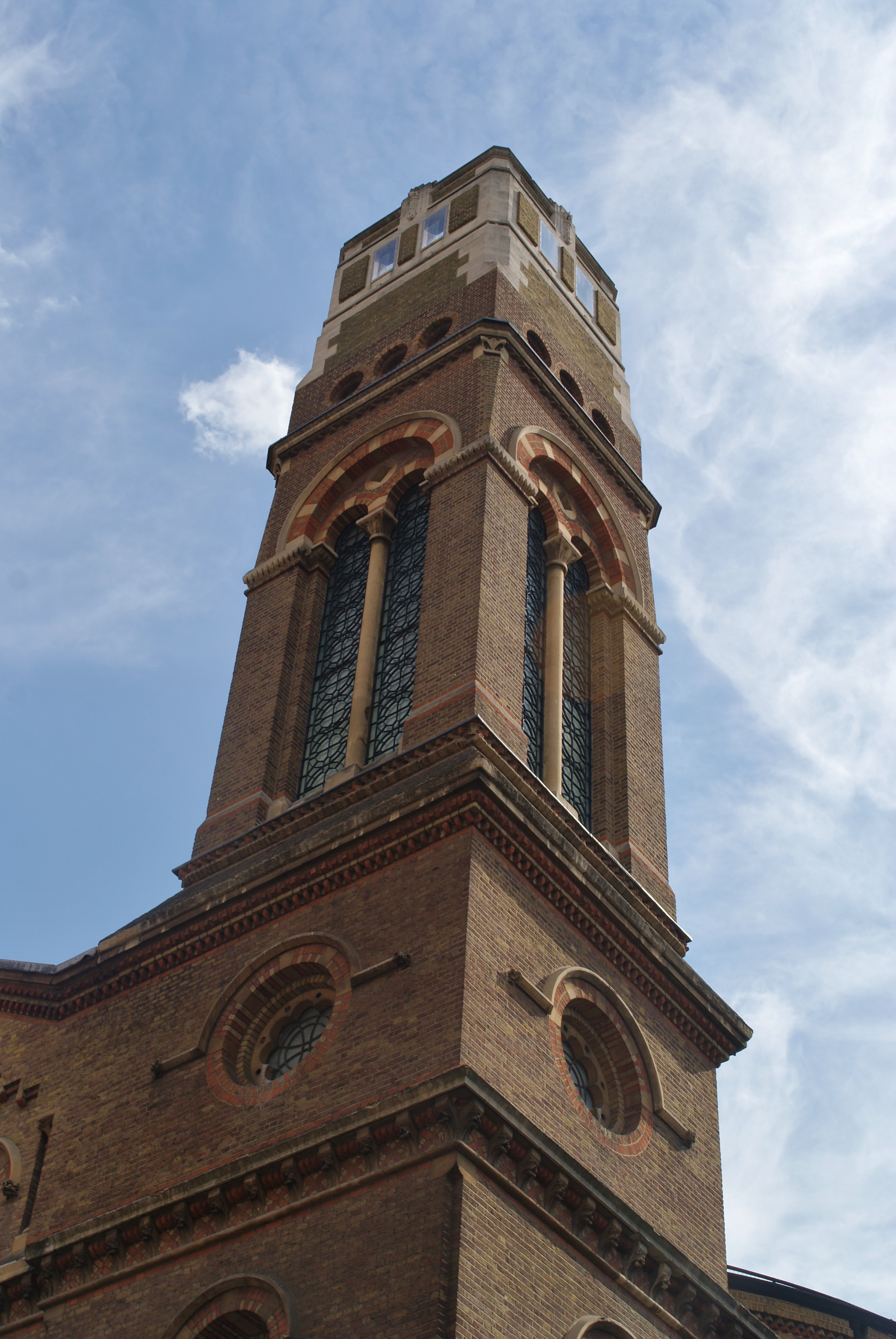
The tower on the corner of Buckingham Gate and Castle Lane

In August 2016, the church announced that an eldership team would be appointed, and Howard Satterthwaite would be appointed as Lead Elder.

The full list of previous pastors is:

- 1842–78 Revd Samuel Martin (helped by Henry Simon for the last two years of his pastorate)
- 1876–87 Revd Henry Simon
- 1887–94 no settled ministry
- 1894–95 Revd W. Evans Hurndall
- 1896–1902 Revd Richard Westrope
- 1902–04 no settled ministry
- 1904–17 Revd G. Campbell Morgan
- 1904–07 Revd Albert Swift (co-pastor with Campbell Morgan)
- 1918–22 Revd John Henry Jowett
- 1923–25 Revd John Hutton
- 1926–27 no settled ministry
- 1928–33 Revd Hubert Simpson
- 1933–43 Revd G. Campbell Morgan (associate minister for one year with Hubert Simpson)
- 1939–68 Revd D. Martyn Lloyd-Jones (associate minister with Campbell Morgan until August 1943)
- 1969–74 Revd J. Glyn Owen
- 1974–76 no settled ministry
- 1977–2002 Revd R. T. Kendall
- 2002–16 Revd Greg Haslam
- 2016-23 Revd Howard Satterthwaite

== Architecture ==
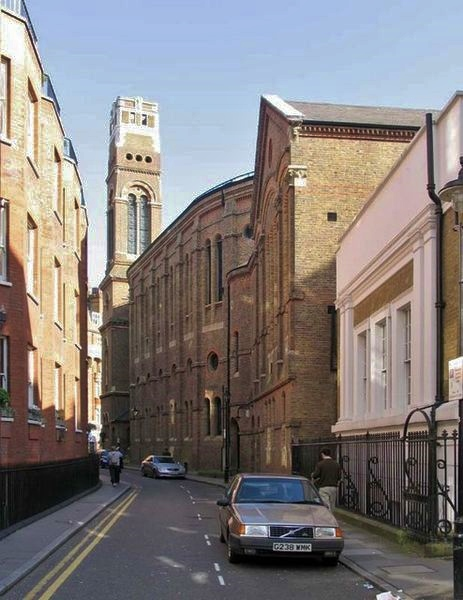
The chapel seen from Castle Lane

The present chapel, completed in 1865, was designed by the architect William Ford Poulton (1822–1901) of Reading, Berkshire, in a Lombard Romanesque Revival style. It is built of stock brick with some red brick and stone dressings. The façade on Buckingham Gate is gabled and has a recessed triple-arched central porch, with graduated arcading above, all having decorative shafting. There is a tower to the right, with coupled arched windows. The top stage of the tower was added in the 20th century in a different style and colour.

The auditorium, with seating capacity of about 1,500, is nearly oval, with two tiers of galleries and large open roof span. The galleries too are nearly oval, except that the 'circle' of the upper gallery is incomplete so as to accommodate the pipe organ. There is a high platform or daïs toward the front of the chapel, accommodating the Communion Table and chairs for the presiding minister and the serving deacons. This platform or daïs is about three feet above the floor level. Beyond this is a large (and even higher) platform or daïs, forming a very large preaching-station or pulpit. This feature is circular and surmounted by a balustrade. It may perhaps be one of the largest pulpits in any church building.

The chapel is a Grade II Listed building.

== Pipe organ ==
A four-manual pipe organ was built by the eminent organ-builder Henry Willis (1821–1901; often known as "Father Willis") and restored and enlarged in the 1920s by Messrs Rushworth and Draper.
