= Banner of Truth Trust =

Christian book publisher

- Status: Active
- Founded: 1957
- Founder: Iain Murray, Jack Cullum, Sidney Norton
- Country of origin: United Kingdom
- Headquarters location: Edinburgh, Scotland; Carlisle, Pennsylvania, U.S.
- Distribution: Worldwide
- Publication types: Books, magazine
- Nonfiction topics: Theology
- Official website: www.banneroftruth.org

The Banner of Truth Trust is an Evangelical and Reformed non-profit publishing house, structured as a charitable trust and founded in London in 1957 by Iain Murray, Sidney Norton and Jack Cullum. Its offices are now in Edinburgh, Scotland with a key branch office and distribution point in Carlisle, Pennsylvania. It positions itself within the conservative evangelical wing of the church, and has been described as "an extremely powerful organization within British nonconformist evangelicalism."

The trust publishes a monthly magazine called The Banner of Truth (ISSN 0408-4748) which normally appears eleven times per year, with there being a single issue for August and September. The magazine first appeared in September 1955 and as of December 2010 had reached issue number 566.

The Banner of Truth Trust also holds conferences in three countries: UK (annual youth conference and annual ministers' conference), United States (annual conference), and Australia (every two years).

The trust has been connected with the revival of interest in evangelical Calvinism in 20th century England. It has promoted Puritan theology and helped resurrect the ideas of Jonathan Edwards. Alister McGrath refers to the "revival in Puritan spirituality that had been borne aloft on the wings of Banner of Truth's inexpensive paperbacks."

The Banner of Truth Trust's logo depicts George Whitefield preaching.
