= Free grace theology =

Christian soteriological view

Free Grace theology is a Christian soteriological view which holds that the only condition of salvation is faith, excluding good works and perseverance, holding to eternal security. Free Grace advocates believe that good works are not necessary to earn (as with Pelagianism), to maintain (as with Arminians) or to prove (as with most Calvinists) salvation, but rather are part of discipleship and the basis for receiving eternal rewards (unlike in Hyper-Grace). This soteriological view distinguishes between salvation and discipleship – the call to believe in Christ as Savior and to receive the gift of eternal life, and the call to follow Christ and become an obedient disciple, respectively. Free Grace theologians emphasize the absolute freeness of salvation and the possibility of full assurance that is not grounded upon personal performance. Thus, Free Grace theology allows for the salvation of an individual despite moral failings, although the disobedient Christian will face divine discipline. Norman Geisler has divided this view into a moderate form and a more radical form. The moderate form being associated with Charles Ryrie and the strong form with Zane Hodges.

The modern form of Free Grace theology has its roots in the soteriology of formulated by many classical dispensationalist theologians, though not being necessarily tied to dispensationalism. This form of soteriology was coined with the name "free grace" by Zane Hodges. Free Grace views of salvation have been mainly taught among Southern Baptists, Independent Baptists, Plymouth Brethren, Calvary Chapel churches, non-denominational churches, churches affiliated with Florida Bible College, Bible churches, local churches influenced by Watchman Nee, churches influenced by R. B. Thieme, Greater Grace churches, the IFCA, and other independent churches. Similar views were in the past were also held in some form by the extinct Sandemanian churches alongside some old Scotch Baptists.

== History ==
=== Early Church (4th–6th centuries) ===
According to Ken Wilson, Augustine of Hippo criticized unnamed individuals who held to the view that one is saved by faith alone and that God's future judgement for Christians only consisted of temporal punishment and reward; Hell was out of question. Thus, they held that deeds such as turning from sin and doing good works were not necessary to enter Heaven.

Jody Dillow quoted the 6th-century writer Pseudo-Chrysostom as holding the view held by some Free Grace theologians that the one who does not obey will be in the kingdom but not "reign" with Christ.

=== Background (18th–20th centuries) ===
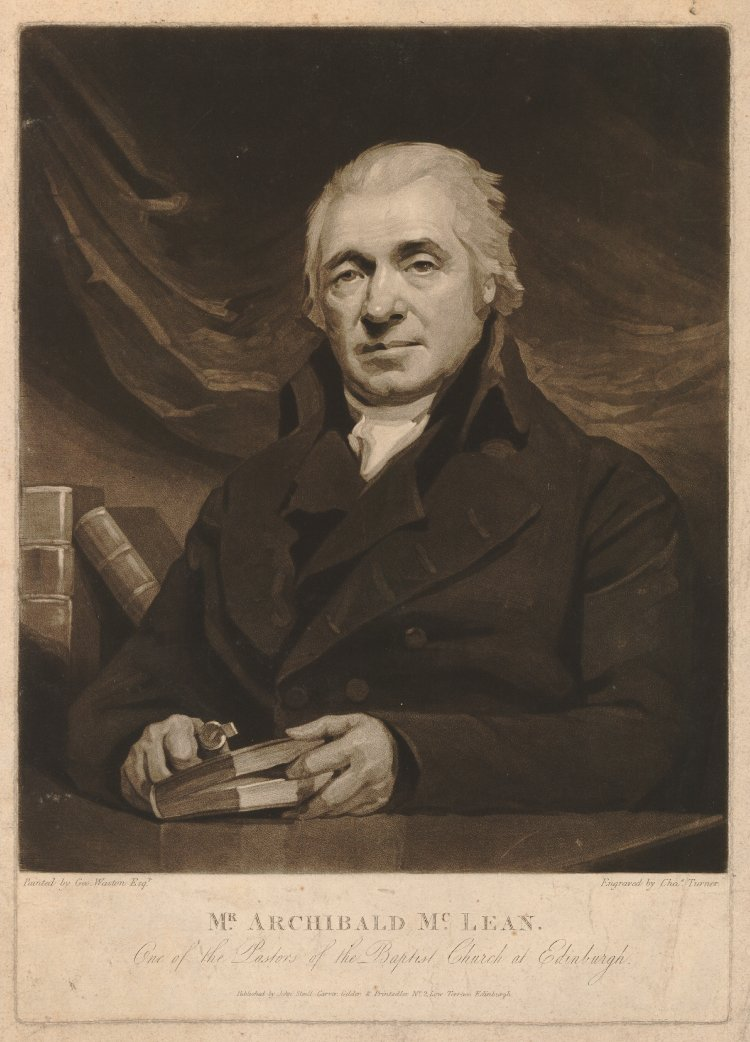
Archibald McLean

Although the modern Free Grace movement does not directly descend from Glasite churches, the doctrines of Sandemanianism concerning salvation, which were popularized by the non-conformist Robert Sandeman (1718–1771) and the Baptist preacher Archibald McLean (1733–1812) have been compared to some segments of the Free Grace movement, particularly in the controversy between Andrew Fuller (1754–1815) and McLean. This is largely due to the Sandemanian denial that commitment or affections were a necessary part of faith, which Andrew Fuller rejected by arguing that faith must involve commitment to Christ, viewing Sandemanianism as antinomian. Some similar views to Free Grace theology were also held by some early Keswick influenced writers in their strong distinction between salvation and sanctification, including writers such as D. L. Moody (1837–1899), who allowed truly saved people to experience carnal lives. Nonetheless, the views of these Keswick authors did not fully align with modern Free Grace theology, as they still retained several distinct theological differences. Even so, Keswick thought exerted some influence on the early faculty of Dallas Theological Seminary, including figures like Lewis Sperry Chafer and W. H. Griffith Thomas.

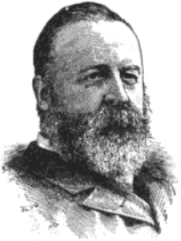
J. H. Brookes

Free grace views on topics such as assurance without introspection and eternal rewards were also found very commonly among early dispensationalists; this includes John Nelson Darby (1800–1882), James Hall Brookes (1830–1897) and C. I. Scofield (1843–1921), who argued for every believer's right for absolute assurance of salvation and the distinction between eternal life which is based on belief in the gospel and eternal reward which is merited, although despite these similarities, many of them nevertheless still held to a soft form of the perseverance of the saints. Nevertheless, this dispensationalist system made it possible to interpret large portions of the Bible as non-soteriological, allowing for the free grace distinction between justification and sanctification, and the emphasis on eternal reward as distinct from salvation.

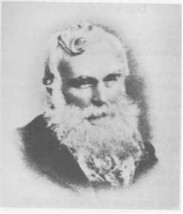
Robert Govett

Free Grace ideas were especially supported by the English dispensationalist dissenter Robert Govett (1813–1901), who left the Church of England over the issues of infant baptism and eschatology, as according to Govett, the Christian's conduct does not influence whether they receive eternal life, but rather it determines the nature of their rewards in the age to come. Govett influenced a number of later writers such as G. H. Lang (1874–1958), D. M Panton (1870–1955) and Watchman Nee (1903–1972), who held to similar views of salvation. Despite major theological differences on multiple issues, similar views to Free Grace theology on the topics of salvation by faith and eternal rewards were also taken by many ultradispensationalists, which emerged primarily through the influence of E. W. Bullinger (1837–1913), a prominent English biblical scholar and dispensationalist.

=== The modern Free Grace movement (20th–21st centuries) ===
Lewis Sperry Chafer (1871–1952) influenced modern Free Grace theologians.

The modern Free Grace movement is significantly influenced by in the theological views articulated by Lewis Sperry Chafer (February 27, 1871 – August 22, 1952), who published the book He That Is Spiritual in which he articulated many Free Grace viewpoints. This caused a smaller scale controversy in his day, when B. B. Warfield (1851–1921) took issue with Chafer's doctrine. His views were a major influence upon modern proponents of Free Grace theology. Slightly before the Lordship salvation controversy, Everett F. Harrison opposed the view that one must make Christ the "Lord of one's life" and make a commitment to follow Jesus in order to be justified. Harrison held a debate with John Stott on the issue in 1959, mirroring the Lordship salvation controversy.

The Lordship salvation controversy involved those holding to Free Grace theology. The debate was centered around the question on whether accepting Jesus Christ as savior necessarily implies one must make a concrete commitment in life toward the Christ, such as following a certain behavior or moral system. The debate surfaced when John McArthur's book The Gospel According to Jesus generated a strong response from proponents of Free Grace theology. The first to respond against the views of McArthur was Charles Ryrie, who wrote the book So Great Salvation where he articulated Free Grace theology. Zane Hodges followed by publishing his books against the Lordship salvation view. The debate was reignited in the 21st century when Wayne Grudem wrote against Free Grace theology, leading to a renewed interest in the topic. This was answered in a work published by faculty of Grace School of Theology, A Defense of Free Grace Theology, alleging misrepresentation by Grudem on Free Grace views and demonstrating the historical and biblical basis for Free Grace.

Around the 1990s, Hodges began to articulate what has been called the "crossless gospel", which—although often seen as a derogatory term—is the belief that one must only believe in Jesus' promise of eternal life to be saved; knowledge of the substitutionary atonement is unnecessary for salvation. This evolved into the crossless gospel controversy in 2005, when the Grace Evangelical Society officially declared its stance on faith to include only Jesus' promise of eternal life to the one who believes, causing many members to leave. An academic historical theologian categorized this as a modern heresy – becoming a Christian without faith in Jesus as God and Savior – the very essence of Christianity. Other Free Grace theologians associated with the Free Grace Alliance such as David R. Anderson, Joseph Dillow, Charlie Bing, and Charles Ryrie hold that one must believe in the person and work of Christ to be saved, disagreeing with the view of the Grace Evangelical Society.

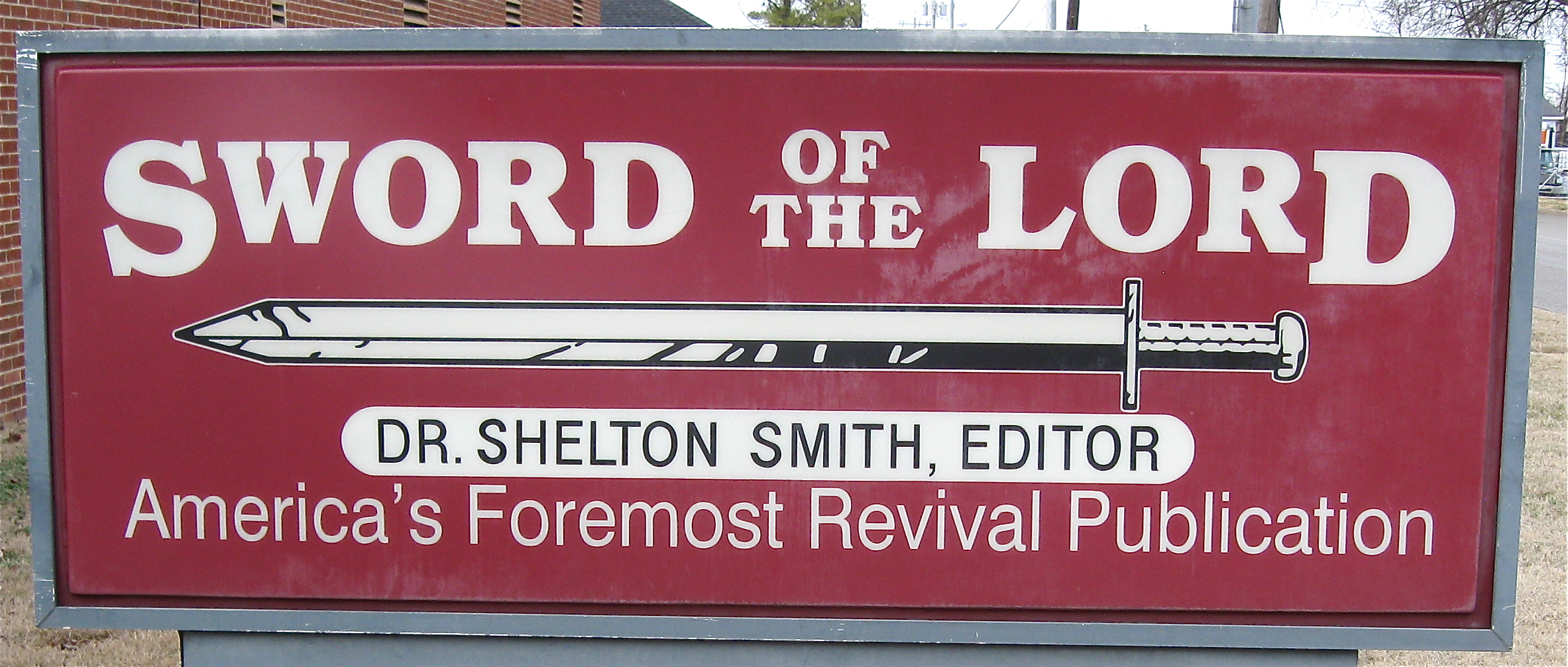
Outdoor sign of the Sword of the Lord

Similarly, there has been controversy among Independent Baptists on Free Grace views, as the chief editor of The Sword of the Lord newspaper, established by John R. Rice, became Curtis Hutson after Rice's death. However, that has been highly controversial among Independent Baptists, as he held to a Free Grace view of salvation, believing that repentance is simply a synonym for belief in Christ. Some Independent Baptists believe that Curtis Hutson changed the original stances of the newspaper held by John R. Rice, while the current chief editor Shelton Smith argued that John R. Rice did not disagree with the soteriological views of Curtis Hutson. This view was shared by the Independent Baptist author Jack Hyles, who, in his widely influential book, Let's Go Soulwinning, advocated for the change of mind view of repentance.

Free grace views of salvation were also held by the famous Southern Baptist preacher Charles Stanley. He articulated this perspective notably in his book Eternal Security, where he argued that a single moment of simple faith is sufficient to receive salvation, even if a person later apostatizes. This book was also personally endorsed by Zane Hodges.

==== Dallas Theological Seminary ====
Many modern proponents of Free Grace theology studied and taught at the Dallas Theological Seminary, including Charles Caldwell Ryrie, Zane C. Hodges, and Dave Anderson, though the seminary itself does not hold to Free Grace. A number of Free Grace churches are pastored by graduates of Dallas Theological Seminary. A number of opponents of Free Grace also graduated from Dallas Theological Seminary, including Darrel Bock and Daniel Wallace.

Dallas Theological Seminary was more influenced by Free Grace theology during the 20th century. Despite the influence of Free Grace theology at the seminary, its popularity has declined there over the last century.

==== Grace School of Theology ====
Dave Anderson, former student and professor at the Dallas Theological Seminary, established Grace School of Theology (originally Houston Theological Seminary) in 2001. Grace School of Theology promotes the Free Grace position through its classes (with over 600 students internationally) and also through Grace Theology Press, which has published many resources related to Free Grace theology.

==== Free Grace Alliance ====
Map of Free Grace Alliance affiliated churches

The Free Grace Alliance formed in November 2004 with an emphasis on international missions. Although the new organization was officially formed for a "different reason", the Free Grace Alliance split from the Grace Evangelical Society in 2005 when most of the prominent leaders (including the chairman of the board) within the Society rejected the change in the content of saving faith being taught by Zane C. Hodges and the Grace Evangelical Society changed its doctrinal statement regarding the content of saving faith. A non-association statement was made in 2009.

==== Grace Evangelical Society ====
Founded in 1986 by Robert Wilkin, the Grace Evangelical Society focuses on publishing, podcasts, and conferences. The Grace Evangelical Society was a focal point for the mainstream Free Grace movement until 2005, when it officially altered its beliefs statement to say that eternal life and eternal security are synonymous and that belief in eternal security provided by Jesus is the sole requirement for salvation.

Zane C. Hodges, a prominent Free Grace theologian, was a core theologian of the group until his death in 2008. In his later years, Hodges controversially argued that the inclusion of Jesus' promise of eternal salvation was a necessity for proper evangelization. He viewed the sole condition of eternal salvation as believing in Jesus' promise of eternal life and Grace Evangelical Society began to promote this view increasingly. In this view, a person could believe that Jesus is God and Savior who died and rose again, without believing in him for eternal salvation, and could therefore still be unsaved. A person could also become a Christian by believing in Jesus for eternal security, while rejecting that he is God and Savior from sin by his death and resurrection. This has led critics like Tom Stegall to accuse Grace Evangelical Society of holding that individuals can believe in "any" Jesus and still be saved. The change in the Grace Evangelical Society's official doctrinal statement caused many members (including the chairman of the board) and the majority of academic members to leave the society between 2005 and 2006.

==== Florida Bible College ====
The Free Grace view has also been majorly promoted by the Florida Bible College, which was started by A. Ray Stanford. It has been an institution that played a significant role in the promotion of Free Grace theology. The college was responsible for training numerous pastors, evangelists, and church leaders in the core principles of the Free Grace perspective. At the height of its influence, Florida Bible College reached an enrollment of approximately 1,500 students. Although the college eventually shut down in the late 1990s, In 2013, the institution was restarted by Ralph "Yankee" Arnold, who himself had been shaped by its teachings and had become an influential figure in the Free Grace movement.

A student of Florida Bible College, Hank Lindstrom (1940–2008) became highly influential through hosting the radio show Bibleline, and whose ministry was widely influential on the famous American wrestler Terry Gene Bollea, later known as Hulk Hogan.

==== Other expressions of Free Grace theology ====
Some other smaller non-accredited seminaries such as the Chafer Theological Seminary and Grace Biblical Seminary promote Free Grace theology and train pastors in the Free Grace view. Free Grace International is a Free Grace organization, worked on by Larry C Kitchen, Lucas Kitchen, and Shawn Lazar (who also worked in GES). Similar views have been taught by the faculty of the Hyles-Anderson college.

The Free Grace Alliance has also listed multiple other institutions, such as Independent Baptist Pensacola Christian College, the GGWO-affiliated Maryland Bible College and the Jordan Evangelical Theological Seminary among many others as Free Grace friendly.

== Beliefs ==
=== Core beliefs table ===
Core beliefs common to Free Grace theology historically include:

Belief	Explanation
Faith alone	God declares a person righteous by faith in Christ (imputed righteousness) regardless of works accompanying faith either before or after. John 3:14–17 compares believing in Jesus to the Israelites looking upon the bronze serpent in the wilderness for healing from deadly venom (Numbers 21).
Relationship differs from intimacy	A permanent relationship with God as Father and the believer as a child begins by faith alone. When someone believes, there is a "new birth" and this spiritual birth cannot be undone. However, the familial relationship does not guarantee fellowship; intimacy with God requires obedience.
Justification differs from sanctification	Justification before God is a free unconditional gift by faith alone but sanctification requires obedience to God. Sanctification of all Christians is not guaranteed. Only final glorification of all Christians to a sinless state is guaranteed (Romans 8:30; Philippians 2:12).
Eternal security	Once a person has believed in Jesus Christ as God and Savior that person spends eternity with God regardless of subsequent behavior. God's eternal acceptance is unconditionally given. Belonging to God's family is a permanent and irrevocable gift (Romans 11:29).
Assurance of salvation	Confidence of spending eternity with God is possible for every Christian since God justifies through faith alone and provides eternal security.
Rewards and discipline	All Christians will undergo judgment by Christ based upon their works and degree of conformity to Christ's character (or lack thereof). This is called the judgment seat or Bema Seat of Christ, where Christians are rewarded based on obedience to God through faith. This judgment does not concern heaven or hell but rewards (payment for service) or temporary punishment. God's familial acceptance of his children is unconditionally given. However, God's payments of eternal honor, riches, and positions of authority are only given for children who obediently served God. Good parents discipline their children and will not approve behavior that is detrimental. Neither will God approve sinful behavior that leads to destructive consequences (Hebrews 12:5–11).

=== Soteriology ===
Free grace theology is distinguished by holding a strong version of the doctrine of faith alone. Free grace theologies hold that things such as turning from sin, baptism, or perseverance in the faith are not necessary for salvation, but instead hold that these things are necessary for eternal rewards. Free grace writers generally agree that good works do not play a role in meriting, maintaining, or proving eternal life. In other words, Jesus "graciously" provides eternal salvation as a free gift to those who believe in Him. Free grace theologians universally hold to eternal security, however they deny that every believer will necessarily persevere. Thus, Free Grace theologians hold that anyone who believes in Jesus Christ will go to heaven regardless of any future actions – including future sin, unbelief, or apostasy – though Christians who sin or abandon the faith will face God's discipline.

For example, Charles Stanley stated:

Look at that verse [John 3:18] and answer this question: According to Jesus, what must a person do to keep from being judged for sin? Must he stop doing something? Must he promise to stop doing something? Must he have never done something? The answer is so simple that many stumble all over it without ever seeing it. All Jesus requires is that the individual "believe in" Him.

Similarly Robert Thieme, a Free Grace theologian wrote:

Although the believer can never lose his eternal life, he can be in danger of destroying his spiritual life and losing all the blessings that “God has prepared for those who love him

Free grace theology is distinguished by its treatment of the words "salvation" and "save" in the Bible. These theologians argue that there are many ways believers can experience "salvation", not necessarily referring to salvation from hell. This view cites verses such as Acts 27:34, where the Greek word σωτηρῐ́ᾱ sōtēríā – typically translated as 'salvation' – is translated "health" or "strength" because food will assist their deliverance from physical death. Spiritually, salvation is seen as referring to deliverance from the eternal penalty of sin (justification), the current power of sin over the Christian (sanctification), the removal of any possibility to sin (glorification), and being restored to stewardship over the world as God intended for humankind at creation (restoration to rule). Free grace theologians generally hold that the "quality of faith" does not matter in salvation, but only the object of faith, as Charlie Bing says: "To emphasize the quality of one's faith necessarily means that the object of faith is de-emphasized".

Free grace theology is distinguished from Hyper-Grace theology taught by a few Charismatic teachers by arguing that a believer may experience temporal judgement for sin.

=== Judgement seat of Christ ===
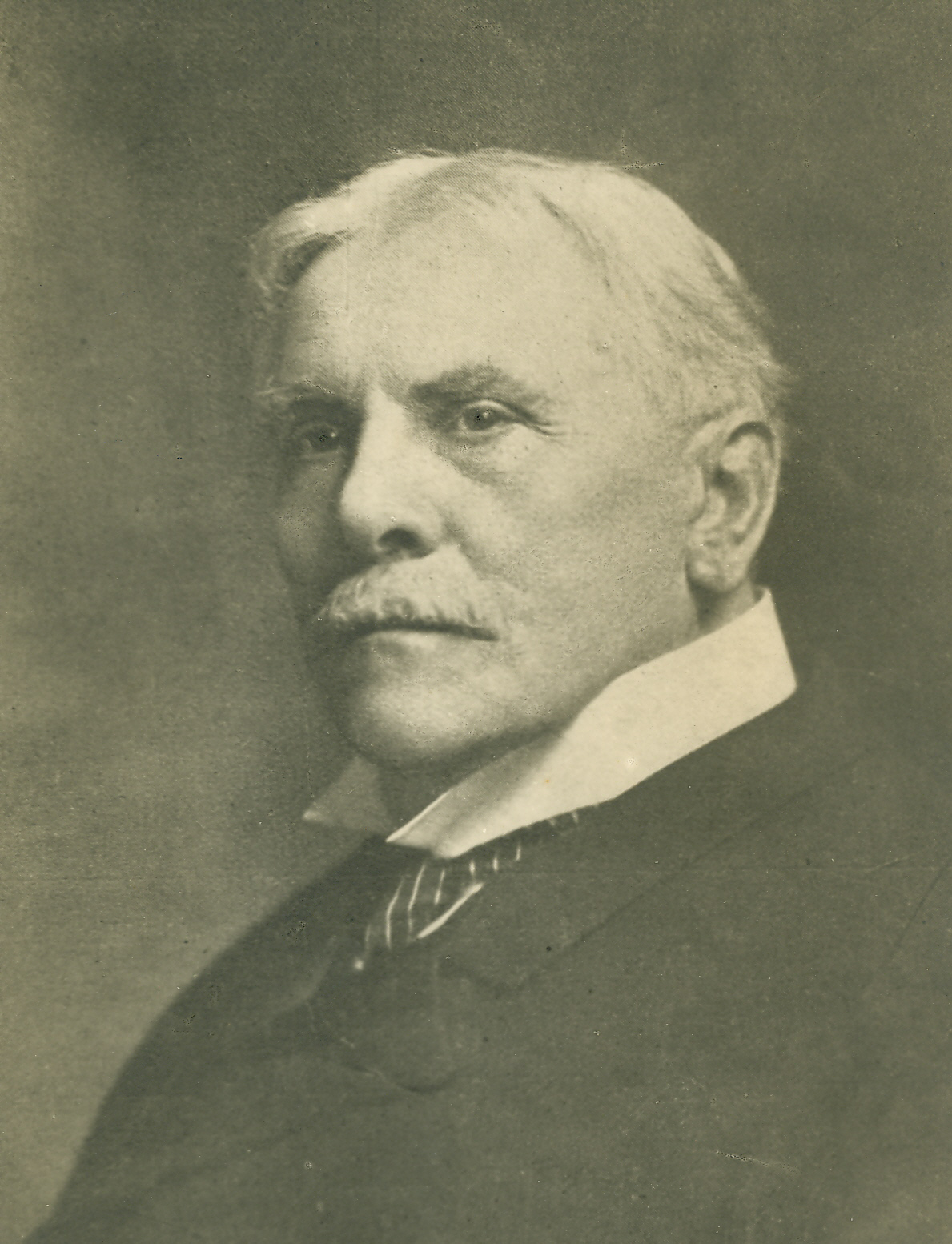
Cyrus Scofield emphasized the distinction of reward and eternal life.

Free grace theologians put a heavy emphasis on the doctrine of eternal rewards, which are determined in the judgement seat of Christ. In this system, passages which seem to connect justification with good works are instead viewed as referencing eternal rewards, not eternal salvation. The view that individuals will have differing degrees of reward depending upon their service is based on an interpretation of Paul's words in his first epistle to the Corinthians, in which he references being saved "through fire". Free grace theologians have taken this to mean that those who have not served Christ will be saved, but forfeit eternal rewards. This view of eternal rewards has been influenced by the writings of Scofield, who in his Scofield Reference Bible strongly distinguished salvation which he viewed to be a free gift from rewards which he saw to be earned by works. He further in his book Rightly Dividing the Word of Truth further argued that God's purpose in promising eternal rewards was to sustain his people through persecution.

Jody Dillow divided eternal rewards into three categories: rewards of enhanced intimacy, rewards of honor, and rewards of service. Wilson exposed the error of "rewards only" at the Judgment Seat of Christ as arising from Darby's disciples confusing the Olympic games' exedra with the judicial judgment of Rome. Christians will receive payment for both good and bad (2 Cor 5:10; Col 3:24).

=== Divine discipline ===
Free grace theologians hold that unrighteous believers will experience severe divine discipline. Free grace theologians often interpret the warnings in the book of Hebrews, such as those at the tenth and sixth chapters to be warnings of severe divine discipline for apostasy. Although some, such as Norman Geisler, understood these warnings as pertaining to eternal rewards.

=== Fellowship with God ===
Reformed theologians have often taken the First Epistle of John to be written as a test to be able to know if an individual is justified. However, in the Free Grace view the epistle is viewed as being a test on if the person is in fellowship with God. Thus Free Grace theologians interpret words such as "know" in the Epistle to refer to intimacy rather than salvation. The theology also distinguishes between two kinds of forgiveness: positional and familial. Free grace theologians hold that positional forgiveness is received through faith alone, while familial forgiveness through confession. Familial forgiveness is not viewed as the basis of salvation but of fellowship and intimacy with God.

=== Dispensationalism ===
A Dispensationalist chart of world history. Most Free Grace Theologians affirm dispesationalism.

Modern Free Grace theology is typically, though not necessarily, associated with dispensationalism. Some theologians have argued that Free Grace theology arises naturally from dispensationalist premises. However, a minority of theologians who hold to Free Grace soteriology do so without affirming dispensationalism, and the Free Grace Alliance has once allowed a non-dispensational speaker to their conference. To this, the Free Grace theologian Dave Anderson argued that Free Grace is more fundamentally connected to premillennialism than to dispensationalism as a whole itself. Therefore, while dispensationalism often overlaps with Free Grace theology, Anderson maintainsed that premillennial eschatology provides the more central doctrinal foundation to Free Grace theology.

Ultradispensationalist teachers often have also have held a similar views of salvation as Free grace theologians, yet differ significantly in their interpretation of the New Testament, particularly regarding the Church and the relevance of some New testament epistles. These areas of difference place them outside the mainstream of the Free Grace movement.

=== Assurance ===
One of the unique aspects of Free Grace theology is its position on assurance. All Free Grace advocates agree that assurance of spending eternity with God is based on the promise of scripture through faith alone in Jesus Christ and not one's works or subsequent progression in sanctification. This view strongly distinguishes the gift of eternal life (accompanying justification by faith) from discipleship (obedience). Free grace teaches that a person does not need to promise disciplined behavior or good works in exchange for God's eternal salvation; thus, one cannot lose salvation through sinning and potential failure and assurance is based on the Bible, not introspection into one's works. According to this view, God declares persons righteous through Christ's perfection. Whatever little progress humans make towards perfection is infinitesimal compared to Christ's perfection. Therein, comparing one's progress towards perfection with another person's progress is viewed as unwise (2 Cor 10:12). Assurance is based on Christ's perfection given freely to believers (imputed righteousness) and not based on progressive steps of holiness. The Dallas Theological Seminary sums up the general consensus of Free Grace theology in Article XI of its doctrinal statement, in reference to assurance:

We believe it is the privilege, not only of some, but of all who are born again by the Spirit through faith in Christ as revealed in the Scriptures, to be assured of their salvation from the very day they take Him to be their Savior and that this assurance is not founded upon any fancied discovery of their own worthiness or fitness, but wholly upon the testimony of God in His written Word, exciting within His children filial love, gratitude, and obedience (Luke 10:20; 22:32; 2 Cor. 5:1, 6–8; 2 Tim. 1:12; Heb. 10:22; 1 John 5:13).

=== Sanctification ===
Free grace theology holds to a synergistic view of sanctification, believing that though sanctification is God's work; it is not automatic nor passive. If the believer chooses not to cooperate with God's grace, then he will not be sanctified. However, despite allowing for a truly saved individual to live carnally, they believe that only such a framework allows people to do good works from the position of gratitude rather than under compulsion.

=== Discipleship ===
Free grace theologians distinguish between discipleship and salvation, holding that discipleship is a condition of an enhanced experience of life (eternal rewards), but not necessary for salvation. Discipleship is also not viewed as an inevitable result of salvation, as Free Grace theology allows for a true Christian to not respond to the call of discipleship. Some theologians such as Joseph Dillow, Charlie Bing, and Zane Hodges also distinguish between Christians who are "overcomers" and those who are not; this view is based on an interpretation of the Book of Revelation, referencing "those who overcome". In this view, overcoming, interpreted as victory in the Christian life, is a basis of eternal rewards. However, unlike the distinction between discipleship and salvation, the distinction between "overcomers" and those who do not overcome is not held by all Free Grace theologians, citing 1 John 5:4, which states: "For whatsoever is born of God overcometh the world: and this is the victory that overcometh the world, even our faith.", though those holding to the distinction argue that the term "overcome" is used differently in Revelation and the Epistle of John.

== Differences within Free Grace theology ==
=== Outer darkness ===
Some Free Grace Christians, such as Joseph Dillow, Charles Stanley, Zane Hodges have controversially argued that the "outer darkness" mentioned in Matthew 22:13 does not refer to hell, but rather to exclusion from reigning with Christ during the millennial kingdom.

The question of who will participate in Christ's future millennial reign has been a point of debate among Free Grace theologians. 2 Timothy 2:12–13 (KJV) states: "If we suffer, we shall also reign with him: if we deny him, he also will deny us: If we believe not, yet he abideth faithful: he cannot deny himself." Joseph Dillow, along with some others, have argued that only faithful believers those who "overcome" will reign with Christ, while unfaithful believers will still enter the kingdom but be excluded from positions of authority. Other Free Grace proponents interpret this passage differently, suggesting it does not question a believer's right to reign, but rather that the quality or extent of that reign may be diminished by unfaithfulness. However, this interpretation is not universally held within the Free Grace movement, and has been widely criticized. This view has been criticized as teaching a "Protestant purgatory" by its critics, although its advocates have avoided that terminology, denying that it is a place of torment or a necessary step of purification.

Watchman Nee, Robert Govett, D. M. Pember, and D. M. Panton advanced a more radical view: that only righteous believers will be permitted to enter the millennial kingdom. According to their interpretation, carnal believers who lived unfaithfully will be consigned to a literal place of torment for the duration of 1,000 years, a literal but temporary place of chastisement.

=== Good works ===
There are some differences among Free Grace theologians on the issue of fruit in a Christian life. More moderate Free Grace theologians still affirm that faith will necessarily lead into good works, although it may not be outwardly evident or last to the end of one's life. However, those who hold to a more strong form of Free Grace theology deny that every Christian will bear fruit in their life. Many such as Bob Wilkin, Zane Hodges, and Joseph Dillow, among others hold that the one who possesses "dead faith" – as mentioned James 2:17 – is not a false convert, in this view the word "dead" refers to a faith that is not profitable in this life nor in the judgement seat of Christ, but does not imply false conversion. Thus, when the epistle of James says "can that faith save him", it is either understood as salvation from temporal consequences of sin (as with Hodges), salvation from a loss of reward (as with Bing), both (as with Dillow), or as the physical salvation of the poor person described in the chapter (as with R. T. Kendall). These theologians have argued that James contextually does not speak of eternal salvation. Kenneth Wilson argued that the interpretation of James 2 that has led to the view that the "false faith of demons" lacks works while "true faith" must always produce good works was an error highly influenced by Augustine of Hippo.

In contrast, Charles Ryrie, though a Free Grace theologian, held that genuine faith naturally produces good works, interpreting the Epistle of James as referring to eternal salvation. While opposing Lordship Salvation, Ryrie maintained that believers may not always bear visible fruit or that such fruit may not be clearly externally evident. He asserted that believers will indeed bear fruit "somehow, sometime, somewhere," yet he acknowledged the possibility of the "carnal Christian" category. Ryrie also criticized Lordship Salvation’s emphasis on good works, arguing that it tends to turn believers into "fruit inspectors," overly focused on finding outward evidence for faith.

=== Content of faith ===
There is some controversy on the object of faith among Free Grace theologians. Zane Hodges in his later life and the Grace Evangelical Society have held that faith is assent in the promise of eternal life. The Grace Evangelical Society teaches that knowledge of the deity, atonement, and the resurrection of Christ is not necessary to be saved, but they are seen as necessary for sanctification. That is, a person can become a Christian without believing that Jesus is God in the flesh or a personal Savior from sin. This recent change has not been accepted by most proponents of Free Grace theology, and is rejected by the faculty at Grace School of Theology. Theologians such as Charles Ryrie, Charlie Bing, and Jody Dillow view the object of faith as the person and work of Jesus Christ. A smaller scale disagreement exists on if the burial of Christ had soteriological significance, or if it was a mere proof of his death.

=== Election ===
There are many views of election within Free Grace theology, with most holding to a form of conditional election and libertarian free will, although some held to a moderate form of Calvinism. Charlie Bing listed the following views as being taught by individuals within Free Grace theology:

- A moderate form of the Calvinistic view of election, this has been taught by Charles Ryrie and Lewis Sperry Chafer.
- Election grounded upon God's foreknowledge, which is the Classical Arminian view of election. Although those Free Grace theologians who hold to this view reject the Arminian view of conditional security.
- Corporate election
- Conditional election grounded upon God's middle-knowledge which is Molinism, this has been taught by the Free Grace author John Correia.
- Qualitive election, which is the view that God's election is always unto service; this has been taught by Shawn Lazar along with the Grace Evangelical Society.

=== Atonement ===
Some Free Grace theologians such as Zane Hodges and the Grace Evangelical Society view of the atonement which proposes that although Christ died for our sins, it is not applied to the person until receiving it by belief, rather arguing that the atonement is applied universally. However, to avoid universalism, he denied that the application of the atonement guaranteed deliverance from hell, by distinguish hell from the penalty of sin, rather viewing it as the consequence of not having eternal life. This position was however criticized by Jody Dillow, who argued that the Bible clearly presents hell as the punishment that sin deserves.

=== Repentance ===
Free grace theology approaches the doctrine of repentance in a different way than most other Christian traditions. Free grace theologians have generally held one of three views on repentance:

A major number of Free Grace theologians, including: Harry A. Ironside, Lewis Sperry Chafer, Charles Ryrie, Walvoord, Pentecost, Charlie Bing, and others have taught that repentance (Ancient Greek: μετᾰ́νοιᾰ metanoia) should be treated as a change of mind not as a turning from sin or sorrow for sin. Thus, in this view, repentance is viewed as a synonym for faith. This viewpoint has been commonly taught by Independent Baptists such as Jack Hyles and Curtis Hutson.

A second view was suggested by Zane C. Hodges, David Anderson, and Robert Wilkin (although initially holding to the view of Ryrie and Chafer), in which repentance is defined as turning from one's sins, but repentance is not a requirement for eternal life, only faith in Christ. Hodges presented this view in his book Harmony with God, where he argued that repentance is not a condition of salvation, but is a condition of fellowship with God and sanctification. However, repentance may be preached to unbelievers, in which case it makes one more disposed to faith in Christ. In this view, passages such as Luke 13:3 are viewed temporarily and corporately, Hodges argued that Jesus is warning the nation of Israel of the destruction of Judea by the Romans.

Joseph Dillow taught instead that repentance refers to remorse or regret for sin, in his view being a necessary pre-condition of faith. However, Dillow rejected the view that repentance should be viewed as commitment to Christ.

== Notable individuals associated with Free Grace theology ==
- Robert Sandeman (1718–1771)
- Archibald McLean (1733–1812)
- Charles Henry Mackintosh (1820–1896)
- Robert Govett (1813–1901)
- James Hall Brookes (1830–1897)
- G.H Pember (1837–1910)
- C. I. Scofield (1843–1921)
- David M. Panton (1870 – 20 May 1955)
- Lewis Sperry Chafer (1871–1952)
- G.H. Lang (1874–1958)
- Harry A. Ironside (1876–1951)
- M.R. DeHaan (1891–1965)
- Lance Latham (1894–1985)
- Erich Sauer (1898–1959)
- Everett Harrison (1902–1999)
- Watchman Nee (1903–1972)
- J. Vernon McGee (1904–1988)
- Witness Lee (1905–1997)
- Merrill Unger (1909–1980)
- John Walvoord (1910–2002)
- Miles Stanford (1914–1999)
- J. Dwight Pentecost (1915–2014)
- Robert Thieme (1918–2009)
- Peter Ruckman (1921–2016)
- Howard Hendricks (1924–2013)
- Charles Ryrie (1925–2016)
- Jack Hyles (1926–2001)
- Ernest Pickering (1928–2000)
- Roy Zuck (1932–2013)
- Charles Stanley (1932–2023)
- Zane C. Hodges (1932–2008)
- Norman Geisler (1932–2019)
- Curtis Hutson (1934 – 1995)
- Chuck Swindoll (born 1934)
- R. T. Kendall (born 1935)
- Shelton Smith (born 1942)
- Tony Evans (born 1949)
- J. Paul Tanner (born 1950)
- Robert Wilkin

== See also ==
- Dispensationalist theology
- Grace Evangelical Society
- Lordship salvation controversy
- Marrow Controversy
- Sola fide
