= Grace Evangelical Society =

Evangelical Christian organization

- Abbreviation: GES
- Formation: 1986 in Dallas, Texas
- Type: Advocacy organization
- Purpose: "The aim of GES is to promote the clear proclamation of God's free salvation through faith alone in Christ alone, which is properly correlated with and yet distinguished from issues related to discipleship."
- Headquarters: Denton, Texas, USA
- Region served: Worldwide
- Executive Director: Bob Wilkin
- Website: http://www.faithalone.org/

Grace Evangelical Society (GES) is an evangelical Christian advocacy organization based in Denton, Texas, whose purpose is to promote Free Grace Theology. Founded in 1986, GES is a non-profit, evangelical publisher specializing in books that deal with soteriology from a free grace perspective. GES also holds an annual international conference, currently at Camp Copass in Denton, Texas. The executive director, Robert N. (Bob) Wilkin, speaks across the country at churches and regional conferences and has written several books. The ministry critiques certain ideas in evangelism and theology, especially strains of Covenant theology, Puritanism and Lordship salvation.

== History ==
GES was founded in June 1986 when dispensationalist Bob Wilkin sent out newsletters to likeminded associates regarding soteriology within conservative American churches. Wilkin had obtained a BS at the University of California, Irvine in 1973, a ThM from Dallas Theological Seminary in 1982, and a PhD at Dallas Theological Seminary in 1985. In 1988, the Journal of the Grace Evangelical Society (JOTGES) was founded; Arthur L. Farstad became its first editor. That same year, Zondervan published The Gospel According to Jesus by John MacArthur Jr., a work which would crystallize the influence of Lordship Salvation Theology in Dispensational circles. In 1994, the GES published The Epistle of James, Proven Character Through Testing by Zane C. Hodges, the first title in a project conceived as single book-length commentary for each NT book. As the representative of the GES in public debates, Dr. Wilkin has engaged Progressive Dispensationalist and former president of the Evangelical Theological Society, Darrell Bock, and the Calvinist apologist and writer James White.

== Projects ==
The Journal of the Grace Evangelical Society (JOTGES) was first published in 1988, and is published semi-annually.

GES has two commentary projects. The first is a long-term effort in publishing verse-by-verse commentaries of each book in the NT (The Epistle of James: Proven Character Through Testing, Hodges, 1994. The Epistles of John: Walking in the Light of God's Love, Hodges, 1999). The other is the two-volume Grace New Testament Commentary published in March 2010, a 1300-page hardcover commentary on the entire New Testament containing work by thirteen contributing authors, including J. Paul Tanner, Gary Derickson, Dwight Hunt, Hal Haller, Rene Lopez, Al Valdes, Zane Hodges, and Bob Wilkin.
