= Carl Stevens =

Carl or Karl Stevens may refer to:

- Carl H. Stevens Jr. (1929–2008), American clergyman
- Carl Stevens (wrestler)
- Carl Stevens, orchestrator in 1950s for artists including Nick Noble
- Karl Stevens (born 1978), novelist and painter

== See also ==
- Karl Steven (born 1973), New Zealand musician and composer
- Carl Steven (1974–2011), American actor
