= George H. Lang =

English biblical scholar

George Henry Lang (20 November 1874 – 20 October 1958) was an English Bible teacher, author, and biblical scholar.

Of his Christian contemporaries, Lang was influenced by the writings of G.H. Pember, C.H. Spurgeon, Arthur Tappan Pierson, and George Müller.

== Life and Belief ==
Lang was born in Greenwich, England. His mother died shortly after Lang's birth, and he was raised under the influence of his Christian father. Lang made a profession of the Christian faith and dedicated his life to Jesus Christ at 7 years old. His family belonged to the Exclusive Brethren; but later in life, he affiliated himself with the Open Brethren.

Lang held the belief that the only qualification for a believer was having made a sincere profession of faith. For this one belief, Lang is considered by some Plymouth Brethren as the most controversial figure since Darby regarding the administration of the Church affairs. Later in Lang's life and teachings, he challenged Darby's "federation view" of the church and stressed the local fellowship's autonomy and independence.

== Ministry and work ==
Lang upheld a principle that he "did not look to man for the means of his subsistence, but only to God", and Lang's faith grew with its exercise. In Lang's words,

Praying is working, and not merely an adjunct to working. It is a form of working, and not simply a somewhat properly added to our efforts out of reverence to the Almighty; nor is it only an appeal for His blessing to prosper our labours. When a righteous man prays he works. For prayer in the spirit is one agency by which the Spirit of God effects through the believer His will, and is, indeed, a putting forth of His energy.

Lang was a very close student of the Holy Scriptures and an independent thinker. He was not prepared to take traditional interpretations unless he was personally convinced that they were right. Lang was also an active Gospel preacher and from time to time he was found in countries from the Arabian deserts to the Russian steppes preaching. Lang almost traveled and preached in the entire world in his missionary career.

Lang once said,

No man should write a book until he is 40. He needs to prove his theories in practice before publishing.

Most of Lang's books were published after he was 50 years old.

== Death ==
Lang died at age 83, in Wimborne, Dorset, England.

== Books ==
Lang's writings include fourteen major books and many other booklets. Some of his works are noted below.

- Anthony Norris Groves - Biography of A.N. Groves
- Praying is Working
- Atoning Blood
- The Unequal Yoke
- Firstfruits and Harvest
- Firstborn Sons -Their Rights and Risk
- The New Birth
- The Clean Heart
- Balanced Christianity
- Coming Events, An Outline of Bible Prophecy
- The Earlier Years of the Modern Tongues Movement
- Departure - An Appeal Addressed by one of Themselves Mainly to Christians Known as Open Brethren
- Divine Guidance - Its Reality, Methods, Conditions
- The First Resurrection
- God's Plan - Christ's Suffering and the Spirit's Power
- The History and Diaries of an Indian Christian - J.C. Aroolappen
- The Local Assembly
- The Histories and Prophecies of Daniel
- The Epistle to the Hebrews
- The Revelation of Jesus Christ
- An Ordered Life - The Autobiography of G.H. Lang

=== Translations ===
Translated by Lang from the German language of Erich Sauer:

- The Dawn of World Redemption
- The Triumph of the Crucified
- From Eternity to Eternity
- In the Arena of Faith

== See also ==
- Robert Govett
- Watchman Nee
- John Nelson Darby
- Plymouth Brethren
- Local Churches
