= Lordship salvation =

Evangelical Christian doctrine

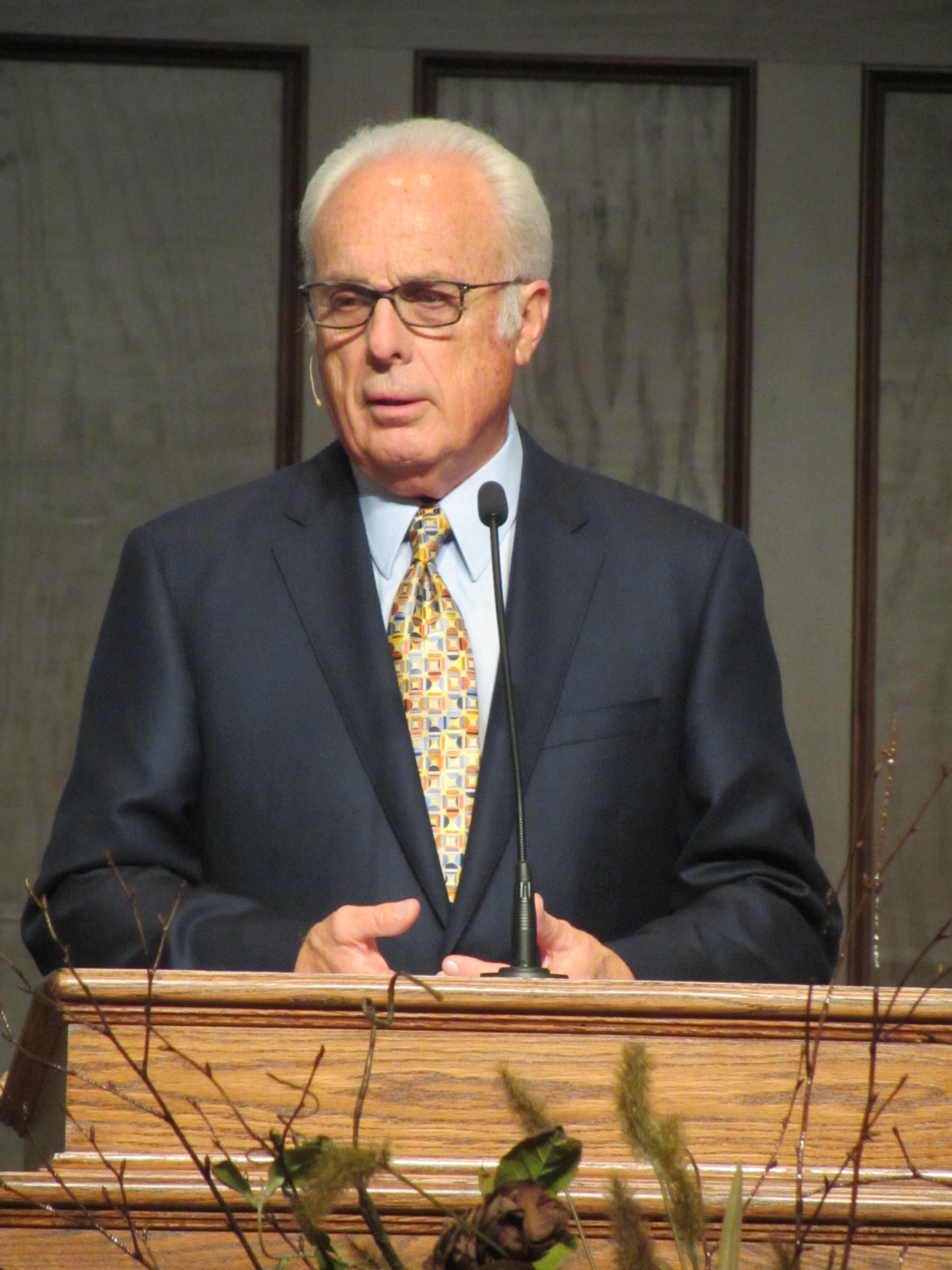
John MacArthur

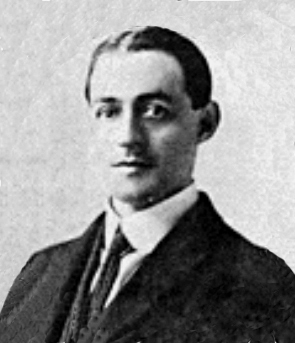
Arthur W. Pink (1886–1952) advocated Lordship salvation

Lordship salvation is a doctrine taught by many past and present Evangelical theologians, being associated with popular figures such as John MacArthur, John Piper and R. C. Sproul. Lordship salvation teaches that although Christians are saved by faith alone, saving faith must be accompanied by submission to the Lordship of Christ, which leads to an obedient life as fruit. This doctrine is in stark contrast with Free Grace theology, which sees faith as distinct from a personal decision to turn from one's sins and submit to Jesus.

== Teachings ==
=== Reformed ===
John MacArthur describes Lordship salvation as the view that a decision to turn from sin and submit to Jesus must be conjoined with saving faith, leading to a lifetime of fruit, although a person can temporarily fall from obedience. This view denies a distinction between discipleship and salvation, seeing the gospel as a call to discipleship and submission. Thus, it teaches that salvation should be viewed as costly, not only because of the cost Jesus paid for the salvation of the elect, but also for the cost which the individual will have to pay for it. Additionally teaching that assurance of salvation necessitates self-examination.

Advocates of Lordship salvation oppose the doctrine of Free Grace theology, criticizing them for viewing repentance as a mere synonym for faith and for denying personal commitment as a part of saving faith. Lordship salvation advocates such as John Gerstner view Free Grace theology as "Antinomian", arguing that it does not square with the biblical doctrines of grace.

Some advocates of the doctrine such as John Piper additionally teach, that the fruit in the life of a Christian will be the determining factor for "final salvation". Teaching that although initial justification is by faith alone, good works generated by the Holy Spirit will be the basis of final salvation at the judgement of a Christian after death, saying that Christians are saved by faith and the fruit they have generated.

=== Methodist ===
Wesleyan Methodist theology stresses the importance of obedience after justification and is thus seen as upholding Lordship salvation. Those who do not bear fruit or engage in sin (and do not repent) are seen by Wesleyan-Arminians as "fall[ing] from grace into apostasy." Methodist theologian Brian Black summarizes the Wesleyan doctrine on works of righteousness in relation to salvation:

One must always strive to do his utmost for God out of love for Him, but in order to maintain salvation, a person must not willfully disobey God. All Christians must keep firmly in mind that none will have their sins forgiven by any efforts of their own. We are totally saved by grace through faith in Christ. Yet, we must never forget that one who is just shall live by faith (Ro 1:17). It is not a single act of faith but a continual life of faith that leads to final salvation (Ro 11:19-22). The word translated faith can also be translated faithfulness. To have faith in Christ also means to be faithful to Christ. Faithfulness to Christ involves keeping the commands of Christ. At the judgment, Christ will tell those who commit iniquity to depart from Him (Mt 7:23).

== Lordship salvation controversy ==
The Lordship salvation dispute opposes two soteriological visions: "whether it is necessary to accept Christ as Lord in order to have Him as one's Savior. The question then becomes, If someone accepts Christ as Savior without also explicitly accepting Him as Lord, is such a person truly saved?". That is, whether accepting Jesus Christ as saviour necessarily implies one must make a concrete commitment in life toward the Christ such as following a certain behaviour or moral system. The first opinion, that of the lordship salvation supporters, is, as Arthur W. Pink summarises: "No one can receive Christ as His Savior while he rejects Him as Lord. Therefore, those who have not bowed to Christ’s scepter and enthroned Him in their hearts and lives, and yet imagine that they are trusting Him as Savior, are deceived". The second opinion is that of those opposing lordship salvation: that one can accept Jesus Christ as saviour, but does not need to accept the Christ's lordship.

=== Forerunners ===
The Neonomian doctrines of Richard Baxter have often been compared to Lordship salvation, which caused a controversy with the Marrow Brethren in the 17th century. The Antinomian controversy is the most similar controversy in history to the modern Lordship salvation controversy.

=== Modern Controversy ===
An early discussion about the initial conversion aspect of the Lordship salvation issue was in the 1948 systematic theology of Lewis Sperry Chafer, using (and criticizing) the phrase "believe and surrender to God". A.W. Pink, also used this language, but anticipated (and advocated) key terms in the later debate, speaking of both 'surrender' and 'Lordship'. Connection of the word "Lordship" and salvation existed in a Ph.D. dissertation at Wheaton College in 1958. Therefore, the use of the term 'Lordship salvation' came before the first edition of MacArthur's 1988 book, possibly after the 1959 debate in Eternity magazine, Sep 1959, between Presbyterian Everett F. Harrison, a professor at Fuller Theological Seminary, and John Stott, an Anglican theologian. In 1959, Eternity featured a twin set of articles which ignited the debate and the use of the idiom from the titles: what Christ must "be." Ten years later (1969), Charles Ryrie used this idiom in a chapter title, verbatim, quoting exactly the title of the articles in Eternity Magazine, September, 1959. This idiom, what Christ must "be", was used to derive and discuss the implications for salvation associated with what Christ is. One author, Arthur W. Pink (1886–1952), had already associated Christ's Lordship with surrendering to it as a sine qua non at the initial point.

In 1988, John F. MacArthur Jr published the first edition of The Gospel According to Jesus. By defining salvation by what it produces and what salvation will not fail to produce, (not only glorification, but good works, repentance, faith, sanctification, yieldedness, and obedience) the book not only heavily spread the extent of the debate, but the debate expanded in scope, from questions about conversion issues, to questions about what is also necessary, and who it is who does what, throughout the Christian life. Using surrender language in the gospel became another issue.

Free Grace theology became an umbrella term for a variety of opposing or contrasting positions, sometimes arguing that Lordship salvation was legalistic, sometimes more opposed to it than that, for example, faulting it for not being specific about what degree, quality, and current visibility there must be to the necessary obedience. Figures of the Reformed tradition and their historical dispute with Arminian Protestants over a person's participatory role in salvation, a debate which many Calvinists identify with the original sin issue Augustine wrote of in his polemics against the British monk Pelagius, gave Reformed scholars and church leaders an intellectual tradition from which to oppose what they considered a false gospel.

Modern advocates of Lordship salvation have included individuals such as John MacArthur, John Piper, R. C Sproul, John Stott, B.B. Warfield, Arthur W. Pink, John Gerstner, Matthew Slick, and Kenneth Gentry. A similar controversy was caused by the Neonomianism of Richard Baxter, to which Lordship salvation has been compared.

=== Opposing beliefs ===
The Lordship salvation has gained opposition from some Reformed theologians such as R. Scott Clark, Free Grace theologians such as Charles Ryrie and Zane Hodges along with from those who belong to the so-called "Hyper-Grace" movement such as Andrew Farley. Critics of Lordship salvation generally argue that it makes assurance impossible, often arguing that it is inconsistent with salvation by faith alone. Other critics, such as Ryrie and Hodges, further argue that Lordship salvation is a false gospel, which cannot save, and that the position repeats the Galatian error. Reformed critics of Lordship salvation such as R. Scott Clark, who is a Reformed seminary professor at Westminster Seminary California, have argued that the doctrine of Lordship salvation does not accurately reflect the Reformation understanding of justification, claiming that it repeats aspects of the medieval understanding of justification which the Reformers rejected. Although Scott Clark rejects Lordship salvation, he also rejected the Free Grace views held by Hodges, arguing that it is an antinomian reaction to the moralism that has developed in the church.

== See also ==
- Marrow Controversy
- Neonomianism
- Antinomian controversy
- Perseverance of the saints
- Christian perfection
- Justification (theology)
- Holiness movement
- Sanctification
- What Would Jesus Do
- Merit (Christianity)
- Good works
- Jesus is Lord
- Marrow controversy
