= Zane C. Hodges =

American biblical scholar (1932–2008)

Zane Clark Hodges
- Born: June 15, 1932; Chambersburg, Pennsylvania
- Died: November 23, 2008 (aged 76); Mesquite, Texas
- Occupations: Minister, writer, professor

Academic background
- Education: Wheaton College
- Alma mater: Dallas Theological Seminary (Th.M.)
- Thesis: The Text of Aleph in the Apocalypse (1958 (Th.M.))

Academic work
- Institutions: Dallas Seminary

Zane Clark Hodges (June 15, 1932 – November 23, 2008) was an American pastor, seminary professor, and Bible scholar.

Some of the views he is known for are these:

- "Free grace theology," a view that holds that eternal life is received as a gift only through belief in Jesus Christ for eternal life and it need not necessarily result in repentance or good works. Therefore, one need not preach repentance when preaching the message of salvation.
- "Eternal rewards," a view that various passages in the New Testament are not dealing with eternal salvation but addressing Christians and the opportunity to earn eternal rewards or to caution against their loss.
- His position in support of the Majority Text (Byzantine priority).

== Life ==
Hodges was reared in Chambersburg, Pennsylvania, and came to Dallas, Texas in the fall of 1954 after receiving a bachelor's degree from Wheaton College. He received a master of theology degree from Dallas Theological Seminary in 1958. He then taught New Testament Greek and Exegesis (1959–1986) at Dallas Seminary and was chairman of the New Testament Department for some time.

Hodges also served as pastor at Victor Street Bible Chapel, formerly The Old Mission in Dallas, for almost 50 years. Later in his life, he was active in the Oak Cliff Bible Fellowship and the Grace Evangelical Society. He was the founder and president of Kerugma Ministries.

== Theology ==
=== Free grace ===
In the late 1980s, Hodges and John F. MacArthur presented differing views over the gospel through various books, generally known as the "Lordship salvation controversy". Hodges propagated the free grace position, which teaches that the gift of eternal life is without cost to the believer, that it comes through simply believing in Jesus Christ and there is no need of any repentance or obedience to be followed. A distinction is recognized between believing (which results in receiving eternal life) and submission to the Lordship of Christ (which is part of the sanctification process). Free grace Theology also teaches that once a person believes in Jesus Christ, he cannot lose his salvation. MacArthur argued instead for Lordship Salvation, claiming that salvation is by faith alone, and it would lead to repentance and results in good works, and that a true Christian would not continue sinning without remorse but would instead obey God's commands to do good works. MacArthur viewed biblical faith as always leading to surrender and obedience, while Hodges taught that biblical faith was the conviction that something is true.

=== Repentance ===
Hodges rejected the view of repentance as a "change of mind", holding instead the view that it is a God-fearing decision to turn from sin: "Repentance is the decision to turn from sin to avoid, or bring to an end, God's temporal judgment" (Harmony with God, p. 57). Hodges stresses that repentance facilitates faith in Christ, but is not a condition for eternal salvation, nor is it part of faith itself. "It is one thing to say that repentance facilitates faith in Christ—the Bible teaches that. It is quite another thing to say that repentance is a requirement for eternal life. That the Bible does not teach" (Harmony with God, p. 93).

Initially in his book Absolutely Free! and later in more detail in his book Harmony with God Hodges took the position that the process of repentance may be a preparatory step in coming to salvation and should be evident in the life of a believer, but eternal life is received by believing in Jesus, not by turning from sin. Hodges points out that the gospel of John, which he claims is the only book of the Bible written to lead the unsaved to Christ, never uses the term "repentance." In Harmony with God Hodges says there is only one answer to the question, "What must I do to be saved?" Hodges emphatically states, "[Paul's and Silas's] answer said absolutely nothing about repentance. Instead they gave the famous and simple reply 'Believe on the Lord Jesus Christ, and you will be saved' (Acts 16:31)."

=== Majority Text ===
In 1982, Hodges published with Arthur L. Farstad an edition of The Greek New Testament According to the Majority Text with Apparatus. The Byzantine text-type, or Majority Text, is considered by its advocates to be a more accurate rendering of the Greek New Testament, in contrast with the Alexandrian text-type, which is used in the Nestle-Aland (N/A) text and the United Bible Societies Greek Testament (UBS). Hodges argues:

The amount of variation between the manuscripts containing the Majority Text appears to be significantly less than the variations found in the papyrus texts of Egypt. This is to say that any two manuscripts containing the Majority Text are likely to differ with each other less than any two papyri might differ from one another. ... [A]dditionally, many of the uncial (capital letter) manuscripts contain a predominantly Majority form of text. The Majority form, however, is much less well represented in the Egyptian papyri ... Is it possible that the N/A and UBS editions of the New Testament represent only an approximation to an early form of text that once circulated in Egypt? Where is the evidence that this kind of text really existed elsewhere in the ancient world? ... Perhaps the great numerical superiority of the Majority Text (80% in the minuscule manuscripts) is its own argument for the high antiquity of that text. All other explanations of its majority status lack real plausibility. Indeed, the predominance of this majority can actually be understood as the expected outcome of a normal and natural transmission of the New Testament manuscripts.

== Works ==
=== Thesis ===
- Hodges, Zane C. (1958). The text of Aleph in the apocalypse (Th.M.). Dallas, TX: Dallas Theological Seminary. OCLC 15118258.

=== Books ===
- ——— (1972). The Hungry Inherit: Winning the Wealth of the World to Come. Chicago, IL: Moody Press. ISBN 9780802438003. OCLC 281415.
- ——— (1981). The Gospel under Siege: A Study on Faith and Works. Dallas, TX: Redención Viva. ISBN 9780960757602. OCLC 8491445.
- ——— (1982). Here Walks My Enemy: The Story of Luis. Dallas, TX: Redención Viva. ISBN 9780960757619. OCLC 9441874.
- ———; Farstad, Arthur L. (1982). The Greek New Testament According to the Majority Text with Apparatus. Nashville, TN: Thomas Nelson. ISBN 9780840749635. OCLC 9112450.
- ——— (1985). Grace in Eclipse: A Study on Eternal Rewards. Dallas, TX: Redención Viva. ISBN 9780960757633. OCLC 12754411.
- ——— (1989). Absolutely Free! A Biblical Reply to Lordship Salvation. Dallas, TX & Grand Rapids, MI: Redención Viva & Academie Books. ISBN 9780310519607. OCLC 20016152.
- ———; Radmacher, Earl (1990). The NIV Reconsidered: A Fresh Look at a Popular Translation. Dallas, TX: Redención Viva. ISBN 9780960757695. OCLC 23257988.
- ——— (1992). The Gospel under Siege: Faith and Works in Tension. Dallas, TX: Redención Viva. ISBN 9781879534001. OCLC 26382980. - 2nd edition of the 1981 title.
- ———; Farstad, Arthur L.; et al. (translators) (1993). The NKJV Greek-English Interlinear New Testament: features word studies & New King James parallel text. Nashville, TN: Thomas Nelson. ISBN 9780840783578. OCLC 30043084.
- ——— (1994). The Epistle of James: Proven Character through Testing. Grace New Testament commentary. Irving, TX: Grace Evangelical Society. ISBN 9780964139206. OCLC 30951331.
- ——— (1995). Power to Make War. Dallas, TX: Redención Viva. ISBN 9781879534018. OCLC 34296282.
- ——— (1999). The Epistles of John: Walking in the Light of God's Love. Grace New Testament commentary. Irving, TX: Grace Evangelical Society. ISBN 9780964139244. OCLC 43290576.
- ——— (2001). Harmony with God: A Fresh Look at Repentance. Dallas, TX: Redención Viva. ISBN 9781879534049. OCLC 47806627.
- ——— (2004). Six Secrets of the Christian Life. Dallas, TX: Redención Viva. ISBN 9781879534056. OCLC 57735059.
- ——— (2011). Luke: The Life of Imitating Jesus. Dallas, TX: Victor Street Bible Chapel. ISBN 9780983315414. OCLC 890138884.

=== Posthumous Books ===
- ——— (2010). Hebrews: The Journey of Faith. Dallas, TX: Victor Street Bible Chapel. OCLC 662722386.
- ——— (2011). A Free Grace Primer: The Hungry Inherit, The Gospel under Siege, Grace in Eclipse. Denton, TX: Grace Evangelical Society. ISBN 9780978877392. OCLC 1056818270.
- ——— (2013). Romans: Deliverance from Wrath. Corinth, TX: Grace Evangelical Society. ISBN 9780978877361. OCLC 839304660.
- ——— (2014). The Atonement and Other Writings. Corinth, TX: Grace Evangelical Society. ISBN 9780988347236. OCLC 1031401272.
- ——— (2015). Faith in His Name: Listening to the Gospel of John. Denton, TX: Grace Evangelical Society. ISBN 9781943399048.
- ——— (2015). Second Peter: Shunning Error in Light of the Savior's Return. Denton, TX: Grace Evangelical Society. ISBN 978-0988347281.
- ——— (2016). What is the Outer Darkness?.
- ——— (2016). Power to Stand: An Exposition of Jude.
- ——— (2017). The Journey of Faith: Sermons on Hebrews.
- ——— (2017). Tough Texts: Did Jesus Teach Salvation by Works?.
- ——— (2017). First Peter: The Salvation of the Soul.
- ——— (2017). Spiritual Lessons from the Life of David.

=== Chapters ===
- ——— (1985). "The Epistles of John". In Walvoord, John F.; Zuck, Roy B. (eds.). Bible Knowledge Commentary: An Exposition of the Scriptures. Vol. 2. Wheaton, IL: Victor Books. OCLC 1100193110.
- ——— (1985). "Hebrews". In Walvoord, John F.; Zuck, Roy B. (eds.). Bible Knowledge Commentary: An Exposition of the Scriptures. Vol. 2. Wheaton, IL: Victor Books. pp. 810–ff. OCLC 1100193110.
- ———; Hodges, David M. (2012). "The Implications of Statistical Probability for the History of the Text". In Pickering, Wilbur N. (ed.). The Identity of the New Testament Text III. Nashville, TN: Nelson. pp. 158–164. ISBN 9781620320976. OCLC 828785878.

=== Journal articles ===
- ——— (April–June 1961). "The ecclesiastical text of Revelation: does it exist?". Bibliotheca Sacra. 118: 113–122.
- ——— (April–June 1962). "The critical text and the Alexandrian family of Revelation". Bibliotheca Sacra. 119: 129–138.
- ——— (July–September 1962). "Conflicts in the biblical account of the Ammonite-Syrian war". Bibliotheca Sacra. 119: 238–243.
- ——— (October–December 1962). "The first horseman of the Apocalypse". Bibliotheca Sacra. 119: 324–334.
- ——— (October–December 1963). "Light on James Two from Textual Criticism". Bibliotheca Sacra. 120: 341–350.
- ——— (June 1978). "Modern textual criticism and the majority text: a response". Journal of the Evangelical Theological Society. 21 (2): 143–155.
- "Post-Evangelicalism Confronts the Postmodern Age" (1996, Journal of the Grace Evangelical Society)
- "Legalism: The Real Thing" (1996, Journal of the Grace Evangelical Society)
- "Assurance: of the Essence of Saving Faith" (1997, Journal of the Grace Evangelical Society)
- "Making Your Calling and Election Sure: An Exposition of 2 Peter 1:5-11" (1998, Journal of the Grace Evangelical Society)
- "1 Thessalonians 5:1–11 and the Rapture" (2000, Chafer Theological Seminary Journal)
- "How to Lead People to Christ, Part 1" (2000, Journal of the Grace Evangelical Society)
- "How to Lead People to Christ, Part 2" (2001, Journal of the Grace Evangelical Society)
- "Harmony with God, Part 1" (2002, Chafer Theological Seminary Journal)
- "Harmony with God, Part 2" (2002, Chafer Theological Seminary Journal)
- "Harmony with God, Part 3" (2003, Chafer Theological Seminary Journal)
- "Regeneration: A New Covenant Blessing" (2005, Journal of the Grace Evangelical Society)
- "Justification: A New Covenant Blessing" (2006, Journal of the Grace Evangelical Society)
