= William Jones (Welsh Baptist writer) =

Welsh bookseller and religious writer

- Born: 1762
- Died: 1846 (aged 83–84)
- Occupations: Welsh bookseller, Christian

William Jones (1762–1846) was a Welsh bookseller, religious writer, and member of the Scotch Baptist church in Finsbury, London.

== Life ==
Born at Gresford, the son of William and Mary Jones, he was brought up at Poulton, Cheshire. He started work as an apprentice in Chester in 1780, and encountered a Baptist congregation there. In 1782–83 he moved to London, where he was in the congregation of Abraham Booth, returning to Chester after about a year.

Jones fell under the influence of Archibald McLean, who preached in Chester for some weeks in autumn 1786, and was baptised by him. The congregation joined the Scotch Baptists. He moved to Liverpool as a bookseller in Castle Street, in 1793, buying the business from his brother-in-law, and publishing McLean's work A Defence of Believer-Baptism. At this period he held religious meetings in his home, also perhaps attending those of Samuel Medley. In the late 1790s McLean set up a Liverpool congregation in Lord Street, with John Richard Jones of Ramoth. William Jones was an elder of this church. He ran the Liverpool congregation, from 1800, with David S. Wylie from Paisley.

In 1812 Jones moved to London, working as a bookseller. He was minister, or elder (sources differ) of the church in Windmill Street, Finsbury, for the rest of his life. By the late 1820s, suffering financial troubles, Jones was taking on work writing books for Thomas Tegg. It was the American art student Peyton C. Wyeth who formed Jones's contact with Alexander Campbell in the mid-1830s.

== Works ==
Jones's major works were:

- Life of Abraham Booth, 1808.
- History of the Waldenses, 1812, reissued as History of the Christian Church, 1817 (4th edition, 1819); sometimes assigned in error to William Jones of Nayland.
- Biblical Cyclopædia, 1816.
- Dictionary of Religious Opinions, 1817.
- Christian Biography, 1829.
- Autobiography, edited by his son, 1846.

Jones also edited a series of periodicals: Theological Repository (1800) and Christian Advocate (1809) were from his time in Liverpool. In London there were the New Evangelical Magazine and New Baptist Magazine (the change of title came in 1825, and the magazine was given up in 1826, after the panic of 1825); and The Baptist Miscellany and Particular Baptist Magazine (started in 1827, and running for six years).

In 1829, Jones published lectures on the Apocalypse. The Millennial Harbinger introduced the theories of Alexander Campbell, around 1835. Later Jones broke with Campbell. In general terms Jones published material supporting the Scotch Baptists, and restorationism, and opposed established religion. The publications he edited had a wide circulation in Scotland.

Jones edited the works of Archibald McLean and Samuel Stennett. He wrote biographies of Adam Clarke, Rowland Hill, and Edward Irving.

== Family ==
Jones married Maria or Elizabeth Crane, daughter of Thomas Crane of his congregation in Chester, in 1786.

== Notes ==
Attribution

This article incorporates text from a publication now in the public domain: Lee, Sidney, ed. (1892). "Jones, William (1762-1846)". Dictionary of National Biography. Vol. 30. London: Smith, Elder & Co.
