= Archibald McLean (Baptist minister) =

Scots Baptist minister

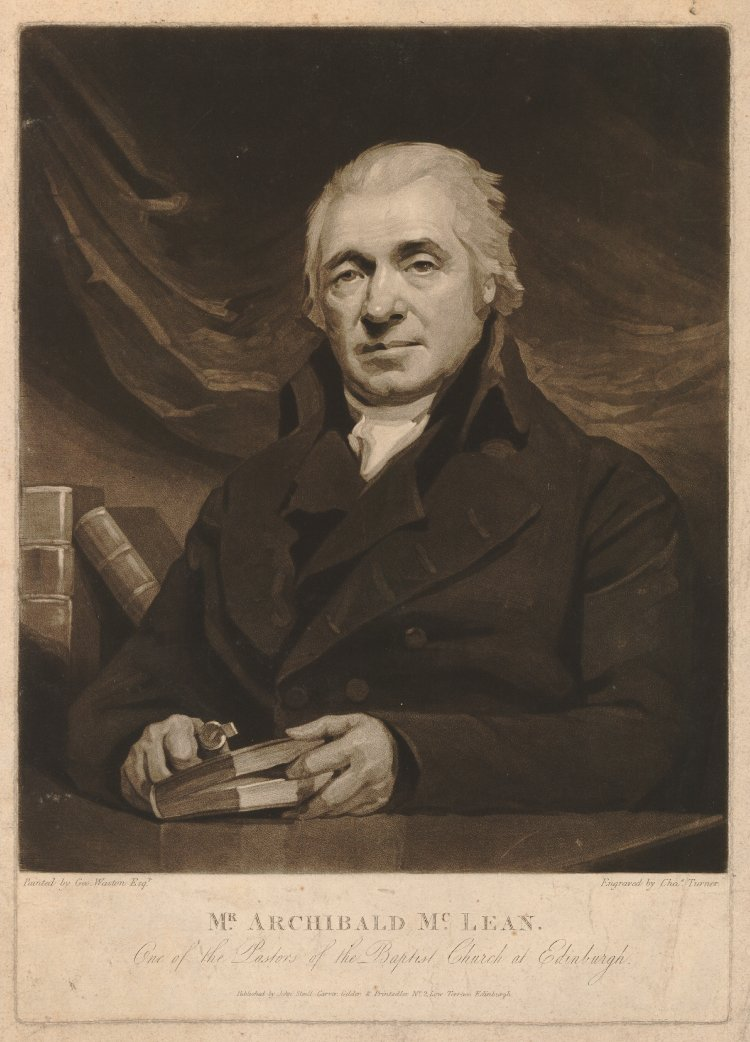
Portrait of Archibald McLean

Archibald McLean (1733–1812) was a Scotch Baptist minister.

== Life ==
Born 1 May (O.S.) 1733, at East Kilbride, Lanarkshire, McLean was the son of a Highlander. As a child he spent time on Mull, where he learned Scottish Gaelic. Sent to school at Cathcart, and then at Cucaddins, he was apprenticed to a printer in Glasgow in 1746.

Marriage allowed McLean to set up as a bookseller and printer in Glasgow; on a matter of conscience he gave up the business seven years later. After a short time in London he acted from 1767 to 1786 as overseer of the printing establishment of Messrs. Donaldson & Co. in Edinburgh.

Brought up a Presbyterian, McLean in 1762 joined the Glasites (Sandemanians). In 1765 he left them for the Baptists, and in June 1768 he was chosen for pastoral office as Robert Carmichael's colleague at Edinburgh. He then toured Scotland and England, set up Scotch Baptist associations, and helped run them. A standard annual journey into England took him to London, Hull, Beverley, Chester, Nottingham, and Liverpool.

McLean died at Edinburgh on 21 December 1812.

== Soteriology ==
McLean, even when being among the eldership of the Scotch Baptists held to a Sandemanian view of salvation. He was a chief opponent of Andrew Fuller, arguing in his book The Commission Given by Jesus Christ to His Apostles Illustrated that Fuller failed to uphold the doctrine of faith alone. McLean argued that faith is only a passive receiving of the gospel, without necessarily including good dispositions or holy affections towards God.

The Sandemanian views held by Archibald McLean have been compared to modern Free Grace theology.

== Works ==
McLean's works included:

- Letters to Mr. Glas in answer to his Dissertation on Infant Baptism, 1767.
- A Defence of Believers' Baptism, 1777.
- The Nature and Import of Baptism, with its Indispensable Obligation. ... To which is added a Short Sketch of the Church Order and Religious Practices of the Baptists in Scotland, Edinburgh, 1786.
- The Commission given by Jesus Christ to His Apostles Illustrated, 1786; translated into Welsh by E. Francis, Carnarvon [1829].
- Essay on the Calls and Invitations of the Gospel, originally published in the Missionary Magazine.
- A Letter on the Sonship of Christ. ... To which is added a Review of Dr. Walker's Defence of the Doctrine of the Trinity and Eternal Sonship of Christ, 1788.
- The Belief of the Gospel-saving Faith, 1791.
- A Dissertation on the Influences of the Holy Spirit, with a Defence of the Doctrine of Original Sin, and a Paraphrase, with Notes, on Romans v. 12 to the end of the Chapter, 1799; translated into Welsh by E. Francis, Carnarvon, 1829.
- A Reply to Mr. Fuller's Appendix to his book on "The Gospel worthy of all Acceptation," particularly to his Doctrine of Antecedent Holiness, and the Nature and Object of Justifying Faith, 1802.
- The Christian Doctrine of Disconformity to the World illustrated and enforced, Liverpool, 1802; first printed in the New Theological Repository.
- Review of Mr. Wardlaw's Lectures on "The Abrahamic Covenant and its Supposed Connection with Infant Baptism", 1807.
- Strictures on the Sentiments of Dr. James Watt and others respecting a Christian Church, the Pastoral Office, and the Right of Private Brethren to Dispense the Lord's Supper, Edinburgh, 1810; translated into Welsh by E. Francis, Carnarvon, 1829.
- A Paraphrase and Commentary on the Epistle to the Hebrews, 2 vols., Edinburgh, 1811–17; 2nd edit., revised, 2 vols., London, 1820.

A collected edition of McLean's works, with a biographical memoir by William Jones, appeared in six volumes, London, 1823. The tenth edition of his Miscellaneous Works was published in seven volumes, Elgin, 1847-8.

== Family ==
In 1759 McLean married Isabella, youngest daughter of William More, a merchant, with whom he obtained a small property.

== Notes ==
Attribution

This article incorporates text from a publication now in the public domain: Lee, Sidney, ed. (1893). "McLean, Archibald". Dictionary of National Biography. Vol. 35. London: Smith, Elder & Co.
