= Abraham Booth =

English dissenting minister and author

Abraham Booth (20 May 1734 – 27 January 1806) was an English dissenting minister and author, known as a Baptist apologetical writer.

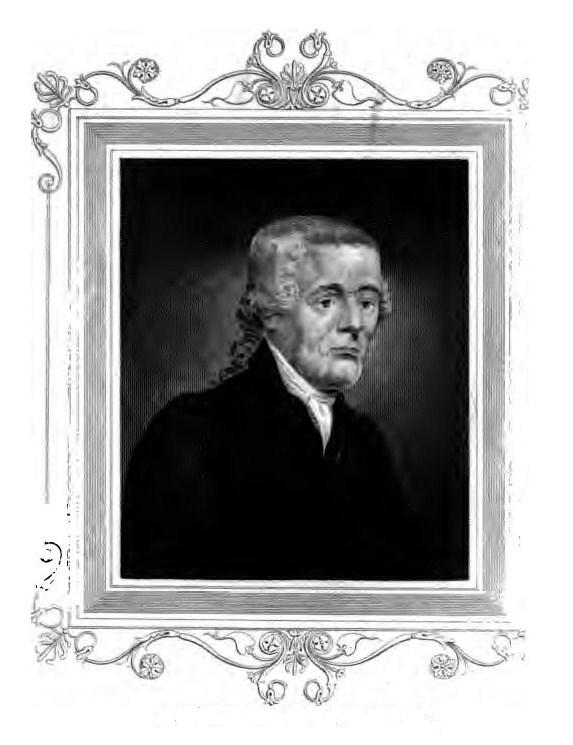
Abraham Booth

== Life ==
Booth was born at Blackwell, near Alfreton, Derbyshire, on 20 May 1734; while he was young, the family moved to Annesley Woodhouse, Nottinghamshire, where his father had taken a small farm as a tenant of the Duke of Portland. The eldest of a large family, Booth worked on the farm to age 15, with sporadic schooling. Then, working on a stocking-frame, he was able to support himself and get some further elementary education. He opened a school at Sutton-in-Ashfield, Nottinghamshire.

Baptist preachers interested Booth in religion, and in 1755 he was baptised by immersion, and began to preach in the Midland counties. In 1760, when the Baptists first gathered into churches, Booth became superintendent of the Kirkby Woodhouse congregation, but not their pastor. He changed views, from General Baptist to Particular Baptist, and seceded. Soon after, he began to preach on Sundays at Sutton-in-Ashfield, Chesterfield, and elsewhere in the Midland towns and villages, still keeping his school.

The Particular Baptist church of Little Prescot Street, Goodman's Fields, in east London, invited Booth to be their pastor. He accepted the call, and was ordained on 16 February 1769. He entered a controversy with Andrew Fuller, over the 1785 book The Gospel Worthy of All Acceptation. In the 1790s Booth preached in the abolitionist cause, and joined the Pennsylvania Abolition Society. The Baptist Education Society was founded around 1804 by Booth and others. It led, in 1810 after his death, to the setting up of Stepney Academy in East London.

Booth died on 27 January 1806, aged 71, having been a minister 50 years. A marble tablet was erected to his memory in the Prescot Street chapel, where he had been pastor 35 years. William Jones's Essay on Abraham Booth was published at Liverpool, 1808.

== Works ==
Booth published The Reign of Grace in 1768. Henry Venn, reading it in manuscript, journeyed to Nottinghamshire to see him, and a lifelong friendship resulted. The preface to the first edition and also to the second edition, 1771, was by Venn; there were nine English, one Edinburgh, and three American editions. In 1770 Booth published The Death of Legal Hope, the Life of Evangelical Obedience, London, as a supplement to The Reign of Grace, against Arminianism and Antinomianism. Other editions followed in 1778 and 1794. These two works were also translated and printed abroad.

In 1777 Booth published a new edition of Jacob Abbadie's work on The Deity of Jesus Christ. In 1778 he published An Apology for the Baptists, a work written to oppose the principle of mixed communion. In 1784 he published Pædobaptism Examined, an answer to the publication by Thomas Robins of an abridgement of a Treatise on Baptism left by Matthew Henry. This book grew to two volumes, 2nd edition, 1787; and was followed by A Defence of Pædobaptism Examined, 1792. In 1796 he published Glad Tidings to Perishing Sinners, which went to four more editions, and in 1805 Pastoral Cautions.

Other works were:

- Essay on the Kingdom of Christ, 1788 (two later English editions and one Boston (US); it was also translated into Welsh, and published at Aberystwyth, 1810).
- Commerce in the Human Species, published by the Abolition Society, 1792.
- The Amen to Social Prayer, 1801, 2nd edition, 1813.
- Divine Justice essential to the Divine Character, 1803.
- Elegy on James Hervey;

and funeral sermons and addresses. Booth also edited several editions of Samuel Wilson's Manual on Baptism. He wrote articles published in the Baptist Magazine for 1809 and 1810. In his last days, when unable to preach, he wrote essays, and two days before his death one on The Origin of Moral Evil; these were published in Posthumous Essays, 1808.

Booth's works were collected and published in three volumes, London, 1813, as The Works of Abraham Booth, excluding his writings on pædobaptism. In 1829 his Pædobaptism Examined was republished in four volumes, by the committee of the Particular Baptist Fund.

== Family ==
On turning 23, Booth married Elizabeth Bowmar, a farmer's daughter. She died four years before him, and he left several children.

== Notes ==
Attribution

This article incorporates text from a publication now in the public domain: Stephen, Leslie, ed. (1886). "Booth, Abraham". Dictionary of National Biography. Vol. 5. London: Smith, Elder & Co.
