= Jakob Abbadie =

French Protestant minister and writer

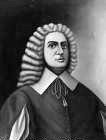
- Jakob Abbadie (1654–1727) Protestant divine and writer
- Born: c. 1654; Nay, Béarn
- Died: 25 September 1727 (aged 72–73); Marylebone, London
- Occupations: Protestant minister, writer

Jakob Abbadie (French: [abadi]; c. 1654 – 25 September 1727), also known as Jacques or James Abbadie, was a French Protestant minister and writer. He became Dean of Killaloe, in Ireland.

== Life ==
Jacques Abbadie was born at Nay, Béarn, probably in 1654, although 1657 and 1658 have been given; he is "most probably the Jacques Abbadie who was the third child of Violente de Fortaner and Pierre Abbadie, baptized on 27 April 1654." Samuel Smiles stated that he was "the scion of a distinguished Béarnese family"; although it is probable that the poverty of his parents would have excluded him from a learned career if some of the leading Protestants of the district had not charged themselves with the expenses of his education, which was begun under M. Jean de la Placette, the minister of Nay, He studied at Puylaurens, the Academy of Saumur, and the Academy of Sedan, receiving the degree of doctor in theology, it is said, at the age of seventeen. An obituary notice, however, which appeared in the Daily Courant for 5 October 1727, says: "He was not above twenty-two when he undertook of himself his admirable treatise on the Truth of the Christian Religion".

About the same time he was sent for by Frederick William, Elector of Brandenburg, to be minister of the French church at Berlin; the electoral summons found Abbadie at Paris, and it was conveyed through the Count d'Espense, who had been commissioned by his master to make the selection. The congregation of refugees, small enough at first to be accommodated in an apartment of the Count d'Espense's residence, grew gradually from increased emigration to Brandenburg, caused by the revocation of the edict of Nantes in 1685. The elector ordered the ancient chapel of his palace to be prepared for the congregation, and the services were frequently attended by the younger members of his family. Abbadie's arrival in Berlin has been variously assigned to the years 1680 and 1681. During seven or eight years he used his increasing favour with the elector to relieve the distress of the refugees from France, and especially from his native province of Béarn. Abbadie continued to occupy his pastorate at Berlin until the death of the great elector, which took place 29 April 1688.

He then accompanied Marshal Schomberg to England in 1688, and the following year became minister of the French Church of the Savoy, London. In the autumn of 1689 he went to Ireland with the marshal.

After the Battle of the Boyne, Abbadie returned to London. He subsequently published a revised version of the French translation of the English liturgy used at this church, with an epistle dedicatory to George I. He was often appointed to deliver occasional discourses, both in London and Dublin, but his lack of facility in English prevented his preferment in England, and also excluded him from the deanery of St. Patrick's, Dublin, to which William III wished to promote him. Abbadie's health suffered from devotion to his duties in the Savoy and from the English climate. He therefore settled in Ireland, and in 1699 the deanery of Killaloe was conferred on him by the king. whose favour he had attracted by a vindication of the Revolution of 1688.

The remainder of Abbadie's life was spent in writing and preaching, and in the performance—not too sedulous, for he was frequently absent from his benefice—of the ordinary duties of his office, varied by visits to England and to Holland, where most of his books were printed. Abbadie visited Holland to see his La Vérité through the press, and stayed more than three years in Amsterdam, 1720–23, during the preparation of Le Triomphe and other works. He returned to Ireland in 1723. Abbadie's income as dean of Killaloe was so small that he could not afford a literary amanuensis; and Hugh Boulter, archbishop of Armagh, having appealed in vain to Lord Carteret, the Lord Lieutenant of Ireland, on Abbadie's behalf, gave him a letter of introduction to Dr. Edmund Gibson, bishop of London, and Abbadie left Ireland. He established himself at Marylebone. He died at his lodgings at Marylebone on Monday, 25 September 1727, aged 73.

== Works ==
Abbadie is best known by his religious treatises, several of which were translated from the original French into other languages and had a wide circulation throughout Europe. The most important of these are Traite de la verité de la religion chrétienne (1684); its continuation, Traité de la divinité de Jesus-Christ (1689); and L'Art de se connaitre soi-meme (1692).

While at Berlin, he made several visits to the Netherlands, in 1684, 1686, and 1688, chiefly for the purpose of superintending the printing of several of his works, including the Traité de la Vérité, Rotterdam, 1684. The book went through a vast number of editions and was translated into several languages, an English version, by Henry Lussan, appearing in 1694. Completed by a third volume, the Traité de la Divinité de Nôtre Seigneur Jésus-Christ, it appeared at Rotterdam, 1689. An English translation, entitled A Sovereign Antidote against Arian Poyson, appeared in London, 1719, and again "revised, corrected, and, in a few places, abridged", by Abraham Booth, under the title of The Deity of Jesus Christ essential to the Christian Religion, 1777. The entire apology for Christianity formed by the three volumes of the Traité, which combated severally the heresies of atheism, deism, and Socinianism, was received with praise. La Vérité de la Religion Chrétienne Réformée (1717) was a controversial treatise which in its four parts attacks the characteristic doctrines of the Roman Catholic Church; it was translated into English, for the use of the Roman Catholics of his diocese of Dromore, by Dr. Ralph Lambert, afterwards bishop of Meath. The work was completed in 1723 in Le Triomphe de la Providence et de la Religion; ou, l'Ouverture des sept Seaux par le Fils de Dieu, où l'on trouvera la première partie de l'Apocalypse clairement expliquée par ce qu'il y a de plus connu dans l'Histoire et de moins contesté dans la Parole de Dieu. Avec une nouvelle et très-sensible Démonstration de la Vérité de la Religion Chrétienne.

It was in the Irish camp with Schomberg that Abbadie commenced one of his most successful works, which was published at Rotterdam in 1692, as L'Art de se connoître soi-même; ou, La Recherche des Sources de la Morale, and went through many editions and amplifications. Translations of this work into other languages include a popular English version by the Rev. Thomas Woodcock, The Art of Knowing One-self, 1694. The last 50 pages of this 274-page work deals with pride, which he divided into five branches: love of esteem, presumptuousness, vanity, ambition and arrogance.

Among the early writings of Abbadie were four Sermons sur divers Textes de l'Ecriture, 1680; Réflexions sur la Présence réelle du Corps de Jésus-Christ dans l'Eucharistie, 1685; and two highly adulatory addresses on persons in high stations, entitled respectively Panégyrique de Monseigneur l'Electeur de Brandebourg, 1684; and Panégyrique de Marie Stuart, Reine d'Angleterre, d'Ecosse, de France, et d'Irlande, de glorieuse et immortelle mémoire, décédée à Kensington le 28 décembre 1694, 1695, also published in England as A Panegyric on our late Sovereign Lady, 1695. These four productions, with other occasional sermons, were in 1760 republished collectively, in three volumes, at Amsterdam, and preceded by an Essai historique sur la Vie et les Ouvrages de M. Abbadie. The pamphlet on the Eucharist was also reprinted at Toulouse, in 1835, under the title of Quatre Lettres sur la Trans-substantiation, and appeared in an English translation, by John W. Hamersley, as the Chemical Change in the Eucharist, 1867.

Défense de la Nation Britannique, 1693 was an elaborate defence of the Glorious Revolution, written in answer to Pierre Bayle's Avis important aux Réfugiés, 1690. He gave a funeral oration on Queen Mary. Abbadie had also written, at the request of the king, Histoire de la dernière Conspiration d'Angleterre, 1696, a history of the conspiracy of 1696, which was reprinted in Holland and translated into English, and for which the Earl of Portland and Secretary Sir William Trumbull placed original documents at the author's disposal. This work helped Abbadie's preferment. After its production, "his majesty sent him to Ireland, with an order to the lords justices to confer upon him some dignity in the church, which order was complied with by his promotion to the deanery of Killalow" (Daily Courant, 5 October 1727).

He revised his works for a complete edition in four volumes, in which were also to be included two unpublished treatises, Nouvelle Manière de prouver l'Immortalité de l'Ame, and Notes sur le Commentaire philosophique de M. Bayle. No trace of them could be found after his death.

== Bibliography ==
- 1684 - Traité de la Vérité
- 1689 - Traité de la Divinité de Nôtre Seigneur Jésus-christ
- 1695 - 'A Panegyric on our late Sovereign Lady
- 1696 - Histoire de la derniere conspiration d'Angleterre, avec le detail de diverses enteprises contre le roy et la nation
- 1717 - La Vérité de la Religion Chrétienne Réformée
- 1719 - Traité de la Divinité de Nôtre Seigneur Jésus-Christ
- 1723 - Le triomphe de la Providence et de la religion ou l'ouverture des sept seaux par le fils de Dieu; ou l'on trouvera la premiere partie de l'Apocalypse ... avec une nouvelle & tres sensible demonstration de la verité de la Religion chretienne
  - Tome premier
  - Tome second
  - Tome troisième
  - Tome quatrième
- 1777 - The Deity of Jesus Christ essential to the Christian Religion
