= In re The Bible Speaks =

In re The Bible Speaks (also cited as Elizabeth Dovydenas vs. The Bible Speaks) is a case involving the legal concept of undue influence as it pertained to a religious charity.

== Facts and Case Resolution ==
Between the years 1984 and 1985, Elizabeth (Betsy) Dovydenas (an American heiress of the Dayton Hudson fortune) donated $6.5 million to The Bible Speaks, a ministry founded by Carl H. Stevens Jr. based in Lenox, Massachusetts. Betsy also changed her will, leaving her estate to the ministry and disinheriting her husband and her children.

But only a year later in 1986, Betsy and her family brought a lawsuit against Stevens and The Bible Speaks, seeking to recover the $6.5 million, on the basis that Stevens had unduly influenced her to make the donations and change her will to leave him her inheritance. They filed the initial lawsuit in Massachusetts state court, but after failing to get the case dismissed, The Bible Speaks filed a petition for Chapter 11 bankruptcy in the bankruptcy court of the District of Massachusetts. As a result, the state lawsuit was automatically stayed and the dispute was adjudicated in federal court. The bankruptcy court ruled in favor of Betsy, allowing her claim against the bankruptcy estate of the church, in 1987. The decision was upheld on appeal by the district court in 1988 and again by the First Circuit Court of Appeals in 1989.

The presiding bankruptcy judge said in his 60-page decision that the testimony revealed "an astonishing saga of clerical deceit, avarice, and subjugation" by Stevens, who "has abused the trust of the claimant as well as the trust of many good and devout members of the church." He described Betsy as intelligent and trusting, but said Stevens achieved "total dominion and control over her."

Jeffrey G. Sherman, a writer for the Brooklyn Law Review, analyzed the meaning of the case in 2008.

After the decision, the bankruptcy trustee sold The Bible Speaks' property in Lenox. Stevens relocated to Baltimore.
