= Neonomianism =

Christian view of Gospel as a new law

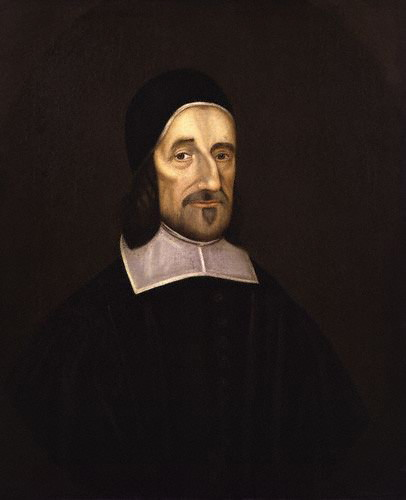
Richard Baxter

Neonomianism in Christian theology is the doctrine that the Gospel is a new law, the requirements of which humanity fulfills by faith and repentance, often including a distinction between initial and final justification, the latter being merited through good deeds. Neonomianism is most often associated with the theology of Richard Baxter (1615–1691) and James Hadow (1667–1747). The theology of Richard Baxter has caused much controversy among Reformed theologians, because his teachings have been seen as opposing justification by faith alone. Neonomianism was significant within the Marrow Controversy.

Richard Baxter defended this view when he wrote,

In our first Believing we take Christ in the Relations of a Saviour, and Teacher, and Lord, to save us from all sin, and to lead us to glory. This therefore importeth that we accordingly submit unto him, in those his Relations, as a necessary means to the obtaining of the benefits of the Relations. Our first faith is our Contract with Christ….And all Contracts of such nature, do impose a necessity of performing what we consent to and promise, in order to the benefits….Covenant-making may admit you, but it's the Covenant-keeping that must continue you in your privileges.

— Richard Baxter, Aphorisms of Justification

William Styles defined Neonomianism as a doctrine associated with the theologian Daniel Williams, "which held that God has receded from the demands of the Moral Law, and given up its original obligations—and that the Gospel is a New Law, but of milder requirements, in which Faith, Repentance, and sincere though imperfect Obedience, are substituted in the room of the perfect and perpetual Obedience required by the original Law." (William Styles, A Manual of Faith and Practice)

Isaac Chauncy (1632–1712) was one of the leading opponents of neonomianism. He set forth his arguments against Williams in his book Neonomianism Unmask'd.

The Neonomian controversy with the Marrow Brethren has been compared to the Lordship salvation controversy.

== See also ==
- Christian views on the old covenant
