= Hyper-Grace theology =

Emphasizes God's grace, downplaying the effects of sin on a Christian

Hyper-Grace, also called the modern grace message, is a soteriological doctrine in Christianity which emphasizes divine grace with eternal security while minimizing obedience to Christ and discipleship. The view has been mostly popularized among certain expressions of Charismatic Christianity. Hyper-Grace has been advocated by Christian teachers such as Joseph Prince and Paul Ellis, among many others. The term "Hyper-Grace" has been given to the view by its critics, however the term has been embraced by some who teach it.

== History ==
Hyper-Grace has mainly arisen out of theologians during the 20th and 21st centuries within the Charismatic movement. The doctrine of Hyper-Grace has caused some controversy within the Charismatic movement. The disagreements between Hyper-Grace theologians and other soteriological views has caused a controversy within Evangelical Christianity. The doctrines of Hyper-Grace have been critiqued by Evangelical authors such as Michael Brown and R. C. Sproul among others.

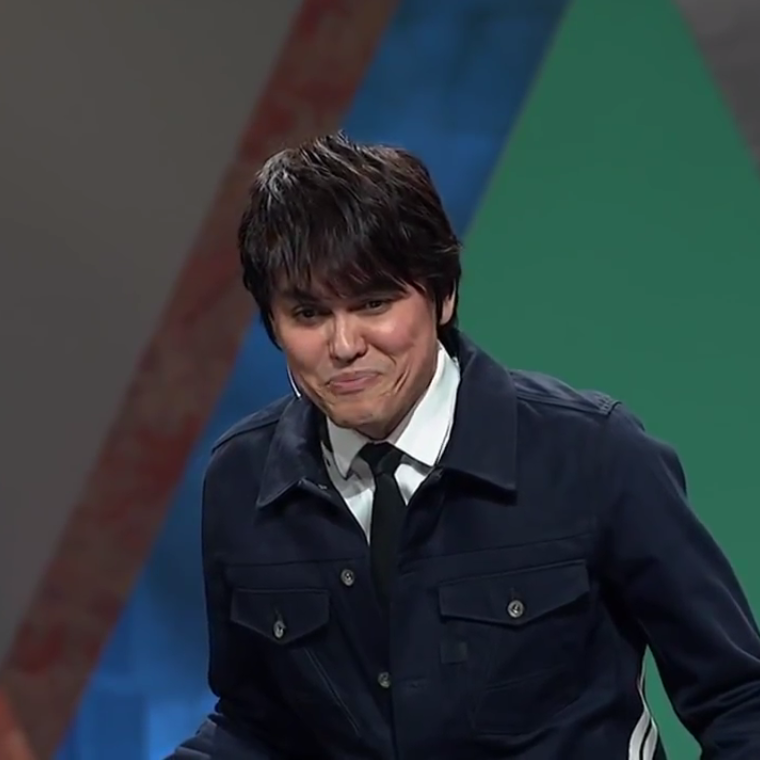
Joseph Prince

More prominent theologians and teachers who have been identified with the movement include:

- Andre Rabe
- Andre van der Merwe
- Andrew Farley
- Andrew Wommack
- Benjamin Dunn
- Brandon Pollard
- Chuck Crisco
- Clark Whitten
- Colin Dye
- D. R. Silva
- Francois du Toit
- Henoch Bosedi
- Jeff Turner
- John Crowder
- John Sheasby
- Joseph Prince
- Michael Reyes
- Mick Mooney
- Paul Ellis
- Rob Bell
- Rob Rufus
- Ryan Rufus
- Simon Yap
- Steve McVey
- Tony Ide

== Theological views ==
Hyper-Grace is characterized by holding to eternal security with a high emphasis on divine grace. Hyper-Grace advocates hold that the believer is not under the Mosaic law in any sense, that one's sinful actions cannot hurt fellowship with God, denies the necessity of regular confession of sin in the life of a believer and holds to the belief that every Christian will have an equal possession in heaven. However, Hyper-Grace advocates reject viewing grace as a "license" to live in disobedience, viewing it as the only way to stay away from sin and emphasizing the natural consequences sin may have. Thus, advocates of the view have argued that grace is the most powerful motivator of obedience. Hyper-Grace rejects the idea of "Lordship Salvation", arguing that it leads to self examination and doubt. Advocates of Hyper-Grace deny that salvific repentance should be viewed as contrition and hatred for sin, instead being a change of mind, thus a synonym for belief in Christ.

Hyper-Grace has been viewed as similar to Free Grace theology, but Hyper-Grace is distinguished by their de-emphasis on the Great Commission to teach obedience to Christ's commands (Matt 28:20) and the commands of Paul and John for sanctification (1 Thess 4:3-4, 1 John 2:2). Free Grace understands confession of sin and obedience as essential for fellowship with God (1 John 1:6–2:4). Also, some Free Grace theologians teach the temporal judgement of a believer for their sins, including physical death.

== See also ==
- Marrow controversy
- Antinomian controversy
- Merit (Christianity)
