= Erich Sauer =

German theologian

Erich Sauer (1898–1959) was a German dispensationalist Christian theologian associated with the Plymouth Brethren. His various books have sold around one million copies.

== Early life ==
Sauer was born in Berlin in 1898, his mother was already a Christian and he attended Open Brethren congregations.

== Theological views ==
Sauer's theology was influenced by the political climate of Germany during the rule of Hitler. Despite the fact that some Nazi periodicals ridiculed the Israel-centered theology of Sauer, he saw Hitler's rise to power as "God's gift of providence" and viewed him as the instrument through which God would bring the Jews to their holy land. Sauer's soteriology has been often associated with Free Grace theology, he argued that although justification is a free gift of grace, the degree of one's glorification depends upon one's good deeds in this life.

Sauer believed in the inerrancy of scripture and dispensational premillennialism.
