= J. Paul Tanner =

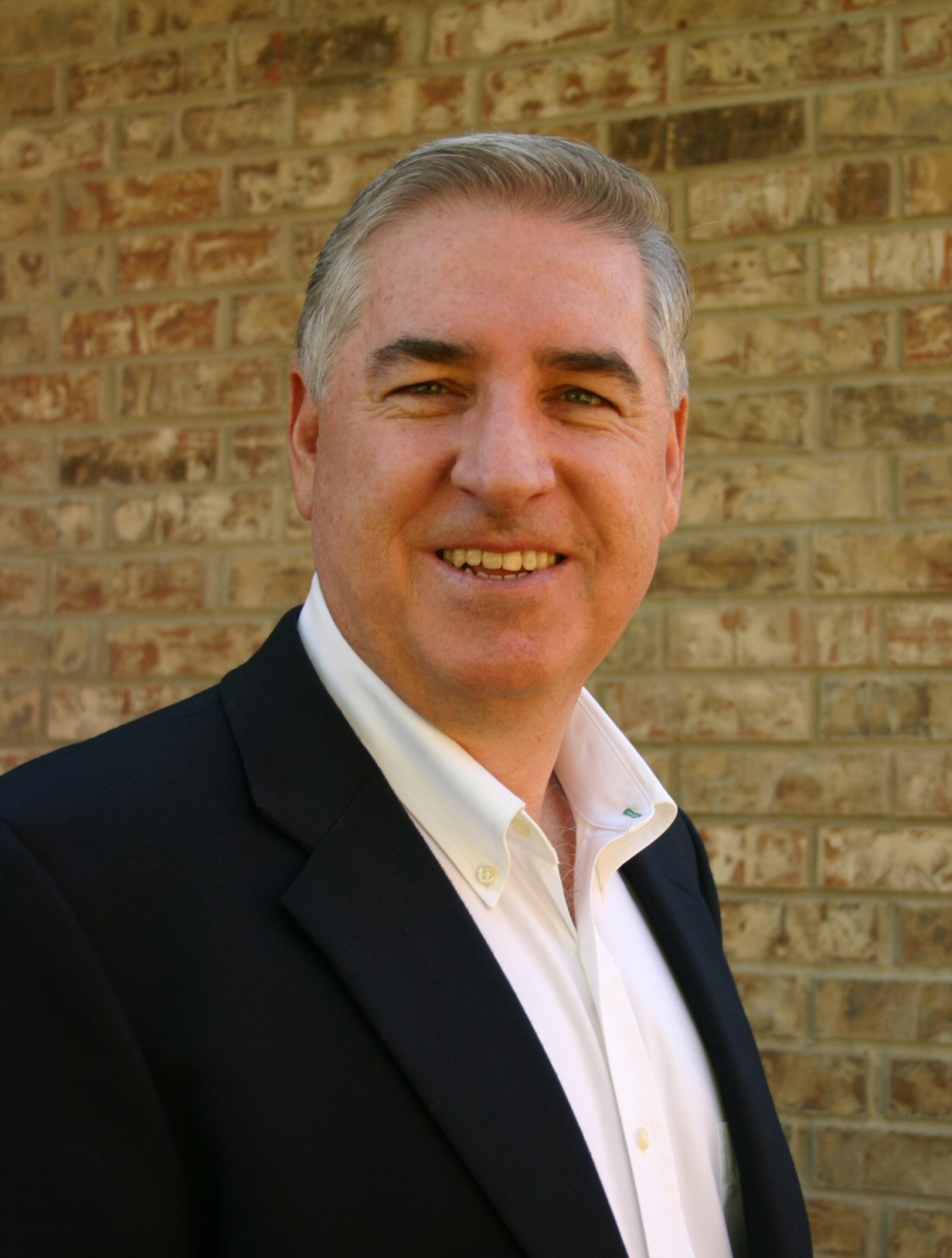
- Born: January 24, 1950 (age 76); Texas, U.S.
- Occupation: Professor

J. Paul Tanner (born January 24, 1950) is the Vice President and Academic Dean of the Arab Center for Biblical Studies and a research professor and writer in the field of Old Testament studies. He has taught on the faculty of the International Graduate School of Leadership (Philippines), East Asia School of Theology (Singapore), Singapore Bible College, and Jordan Evangelical Theological Seminary.

== Educational background ==
Tanner graduated from Abilene High School in 1968, and then with a B.Sc. in Industrial Engineering from Texas Tech University in 1972. Following three years of service in the U.S. Army (1973–1976), he enrolled at Dallas Theological Seminary in Dallas, TX, graduating with honors in 1981 with a Th.M. in Hebrew and Old Testament Studies. After teaching in the Philippines (1983–1985) and in California (1985-1986), he pursued further graduate studies at the University of Texas at Austin, from which he earned a Ph.D. in Middle Eastern Studies with a concentration in Hebrew language and literature in 1990. During his doctoral studies, he received the Foreign Language Area Studies Fellowship (FLAS Fellowship) awarded by the United States Dept. of Education. His doctoral dissertation ("Textual Patterning in Biblical Hebrew Narrative; A Case Study in Judges 6–8") explored the use of ancient Hebrew literary techniques and rhetorical criticism in the field of Old Testament narrative literature.

== Research interests ==
Tanner’s research interests are primarily in Old Testament studies and biblical prophecy, while also writing course material for the Arab Center for Biblical Studies. He is the author of the highly-acclaimed commentary on The Book of Daniel for the Evangelical Exegetical Commentary series (Lexham Press, 2020). In addition, he has written commentaries on The Epistle to the Hebrews and the Book of Revelation. He is the author of The Prophets of Old Testament Israel, as well as The Rapture Promise; Its History and Fulfillment at Christ’s Return. He is currently researching and writing a new book for publication in late 2025, Salvation; The Most Incredible Gift From The Most Magnificent God.

== Publications ==
1992 "The Gideon Narrative as the Focal Point of Judges," Bibliotheca Sacra 149:595 (Apr-Jun 1992): 146–161.

1992 "Daniel's 'King of the North': Do We Owe Russia An Apology?" Journal of the Evangelical Theological Society 35:3 (Sept 1992): 315–28.

1996 "Rethinking Ezekiel's Invasion by Gog," Journal of the Evangelical Theological Society 39:1 (Mar 1996): 29–46.

1997 "The History of Interpretation of the Song of Songs," Bibliotheca Sacra 154:613 (Jan-Mar 1997): 23–46.

1997 "The Message of the Song of Songs," Bibliotheca Sacra 154:614 (Apr-Jun 1997): 142–161.

2000 "Decoding the 'Bible Code'," Bibliotheca Sacra 157:626 (Apr-Jun 2000): 141–159.

2001 "But If It Yields Thorns and Thistles: An Exposition of Hebrews 5:14―6:12, Journal of the Grace Evangelical Society 14:26 (Spring 2001): 19-42.

2002 “Ancient Babylon: From Gradual Demise to Archaeological Rediscovery,” Near East Archaeological Society Bulletin 47 (2002): 11–20.

2003 “The Literary Structure of the Book of Daniel," Bibliotheca Sacra 160:639 (July-Sept 2003): 269–82.

2005 "The New Covenant and Paul’s Quotations from Hosea in Romans 9:25-26," Bibliotheca Sacra 162 (Jan-Mar 2005): 95-110.

2005 "The 'Marriage Supper of the Lamb' in Rev 19:6-10; Implications for the Judgment Seat of Christ," Trinity Journal 26:1 (Spring 2005): 47–68.

2006 “For Whom Does Hebrews 10:26-31 Teach A ‘Punishment Worse Than Death’? Journal of the Grace Evangelical Society 19:37 (Autumn 2006): 57–77.

2009 “Is Daniel’s Seventy-Weeks Prophecy Messianic? Part 1.” Bibliotheca Sacra 166:662 (Apr-Jun 2009): 181–200.

2009 “Is Daniel’s Seventy-Weeks Prophecy Messianic? Part 2.” Bibliotheca Sacra 166:663 (Jul-Sep 2009): 319–35.

2010 "Paul Never Wrote an Autobiography, but Now We Have a Timeline." Bible Study Magazine 2:2 (Jan-Feb 2010): 30–31.

2010 "The Epistle to the Hebrews," in The Grace New Testament Commentary, vol. 2, 1031–1098. Denton, TX: Grace Evangelical Society, 2010.

2011 "Interpreting the Song of Songs," in The Eerdmans Companion to the Bible, ed. Gordon D. Fee and Robert L. Hubbard, Jr. Grand Rapids: Eerdmans, 2011.

2012 "James's Quotation of Amos 9 to Settle the Jerusalem Council Debate in Acts 15." Journal of the Evangelical Theological Society 55:1 (March 2012): 65–85.

2013 "The Cost of Discipleship: Losing One's Life for Jesus' Sake." Journal of the Evangelical Theological Society 56:1 (March 2013): 43–61.

2014 “The 'Outer Darkness' in Matthew's Gospel; Shedding Light on an Ominous Warning." Paper delivered at the SW Regional Conference of the Evangelical Theological Society. March 8, 2014.

2015 “Old Testament Chronology and Its Implications for the Creation and Flood Accounts.” Bibliotheca Sacra 172 (Jan-Mar 2015): 24–44.

2015 “Calculating the Date of Creation and the Flood: A Young-Earth Creationist View.” Grace in Focus 30:1 (Jan-Mar 2015): 20–21.

2015 “Evangelical Views of the Creation Account in Genesis 1-2.” Grace in Focus 30:1 (Jan-Mar 2015): 22–23.

2016 "The Genealogies of Genesis 5 & 11: Reasons for Understanding These as Gapless Chronologies." Paper presented at the annual meeting of the Evangelical Theological Society. San Antonio, TX Nov 17,2016.

2017 "A Proposal for (Future) Apostate Jerusalem's Role in a Progressive Dispensational Eschatology; Another Look at Revelation 17-18." Paper presented at the SW Regional meeting of the Evangelical Theological Society. Fort Worth, TX, Mar 31, 2017.

2017 "The 'Outer Darkness' in Matthew's Gospel; Shedding Light on an Ominous Warning." Bibliotheca Sacra 174 (Oct-Dec 2017): 445-59.

2017 "Hebrews 6:4-6 and the Question of Christian Perseverance: A Case for Christian Rebellion Met by Temporal Judgment and Loss of Reward." In A Defense of Free Grace Theology with Respect to Saving Faith, Perseverance, and Assurance, ed. Fred Chay (Grace Theology Press, 2017), 239-79.

2019 "Daniel 7:13-27; The Glorious Son of Man." In The Moody Dictionary of Messianic Prophecy, ed. Michael Rydelnik and Edwin Blum, 1127-38. Chicago Moody Press, 2019.

2019 "Christ in Daniel: Ramifications of a Closer Look at Daniel 9:26." Paper delivered at the Annual Meeting of the Evangelical Theological Society. Nov 20, 2019.

2020 Daniel. Evangelical Exegetical Commentary, eds. H. Wayne House and William D. Barrick. Bellingham, WA. Lexham Press, 2020.

2022 "The Book of Revelation: The Return of Christ to Reign Victoriously", Independently published, Sep 17, 2022.

2024 "The Rapture Promise; Its History and Fulfillment at Christ’s Return" (A Defense of Post-Tribulationism), Independently published, Feb 16, 2024.

2024 "The Epistle to the Hebrews; Enduring in Faith to Receive a Great Reward", Independently published, Feb 24, 2024.

2024 "The Prophets of Old Testament Israel", Independently published, Jun 10, 2024.

2024 “The Old Testament Background to the 'Day of the LORD' in 2 Peter 3:10." Paper delivered at the Annual Meeting of the Evangelical Theological Society. Nov 20, 2024.
