= Greater Grace World Outreach =

Nondenominational evangelical Christian church in Maryland, US

Coordinates: 39°18′54″N 76°32′33″W

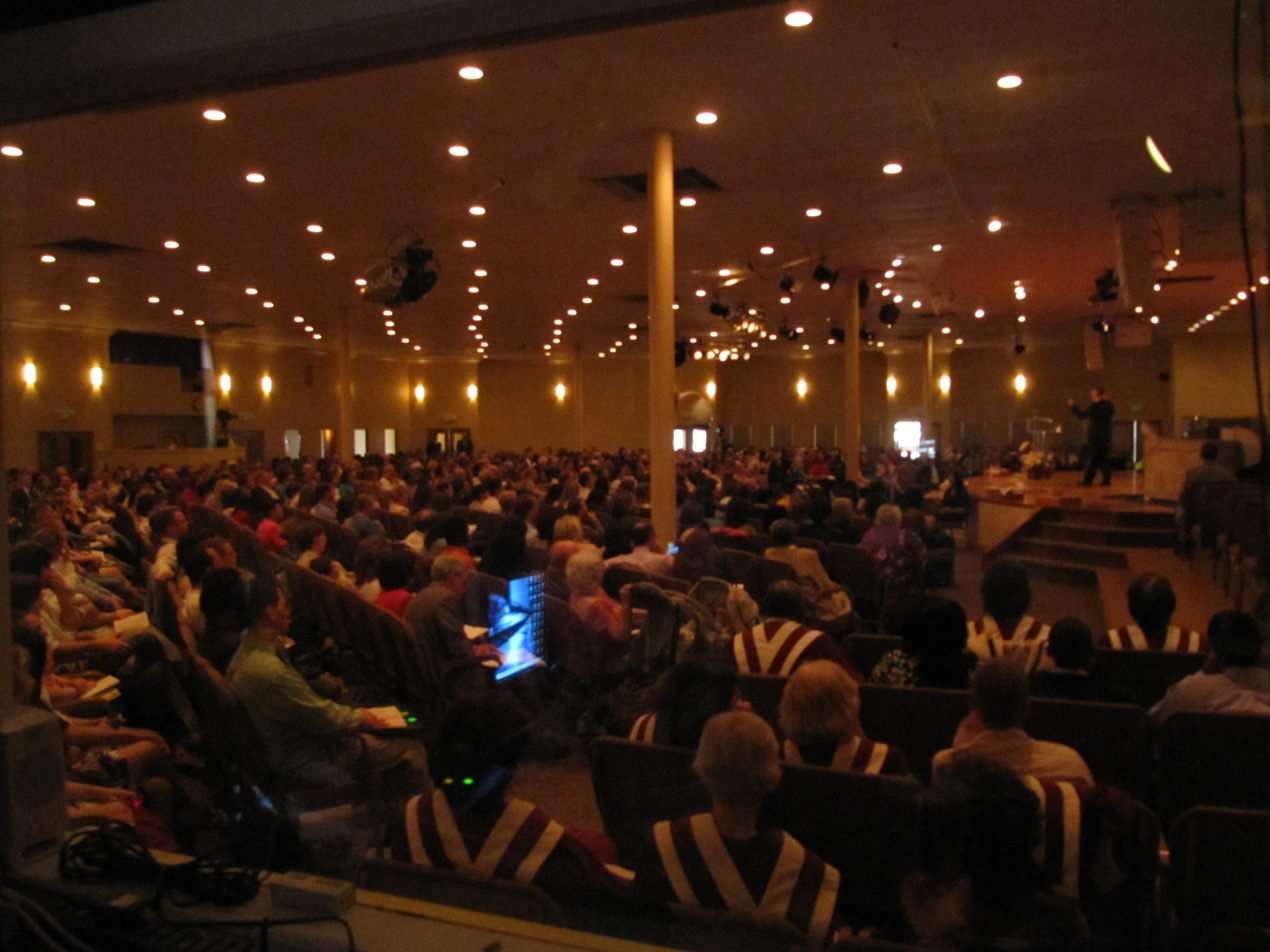
- View of GGWO Sunday morning church service from the AV/IT/WEB studio.
- Classification: Evangelical
- Orientation: Nondenominational
- Leader: Thomas Schaller
- Region: Worldwide
- Founder: Carl H. Stevens Jr.
- Origin: "The Bible Speaks" in 1973, reformed as GGWO in 1987; Baltimore
- Congregations: 550
- Ministers: 1000

Greater Grace World Outreach (GGWO) is a nondenominational evangelical Christian church located in Baltimore, Maryland.

GGWO was founded by Carl H. Stevens Jr. who was succeeded by Pastor Thomas Schaller as Presiding Elder and Overseeing Pastor of Greater Grace World Outreach in Baltimore in April 2005.

GGWO would have a weekly attendance of 1500 in Baltimore and 550 churches throughout the world in 2024. Most of these churches are located in North America, Europe and Africa, with larger congregations in Hungary, Azerbaijan and Ghana. Most of the “pastors” attended the unaccredited affiliated Maryland Bible College & Seminary in Baltimore, however there are many other affiliated Bible colleges around the world. The offerings of Greater Grace also include the radio program Grace Hour, Greater Grace Christian Academy, and Christian Sports Clubs.

== History ==
=== Origins ===
In the early 1960s, Carl H. Stevens Jr., a bakery truck driver, was praying at Wortheley Pond near Peru, Maine, and developed a vision for a worldwide Christian ministry. Stevens was later ordained by a council of independent ministers at the Montsweag Baptist Church on March 7, 1963. From there Stevens went on to minister at the Woolwich-Wiscasset Baptist Church, and establish the Northeast School of the Bible in 1972. He also began to experiment with radio evangelism, with a program called "Telephone Time."

In 1973, following an arson attack on their church building and a controversial church split, Stevens and his closest followers moved the center of their operations to a former Catholic school facility in South Berwick, Maine. There "The Bible Speaks" became the name of the church, and "the Northeast School of the Bible" was renamed as "Stevens School of the Bible". Expanded radio and television outreaches continued to draw in new followers and—both through church planting operations by the organization's Bible school students and graduates, and existing churches affiliating themselves with Stevens' organization—a network of "branch ministries" began to develop.

In 1976, the school grew beyond its capacity. As a result, Carl Stevens moved the "home base" of his organization to a former private boarding school facility which they were able to purchase in Lenox, Massachusetts.

The cornerstone of Stevens' career in Christian broadcasting was the call-in radio show he hosted, originally known as "Telephone Time", now called "Grace Hour".

In both South Berwick and Lenox, the Bible Speaks developed a considerable local presence, not only through drawing large numbers of young adults into these small communities as Bible school students, but also through operating extensive Sunday School operations, with a private fleet of retired school buses for bringing in children from the surrounding area.

They also established a network of private K-12 schools, beginning with Southern Maine Christian Schools in South Berwick (later moved to Scarborough, Maine), and then Stevens Christian Schools in Lenox. Church planting missionary teams were also sent out first to El Salvador and then to Finland and other European countries. In the 1980s this expanded to include church planting operations in South America, Africa, Asia and Australia. Thomas Schaller, the current leader of GGWO, began his pastoral career as the head of their original missionary team to Finland.

In the 1983, the Bible Speaks purchased a Norwegian ferry boat which they renovated to use as a missionary relief vessel in the Caribbean. This boat was named La Gracia, with Baltimore, Maryland as its official home port.

In 1987, "The Bible Speaks" was forced to declare bankruptcy due to a $6 million dollar court case in which the founding pastor was determined to have manipulated and pressured a donor into secretly donating large sums of money.

=== Present organization ===
In 1987, after going bankrupt, the church moved in Baltimore and was renamed Greater Grace World Outreach. It established ministries including the Grace Hour, Greater Grace Christian Academy, Maryland Bible College and Seminary, the Christian Athletics Program, as well as international outreach ministries.

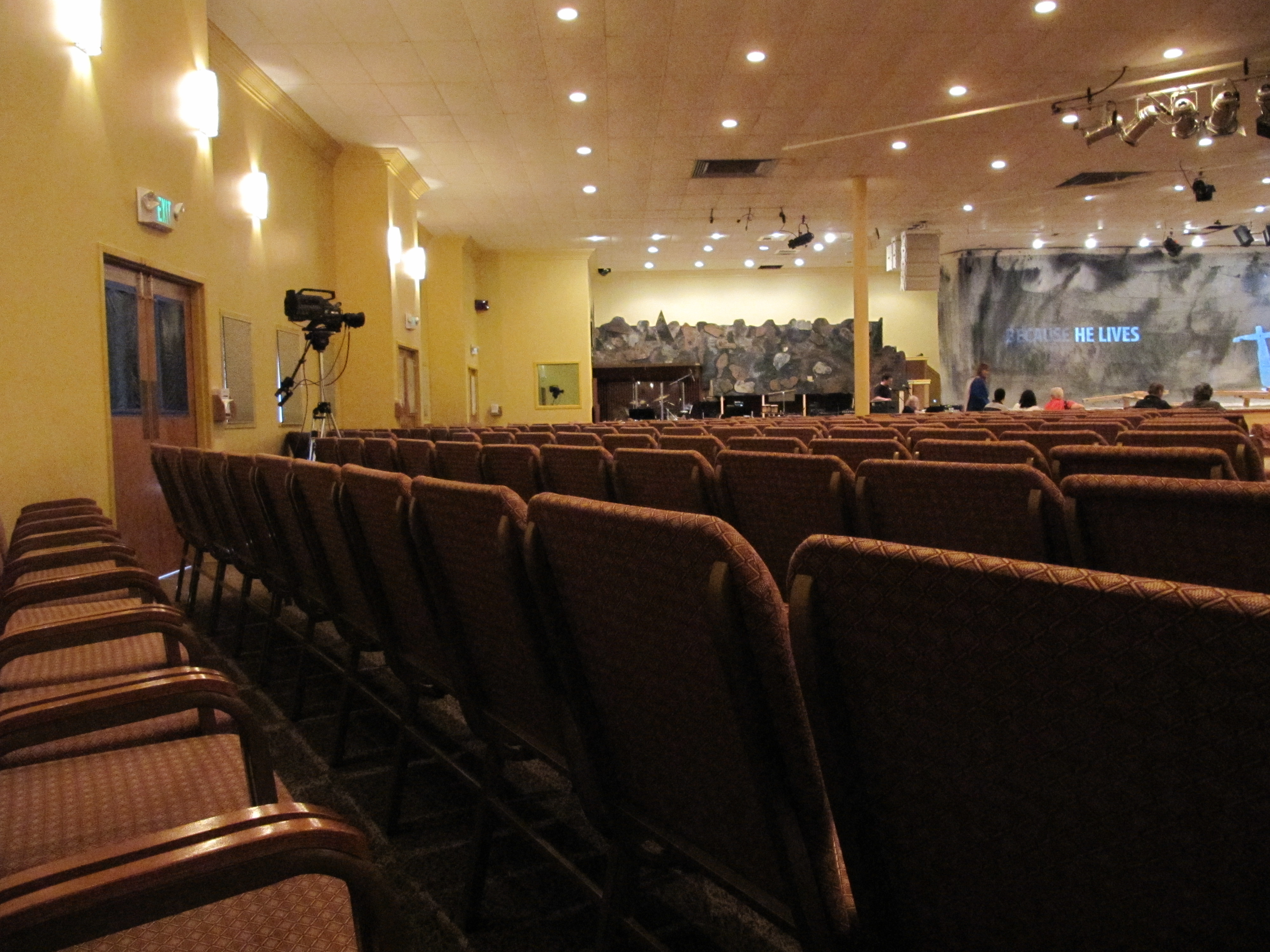
A section of GGWO'S 1,200 seat church auditorium.

In 2003, Carl Stevens became too ill to continue his leadership of GGWO. In 2005, the elders elected Rodger Stenger to become the new chief elder of the church. However, Rodger Stenger chose not to accept the position. In his place the elders elected Thomas Schaller as senior pastor, after a congregational vote. Still, many of the elders and senior pastors were dissatisfied with the choice, citing Schaller's views on the role of the senior pastor. In 2004, many church leaders, associated ministry leaders, and affiliate churches elected to disaffiliate. A group of pastors who disaffiliated formed a new organization known as The International Association of Grace Ministries. GGWO would have 550 churches throughout the world in 2024.

== Beliefs and practices ==
The beliefs of Greater Grace are outlined in its doctrinal statement and detailed in booklets written by Carl H. Stevens. Worship is non-liturgical but is generally structured as follows: (singing), announcements, worship (singing), offering, opening prayer, sermon, closing prayer/benediction/altar call (singing), closing announcements. Songs are usually contemporary, but classical hymns are also sung on account of the wide range of ages among members. An "offering song" is also sung during the taking of the offering, which is often sung by a member of the congregation who is not a regular member of the worship team, or by one of the churches choirs. Evangelism, raps (devotionals, or informal Q&A meetings, usually following sermons, but also held at various times throughout the week, most notably during lunch hour), and informal Bible study are also considered important acts of worship.

The organization has a 10-point Doctrinal Statement available on its website. The organization limits the pastorate and/or homiletic role to men due to a literal interpretation of I Tim. 2:12, but allows women to lead in just about any other capacity. The church leadership is strongly anti-homosexuality and anti-abortion.

== Controversies ==
In 2004, Greater Grace World Outreach has been accused of cult-like behavior. In 2007, a letter was written by the Christian Research Institute, which offers a list of suggestions for the church, attempting to correct any of the false teachings that might exist. The main teaching which was considered a concern was that of delegated authority. However, in this document, Miller concedes that "TBS has, up to the time of this writing, also maintained an orthodox, biblical position on those doctrines most essential to the Christian faith. Thus, we do not consider TBS a non-Christian cult, but rather a Christian ministry." The document concludes with a call to repentance for the egregious sins committed by Stevens and leadership of GGWO. A repentance that has not come in full.

In 2019, 32 people told The Millstones group that they had been sexually assaulted as children by men from the church. 18 other survivors also came forward. Victims and families say church officials have failed to provide satisfactory responses to the complaints.
