= Arthur Pink =

English Calvinist Bible teacher

Arthur W. Pink
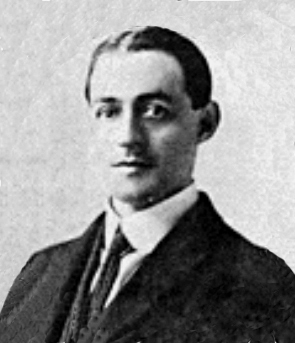
- Arthur Pink
- Born: 1 April 1886; Nottingham, England
- Died: 15 July 1952 (aged 66); Stornoway, Scotland
- Spouse: Vera E. Russell

Arthur Walkington Pink (1 April 1886 – 15 July 1952) was an English Bible teacher who sparked a renewed interest in the exposition of Calvinism or Reformed Theology. Little known in his own lifetime, Pink became "one of the most influential evangelical authors in the second half of the twentieth century."

== Biography ==
Arthur Walkington Pink was born in Nottingham, England, to a corn merchant, a devout non-conformist of uncertain denomination, though probably a Congregationalist. Otherwise, almost nothing is known of Pink's childhood or education except that he had some ability and training in music. As a young man, Pink joined the Theosophical Society, an occult gnostic group in contemporary England, and he apparently rose to enough prominence within its ranks that Annie Besant, its head, offered to admit him to its leadership circle. In 1908 he renounced Theosophy for evangelical Christianity.

Desiring to become a minister but unwilling to attend a liberal theological college in England, Pink very briefly studied at Moody Bible Institute in Chicago in 1910 before taking the pastorate of the Congregational church in Silverton, Colorado. In 1912 Pink left Silverton, probably for California, and then took a joint pastorate of churches in rural Burkesville and Albany, Kentucky. In 1916, he married Vera E. Russell (1893–1962), who had been reared in Bowling Green, Kentucky, and Pink's next pastorate was at Scottsville Baptist Church, Scottsville, Kentucky. Then the newlyweds moved in 1917 to Spartanburg, South Carolina, where Pink became pastor of Northside Baptist Church.

By this time Pink had become acquainted with prominent dispensationalist Fundamentalists, such as Harry Ironside and Arno C. Gaebelein, and his first two books, published in 1917 and 1918, were in agreement with that theological position. Yet Pink's views were changing, and during these years he also wrote the first edition of The Sovereignty of God (1918), which argued that God did not love sinners who had not been predestined unto salvation, and that He had deliberately created "unto damnation" those who would not accept Christ. Whether because of his Calvinistic views, his nearly incredible studiousness, his weakened health, or his lack of sociability, Pink left Spartanburg in 1919 believing that God would "have me give myself to writing." But Pink then seems next to have taught the Bible—with some success—in California for a tent evangelist named Thompson while continuing his intense study of Puritan writings.

In January 1922, Pink published the first issue of Studies in the Scriptures, which by the end of the following year had about a thousand subscribers and which was to occupy most of his time for the remainder of his life and become the source for dozens of books, some arranged from Studies articles after his death. In 1923 Pink suffered a nervous breakdown, and he and his wife lived with friends in Philadelphia until he regained his health. In 1925, the Pinks sailed to Sydney, Australia, where he served as both an evangelist and Bible teacher at the Ashfield Tabernacle. But his impolitic preaching of Calvinist doctrine resulted in a unanimous resolve of the Baptist Fraternal of New South Wales not to endorse him. From 1926 to 1928, Pink served as pastor of two groups of Strict and Particular Baptists.

Returning to England, Pink was invited to preach at a pastorless church in Seaton, Devon; but though he was welcomed by some members, the overseers thought his installation as pastor would split the church. In the spring of 1929, Pink and wife returned to her home state of Kentucky where he intended to become pastor of the Baptist church in Morton's Gap. Once again his hopes were unrealized. To a friend he wrote, "I am more firmly convinced today than I was 14 months ago that our place is on the 'outside of the camp.' That is the place of 'reproach,' of loneliness, and of testing." In 1930 Pink was able to start a Bible class in Glendale, California, while also turning down opportunities to speak in some Fundamentalist churches. The following year, the Pinks rented an unpainted wooden house in Union County, Pennsylvania, where a small group met; then in 1933 they moved to York, Pennsylvania.

Pink decided that if his ministry was to be totally one of writing, he could do that just as well in England. In September 1934 he and his wife moved to Cheltenham, Gloucestershire, near honorary agents of Studies in the Scriptures. Pink seems to have finally given way to despair. To a friend he wrote "that those of my friends who would dearly like to help me are powerless to do so; while those who could, will not. And in a very few years at most it will be too late. What I have gone through the last seven years is so reacting on my physical and mental constitution, that ere long I shall be incapacitated even if doors should be opened unto me. However, I can see nothing else than to attempt to seek grace to bow to the Lord's sovereign pleasure, and say, 'Not my will, but thine be done.'"

In 1936, the Pinks moved to Hove, on the south coast near Brighton. After the death of his father in 1933, Pink received enough of the estate to allow him and his wife to live very simply without financial concerns; and between 1936 until his death in 1952, Pink devoted himself completely to Studies in the Scriptures. Vera believed her husband's almost unrelenting work schedule unhealthy, and she remarkably succeeded in having him take up stamp collecting as a hobby. In 1940, Hove became a regular target of German air raids, and the Pinks moved to Stornoway, Isle of Lewis, Outer Hebrides, Scotland, where they remained for the rest of his life. The island was a bastion of Calvinism, but church services were held mostly in Scots Gaelic, and visitors were not especially welcomed in any case. Pink governed his time in study and writing with "military precision." To a friend he wrote that he went out to shop and get exercise for an hour, six days a week, but that otherwise he never left his study except when working in a small garden. While in Hove, he even published a note in Studies advising subscribers that "it is not convenient for us to receive any visitors, and respectfully ask readers who may visit these parts to kindly refrain from calling upon us, but please note that we are always glad to hear from Christian friends." Rather than attend church, on Sunday mornings, Pink spent time ministering to readers by letter.

In 1951 Vera became aware that Pink was failing. He lost weight and was in pain but refused to take any medicine that might dull his mind and hinder him from completing his work. He died on 15 July 1952. His last words were "The Scriptures explain themselves." Pink left enough written material to allow publication of Studies until December 1953. Vera Pink survived her husband by ten years and after his death made new friends and mingled more freely with others.

== Influence ==
It is alleged that Pink's personality made it difficult for him to have a successful pastoral ministry. He has been criticized for being too individualistic and of too critical a temperament, lacking the benefit of thorough theological discussions with other men of similar gifts. One young pastor, Rev. Robert Harbach who corresponded with Pink for years remembered a very different Pink, who possessed a "pastor's heart." Pink's correspondence with Harbach (until Pink's failing health ended their correspondence in 1949) was warm, heartfelt and fatherly. Early in their correspondence, Pink wrote "I want you to feel perfectly free to call on me for any help I may be able to render you. I am in touch with a number of young pastors, and I deem it part of my work, and a privilege, to offer what advice I can."

Pink's acclaimed contemporary Martyn Lloyd-Jones received spiritual benefit from reading Pink and recommended him to others. To one young minister, he said, "Don't waste your time reading Barth and Brunner. You will get nothing from them to aid you with preaching. Read Pink." But Lloyd-Jones also said, "If I had behaved as Pink did, I would have achieved nothing. Nothing at all… I had to be very patient and take a very long-term look at things. Otherwise I would have been dismissed and whole thing would have been finished." Furthermore, without the assistance and companionship of his wife, who dedicated herself completely to him and his work, Pink would have (as he freely admitted) "been overwhelmed" and probably would have achieved little even in writing.

Theologically Pink was rejected during his lifetime because of his opposition to Arminianism; but after his death, there was a major shift of evangelical opinion towards Calvinistic theology. By 1982, Baker Book House had published 22 of Pink's books and sold 350,000 total copies. Nevertheless, it was Pink's Sovereignty of God that did "more than any other in redirecting the thinking of a younger generation." After Banner of Truth Trust republished it in 1961—modifying it to remove Pink's alleged hyper-Calvinism—the book sold 177,000 copies by 2004. (Note: The Banner of Truth Trust edition has been criticized for omitting nearly half the original work, including three entire chapters.)

== Publications ==
- The Sovereignty of God
- The Attributes of God
- Satan and His Gospel
- Gleanings in Genesis
- Gleanings in Exodus
- Gleanings in Joshua
- Gleanings from Elisha
- Gleanings from Paul
- Practical Christianity
- The Divine Inspiration of the Bible
- Interpretation of the Scriptures
- Profiting from the Word
- The Beatitudes and the Lord's Prayer
- The Seven Sayings of the Saviour on the Cross
- The Doctrine of Salvation
- Eternal Security
- An Exposition of Hebrews Vol 1.
- An Exposition of Hebrews Vol 2.

== Bibliography ==
- Iain Hamish Murray (2004). Arthur W. Pink: His Life and Thought. Banner of Truth. ISBN 0851518834.
- Simplified Chinese version of Iain Hamish Murray (2004). Arthur W. Pink: His Life and Thought. Banner of Truth. ISBN 0851518834. is available here: https://www.ctf-book.org/ctf/pink/
- Richard P. Belcher (1993). Arthur W. Pink – Born to Write. Richbarry Press. ISBN 978-1-883265-01-4.
- Rev. Ronald Hanko (1997). The Forgotten Pink. British Reformed Journal No. 17.
- Rev. Robert Harbach (1994). Letters to a Young Pastor. The Evangelism Committee of the Grandville Protestant Reformed Church.
