= Carl H. Stevens Jr. =

American clergyman and author

Carl H. Stevens Jr. (November 4, 1929 – June 3, 2008) was an American clergyman. He was the founder of Stevens School of the Bible, former Pastor of Greater Grace World Outreach, and Chancellor at Maryland Bible College & Seminary. Stevens was an early pioneer of radio and television evangelism, in his capacity as the host of the Christian radio broadcasts, Telephone Time and The Grace Hour.

Stevens founded a Christian religious group known as "The Bible Speaks." The group was headquartered in Lenox, Massachusetts beginning in 1976. Stevens and his followers moved to Baltimore in 1987 after their property in Lenox was sold following a court decision that required them to return $6.6 million in donations due to undue influence.

Stevens died on June 3, 2008, at the age of 79. Carl Stevens, The Bible Speaks, and Greater Grace World Outreach have been investigated by multiple organizations for cult-like practices including swindling people out of money and spiritual abuse by leadership.
