= Maryland Bible College & Seminary =

College in Baltimore, Maryland, US

Maryland Bible College & Seminary (MBCS)
- Type: Private Bible college
- Established: 1988
- Affiliations: Greater Grace World Outreach
- Students: 300+
- Location: Baltimore, Maryland, United States; 39.31518°N 76.54306°W
- Campus: Urban
- Successor to: Stevens School of the Bible
- Website: http://www.mbcs.edu/

Maryland Bible College & Seminary, founded in 1988, is a Bible college in Baltimore, Maryland, United States. It is a successor to Stevens School of the Bible.

The college is affiliated with Greater Grace World Outreach and was founded by Carl H. Stevens Jr.
