= G. H. Pember =

English theologian and writer (1837–1910)

- Born: George Hawkins Pember; 1837; Hereford, England
- Died: July 1910 (aged 72–73); Budleigh Salterton, England
- Occupations: Theologian, writer

George Hawkins Pember (1837 – July 1910) was an English theologian and author. He was affiliated with the Plymouth Brethren.

== Early life, education and marriages ==
Pember was born in Hereford, the son of George Hawkins Pember (1805–77) and Mary Pember (1804–77). He was educated at Hereford Cathedral School and matriculated from there in 1856. He then enrolled at Gonville and Caius College, Cambridge. He earned the B.A. in his studies in Classics in 1860, and proceeded to postgraduate studies earning an M.A. in 1863. During his postgraduate studies Pember held a teaching post as assistant master at Rossall, Lancashire, from 1861 to 1863. On 14 January 1864 Pember married Mary Lemmon (née Reynolds). She had been previously married to William Lemmon who died in 1861, and she had two daughters from that marriage. She died on 10 July 1891 and left her estate to her husband George Pember. In 1893 Pember married Elizabeth Ann Smith in Devon, and they resided at Westbourne Terrace, Budleigh Salterton, Devon for the remainder of their lives.

== Faith ==
Pember's conversion to Christianity led him to participate in the Brethren, and from within that movement he developed his career as an author and teacher of biblical and theological themes. The Brethren emerged in the 1820s as an independent movement that protested about the ecclesiastical divisions of Protestant churches. Prominent leaders within the Brethren such as Anthony Norris Groves, George Müller and John Nelson Darby were persuaded that there were biblical teachings that were overlooked or not consistently taught by the Protestant churches such as practising adult baptism only (hence rejecting infant baptism), restricting the observance of the Lord's Supper (partaking of the emblems of bread and wine representing Jesus Christ's atoning sacrifice) to baptised members, and biblical prophecies about the imminent return of Christ to the world. As the Brethren placed great emphasis on understanding biblical prophecy they believed that current events could be signs or signals that Christ's second coming would occur very soon. As the Brethren upheld strong convictions about living in the end-times, participant members engaged in what they saw as the urgent task of preaching the gospel to persuade other people to become followers of Christ. The approach that the Brethren developed in understanding biblical prophecy is technically known as Dispensationalism.

== Theological writing ==
Pember's career as a writer appears to have been very financially successful because in successive UK census records his occupation is described as a man of "independent means". The books that he wrote all reflect the distinctive doctrinal themes of the Brethren outlined above. His books The Antichrist, Babylon and the Coming Kingdom, The Great Prophecies of the centuries concerning Israel and the Gentiles, and Mystery Babylon the Great are examples of Brethren interpretations of biblical prophecies in light of current events, and about the rejection of divisions in the Protestant churches. His book The Lord's Command is a classic example of Brethren arguments that uphold the need for only adults (believer's baptism) to be baptised and the rejection of the practice of infant baptism.

His book Earth's Earliest Ages, which went through several editions, had two principal objectives. Pember wrote in the preface to the first edition: "To remove some of the Geological and other difficulties usually associated with the commencing chapters of Genesis" and "to show the characteristic features of the Days of Noah were reappearing in Christendom, and therefore, that the Days of the Son of Man could not be far distant."

In this book Pember attempted to reconcile the Genesis account of the world's creation with the emerging fossil evidence in geological science about the age of the Earth. Pember argued a position known as "The Gap Theory", and which had been previously proposed by the Scottish theologian Thomas Chalmers (1780–1847). In this theory, God originally created the universe but due to the rebellion of some angels led by Lucifer (or Satan) the Earth descended into chaos and life was destroyed. Pember's position was that the first chapter of Genesis gave an account of God restoring or recreating the world after the collapse of the original creation. So proponents of the Gap Theory like Pember propose that a "gap" exists between the first two verses in Genesis chapter one which allows for all the extra time needed to include the ancient fossil and geological evidences. The geological fossils were creatures that lived in the original creation and were destroyed when Lucifer fell into sin. The biblical story of Adam and Eve is about a later recreation of the world. Pember's argument for the "Gap Theory" is an example of how some evangelical Christians in the nineteenth century tried to reconcile geological evidence for an old Earth with the book of Genesis and without embracing Charles Darwin's theory about the evolution of the species.

The other major feature of Pember's Earth's Earliest Ages was his argument that the emergence of rival non-Christian religious groups were evidence that end times biblical prophecies were being fulfilled. Three particular religious movements were pinpointed as being examples of the spiritual deception that are characteristic of the biblical signs of the end times: the Spiritualist churches, the Theosophical Society, and Buddhism. Pember criticised these three movements on the grounds that their teachings were contradicted by the Bible. These religious groups were classified by Pember as modern-day heresies. Pember's interpretation of the Spiritualist churches and of the Theosophical Society as prophetic signs of anti-Christian spiritual deception represents a nineteenth-century style of argument that has been subsequently developed and refined in Christian Countercult literature. As Pember's book defends the creation account of Genesis and rejects Darwinian evolutionary theory it is a work of Christian apologetics, and the latter part of the book is an early example of that genre of literature produced in evangelical Countercult apologetics.

== Animal welfare and animal rights ==
Pember also wrote very briefly about a Christian approach to animal welfare and animal rights, which was becoming a topic of great social concern in Victorian society. What Pember had to say on the subject can be understood on a wide historical canvas. In the seventeenth and eighteenth centuries human attitudes about the status of animals began to change as theologians and philosophers discussed whether animals were capable of rational thought, had emotions, had a soul, and questions about brutal treatment were also debated. Some theologians began to examine passages of the Bible concerned with the afterlife and the prophesied new heaven and new earth, and as those discussions developed Nathaniel Homes (1654) and Stephen Charnock (1660) argued that animals would be included in the resurrection of the dead. In the eighteenth century the debate was carried forward by both the Anglican Bishop Joseph Butler in his Analogy of Religion and the Anglican priest and hymn writer Augustus Montague Toplady, both believed in the resurrection of animals, while Toplady regarded brutality towards animals as sin. Other important contributors to the debate were Humphry Primatt (1776), Richard Dean (1767) and John Wesley as they each addressed the problem of brutality to animals in connection with the problem of evil and sin, while both Dean and Wesley held to the resurrection of animals.

Before Pember wrote about animal rights there had already been many Christians in England involved in protesting against the maltreatment of domestic animals, agitating for legislation against cruelty to animals, and in rejecting the practice of the scientific dissection of living animals called vivisection. An early but failed attempt to pass a Bill against cruelty to animals was initiated by Thomas Erskine (1750–1823). He was a Christian who served in the House of Lords and was also Lord Chancellor in England. In 1809 Erskine "introduced into the Lords a Bill for the prevention of malicious and wanton cruelty to animals". Although Erskine's bill was rejected in the House of Commons, a later legislative attempt to punish acts of cruelty to animals was successfully passed by England's parliament in 1822. The architect of that 1822 legislation was the Irish Christian politician Richard Martin. Two years after the passage of Martin's anti-cruelty legislation, a meeting was called on 16 June 1824 for the formation of an organisation to oppose animal cruelty. With the exception of Lewis Gompertz who was a Jew, everyone else who attended the meeting were professing Christians and a new organisation was founded. The principal founding figures were Rev. Arthur Broome, William Wilberforce, Richard Martin and Thomas Fowell Buxton, and the organisation they created became the Royal Society for the Prevention of Cruelty to Animals in England. Alongside the activities of organisations like the RSPCA, there was a steady stream of books where Christians argued for animal welfare and animal rights, and most writers linked animal rights to theological topics such as whether animals have a soul, that brutality is sin, and if they will be included in the general resurrection of the dead.

So, it is within that context of Christian thought about animals that Pember contributed a short book Animals: Their Past and Present. He examines the spiritual status of animals in the Bible and explores the duties that humans have towards animals. He argues that humans are made in God's image and likeness and have been given authority by God to rule over the animals (sometimes called dominion). Due to Adam's sin all animals live under the curse. Pember argued that on the basis of several biblical passages in Isaiah 11:6–9, 2 Peter 3 and the book of Revelation that some species of animals will be restored or resurrected to live on the new earth foreshadowed in those biblical books. The nature of animals will be changed so they will no longer be predators, and they will have the capacity for speech. Pember argued that as animals will share in the prophesied new earth that in the present life humans must cease being apathetic about the plight of animals. Humans have responsibilities and duties of care towards animals. Pember's argument about a biblical approach to animal rights as seen from the standpoint of end times prophecy was by no means unique, as some of his Christian contemporaries such as Lutheran authors George N. H. Peters (The Theocratic Kingdom) and Joseph A. Seiss also argued similar points. Likewise, elements of Pember's arguments against brutality to animals had already been anticipated by Christian writers in the previous two hundred years.

== Death ==
Pember died in July 1910 aged 73 at Budleigh Salterton in Devon.

== Bibliography ==
- Animals: Their Past and Future, London: Hodder & Stoughton, 1883.
- The Antichrist Babylon and the Coming of the Kingdom, London: Hodder & Stoughton, 1886.
- The Great Prophecies Concerning the Gentiles, the Jews, and the Church of God, London: Hodder & Stoughton, 1887.
- The Great Prophecies of the Centuries Concerning Israel and the Gentiles 6th ed. London: Hodder & Stoughton, 1909.
- The Lord’s Command. A few words on baptism in the form of a reply to a pamphlet entitled "Baptism: pouring on or dipping in?" London: Hodder & Stoughton, 1904.
- Mystery Babylon the Great and The Mysteries and Catholicism : an exposition of Revelation 17 and 18 and An Account of the Rise of the Roman Catholic Church under Pagan InfluencesLondon: Oliphants, 1942.
- Earth Earliest's Ages, and Their Connection with Modern Spiritualism and Theosophy, London: Hodder & Stoughton, 1876.
- The Church the Churches and the Mysteries, of Revelation and Corruption, London: Hodder & Stoughton, 1901.
