= Everett F. Harrison =

Everett Falconer Harrison
- Born: July 2, 1902; Skagway, Alaska
- Died: February 10, 1999 (aged 96)
- Citizenship: American
- Occupation: Professor
- Spouse: Arline Marie Prichard

Academic background
- Education: University of Washington (BA); Bible Institute of Los Angeles; Princeton University (AM); Princeton Theological Seminary (Th.B.)
- Alma mater: Dallas Theological Seminary (Th.D.); University of Pennsylvania (Ph.D.)
- Theses: The Christian Doctrine of Resurrection (1938); The Use of Doxa in Greek Literature with Special Reference to the New Testament (1950)
- Doctoral advisor: Morton Scott Enslin

Academic work
- Discipline: Theology
- Sub-discipline: New Testament Greek
- School or tradition: Dispensationalism; Neo-Evangelicalism
- Institutions: Dallas Theological Seminary; Fuller Theological Seminary

Everett Falconer Harrison (July 2, 1902 – February 10, 1999) was an American theologian.

== Early life and education ==
Harrison was born on July 2, 1902, in Skagway, Alaska to Presbyterian missionaries Reverend Norman Baldwin and Emma Harrison. His father Norman served as pastor of Skagway Presbyterian Church and later on the faculty of Dallas Theological Seminary. He attended the University of Washington (BA, 1923) and then Princeton University (AM, 1927) and Princeton Theological Seminary (Th.B, 1927) where he studied under J. Gresham Machen. Harrison was also ordained as a Presbyterian minister in 1927. He received two doctorates: Th.D. from Dallas Theological Seminary in 1938 and a Ph.D. from the University of Pennsylvania in 1950.

== Neo-Evangelicalism and Founding Fuller ==
Although Harrison served on the faculty of Dallas Theological Seminary from 1928–1939 and 1944–1947, he became an important figure in the Neo-Evangelical movement of the mid 20th Century. Harrison was an important figure involved in rejecting J. Gresham Machen's call to leave the Presbyterian Church, and had an on/off relationship with the Dallas Theological Seminary and its President Lewis Chafer, due to Chafer's fundamentalist view of dispensationalism.

Harrison was pastor at the Third Presbyterian Church in Chester, Pennsylvania, from 1940 to 1944.

In 1947, Harrison accepted Charles Fuller's invitation to become a charter faculty member of Fuller Theological Seminary, and remained there until his retirement in 1980. Harrison was also one of the founding signers of the National Association of Evangelicals.
