= Roy B. Zuck =

Christian educator and author (1932–2013)

Roy B. Zuck (born January 20, 1932, Phoenix, Arizona – March 16, 2013) was a Christian theologian, educator and author. He served as the editor of the theological journal Bibliotheca Sacra from 1986 to 2013.

== Early life and education ==
Zuck was born January 20, 1932, and raised in Phoenix, Arizona. He had a Bachelor of Arts from Biola University in California, and a Th.M. from Dallas Theological Seminary in Texas (1957). He also earned a Doctor of Theology degree from Dallas in 1961. Subsequently, he attended Northern Illinois University and North Texas State University in the 1970s.

== Career ==
Zuck was listed in Outstanding Young Men in America (1965), National Register of Prominent Americans (1987), Who's Who in Texas Today (1987), Who's Who in American Education (1991–92), Who's Who in the South and Southwest (1992), National Directory of Distinguished Leadership (1994), and Who's Who Among American Teachers (2000). In 1970, Zuck was named the Alumnus of the Year at Biola University. He has also been a member of the Board of Directors of TEAM, The Evangelical Alliance Mission (1968–95, 1996–99).

== Death ==
Zuck died on March 16, 2013, at age 81. He was married to a wife who predeceased him, and he was father to two children.
