= Jordan Evangelical Theological Seminary =

Theological seminary in Amman, Jordan

- Established: 1991
- President: Imad Shehadeh
- Location: Amman, Jordan; 31.9747°N 35.7903°E
- Website: www.jets.edu

Jordan Evangelical Theological Seminary (JETS) is a theological seminary in Amman, Jordan. It was founded in 1991 by Imad Shehadeh, who continues to serve as President. It is accredited by the Asia Theological Association, and offers Bachelor of Theology, Master of Arts in Biblical Studies, Master of Divinity, and Master of Theology degrees.
