= Woodrow M. Kroll =

American evangelical preacher and radio host (born 1944)

Woodrow Kroll
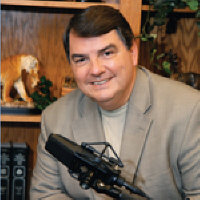
- Born: October 21, 1944 (age 81); Ellwood City, Pennsylvania, U.S.
- Education: Th. D., Th. M, Geneva-St. Albans Theological Seminary; M. Div, Gordon-Conwell Theological Seminary
- Spouse: Linda Piper
- Children: Tracy, Timothy, Tina, and Tiffany
- Parent(s): Frank and Betty Kroll
- Congregations served: First Baptist Church in Middleboro, Massachusetts; Back to the Bible daily radio program (1990–2013)
- Offices held: President of Practical Bible College (now Davis College), 1981-1990

Woodrow Michael Kroll (born October 21, 1944) is an evangelical preacher and radio host. He was the president and Bible teacher for the international Back to the Bible radio and television ministry. He was president of Davis College (formerly Practical Bible College) in Johnson City, New York, United States.

In addition to preaching and teaching, Kroll is a prolific writer, having authored more than 50 books expounding on the Bible and Christian living.

== Background and education ==
Kroll was born to Frank and Betty Kroll in Ellwood City, Pennsylvania. His father, Reverend Frank Kroll, attended Practical Bible Training School (as it was then called) from 1936 to 1939 and pastored the Park Gate Baptist Church in Ellwood City for thirty-three years. Kroll followed in his father's footsteps and attended Practical Bible Training School from 1962 to 1965.

Kroll earned a Bachelor of Arts degree in 1967 from Barrington College. He then studied at Gordon-Conwell Theological Seminary, earning a Master of Divinity degree in 1970. He earned the Master of Theology and Doctor of Theology degrees from Geneva-St. Albans Theological Seminary. Kroll did post-graduate studies at Harvard Divinity School, Princeton Theological Seminary, the University of Virginia, and the University of Strasbourg in France.

He is married to the former Linda Piper. Their son Timothy has followed his father and grandfather in ministry and is the senior pastor at Northside Baptist Church in St. Petersburg, Florida since 2005.

== Ministry and teaching career ==
Kroll began his ministry as the pastor of First Baptist Church in Middleboro, Massachusetts (1968–1970). He then taught at Practical Bible Training School (now Davis College) 1971–1973. From 1975 to 1980, he chaired the Division of Religion at Liberty University in Lynchburg, Virginia. On January 17, 1981, Kroll was inaugurated as president of Practical Bible Training School, also teaching Bible and preaching while serving as president.

During Kroll's presidency, the school obtained accreditation from the Transnational Association of Christian Colleges and Schools (TRACS) and the American Association of Bible Colleges (AABC, now the Association for Biblical Higher Education). He also developed the administration, curriculum, and much of the school's structure as it exists today, now as Davis College. Kroll resigned on April 27, 1990, to become president and Senior Bible Teacher of the Back to the Bible international radio ministry.

== Back to the Bible ==
Begun in 1939 by Theodore Epp on radio station KFOR (AM) in Lincoln, Nebraska, the Back to the Bible broadcast became a worldwide ministry by the time its founder retired in 1981. Epp was succeeded by Warren W. Wiersbe, former pastor of Moody Church in Chicago, Illinois, who served as leader of the Lincoln, Nebraska-based ministry between 1981–1989. Dr. Kroll was inaugurated in 1990 as the third president of Back to the Bible, the position he held until 2013. During his 23 years of service to Back to the Bible the ministry outreach grew. At the time of his retirement, Woodrow Kroll was heard daily on 1250 radio stations in the United States and anywhere in the world the English language was spoken.

== The HELIOS Projects ==
Upon retirement from radio, Woodrow Kroll founded a ministry that gave an outlet for his 50 years of teaching and ministry experience. WKMinistries launched The HELIOS Projects in 2014. Each project was written and recorded personally by Dr. Kroll. The first project is HELIOS CT "'Talking Thru the Christian Faith'". In 199 sessions, each 20–22 minutes long, Kroll uses a conversational style as if he were sitting across an imaginary table to guide the listener into knowing what Christians believe and why they believe it. In HELIOS GS "Telling God's Story" he retells 372 stories from the Bible, drawing out spiritual insights and practical lessons from each. HELIOS FF "Foundations of the Faith" is a more remedial approach to understanding what Christians believe for those who may not yet be literate. Using either a USB, an app, print, or a solar-powered handheld device, The HELIOS Projects are designed to put A Bible and Christian faith education right in your hand.

== Books authored by Kroll ==
Among the more than 50 books Kroll has written on the Bible and Christian living are:

- Facing Your Final Job Review: The Judgment Seat of Christ, Salvation, and Eternal Rewards. Crossway Books. 2008. ISBN 978-1-58134-973-3.
- Taking Back the Good Book: How America Forgot the Bible and Why It Matters to You. Crossway Books. 2007. ISBN 978-1-58134-826-2.
- Ephesians: Life in God's Family. Crossway Books. 2007. ISBN 978-1-58134-881-1.
- Proverbs: The Pursuit of God's Wisdom. Crossway Books. 2007. ISBN 978-1-58134-879-8.
- John: Face-to-Face with Jesus. Crossway Books. 2007. ISBN 978-1-58134-880-4.
- Places in the Bible: Encounter 125 Cities, Villages, and 'Ordinary' Places. J. Countryman. 2005. ISBN 1-4041-0174-8.
- People in the Bible: Encounter 125 Heroes, Villains & 'Ordinary' Souls. J. Countryman. 2004. ISBN 1-4041-0145-4.
- An Interview with God. Moody Publishers. 2004. ISBN 0-8024-1622-5.
- How to Find God in the Bible. Multnomah Publishers. 2004. ISBN 1-59052-256-7.
- The Vanishing Ministry in the 21st Century: Calling a New Generation to Lifetime Service. Kregel. 2002. ISBN 0-8254-3063-1.
- Read your Bible One Book at a Time: A Refreshing Way to Read God's Word with New Insight and Meaning. Regal Books. 2002. ISBN 0-8307-3478-3.
- Building a Godly Home: God's Blueprint for Men. Back to the Bible. 2001. ISBN 0-8474-1461-2. (Formerly: Is There a Man in the House?)
- Surviving the Prodigals in your Life: Stories of Courage and Hope. Back to the Bible. 2001. ISBN 0-8474-1280-6.
- 7 Secrets to Spiritual Success. Multnomah Publishers. 2000. ISBN 1-57673-664-4.
- FaithWalk: A Daily Journey Through the Bible. Back to the Bible. 2000. ISBN 0-8474-0702-0.
- Hope Grows in Winter: Inspiring Real-Life Stories of How Hope Changes Lives. Kregel Publications. 2000. ISBN 0-8254-3062-3.
- Prime of Your Life: A Guide for Fifty and Beyond. Fleming H. Revell. 1999. ISBN 0-8007-5704-1.
- Jesus Shall Reign: Revelation Simply Explained. Ambassador. 1998. ISBN 1-84030-020-5.
- The I AM God. Back to the Bible. 1998. ISBN 0-8474-1471-X.
- Ten Pearls of Wisdom from Ecclesiastes. Back to the Bible. 1998. ISBN 0-8474-0695-4.
- Little People, Big God. Back to the Bible. 1998. ISBN 0-8474-1472-8.
- When God Doesn't Answer: Removing Roadblocks to Answered Prayer. Baker Books. 1997. ISBN 0-8010-5726-4.
- Proverbs: God's Guide for Life's Choices. Back to the Bible. 1996. ISBN 0-8474-1467-1.
- Struggling with Selfishness: Choosing to Look Beyond Yourself to the Heart of the Master. Back to the Bible. 1996. ISBN 0-8474-1470-1.
- The Joy of Belonging: Discovering Who You Are in Christ. Back to the Bible. 1996. ISBN 0-8474-1468-X.
- Prodigal People: Coming Home to Right Relationships. Kregel Publications. 1995. ISBN 0-8254-3050-X.
- Empowered to Pray: Ten Great Prayers of the Bible Reveal the Secrets of Praying With Power. Baker Books. 1995. ISBN 0-8010-5233-5.
- Journey Into Life: A Study on Romans. Back to the Bible. 1995. ISBN 0-8474-1465-5.
- The Twelve Voices of Easter. Back to the Bible. 1995. ISBN 0-8474-1460-4.
- The Twelve Voices of Christmas. Back to the Bible. 1995. ISBN 0-8474-1457-4.
- Early in the Morning: Devotions for Early Risers. Loizeaux Bros. 1994. ISBN 0-87213-476-8.
- Bible Country: A Journey Through the Holy Land. Back to the Bible. 1992. ISBN 0-8474-1455-8.
- Tested by Fire. Loizeaux Bros. 1991. ISBN 0-87213-475-X. (Formerly: It Will Be Worth It All)
- Prescription for Preaching. Baker Book House. 1980. ISBN 0-8010-5409-5.
- Revelation Made Plain. Christian Jew Foundation. 1974. ASIN B00071UU70.
