= KGBI-FM =

Contemporary Christian music radio station in Omaha

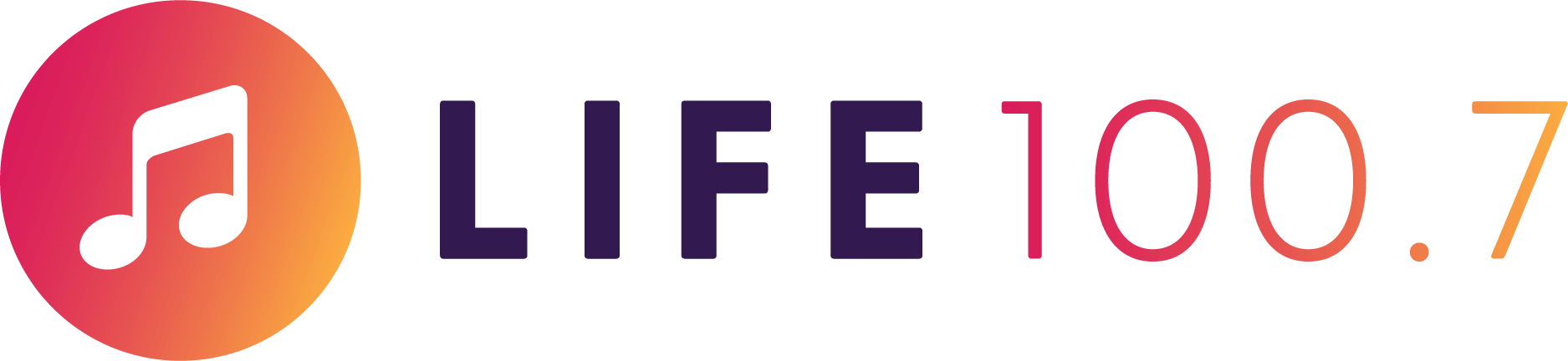
- Omaha, Nebraska; United States
- Broadcast area: Omaha–Council Bluffs metropolitan area
- Frequency: 100.7 MHz
- Branding: Life 100.7

Programming
- Format: Christian adult contemporary

Ownership
- Owner: Northwestern Media; (University of Northwestern – St. Paul)

History
- First air date: May 17, 1966
- Call sign meaning: K Grace Bible Institute (original owners)

Technical information
- Licensing authority: FCC
- Facility ID: 24713
- Class: C0
- ERP: 100,000 watts
- HAAT: 309 meters (1,014 ft)
- Transmitter coordinates: 41°18′40″N 96°1′37″W
- Translator: 106.3 K285ET (Kiron, Iowa)

Links
- Public license information: Public file; LMS
- Webcast: Listen Live
- Website: lifeomaha.com

KGBI-FM (100.7 MHz, "Life 100.7") is a non-commercial radio station broadcasting a Christian adult contemporary radio format. Licensed to Omaha, Nebraska, United States, the station serves the Omaha and Lincoln, Nebraska radio markets. The station is owned and operated by Northwestern Media, a ministry of the University of Northwestern - St. Paul.

Life 100.7's studios are located on 1065 N 115th St, Suite 201 in Omaha, while its transmitter is located at the Omaha master antenna farm at North 72nd Street and Crown Point Avenue.

== History ==
=== Grace Bible Institute ===
Grace Bible Institute began in 1943 in Omaha as an extension of Oklahoma Bible Academy, originally in Meno, Oklahoma. Both institutions were affiliated with the General Mennonite Conference, and the addition of an Omaha school was intended to give a boost to enrollment by being based in a larger city with more employment opportunities for its students.

One of Grace Bible Institute's outreaches began during the early 1950s was a weekly radio program. The school had been offered free air time on AM 1290 KOIL radio in Omaha, and on February 3, 1952, "Grace Notes" began to air. The half-hour weekly program was prepared by students with the help of the Grace music department. In 1953 this program moved to AM 1110 KFAB, a 50,000-watt clear-channel station with a much larger coverage area. Additionally, the program was carried on stations in other states, where there were alumni who were willing to help underwrite the costs of broadcasting.

=== Building the station ===
During the 1960s, Grace's president was Waldo Harder. With the support of students and the faculty, he began to campaign for an FM radio station that would be operated by Grace Bible Institute, to reach Omaha and the surrounding area with Bible teaching and inspirational music. Between 1963 and 1965, preparations were made to make the station possible, including the necessary Federal Communications Commission (FCC) license and the city of Omaha for permits. Ward Childerston, a 1954 Grace alumnus, was hired as station manager.

Built entirely with donations, KGBI-FM began broadcasting on May 17, 1966, from studios and an antenna based on the Grace campus. It broadcast with a power of 30,000 watts, and the original broadcast day ran only from 3 pm to 10 pm. By October 1, 1966, the schedule had expanded to seventeen hours daily, and by January 1, 1969, the daily broadcast schedule ran from 6 am to midnight. The original on-campus tower was 165 feet (50 m) in height. Ward Childerston reported that men living near the transmitter were hearing the station through their electric razors.

In 1973, KGBI-FM moved its tower to a new site fifteen miles (24 km) southwest of Omaha. The new 499-foot (152 m) tower allowed the station to broadcast a 100,000-watt signal in full stereo.

=== Upgrading the tower ===
The taller tower had allowed KGBI-FM to extend its coverage area, but by the late 1980s it was showing its age. After sixteen years of use and weather-related damage (it was struck by lightning more than once), a new tower was needed. This change was made more necessary by a new FCC mandate, which had then made it a requirement that all class C stations broadcast from at least a 1,200-foot (370 m) tower, or risk being reclassified and potentially lose access to their current coverage area. The new 1,200-foot (370 m) tower was brought into service on June 1, 1990, and expanded the coverage area to as far as 120 miles (190 km) away. The broadcast was also expanded by an hour, to run from 6 a.m. to 1 a.m. daily.

Grace Bible Institute itself continued to grow and expand. In 1976, the name was changed to Grace College of the Bible, to reflect its full status as a four-year institution of higher learning. The radio station also began a further expansion at this time. In May 1976, the board of directors approved purchase of radio station KROA-FM in Doniphan, Nebraska (between Grand Island and Hastings). With a 100,000 watt signal, KROA reached much of central Nebraska. The transfer of operations took effect in 1977, and much of the programming of KGBI-FM in Omaha was mirrored on KROA-FM.

By January 1979, KGBI-FM's programming was extended to a full 24-hours-per-day.

=== Salem ownership ===
As a non-profit outreach of Grace University, KGBI-FM supported itself with occasional on air fundraisers which the station referred to as "share-a-thons." This continued to meet the financial needs of the station. By late 2004, however, an opportunity arose for Grace to sell KGBI-FM to the Salem Media Group for $8 million. Salem Media is the largest owner of religious radio stations in the U.S.

In January 2005, Salem also purchased KCRO, another Christian station broadcasting in Omaha. KCRO, privately owned and commercial, rather than non-profit, had also programmed a mix of music and teaching programs, but had focused more heavily on the teaching programs, and also leaned heavily towards Pentecostal or charismatic preachers. With the ownership of two stations in the Omaha area, Salem moved its most popular teaching programs from the KGBI-FM to KCRO, and eliminated any remaining music programming on KCRO. This change mirrored the direction of radio in general, with music playing predominantly on stereo FM stations, and talk programming airing on AM stations.

At the time of the sale of KGBI-FM, the Grand Island operation of KROA-FM transferred ownership to a new organization, Mission Nebraska, which currently links to translator stations that cover much of the state.

In January 2005, the transfer of ownership took effect, and the station began broadcasting Salem's format of Contemporary Christian music, with none of the former teaching programs that played on the station. KGBI-FM's license switched from non-commercial to commercial, allowing Salem to sell advertisements on the station. In early 2010, the station started the "KGBI-FM Rock Block" playing Christian rock music from bands such as Skillet, Family Force 5, Paramore and more.

On March 31, 2014, KGBI-FM rebranded as "100.7 The Fish", a branding used on many of Salem's contemporary Christian music stations.

=== University of Northwestern-St. Paul ===
In May 2018, Salem announced that it would be selling KGBI-FM to the University of Northwestern-St. Paul (UNWSP). The sale price was $3.15 million. UNWSP returned KGBI-FM to non-commercial status, with on-air fundraisers replacing the revenue from commercial advertisements. The deal split KGBI-FM from KCRO, KOTK, and their FM translators, which Salem sold to Hickory Radio. In addition, KGBI-FM dropped the "Fish" branding to return to identifying simply by their call letters. In May 2023, the station changed its name to Life 100.7.

UNWSP operates a chain of non-commercial Contemporary Christian outlets, including stations in Minneapolis-St. Paul, Kansas City, Des Moines, Sioux Falls, and Fargo-Moorhead.

=== Past programming ===
The original programming of KGBI-FM included inspirational music and programming. In the mid-1970s, typical programs included "Haven Of Rest," "Back to the Bible," and "NightSounds with Bill Pearce." Over the next twenty years, as Contemporary Christian music increased in popularity, KGBI gradually changed its format to include more contemporary music, and less of the older style of music it had played for many years.

By the 1990s, KGBI-FM played a combination of Christian music and teaching programs such as the venerable "Back to the Bible," "Focus on the Family," and "Insight For Living with Chuck Swindoll," until Salem purchased KGBI-FM, moving most of the teaching to KCRO, and focusing KGBI-FM on music.

Duties for DJ's at KGBI were reading news, weather, and introducing songs and on-air teaching.

== Translators ==
Broadcast translator for KGBI-FM
Call sign	Frequency	City of license	FID	ERP (W)	Class	FCC info
K285ET	(106.3 (Note: Translator owned by the West Iowa Fellowship of Evangelicals.)) FM	Kiron, Iowa	86551	250	D	LMS
