= Barrington College =

American Christian college

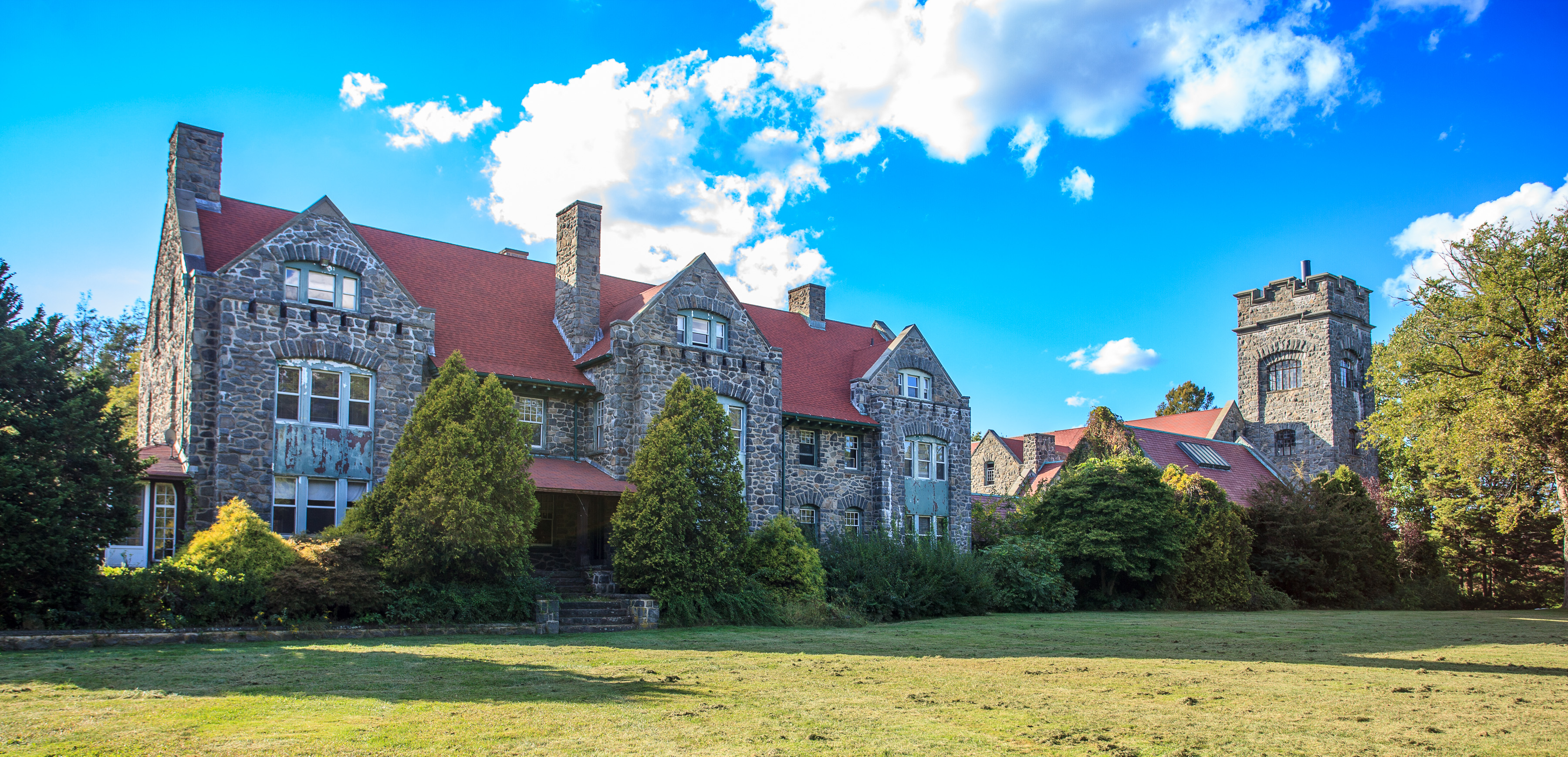
- Belton Court, the centerpiece of the college's campus
- Former names: Bethel Bible Training School, Dudley Bible Institute, Providence Bible Institute
- Type: Private
- Active: 1900; 126 years ago – 1985; 41 years ago
- Affiliations: Evangelical Christian
- President: David G. Horner
- Location: Barrington, Rhode Island, United States; 41.760132°N 71.332394°W
- Campus: Suburban
- Colors: Blue and Gold
- Mascot: The Warriors
- Website: Barrington College Facebook page

Barrington College was a four-year Christian liberal arts college located in Barrington, Rhode Island, United States. It is no longer in operation.

== History ==
Barrington College was founded by E. W. Kenyon, pastor of the New Covenant Baptist Church, in 1900 as the Bethel Bible Training School in Spencer, Massachusetts. It was relocated to Dudley, Massachusetts in 1923 and renamed the Dudley Bible Institute. It was then moved to Capitol Hill in Providence, Rhode Island in 1929 and renamed the Providence Bible Institute. In 1950, the school purchased Belton Court, a 150-acre (61 ha) estate in Barrington. In 1960, the Providence campus was sold and the college was renamed to Barrington College. Financially struggling, the college merged with Gordon College, another liberal arts Christian school in Wenham, Massachusetts, in 1985.

== Legacy ==
The Barrington Center for the Arts at Gordon is named in honor of Barrington College. The campus was sold and was the site of Zion Bible College, until Zion moved to Haverhill, Massachusetts, in 2008.

== Notable people ==
- David G. Horner: Alumnus, former president, current president of American College of Greece
- Doug Kane: member of the Illinois House of Representatives
- Woodrow M. Kroll: Alumnus, former president of Practical Bible College, current president of the Back to the Bible radio ministry
- Harold Hoehner: Professor of New Testament, Dallas Theological Seminary
- Charles E. Hummel: President of the college, writer, director of faculty ministries at Intervarsity Christian Fellowship
- Ronald H. Nash: Professor of Philosophy, Religion, and Theology.
- John Mbiti: alumnus; Professor of Philosophy, University of Bern
- Shirley Nelson: Alumna, lecturer in creative writing, award-winning author
