= Harold Hoehner =

American biblical scholar

Harold Walter Hoehner
- Born: January 12, 1935; Sangerfield, New York
- Died: February 12, 2009 (aged 74)
- Occupation: Biblical scholar
- Known for: work on biblical chronology
- Title: Distinguished professor of New Testament studies at Dallas Theological Seminary

Academic background
- Education: Barrington College, Dallas Theological Seminary (MTh, DTh); University of Cambridge (PhD)
- Alma mater: University of Cambridge
- Theses: Chronology of the Apostolic Age (D.Th) (1965); Herod Antipas: A Contemporary of Jesus Christ (Ph.D) (1972)

Academic work
- Institutions: Dallas Theological Seminary
- Notable works: Ephesians: An Exegetical Commentary (2002); Chronological Aspects of the Life of Christ (1978)

Harold Walter Hoehner (January 12, 1935 – February 12, 2009) was an American biblical scholar and was professor of New Testament studies at Dallas Theological Seminary.

== Family and education ==
Hoehner was born in Sangerfield, New York to Walter and Mary (née Siegel) Hoehner, farmers of Swiss and German descent, respectively. He earned his B.A. (1958) from Barrington College, his Th.M. (1962) and Th.D. (1965) from Dallas Theological Seminary, and his Ph.D. (1968) from University of Cambridge; he also did postdoctoral study at University of Tübingen and Cambridge. Hoehner married Virginia (Gini) Bryan on June 7, 1958, with whom he had four children (Stephen, Susan, David, and Deborah).

== Career ==
Hoehner joined the faculty of Dallas Theological Seminary in 1968 as an instructor, becoming an assistant professor there the same year. In 1973 he became associate professor of New Testament, and professor of New Testament and chairman of New Testament and Bible Exposition in 1977. He became distinguished professor of New Testament studies in 1999. He served as director of Ph.D. studies from 1975 until 2002. During his tenure, he had a significant influence on the seminary's approach to teaching biblical exegesis, and became well known for his work on biblical chronology. Hoehner also committed a major portion of his later years as a Bible translator, serving on the translation or review teams for the revision of the New Century Version (1991), the update of the New American Standard Bible (1995), the English Standard Version (2001), the second edition of the New Living Translation (2004), and the first edition of the NET Bible (2005). He was a member of the Society of Biblical Literature, the Evangelical Theological Society, Institute for Biblical Research, the Society for New Testament Studies, and the board of directors for Jews for Jesus.

== Publications ==
Hoehner wrote for several scholarly journals, including more than thirty articles for Bibliotheca Sacra. His doctoral dissertation on Herod Antipas was published by Cambridge University Press (1972, ISBN 978-0-521-08132-0), and continues to be a standard work on the subject. His publication Chronological Aspects of the Life of Christ (1978, ISBN 978-0-310-26211-4) is often cited in attempts to affix a date to the crucifixion of Jesus, as well as understanding the seventy weeks of Daniel. His "magnum opus", Ephesians: An Exegetical Commentary (2002, ISBN 978-0-8010-2614-0), called by Craig Blomberg "one of the most prodigious efforts by an individual New Testament scholar in recent times", is noted for its lengthy defense of the epistle's Pauline authorship.

== Death and legacy ==
Hoehner died at the age of 74 in his home in Dallas, Texas after a morning run on February 12, 2009. Among the colleagues and former students contributing to his Festschrift, Interpreting the New Testament Text: Introduction to the Art and Science of Exegesis (2006, ISBN 1-58134-408-2), were Darrell Bock, Daniel B. Wallace, E. Earle Ellis, I. Howard Marshall, and Edwin M. Yamauchi.

== Works ==
=== Books ===
- Hoehner, Harold W. (1962). The Reinstitution of Sacrifices in the Millennium (Th.M.). Dallas, TX: Dallas Theological Seminary. OCLC 23930611.
- ——— (1965). Chronology of the Apostolic Age (Th.D.). Dallas, TX: Dallas Theological Seminary. OCLC 2921114.
- ——— (1972). Herod Antipas. Society for New Testament Studies, Monograph series. Vol. 17. Cambridge, England: Cambridge University Press. ISBN 978-0-521-08132-0. OCLC 279284.
- ——— (1975). Chronological Aspects of the Life of Christ. Contemporary Evangelical Perspectives. Grand Rapids, MI: Zondervan. ISBN 978-0-310-26211-4. OCLC 668363743.
- ———; Nash, Ronald H. (1984). Christian Faith and Historical Understanding. Grand Rapids, MI: Zondervan; Probe Ministries International. ISBN 978-0-310-45121-1. OCLC 9644897.
- ——— (2002). Ephesians: an exegetical commentary. Grand Rapids, MI: Baker Academic. ISBN 978-0-801-02614-0. OCLC 50124936.

=== Articles and chapters ===
- ——— (1969). "Duration of the Egyptian Bondage". Bibliotheca Sacra. 126: 306–316.
- ——— (1970). "Why Did Pilate Hand Jesus Over to Antipas?". In Bammel, Ernst (ed.). The Trial of Jesus. Cambridge Studies in honour of C.F.D. Moule. Studies in Biblical Theology, Second Series. Vol. 13. London: SCM Press. pp. 84–90. ISBN 0334016789.
- ——— (1973). "Chronological Aspects of the Life of Christ". Bibliotheca Sacra. 130.
- ——— (1974). "Chronological Aspects of the Life of Christ, Part I: The Date of Christ's Birth". Bibliotheca Sacra. 131 (520): 338–351.
- ——— (1974). "Chronological Aspects of the Life of Christ, Part II: The Commencement of Christ's Ministry". Bibliotheca Sacra. 131 (521): 41–54.
- ——— (1974). "Chronological Aspects of the Life of Christ, Part III: The Duration of Christ's Ministry". Bibliotheca Sacra. 131 (522): 147–162.
- ——— (1974). "Chronological Aspects of the Life of Christ, Part IV: The Day of Christ's Crucifixion". Bibliotheca Sacra. 131 (523): 241–264.
- ——— (1974). "Chronological Aspects of the Life of Christ, Part V: The Year of Christ's Crucifixion". Bibliotheca Sacra. 131 (524): 332–348.
- ——— (1975). "Chronological Aspects of the Life of Christ, Part VI : Daniel's Seventy Weeks and New Testament Chronology". Bibliotheca Sacra. 132: 47–65.
