= Charles Hummel =

Charles Hummel may refer to:

- Charles E. Hummel (1923–2004), American writer and president of Barrington College
- Charles F. Hummel (1932–2025), American curator, author and educator
- Charles F. Hummel (architect) (1857–1939), German-born American architect
