= Bernard Palmer =

American writer (1914–1998)

- Born: Bernard Alvin Palmer; November 21, 1914; Central City, Nebraska, U.S.
- Died: May 7, 1998 (aged 83); Holdrege, Nebraska, U.S.
- Occupation: Author
- Spouse(s): June Berger (m. 1934; died 1939); Marjorie Palmer (née Matthews; m. 1940)
- Children: 4
- Writing career
- Period: 1942–1980s
- Genres: Christian fiction; children’s literature; young adult fiction
- Notable works: Danny Orlis series; Felicia Cartright series

Bernard Alvin Palmer (November 21, 1914 – May 7, 1998), born in Central City, Nebraska, was an American author who wrote more than 165 books, primarily Christian fiction for children and young adults. He created series such as the Danny Orlis series, the Felicia Cartright series, and the Pioneer Girls series, which he co-authored with his wife Marjorie Palmer.

== Early life and education ==
Bernard Palmer was born on November 21, 1914 in Central City, Nebraska, to Ben H. Palmer, who worked in the monument business, and Stella (Jarvis) Palmer. When he was four years old, his family moved to Holdrege, Nebraska. Palmer grew up on the prairies of Nebraska in an environment he later described as ideal training for a writer of children’s stories. His father organized rodeos throughout the region, and Palmer accompanied him on some of these trips. Palmer visited an uncle who taught on a South Dakota reservation and made annual family trips to his grandfather’s farm in Minnesota. Settings resembling the northern forests, prairies, and western landscapes he knew from childhood later appeared in his fiction.

Palmer attended Kearney State College in 1933 and Hastings College in 1940. Palmer later said that a writing assignment in a remedial English course prompted him to consider writing professionally.

== Career ==
Palmer spent much of his early and mid-career working in the monument industry. He was a stonecutter and shop foreman at Palmer Brothers Monument Company in Holdrege, Nebraska, from 1957 to 1967. He later served as vice-president (1962–1974), president (from 1974), and chair of the company’s board of directors (from 1974). Palmer began publishing books in 1942 while continuing to work in the family monument business. He also served on the board of directors of the Tyndale Foundation beginning in 1963.

Palmer wrote Christian juvenile fiction, adventure stories, and instructional books. His early books included Parson John (1942), Storm Winds (1942), and Visibility Zero (1944). Over subsequent decades his books were published by Zondervan, Moody Press, Back to the Bible, Bethany House, and Tyndale House.

Palmer authored dozens of standalone titles and created or contributed to numerous book series, some coauthored with his wife, Marjorie Palmer, including the Danny Orlis series, the Brigade Boys, the Felicia Cartright series, Golden Boy, Halliway Boys, Little Feather, Lori Adams, Mel Webb, Mickey Turner, the Orlis Twins, Pat Collins/Jim Dunlap, Pioneer Girls (all with Marjorie Palmer), the Powell Family, and the Ted and Terri series. Writing under the pseudonym John Runyan, he produced the Biff Norris and Tom Barnes series.

Palmer also wrote nonfiction and books on Christian education, including Pattern for a Total Church (1975), and several coauthored books with Marjorie Palmer such as How Churches Grow (1976).

In addition to authoring books, Palmer was also the editor of Christian Life magazine for several years.

Palmer wrote the weekly Saturday Youth Program radio series for Back to the Bible Broadcast from 1950 to 1976 and helped develop screenplays for Christian films, including adaptations of My Son, My Son and Silent Thunder. He also served on the board of publications of the Evangelical Free Church of America during multiple terms between 1965 and 1974 and again beginning in 1980.

== Personal life and death ==
Palmer married June Berger on June 20, 1934; she died on September 28, 1939. The couple had one son, James Barrett "Barry" Palmer. On December 12, 1940, he married writer Marjorie Matthews. They had three children together.

Palmer was affiliated with the Evangelical Free Church of America. He served as president of the Nebraska chapter of Gideons International and was a member of Kiwanis.

His novel My Son, My Son, which was adapted into a feature film by Ken Anderson in 1973, tells the semi-autobiographical story of Palmer and his son, Barry.

Palmer died on May 7, 1998.

== Bibliography ==
Danny Orlis Series

Felicia Cartright Series

This paperback series was published by Moody Press between 1958 and 1971 and consists of at least 19 titles.

- The Case of the Uncut Diamond (1958)
- The Case of the Green Medallion (1958)
- The Case of the Missing Sideboard (1958)
- The Frantic Search (1958)
- The Frightened Student (1959)
- The Case of the Twisted Key (1959)
- The Case of the Dancing Fire (1960)
- The Lonely Teacher (1960)
- The Troubled Rancher (1961)
- The Storm-Scarred Mountain (1961)
- The Hungry Fiddler (1962)
- The Case of the Antique Bookmark (1963)
- The Lost Puppy (1965)
- The Knotted Wire (1966)
- The Honorable Traitor (1967)
- The Black Phantom (1968)
- The Lone Ski Boot (1969)
- The Sad-Eyed Girl (1970)
- The Pink Poodle (1971)

Pat Collins Series

This scarce series consists of at least five juvenile books published in hardback format by Moody Press between 1957 and 1959.

- The Peculiar Dr. B (1957, republished 1959 as, The Peculiar Dr. Brockton)
- Secret Engine (1957)
- Hidden Treasure (1957)
- Wingless Plane (1957)
- The Captive Scientist (1958)

Jim Dunlap Series

Published by Moody Press in paperback format. There are at least six titles, and all of them have been translated into German. These are the Pat Collins books with the protagonist renamed, along with a few other minor changes.

- Jim Dunlap and the Strange Dr. Brockton (1967)
- Jim Dunlap and the Secret Rocket Formula (1967) (The same title was published with the first two books under one cover, same copyright date.)
- Jim Dunlap and the Wingless Plane (1968)
- Jim Dunlap and the Mysterious Orbiting Rocket (1968)
- Jim Dunlap and the Long Lunar Walk (1974)
- Jim Dunlap and the Mysterious Spy (1974)

Little Feather Series

This series was published by Zondervan between 1944 and 1953 and was available in both dust jacket and picture cover editions.

- Little Feather at Big Bear Lake (1944)
- Little Feather Goes Hunting (1946)
- Little Feather Rides Herd (1947)
- Little Feather and the Mystery Mine (1948)
- Little Feather at Tonka Bay (1950)
- Little Feather and the Secret Package (1951)
- Little Feather and the River of Grass (1953)

Lori Adams Series

Published by in paperback editions by Moody Press. At least four titles.

- Lori Adams and the Old Carter House Mystery (1969)
- Lori Adams and the Riverboat Mystery (1971)
- Lori Adams and the Adopted Rebel (1971)
- Lori Adams and the Jungle Search (1974)

The Bradley Series

Published by Back to the Bible Broadcast in paperback editions. At least seven titles.

- The Mysterious Letter (1975)
- Jon and the Break-In Mystery (1976)
- Homesteading in Standing Bear’s Territory (1976)
- Trena and the Old Diary (1976)
- Princess Pat Saves the Day (1977)
- Trena’s Rodeo Rival (1977)
- The Mystery of the Missing Fossil (1977)
- The Mystery of the New Skis (1975)

The Breck Western Series

Published by a variety of publishers: Horizon House Publishers and Beaverlodge in Canada, and Living Books and Tyndale House Publishers in the U.S. All in paperback format. At least five titles in the series.

- Breck’s Choice (1981)
- Hunted Gun (1982)
- Kid Breckenridge (1984)
- Shoot-Out at Buffalo Gulch (1985)
- Trail Boss (1986)

Brigade Boys Series

Published by Moody Press in paperback format. At least six titles.

- The Brigade Boys and the Phantom Radio (1960)
- The Brigade Boys in the Arctic Wilderness (1960)
- The Brigade Boys and the Flight to Danger (1960)
- The Brigade Boys and the Disappearing Stranger (1961)
- The Brigade Boys and the Basketball Mystery (1963)
- The Brigade Boys and the Burning Barn Mystery (1968)

Pioneer Girls Series

Published by Moody Press in paperback format. At least seven titles.

- The Pioneer Girls and the Mystery of the Missing Cocker (1959)
- The Pioneer Girls at Caribou Flats (1959)
- The Pioneer Girls and the Strange Adventures on Tomahawk Hill (1959)
- The Pioneer Girls and the Mystery of Oak Ridge Manor (1959)
- The Pioneer Girls and the Secret of the Jungle (1962)
- The Pioneer Girls and the Mysterious Bedouin Cave (1963)
- The Pioneer Girls and the Dutch Hill Mystery (1968)

Ted and Terri Series

Originally published by Moody Press in paperback format in 1971. At least five titles.

- Ted and Terri and the Secret Captive
- Ted and Terri and the Troubled Trumpeter
- Ted and Terri and the Broken Arrow
- Ted and Terri and the Crooked Trapper
- Ted and Terri and the Stubborn Bully

The Halliway Boys Series

Originally published by Moody Press in paperback format. At least four titles.

- The Halliway Boys and the Mysterious Treasure Map (1960)
- The Halliway Boys on Forbidden Mountain
- The Halliway Boys on Crusade Island
- The Halliway Boys on Secret African Safari (1962)

Four more Halliway Boys published by Moody Pocket Books

- The Halliway Boys On the Secret Expedition (1958)
- The Halliway Boys and the Disappearing Staircase (1958)
- The Halliway Boys and the Missing Film Mystery (1960)
- The Halliway Boys on A Dangerous Voyage (1958)

The Biff Norris Series

Originally published by Moody Press under the pseudonym John Runyan

- Biff Norris and the Clue of the Lonely Landing Strip (1962)
- Biff Norris and the Clue of the Worn Saddle (1962)
- Biff Norris and the Clue of the Nervous Stranger (1962)
- Biff Norris and the Clue of the Golden Ram (1962)
- Biff Norris and the Clue of the Midnight Stage (1963)
- Biff Norris and the Clue of the Lavender Mink (1964)
- Biff Norris and the Clue of the Gold Ring (1965)
- Biff Norris and the Clue of the Angry Fisherman (1966)
- Biff Norris and the Clue of the Disappearing Wolf (1967)
- Biff Norris and the Clue of the Mysterious Letter (1968)
- Biff Norris and the Clue of the Half-Burned Book (1969)

The Tom Barnes Series

Originally published by Moody Press under the pseudonym John Runyan

- Tom Barnes and the Substitute Second Baseman (1964)
- Tom Barnes, Blocking Back (1966)
- Tom Barnes, Forward (1968)

Books not in a series

Originally published by Moody Press in paperback format

- Jungle Jim (1956)
- Storm on the Muskeg (1957)
- New Skipper of the Flying Swede (with Marjorie Palmer) (1957)
- Miracle of the Prairies (with Marjorie Palmer) (1958)
- Del Norton in the Ozarks (1958)
- Andy Logan and the Oregon Trail Mystery, (1961)
- Mystery of Dungu-re (Colportage Library #432) (1961)
- Tattered Loin Cloth (1962)
- Adventure in Tanganyika (1963)
- Yukuma the Brave and Other Missionary Stories (Moody Youth Library #126) (1964)
- God is for the Alcoholic (with Jerry Dunn) (1965)
- The Wind Blows Wild (1968, hb; 1975, pb)
- Sue Riley and the Mysterious Cargo (1968)
- My Son, My Son (1970)
- Seek No Tomorrow (1971)
- God Understands (1973)
- The Wheelbarrow and the Comrade (with Irene Hanson) (1973)
- Amsterdam Rebel (1973)
- Frosty Roberts and the Golden Jade Mystery (1975)
- The Davis Triplets and the Film Action (1975)
- White Water on the Yukon (1975)
- 'Atsa Louie, I'ma Phil (with Louie and Phil Palermo) (1975)
- Nothing Is Impossible (1979)
- Hitched to a Star (1981)

A Career Book series

- Big Season "A Career Book" Coaching (Colportage Library #404) (1960)
- Barbara Nichols, Fifth-Grade Teacher (with Marjorie Palmer)(1960)
- Student Nurse (with Marjorie Palmer) (1960) [retitled: Sandra Emerson, RN 1966]
- The Mystery of the Musty Ledger (1960)
- Peggy Archer, Missionary Candidate (with Marjorie Palmer) (1961)
- Brad Foster, Engineer (1962)
- Cal Henderson, M.D. (1963)
- Jim Shelton, Radio Engineer (1964)
- Lee Sloan, Missionary Pilot (1966)

Other standalone books written by Palmer and published by other publishers including Eerdmans, Zondervan, Hitchcock, Van Kampen, Back to the Bible, Sky Pilot Press, Nebraska Christian Press, Bethany House, Tyndale House, Victor Books, David C. Cook Publishing, Horizon House, Bethel Publishing, and Free Church Publications.

- Parson John (1942)
- Storm Winds (1942)
- Visibility Zero (1944)
- Dark Are the Shadows (1945)
- Dangerous Mission (1945)
- Mission of Mercy (1946)
- Goon Walford Fights Back (1946)
- Withering Grass (1949)
- Radio Stories (1950)
- Radio Stories #3 (1952)
- Sky Pilot Gang Busters (1955)
- Across the Deep Valleys (1969)
- So Restless, So Lonely (1970)
- Whisper the Robin (1972)
- The Winds of God Are Blowing (with Marjorie Palmer) (1973)
- A Bag without Holes (with Fred Eggerichs) (1975)
- Silent Thunder (1975)
- Pattern for a Total Church (1975)
- Yoneko (1976)
- People's Church on the Go (1976)
- How Churches Grow (with Marjorie Palmer) (1976)
- A Homemade Church (1977)
- McTaggart's Promise (1978)
- Who Made? Who Tells? Who Cares? Who Loves? (1979)
- Run for the West (1979)
- What'll You Have to Drink (1979)
- Ted and the Secret Club (1980)
- Understanding the Islamic Explosion (1980)
- The Flood (with Marjorie Palmer) (1982)
- Who Helps (with Marjorie Palmer) (1982)
- Who Shows (with Marjorie Palmer) (1982)
- Light a Small Candle (with Marjorie Palmer) (1983)
- While the Sun Is High (with Marjorie Palmer) (1984)

== See also ==
- Back to the Bible
