= Oklahoma Bible Academy =

Location
- 5913 W. Chestnut; Enid, Oklahoma 73703; United States; 36.4042°N 97.9523°W

Information
- School type: Independent, Christian school
- Religious affiliation: Christian
- Established: 1911
- Founder: J.B. Epp (as Meno Preparatory School)
- Dean: Jenelle Crismas (academics); Christopher Cayot (students)
- Headmaster: Andrew Wilkins
- Grades: 6 to 12
- Enrollment: 213 (2022)
- Average class size: 18.9
- Colors: Black, white, & red
- Nickname: Trojans
- Accreditation: Oklahoma State Department of Education, Association of Christian Schools International
- Tuition: $8,850 (MS) $9,700 (HS)
- Website: www.oklahomabible.com

The Oklahoma Bible Academy (OBA) is an interdenominational Christian private school located in Enid, Oklahoma. OBA is the oldest coeducational private school in the state of Oklahoma.

== History ==
In 1911 a group headed by J.B. Epp of the New Hopedale Mennonite Church, located in Meno, Oklahoma financed the construction of the Meno Preparatory School. In its early years the school served the local community by teaching elementary level courses, primarily focusing on the Bible and German language.

In the spring of 1917 at the Oklahoma Mennonite Convention, leaders formulated a plan for a two-year Bible academy and high school to serve all local churches. It was resolved, "that a committee of three be created to take in hand the matter of starting an academy." On March 27, 1918, through a special session of Oklahoma Convention, the General Conference Mennonite Churches adopted the school as its field of service and the Meno Preparatory School became the Oklahoma Bible Academy, using the original buildings and an expanded curriculum.

In 1924–1925 with the help of Adam Ratzlaff a new dormitory was built. Later a larger school was built including two dormitories. The 1960s brought additional changes to the Oklahoma Bible Academy campus, including: a new industrial arts building, a music-lunchroom, and a gymnasium.

By 1953, the school became a full four-year high school and received accreditation by the State of Oklahoma Department of Education. Enrollment in 1951-1952 was 58 students. The school added both seventh and eighth grades in 1977 and became a member of the Association of Christian Schools International in 1978. In the 2009–2010 school year OBA added sixth grade to its student body.

With the growth of Christian elementary schools in the nearby community of Enid, Oklahoma came the need for a Christian high school, and in 1982 the OBA Corporation voted to move the school to Enid, Oklahoma. Campus expansion across the past two decades has included an auditorium with seating for over 400 people that was built in 1995, a football field in 2001, the Advance Learning Center in 2003, and a track in 2006.

== Notable students ==
- Melissa Dell Professor
- Theodore H. Epp Radio host
- Jerry Regier Deputy Assistant Secretary for Human Services Policy
- Dylan Moser Playwright

== See also ==
- Grace Bible Institute
- KGBI-FM
- Ozark Christian College
