= Evangelical Church of Bangkok =

Evangelical Christian church in Bangkok, Thailand

Coordinates: 13°44′04″N 100°33′23″E

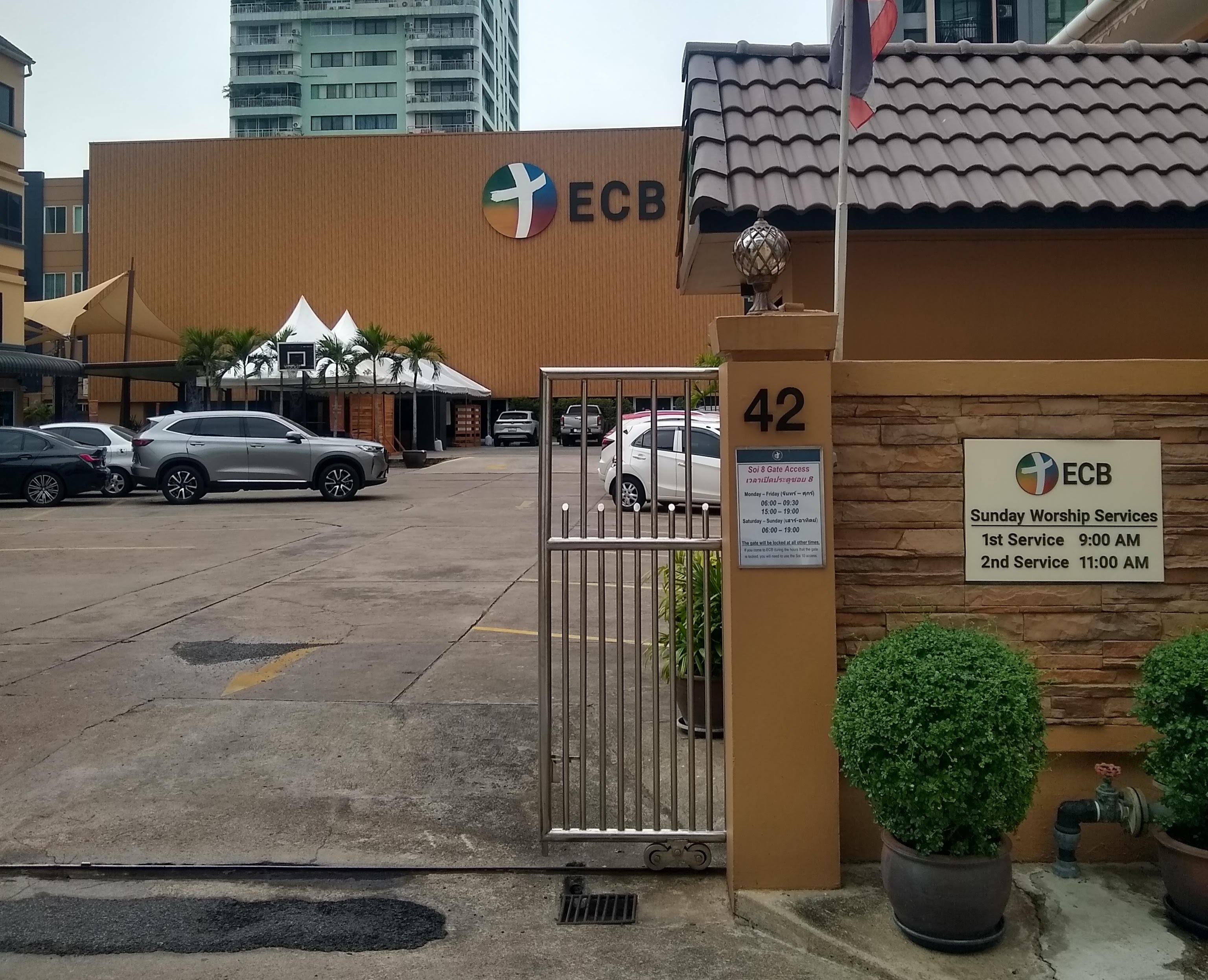
- Evangelical Church of Bangkok
- Address: 42 Sukhumvit Soi 10, Bangkok, Thailand
- Denomination: Evangelical Protestantism
- Website: https://www.ecb.asia/

History
- Founded: 1966

Architecture
- Style: Modernist

Clergy
- Pastor(s): Phil Holcomb, Pablo Morales, Kevin Moua

The Evangelical Church of Bangkok is situated at 42 Sukhumvit Soi 10, Bangkok, Thailand. It is an international church, a member of the Evangelical Free Church of America, a denomination of Protestant churches, and is affiliated to the Evangelical Fellowship of Thailand.

The Evangelical Church of Bangkok was established in 1966 by the Christian and Missionary Alliance as a base for preaching by missionaries and grew into a multi-cultural congregation with members from over 40 countries from different denominational backgrounds.

== Description ==
The site, including the main church constructed in the modernist style, consists of a fellowship area, classrooms, a children's ministry area, and apartments for several pastoral families. It has a staff of 30 full-time members, including four pastors, supported by several hundred volunteers. In 2023, its income was 41.29 million Thai baht, which was derived from gifts and donations.

A number of different ministries are conducted at the church, including men's and women's ministries, children's ministries, and a young professional's ministry, as well as biblical education classes and outreach programs.
