= Shirley Nelson =

American author (1925–2022)

Shirley Faye Nelson
- Born: 12 October 1925; Shillington, Pennsylvania, U.S.
- Died: April 27, 2022 (aged 96); Amherst, Massachusetts, U.S.
- Education: Providence Bible Institute; Moody Bible Institute; University at Albany (M.A. English)
- Occupation: Author · Historian · Educator · Filmmaker
- Years active: c. 1970s–2000s
- Organizations: Barrington College (creative writing faculty)
- Known for: Novelist and historian focusing on religious community history; co‑director of documentary *Precarious Peace: God and Guatemala*
- Notable work: The Last Year of the War (1978); Fair, Clear and Terrible: The Story of Shiloh, Maine (1989); The Risk of Returning (2014)
- Spouse: Rudy Nelson (m. 1951–2022; her death)
- Children: Three

Shirley Faye Nelson (née White, October 12, 1925 – April 27, 2022) was an American author of three books, including The Last Year of the War.

== Early life ==
Nelson was born in Shillington, Pennsylvania in 1925, spent several years in New Jersey, and was raised in Holliston, Massachusetts. Her parents were Arnold and Merlyn White, fundamentalist Christians who once belonged to the Shiloh Colony in Maine. She attended Moody Bible Institute and Providence Bible Institute where she met her future husband, the author and academic Rudy Nelson, in the 1940s. The couple married in 1951.

== Career ==
Nelson wrote three books, including The Last Year of the War which received many positive reviews and which won the Harper-Saxton Fellowship, the Chicago Friends of Literature award for fiction, and Honorable Mention for the Janet Heidinger Kafka Prize in 1979. She also taught creative writing for ten years at Barrington College. In 2006 she wrote and produced, along with her husband, the documentary film Precarious Peace: God and Guatemala. In addition, Nelson published poetry and essays in a variety of magazines and journals, including Southwest Review, Family Circle, Books and Culture, Old House Journal, and The Christian Century. After publishing her first book, Nelson earned a master's degree in English from the University of Albany.

== Personal life and death ==
Nelson was married to Rudy Nelson, a professor at the University of Albany, for 71 years, and together they had three children. She died in Amherst, Massachusetts on April 27, 2022, at the age of 96.

== Publications ==
=== Books ===
- The Last Year of the War (Harper and Row, 1978).
- Fair, Clear and Terrible: The Story of Shiloh, Maine (British American Publishing, 1989).
- The Risk of Returning (Troy Book Makers, 2014).

=== Anthologies ===
- Entries in The Eternal Present (daily readings), ed. Andrea Wells Miller. New York, Berkeley: The Crossroads Publishing Company, 2003.
- “Frank Sandford: Tongues of Fire in Shiloh, Maine,” essay in Portraits of a Generation: Early Pentecostal Leaders, ed. James Goff, Jr., and Grant Wacker, pp. 51–69. Fayetteville: University of Arkansas Press, 2002. With Rudy Nelson.
- “Prospecting,” essay in Rattling Those Dry Bones: Women Changing the Church, ed. June Hagen. San Diego, CA: Luramedia, 1995.
- “The Secret Stair (My MacDonald Syndrome),” Once Upon a Christmas, A Treasury of Memories, ed. Emilie Griffin. Norwalk, CT: The C.R. Gibson Company, 1993.
- “All Souls Day,” essay in Epiphanies: Stories for the Christian Year, ed. Eugene Peterson. New York: Macmillan Publishing Co., 1992.

=== Periodicals ===
- “Making Peace,” back story to documentary “Precarious Peace: God and Guatemala,” Image: Journal of Art and Religion, #44 (Winter, 2004), with Rudy Nelson.
- “Buechner: Novelist to ‘Cultural Despisers.’” Christianity Today (May 29, 1981).
- "Interview with Frederick Buechner," Christianity and Literature, Vol. 32, No. 1, (Fall 1982), pp. 9–14.
- “The Ethics of Remembering: Echoes of the Sixties,” featured review of Sue Miller's “The Distinguished Guest” in Christian Century, Vol. 114, #9 (March 12, 1997).
- “The Things File,” short story in Image: Journal of the Arts and Religion, #11 (Fall 1995).
- “Stewards of the Imagination: Ron Hansen, Larry Woiwode and Sue Miller,” in Christian Century, Vol. 112, #3 (January 25, 1995).
