= Danny Orlis series =

Christian fiction series

Danny Orlis, Star Back (1957), one of the novels centered on the character Danny Orlis

Danny Orlis is a Christian fiction series for youth by American author Bernard Palmer (1914–1998) and published predominantly by Moody Press of Chicago. Created in 1954, for many years the series was a regular feature on the weekly Back to the Bible radio broadcasts for youth in the 1950s–1980s. In early books, the title character was a high school student living in the Northwest Angle of Minnesota, whose Christian faith was tested by peer pressure amidst his adventures living on the Lake of the Woods and in meeting various characters in northern Minnesota communities such as Baudette and Warroad.

== Background ==
The Danny Orlis series grew out of Bernard Palmer's interest in writing stories set in the remote communities of northern Minnesota. In early 1950, Palmer encountered a Life magazine feature describing the life of a boy (David Colson) living at Angle Inlet, a small community in northern Minnesota near the Canadian border. The Life magazine story, which emphasized self-reliance, hunting and fishing, along with the challenges of isolation, prompted Palmer to investigate the area firsthand. During the summer of 1950, Palmer visited Angle Inlet, met the family described in the magazine feature, and gathered extensive local stories and observations that later informed his fiction.

After returning home in September 1950, Palmer was contacted by Theodore Epp, founder of the evangelical radio ministry Back to the Bible, with a request to write a multi-part children's story designed to hold listeners’ interest from week to week. Palmer received permission from the family he had met in Angle Inlet to use their son as a model for a fictional character, and the character Danny Orlis was created as the centerpiece of these radio narratives.

The early Danny Orlis stories circulated first through Back to the Bible’s children’s radio programming and related print outlets before becoming a long-running book series. Palmer’s radio scripts were edited for broadcast, with some stories later appearing in serial form in the ministry’s children’s magazine Young Ambassador. In the early 1950s, Back to the Bible also issued promotional material featuring Danny Orlis stories, and in 1954 Moody Press (under editor Ken Taylor) obtained permission to adapt the narratives into novels for wider distribution. Danny Orlis was thus influenced by a combination of evangelical broadcasting, children’s publications, and religious publishing. In addition, the Danny Orlis books, while always written by Palmer, were overseen by an editorial committee who help to shape the messages of the books beyond Palmer's original vision.

== About the series ==
A 1970 advertisement for the series gives the following description:

"Adventure, mystery, suspense - these make up every Danny Orlis story. From the northern Canadian wilderness to the steaming jungles of Guatemala, Danny meets danger and mystery as well as everyday problems in the homeland. He is a capable outdoorsman, a skilled athlete — and above all a consistent Christian. Quick action, quiet courage, and level-headed thinking often save the day as Danny uses his resources to the fullest. His ability to apply biblical solutions to every situation makes him a unique personality whose experiences often provide realistic guidelines for Christian youth facing similar difficulties."

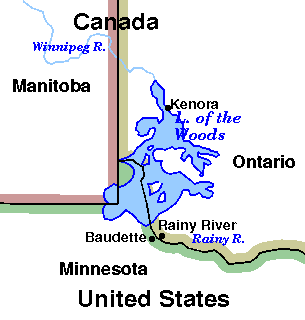
The Lake of the Woods, the setting of early stories

The ad continues:

"In the earlier stories in the series Danny himself is central, growing up amid the complications arising out of school life, sporting events, outdoor dangers and other equally interesting settings and happenings. In the later books, Danny as an adult influences other young people in exciting lifelike situations. Together with his wife, Kay, they offer wise counsel and a meaningful example to young people who face choices of lasting consequence."

The series consists of over seventy titles. Two other key publishing companies who published the books are Tyndale Publishers and Back to the Bible Publications.

== Moody Press ==
Palmer's works published by Moody Press include:

- Danny Orlis and the Charging Moose (1954)
- Danny Orlis and the Storm (1954)
- Danny Orlis and the Silver-Cross Fox (1954)
- Danny Orlis and the Angle Inlet Mystery (1954)
- Danny Orlis and the Strange Forest Fires (1955)
- Danny Orlis and the Hunters (1955)
- Danny Orlis Goes to School (1955)
- Danny Orlis on Superstition Mountain (1955)
- Danny Orlis Makes the Team (1956)
- Danny Orlis and the Wrecked Plane (1956)
- Danny Orlis and the Big Indian (1956)
- Danny Orlis Changes Schools (1956)
- Danny Orlis and the Rocks that Talk (1956)
- Danny Orlis Plays Hockey (1957)
- Danny Orlis and the Point Barrow Mystery (1957)
- Danny Orlis and the Boy Who Would Not Listen (1957)
- Danny Orlis, Star Back (1957)
- Danny Orlis and His Big Chance (1958)
- Danny Orlis and the Terrible Mistake (1958) - original title Danny Orlis and the Contrary Mrs. Forester
- Danny Orlis and the Man from the Past (1959)
- Danny Orlis, Big Brother (1959)
- Danny Orlis on the "Valiant" (1959)
- Danny Orlis and Marilyn's Great Trial (1959)
- Danny Orlis and the Mystery of the Sunken Ship (1960)
- Danny Orlis in Mysterious 'Zandeland (1960)
- Danny Orlis and the Time of Testing (1961)
- Danny Orlis, Bush Pilot (1961)
- Danny Orlis and Hal's Great Victory (1962)
- Danny Orlis and the Drugstore Mystery (1962)
- Danny Orlis and the Ordeal at Camp (1963)
- Danny Orlis and Ron's Call to Service (1963)
- Danny Orlis and the Headstrong Linda Penner (1963)
- Danny Orlis and Linda's Struggle (1964)
- Danny Orlis and the Ice Fishing Escapade (1964)
- Danny Orlis and the Defiant Kent Gilbert (1965)
- Danny Orlis and Linda's New Mother (1965)
- Danny Orlis and Robin's Big Battle (1965)
- Danny Orlis and Robin's Big Mistake (1966)
- Danny Orlis and Kent's Encounter With the Law (1966)
- Danny Orlis and the Old Mine Mystery (1966)
- Danny Orlis and Robin's Rebellion (1966)
- Danny Orlis and Jim's Northern Adventure (1967)
- Danny Orlis and a Teen-Age Marriage (1967)
- Danny Orlis and Kent Gilbert's Tragedy (1967)
- Danny Orlis and Trouble on the Circle R Ranch (1968)
- Danny Orlis and Fritz McCloud, High School Star (1968)
- Danny Orlis and Jim Morgan's Scholarship (1968)
- Danny Orlis and the Accident that Shook Fairview (1968)
- Danny Orlis and the Guatemala Adventure (1968)
- Danny Orlis and the Dry Gulch Mystery (1969)
- Danny Orlis and the Bid for Victory (1969)
- Danny Orlis and Johnny's New Life (1969)
- Danny Orlis and DeeDee's Best Friend (1970)
- Danny Orlis and DeeDee's Defiance (1970)
- Danny Orlis and the Mysterious Visitors (1970)
- Danny Orlis and the Bewildered Runaway (1971)
- Danny Orlis and the Football Feud (1971)
- Danny Orlis and the Mexican Kidnapping (1971)
- Danny Orlis and Excitement at the Circle R (1971)
- Danny Orlis and the Live-In Tragedy (1972)
- Danny Orlis and the Colorado Challenge (1972)
- Danny Orlis and the Alaskan Highway Adventure (1972)
- Danny Orlis and the Canadian Caper (1972)
- Danny Orlis and the Ski Slope Emergency (1973)
- Danny Orlis and the Mystery at Northwest High (1973)
- Danny Orlis and Doug's Big Disappointment (1973)
- Danny Orlis and the Rock Point Rebel (1974)
- Danny Orlis and the Girl Who Dared (1974)
- Danny Orlis and the Mysterious Intruder (1974)

== Back to the Bible Publications ==
- Danny Orlis and the Live-In Tragedy (1970)
- Danny Orlis Stalks the Poachers (1983)
- Danny Orlis and the Mystery at Smuggler's Point (1984)
- Danny Orlis and the School Computer Break-In (1984)
- Danny Orlis Resists the Witch Doctor (1984)
- Danny Orlis and the Mysterious Neighbor (1985)
- Danny Orlis Stories: Danny Makes a Trip to Mexico

== Tyndale Publishers ==
1. Danny Orlis and the Final Touchdown (1989) - original title Danny Orlis Makes the Team (Moody Press, 1956)
2. Danny Orlis and the Last Minute Miracle (1989) - original title Danny Orlis Changes Schools (Moody Press, 1956)
3. Danny Orlis and the Race Against Time (1989) - original title Danny Orlis and the Boy Who Would Not Listen (Moody Press, 1957)
4. Danny Orlis and the Showdown (1989) - original title Danny Orlis Star Back (Moody Press, 1957)
5. Danny Orlis and the Case of the Talking Rocks (1989) - original title Danny Orlis and the Rocks that Talk (Moody Press, 1955)
6. Danny Orlis and the Sacred Ruins (1989)

== More Danny Orlis books by the author ==
- Danny and Ron Orlis in the Sacred Cave (1956)
- Danny and Ron Orlis in the Canadian Wilderness (1960)
- Danny Orlis and Ron's Call to Service (1963)
- Danny and Ron Orlis and the Mexican Jungle Mystery (1965)
- Ron Orlis and the James Bay Adventure (1963)
- The Orlis Twins and the Secret of the Mountain (1959)
- The Orlis Twins Live for Christ (1959)
- The Orlis Twins Live for Christ and the Narcotics Mystery [double novel] (1959)
- The Orlis Twins and the New Coach (1960)
- The Orlis Twins and Mike's Last Chance (1960)
- The Orlis Twins and Jim Morgan's Ordeal
- The Orlis Twins and Ron's Big Problem (1962)
- The Orlis Twins and Roxie's Triumph (1963)
