= Waldo E. Harder =

American university administrator

Waldo Elmer Harder (1918–1976) was the sixth president of Grace University (then Grace Bible Institute) in Omaha, Nebraska, USA. He held an undergraduate degree from Wheaton College and M.A. and Th.M. degrees from Columbia Bible College and Seminary. He also studied at Northern Baptist Theological Seminary in Chicago.

His career marks his commitments to Christian missions and Christian education. He worked as a missionary among the Hopi people of Arizona from 1943-1946. He was the first superintendent of Berean Academy, a private Christian secondary school in Elbing, Kansas. From 1951 through 1961 he directed the Institut Biblique, a pastoral training institute of the Communauté Mennonite au Congo (then Congo Inland Mission) in the Democratic Republic of Congo (then Belgian Congo). The Institute Biblique is also known as the Kalonda Bible Institute and is located at Kalonda Station, just north of Tshikapa on the east bank of the Kasai River.

From 1961 to 1971, Waldo Harder served as president of Grace University. His administration was marked by record enrollments, facilities expansion including Schmidt Hall (men's dorm) and a new student center, and the first broadcasts of the school's radio station, KGBI-FM.

In 1971, he resigned from Grace and returned to mission work in Africa. Health issues required him to return to the United States in 1973, and he died in 1976. He is buried in Greenwood Cemetery in Newton, Kansas.

The Harder dormitory on the former Grace University campus was named after him. Since Grace's closure the dormitory has been developed by Urban Village Development into an apartment community called "Dahlman Flats."
