= John Mbiti =

Kenyan philosopher

The Reverend John Mbiti
- Born: John Samuel Mbiti; 30 November 1931; Mulango, Kenya
- Died: 5 October 2019 (aged 87); Burgdorf, Switzerland
- Spouse: Verena Mbiti-Siegenthaler

Ecclesiastical career
- Church: Church of England
- Ordained: 1963

Academic background
- Education: Barrington College; University of Cambridge
- Thesis: Christian Eschatology in Relation to the Evangelization of Tribal Africa (1963)

Academic work
- Discipline: Philosophy; theology
- School or tradition: African theology; communitarianism
- Institutions: Makerere University; Bossey Ecumenical Institute; University of Bern
- Notable works: African Religions and Philosophy (1969)
- Influenced: Ifeanyi Menkiti; Jesse Mugambi

John Samuel Mbiti (1931–2019) was a Kenyan-born Christian philosopher and writer. He was an Anglican priest and spent most of his life in Europe.

== Early life ==
John Mbiti was born on 30 November 1931 in Mulango, Kitui County, eastern Kenya. His parents were two farmers, Samuel Mutuvi Ngaangi and Valesi Mbandi Kiimba. He was one of six children and was raised in a strong Christian environment. His Christian upbringing encouraged his educational journey through the African Inland Church. He attended Alliance High School in Kikuyu and continued his education at University College of Makerere where he graduated in 1953. Mbiti furthered his academic education in the US and received his Bachelor of Arts degree in 1956 and a Bachelor of Theology degree in 1957 from Barrington College, a Christian liberal arts school in Rhode Island. He then earned his Doctor of Philosophy in theology at the University of Cambridge, from where he graduated in 1963. Supervised by C.F.D. Moule, his doctoral work sought to answer the question, "How can African societies be effectively evangelized so that the Christian faith can penetrate deeply and firmly into the African soil?"

== Later life and death ==
Mbiti taught religion and theology in Makerere University, Uganda, from 1964 to 1974 and was subsequently director of the World Council of Churches' Ecumenical Institute in Bogis-Bossey, Switzerland. He held visiting professorships at universities across the world and published extensively on philosophy, theology and African oral traditions.

Mbiti's seminal book, African Religions and Philosophy (1969), was the first work to challenge the Christian assumption that traditional African religious ideas were "demonic and anti-Christian". His sympathetic treatment of traditional religions was based on his extensive field work. Mbiti was clear that his interpretation of these religions was from a firmly Christian perspective. This aspect of his work was sometimes severely criticized.

Mbiti's research interests included theology in Africa and Asia, and ecumenism. He also collaborated on a book of African proverbs, which were collected from across the continent.

From 2005 up until his death in 2019, Mbiti was an emeritus professor at the University of Bern and a retired parish minister in the town of Burgdorf, Switzerland. He was married to Verena Mbiti-Siegenthaler and had four children and five grand-children. Mbiti died in Burgdorf on 5 October 2019.

== Religious work ==
After graduating from Cambridge University he was ordained an Anglican priest of the Church of England. He served as a parish priest in England until he returned to Makerere in 1964 to teach traditional African religions. From 1980 to 1996 Mbiti was a parish minister in Burgdorf, Switzerland and taught at the same time from 1983 onwards at the University of Bern.

== Academic work ==
Mbiti returned to Makerere University, where he taught African traditional religion from 1964 to 1974. While he was here he wrote his first book, African Religions and Philosophy (1969). His primary focus in his first book was to challenge the widely held views that African traditional religions were rooted in demonic anti-Christian values and to stress that traditional African religions deserve the same respect as Christianity, Islam, Judaism, and Buddhism. He based his claim on his knowledge that in the Bible, God is the creator of all things, therefore meaning that God has revealed himself to all things. Mbiti had little knowledge of African Traditional religion, as he was unaware of previous lectures regarding its foundations due to the deep oral traditions of such religions. He sought out his own personal research to teach the class. He gathered ideas from over 300 African peoples or tribes while conducting field research. Being asked by his students for a collection of his research compelled him to compile his notes and lectures into his first book, which was published in 1969. Following his career at Makerere, he held visiting professorships at universities across the world where he continued publishing books on philosophy, theology and African oral traditions.

From 1974 to 1980 Mbiti was the director of the World Council of Churches Bossey Ecumenical Institute. He held a series of influential conferences that focused on intercultural theology. His goal was to bring together African, Asian and other theologians for ecumenical encounter and dialogue. The first conference in June 1976 focused on African and Asian contributions to contemporary theology. This conference had an attendance of more than 80 participants. His second, more well-known conference, was entitled "Confessing Christ in Different Cultures". This conference held an attendance of more than 100 people who gathered from 35 different countries. There were discussions on how an individual could reach from a contextual to a universal confession of Christ and emphasized how confession can find expression in liturgy and worship. His third conference focused on "Indigenous Theology and the Universal Church".

Upon his retirement as a parish minister (1996) and university lecturer (2005) in Switzerland, Mbiti translated the entire New Testament from its original manuscripts in Greek and Hebrew into his mothertongue Kikamba, a Bantu language spoken by the Kamba people of Kenya (and Tanzania).

Among the numerous prestigious distinctions and honorary doctorates Mbiti received, the Anglican Church of Southern Africa honored Mbiti with the Archbishop’s Award for Peace and Justice during a celebration of his life and writing at the University of Stellenbosch, Republic of South Africa, in November 2016.

== Findings in African traditional religion ==
Mbiti in his book looks to dissect the origins of African traditional religion, specifically by studying oral traditions. The Igbo religion is one of the traditional African religions that Mbiti researched; their tradition was rooted in their culture. Received orally by authorities, this tradition was transmitted from generation to generation through the same oral process. Their traditions revolve around a highly ontological phenomena, pushing their followers to question their existence and being. Within their traditional life, individuals immersed themselves with religious participation, in which they believe starts before they are born and continues after their death. The Igbo religious life is connected to their ancestors and to those not yet born creating a mystic continuum. The Igbo religion fully embodies all characteristics of a traditional world religion, including its beliefs, sacred myths, oral qualities, strong appeal to the hearts of its followers, a high degree of ritualization, and possession of numerous participatory parsonages such as officiating elders, kings, priests and diviners. The Igbo religion differs from nontraditional proselytizing religions because it does not have elders who carry out missionary work and individuals who do not preach their religion onto others. They believe in a supreme being who is believed to be the controller of the world and all its inhabitants.

Mbiti also discovered that the Igbo religion considers that when an individual dies, their soul or spirit wanders until the body is given a proper burial. This waiting period is called the transitional period of the deceased. Christianity arrived in Igbo land in 1857, creating fear within the Igbo that if they became Christians their god would bring disaster to them. Others also refused to convert to Christianity because of the belief that Christian missionaries were there to destroy the Igbo religion. Christians attacked the traditional song music and dance of the Igbo religion as they deemed it immoral. This may have contributed to the emergence of religious conflict between the Igbo and the Christians, and the impression that African traditional religions were rooted in anti-Christian belief. Elders were merely protecting their traditions. One of Mbiti's most famous quotes in his book African Religions and Philosophy was: "Wherever the African is, there is religion."

== Criticisms ==
Mbiti faced criticism from the Ugandan writer Okot p'Bitek for casting his arguments in intellectual terms that had been established by the west. Specifically, his biggest criticism was that African cosmologies ultimately align with Christian views of God as omnipotent, omnipresent and eternal. P’Bitek wrote in his own book African Religions in Western Scholarship that the African traditional religions are beyond recognition to the ordinary Africans in the countryside. Mbiti supposedly never responded to the criticism, according to Derek Peterson, a professor of history and African studies at the University of Michigan.

Similarly, Tsenay Serequeberhan placed Mbiti in the tradition of ethnophilosophy and argued that Mbiti tries to "expose the interiority of the African to the subversive gaze of the Christian, Muslim, or modernizing Europeanized African."

== Works ==
- Akamba Stories. Oxford Library of African Literature. Oxford University Press (December 1966). ISBN 0-19-815120-9

This work consists of around 80 different stories of various kinds rooted in Kamba tales. Translated and edited to the English language, only two remain in Kikamba. They delve into Kamba life and society, the Kikamba language, as well as a detailed nature of the stories and the contexts within which they are told. To the common reader, they may deduce nothing more than a collection of pleasant African folk tales.

- Poems of Nature and Faith. Poets of Africa. East African Publishing House (1969).

A collection of poems from African poets

- African Religions and Philosophy. African Writers Series. Heinemann [1969] (1990). ISBN 0-435-89591-5

Mbiti’s first book takes a systematic look into the belief that African traditional religions were rooted in anti-Christian beliefs. He revised the book to include the role of women in religion

- Concepts of God in Africa. London: SPCK (April 1970). ISBN 0-281-02347-6

African peoples are not religiously illiterate; this book presents a portion of their traditional religious and philosophical wisdom gathered from over 270 different people or tribes. It contains a systematic study of practically all the information the author could find in writing and otherwise on African reflection about God. This reflection is influenced, naturally, by geographical, historical, cultural, and social-political factors.

- New Testament Eschatology in an African Background. Oxford University Press (March 1971). ISBN 0-19-821659-9

This book is a study of the new Testament Eschatology in an African Background: a study of the encounter between New Testament Theology and African Traditional Concepts.

- Love and Marriage in Africa. London: Longman (1973).
- Introduction to African Religion. African Writers Series. Heinemann [1975] (1991). ISBN 0-435-94002-3

This book takes a look into a selection of African Proverbs to show the religious and ethical practices passed down through oral tradition

- The Prayers of African Religion . London: SPCK (October 1975). ISBN 0-281-02871-0

An in-depth look into African American Christianity meditation rituals incantations and prayers connection to the divine power.

- Bible and Theology in African Christianity. Oxford University Press (April 1987). ISBN 0-19-572593-X
- African Proverbs. Pretoria: UNISA Press (1997).
- The Kikamba Bible - Utianiyo Mweu Wa Mwiyai Yesu Kilisto (the New Testament of the Lord Jesus Christ), (December 2014) Kenya Literature Bureau.
