= John Hay Munro =

Scottish-American pastor (born 1948)

- Born: 1948 (age 77–78); Rosyth, Scotland
- Education: Dallas Theological Seminary (Doctor of Ministry) and University of Edinburgh (Bachelor of Laws)
- Occupations: Senior pastor, Calvary Church
- Years active: 1984–present
- Spouse: Gudny Munro
- Children: Christopher

John H. Munro is the senior pastor of Calvary Church in Charlotte, North Carolina. He is an author, speaker and radio commentator.

== Early life and education ==
John Hay Munro was born on 10 January 1948 to Thomas and Ruth Munro in the town of Rosyth, Scotland. Thomas was a civil servant and Ruth was a homemaker for their six sons. John became a Christian while attending a youth evangelical camp in 1960. His wife Gudny is from the Faroe Islands, and they met while she was visiting Scotland on a mission trip.

Munro first earned his Bachelor of Laws degree from the University of Edinburgh. After graduation, Munro was a criminal prosecutor in Edinburgh for several years until joining a private law firm, where he specialised in litigation.

In 1981, Munro moved to the US and began attending Dallas Theological Seminary for a Master of Theology degree (completed in 1985). Munro later returned to Dallas Theological Seminary to earn a Doctor of Ministry degree in 1993 with a dissertation in pastoral leadership.

== Ministry ==
Munro was the pastor of South Hills Bible Chapel in Pittsburgh, Pennsylvania, from 1985 to 1992. During that time, he was a pastor to professional American football players Craig Wolfley, Mike Webster and Tunch Ilkin. Munro next spent 4 years in Nova Scotia as pastor of Grace Chapel, and then 10 years as the senior pastor of Calvary Bible Church in Kalamazoo, Michigan. In 2006, Munro was named the senior pastor of Calvary Church in Charlotte, North Carolina, where he continues to serve. As of 2014 the church was the largest in Charlotte.

In 2014, Munro was accused of a violation of the church employee handbook. Without publicly providing details, church elders placed him on paid leave, pending the outcome of an external investigation, and international media ministry Back to the Bible terminated its relationship with Munro over accusations of similar misconduct. Although it was determined that there was no evidence of any violation of policy, Calvary Church did acknowledge that "Munro used judgment that did not align with the high expectations to which church leaders are held." At his first address to his congregation upon full reinstatement, Munro received a standing ovation, and said that he had made an unspecified "innocent error of judgment that while was neither unlawful nor sinful, failed to demonstrate the judgment the church expect[ed]" of him.

Munro currently hosts an internationally syndicated daily and weekly 25-minute radio program called The Verdict, in addition to his pastoral duties. Munro has also been a regular columnist for Decision Magazine and has written a monthly column for the South Charlotte Weekly. Munro is a regular speaker at the Billy Graham Evangelistic Association's conference and retreat facility The Cove, and was an invited speaker at Southern Evangelical Seminary's 2016 Apologetics Conference, hosted by Calvary Church.
