= Evangelical Free Church of America =

Evangelical Christian denomination

- Classification: Protestant
- Orientation: Evangelical
- Theology: Radical Pietistic
- Polity: Free Church and Congregationalist
- Associations: National Association of Evangelicals; International Federation of Free Evangelical Churches
- Region: United States
- Headquarters: Bloomington, Minnesota, US
- Origin: June 1950; Minneapolis, Minnesota, US
- Separated from: Lutheranism
- Branched from: Mission Friends
- Merger of: Swedish Evangelical Free Church and Norwegian-Danish Evangelical Free Church Association
- Separations: Evangelical Free Church of Canada
- Congregations: 1,600
- Members: 180,000
- Official website: efca.org
- Slogan: Multiplying Transformational Churches Among All People

The Evangelical Free Church of America (EFCA) is an evangelical Christian denomination in the Radical Pietistic tradition. The EFCA was formed in 1950 from the merger of the Swedish Evangelical Free Church and the Norwegian-Danish Evangelical Free Church Association. It is affiliated with the International Federation of Free Evangelical Churches.

== History ==
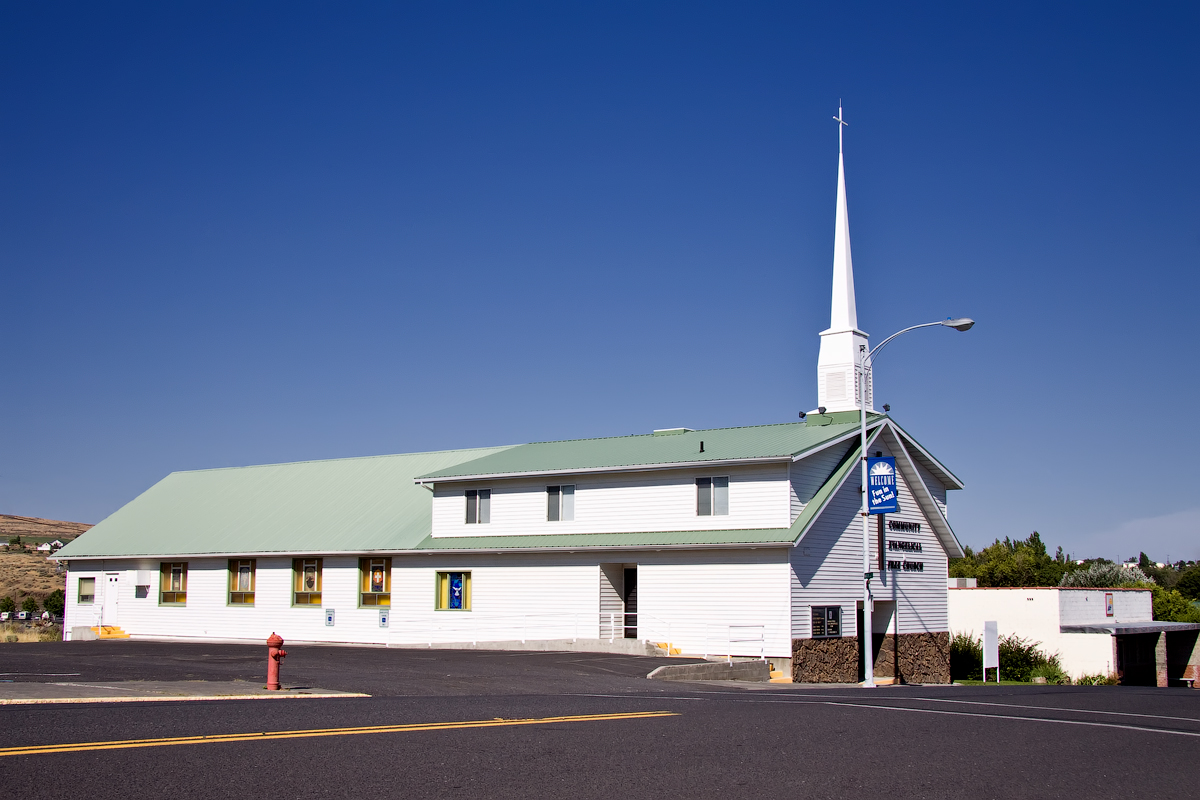
Community Evangelical Free Church of Soap Lake, Washington

The Swedish Evangelical Free Church formed from a number of Free Mission Friends as the Swedish Evangelical Free Mission in Boone, Iowa, in October 1884. Several churches that had been members of the Swedish Evangelical Lutheran Ansgar Synod and the Swedish Evangelical Lutheran Mission Synod, along with some independent congregations, were instrumental in organizing this voluntary fellowship. In the same year, two Norwegian-Danish groups in Boston, Massachusetts, and Tacoma, Washington, began to fellowship together. By 1912, they had formed the Norwegian-Danish Evangelical Free Church Association. The Swedish and Norwegian-Danish bodies united in June 1950 at a merger conference held at the Medicine Lake Conference Grounds near Minneapolis, Minnesota. The two bodies represented 275 local congregations at the time of the merger.

The EFCA shares some early ties with those who formed the Swedish Evangelical Covenant Church as they both came from Mission Friends groups. It has been a member of the National Association of Evangelicals since 1943, the year after that organization was formed.

== Beliefs ==
In its Statement of Faith, the Evangelical Free Church of America affirms the authority and inerrancy of the Bible; the Trinity; atonement through the sacrifice of Jesus Christ; original sin; Christ as head of the church and the local church's right to self government; the personal and imminent return of Christ; the bodily resurrection of the dead; and the two ordinances of water baptism and the Lord's Supper. The denomination, within its own Statement of Faith and FAQ, claims to be most similar to the Baptist tradition, but prefers to use "baptist" with a lowercase "b" as a minor non-primary descriptor due to it primarily although not exclusively embracing the Baptist doctrine on credobaptism, while leaving some allowances for the use of paedobaptism because of its early history having origins within Lutheranism, and having had an influx of former Methodists and Presbyterians in the denomination's early days.

The EFCA passed a substantial revision to its Statement of Faith on June 26, 2008, the first revision since the Statement was first adopted in 1950. This revision was proposed in order "to update archaic language, to clarify some theological ambiguities, to seek greater theological precision, to address new issues, to have a SoF that would be better suited to be used as a teaching tool in our churches." Specific beliefs based on biblical interpretation can vary somewhat due to the congregational governance system that gives autonomy to individual local EFCA churches.

The EFCA does not ordain women. The church describes its stance on homosexuality and same-sex marriage as "welcoming but not affirming," stating that the church "will not credential one who engages in homosexual conduct or one who does not believe that homosexual behavior is sinful, even though remaining celibate."

== Structure ==
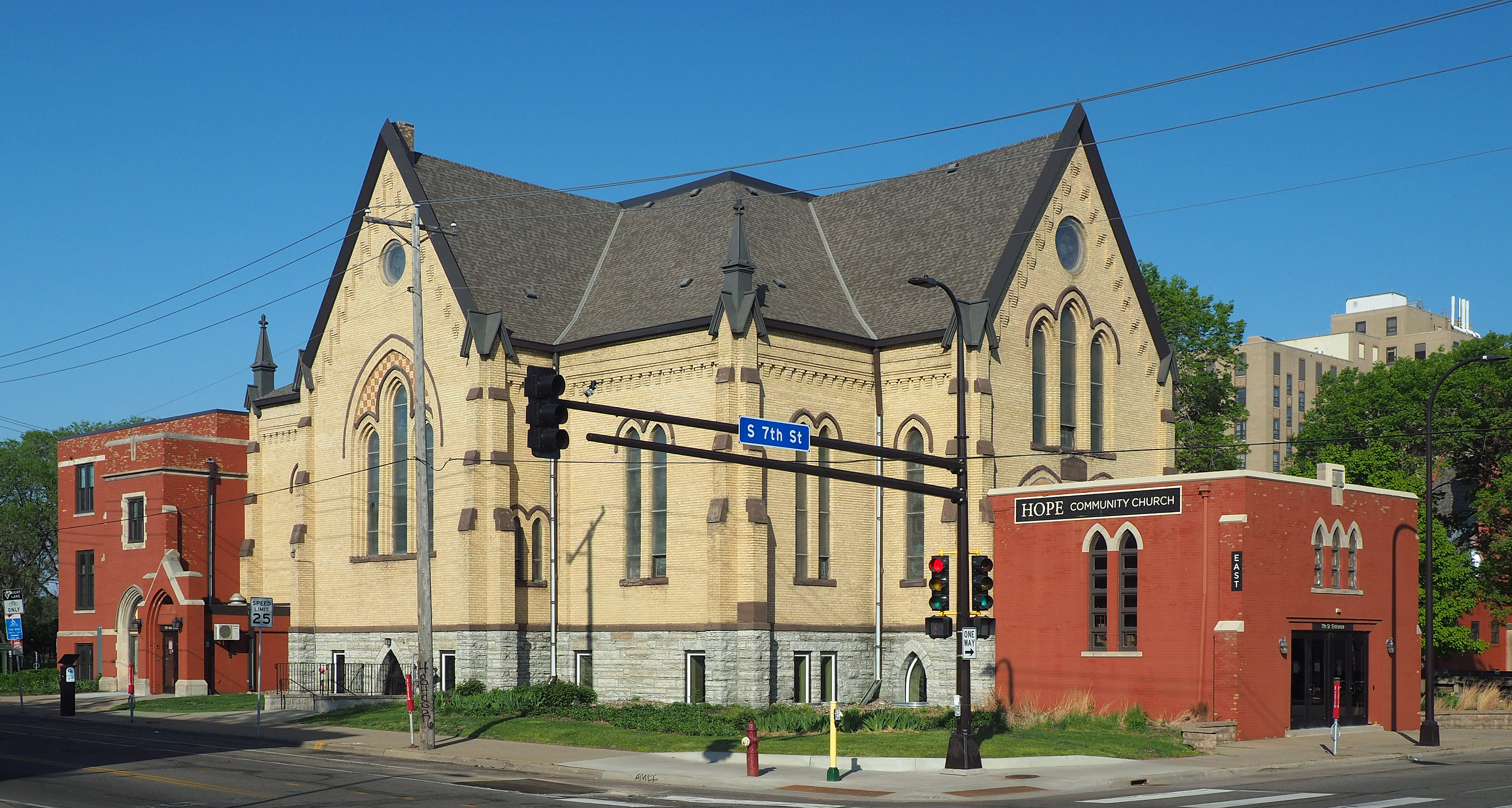
An Evangelical Free church in Minneapolis

The word Free in the Evangelical Free Church's name refers to its congregational polity, meaning each member church is autonomous, and to its history, meaning that the free churches were free from state control. The governing body of the EFCA is the Leadership Conference held annually. Delegates to the conference are credentialed ministers, chaplains, tenured university faculty, and representatives of each EFCA church. The Leadership Conference elects the board of directors which acts as the governing body between Leadership Conference meetings. As chair of the Directional Team, the President coordinates the work of the various national boards and ministries. The office of the President has responsibility for reviewing the licensing and ordaining of ministers and, in addition, oversees the discipline and restoration process for pastors.

The EFCA is divided into 17 regional districts which, among other responsibilities, examines and approves applicants for ordination. The denomination maintains headquarters in suburban Minneapolis, Minnesota, and engages in ministries in education, publications, senior housing, children's homes, and camp facilities. The EFCA supports the mission of Trinity International University and Trinity Evangelical Divinity School in Deerfield, Illinois; Trinity Law School in Santa Ana, California; and supports Trinity Western University in Langley, British Columbia, Canada.

The Evangelical Free Church is a member of the International Federation of Free Evangelical Churches.

== Membership trends ==
In 1950 there were 20,000 members and under 300 congregations. By the 1980s there were over 800 congregations and over 100,000 members. In 2003, the Association reported 300,000 members in over 1,400 congregations. In 2014, the EFCA reported a weekly attendance of 371,191 in 1,500 congregations. In the United States there are 1,314 EFCA churches and 176 church plants with 270 multi-ethnic churches and 102 multi-site or second language services. Close to 550 missionaries serve in more than 80 countries. As of 2000, California had the largest number of congregations with 175. However, membership is primarily concentrated in the Midwest.

=== Notable members ===
- Walter Kaiser Jr., Gordon-Conwell Theological Seminary President Emeritus and Old Testament professor
- D. A. Carson, Trinity International University Emeritus professor of New Testament
- Chuck Swindoll, Dallas Theological Seminary former president
- Cathy McMorris Rodgers, the U.S. representative for Washington's 5th congressional district since 2005.
- Bernard Palmer, author and creator of the Danny Orlis series
- Tina Wesson, winner of Survivor: The Australian Outback, is a member and occasional speaker
- Colin Smith, pastor, author, and council member of The Gospel Coalition
- Darren Carlson, pastor, founder of Training Leaders International, producer of Jesus in Athens

=== Presidents ===
- E. A. Halleen: 1950–1951
- A. T. Olson: 1951–1976
- Tom McDill: 1976–1990
- Paul Cedar: 1990–1996
- William Hamel: 1996–2015 (1996 Interim, 1997 President)
- Kevin Kompelien: 2015–2024
- Carlton P. Harris: 2024–present

== See also ==
- Evangelical Free Church of Canada
- Evangelical Free Church of China
