= Grace University =

Former private university in Omaha, Nebraska, U.S.

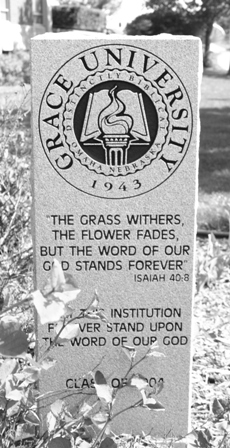
- Dedication stone in the courtyard
- Former names: Grace Bible Institute
- Type: Private university
- Active: August 1943–July 1, 2018
- Religious affiliation: Interdenominational Christian
- Location: 1311 South Ninth Street, Omaha, Nebraska, 68108-3629, U.S. 41.2442°N 95.9280°W
- Campus: Urban
- Nickname: Royals
- Sporting affiliations: NCCAA Central
- Website: www.graceuniversity.edu

Grace University was a private Christian university in Omaha, Nebraska, United States. The university included undergraduate programs and the Grace University College of Professional and Graduate Studies. Grace University was formed in 1943 as the Grace Bible Institute and succeeded the former Presbyterian Theological Seminary. The school re-branded to its final name in 1995. It was dissolved due to financial struggles in 2018.

== History ==
Grace University was established in 1943 as the Grace Bible Institute. The school replaced and occupied the former space of the Presbyterian Theological Seminary, which was dissolved by the General Assembly in Detroit, Michigan in 1942. The school's opening year started on September 8, 1943. In 1977, the college purchased the former St. Catherine's Hospital Center for Continuing Care and was used for dormitories and offices. The institute later re-branded to the Grace College of the Bible in 1979.

In May 1995, Grace College of the Bible became a university, re-branding to Grace University. Additionally, the university began offering more master's degree programs. In 1996, Grace University's oldest building, Old Main, previously known as Brownell Hall, was condemned by the City of Omaha. Brownell Hall was built in 1886 by the Episcopalian Church and underwent several ownership changes before being used as the campus of the current university. It was later demolished in 1997.

By the mid-2010's the college began struggling financially, running a $2.1 million deficit in 2015. The college had attempted to sell off parts of the campus to Omaha Public Schools and move to the former Dana College's campus in Blair, Nebraska. However, these plans failed, and in 2017, Grace University officially announced that it would dissolve the following year. The university dissolved at the end of the academic year and the rest of the campus was sold to Omaha Public Schools.

Following the university's closure, the school's transcripts were transferred to the University of Nebraska–Lincoln for access by former students. That same year, alumni of Grace University attempted to form a successor to the university on the former Dana College campus. However, that same group downsized their plans and the university ultimately failed to open. Omaha Public Schools opened Pine Elementary School on the former campus of Grace University in 2022.

=== Presidents ===
No.	Name	Term	Ref
1 (Note: Originally Kuhlmann's title was only acting president, but Grace University retroactively counted him as its first president.)	Paul Kuhlmann	1943–1944	
2	Cornelius H. Suckau	1944–1951	
3	Harold D. Burkholder	1950–1955 (Note: Burkholder initially served as acting president from 1950 to 1952 during a leave of absence taken by Suckau and after his death in 1951.)	
4	Joseph W. Schmidt	1955–1960 (Note: Schmidt initially served as interim president 1955–1956.)	
5	Daniel J. Unruh	1960–1961 (Note: Unruh briefly served as interim president in 1960.)	
6	Waldo E. Harder	1961–1971 (Note: Harder initially served as interim president 1961–1962.)	
7	Robert W. Benton	1971–1984 (Note: Benton initially served as acting president from July to October of 1971.)	
8	Warren E. Bathke	1984–1993	
9	Neal F. McBride	1993–1997	
10	James P. Eckman	1997–2012 (Note: Eckman initially served as interim president from August to November of 1997 before accepting the full-time position.)	
11	David M. Barnes	2012–2016	
–	Thomas Roche	2016	
–	John D. Holmes	2016–2017	
12 (Note: Bauhard, Grace University's CEO, was the leader of the school in its final year.)	William L. Bauhard	2017–2018	

== Campus ==
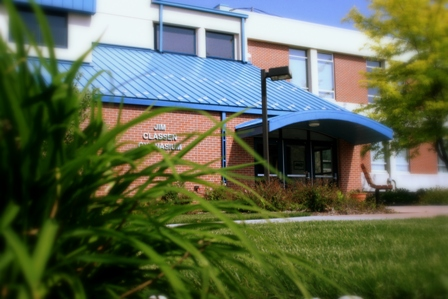
The entrance to the Jim Classen Gymnasium in 2007.

Grace University's campus was in Omaha, Nebraska, United States. Before the university's closure, the campus included four buildings. Major buildings included the Jim Classen Gymnasium, Harold D. Burkholder Center, Schmidt Hall, and the Suckau Chapel. The campus also included the Brownell Hall, which was built in 1886 and demolished in 1997. Following its closure, the campus was sold to Omaha Public Schools and was converted into Pine Elementary School.

== Academics ==
Grace University was accredited by the Higher Learning Commission. From the original three majors offered, Grace has grown to offer more than 40 undergraduate degrees and four graduate degrees. Popular programs included business, intercultural studies, communication, pastoral ministries, psychology, music, and teacher education. Approximately 500 students attended near its closing. Facilities included a state-of-the-art library, a new gym (which hosted the NCCAA Division II Volleyball National Championships in 2007 and 2008), a newly remodeled teacher education wing, and WiFi across campus.

== Demographics ==
Enrollment for the final (2017–18) academic year was 287 students, only 33 of whom were freshmen, according to University CEO Bill Bauhard. This was 100 fewer than the previous year and about 50 fewer freshmen than anticipated, contributing to its announced closure at the end of the academic year, according to Bauhard. A 2013 statistical report from Grace University revealed that of the 481 students enrolled, 23% reported themselves as being ethnic minorities. The top five states represented by the student body at the time were Nebraska, Iowa, Kansas, California and Colorado. In 2013, 97 students graduated with bachelor's degrees, 19 with master's degrees, and 10 with associate degrees.

Grace University also offered an online and on-campus accelerated adult degree completion program for those who were not able to attend traditional undergraduate courses. The Midwestern Higher Education Compact Research Brief 2013 reported that Grace University was ranked Very High for institutional efficiency based on a 4-year graduation rate and ranked second out of 18 independent colleges and universities in Nebraska. The school was ranked Moderate for 6-year graduation rates.

== Athletics ==
As a member of the National Christian College Athletic Association (NCCAA), Grace offered sports including basketball, volleyball, and soccer. They also briefly offered men's baseball for several years. The Lady Royals Volleyball team was named Division II National Champions of the NCCAA in 2005. In 2007 and 2008, Grace University hosted the NCCAA Division II Volleyball National Championship. The Royals' head coach Courtney Moore played for Grace from 2005 to 2008 and was an assistant coach for two seasons. In the six seasons Coach Moore had been a part of Grace volleyball, the team has competed at the National level five times to bring home two final four finishes, one National Runner-up finish and one National Championship. The men's soccer team made consecutive appearances in the NCCAA National Tournament in 2002 and 2003.

== Values ==
Similar to other private religious schools in the state, Grace University's code of conduct provided students guidelines about morally acceptable behavior: no kissing, no prolonged hugs and no premarital sex. The school also forbid certain television channels which they assert consistently air material contrary to their values. HBO, MTV, and Comedy Central were among the restricted channels "because of the values they promote". The rules are laid out in a student handbook signed by students every year." The Resident Assistants and Deans were charged with upholding the school's code of conduct and holding the students accountable to the university's standards.

Ronald Kroll, who heads the accreditation commission for the Association for Biblical Higher Education (ABHE) in Orlando, said it shouldn't be surprising that schools like Grace University have strict rules on a wide range of issues: sex, alcohol, drugs, tobacco, pornography, and gambling. "It's the essence of who they are," Kroll said. "Since these institutions, by and large, are preparing people for biblical ministry or spiritual engagement, they have lifestyle expectations. These are non-negotiable issues."

=== Lesbian student expulsion controversy ===
During its operation, Grace University received federal Title IV funding under the Higher Education Act of 1965. This prohibited it from discriminating against individuals protected by the Civil Rights Act of 1964, including racial, ethnic, national and religious minorities, and women. However, this does not prohibit discrimination against students based on sex or gender identity, and Grace University received national attention in 2013 after it expelled a lesbian student on the basis of her sexual orientation. Danielle Powell, who was in a prohibited same-sex relationship at the time, was expelled during her last semester at Grace when the university found she had violated the terms of the school's probationary yearlong restoration program. Powell had finished less than 60 percent of the semester when probation began. According to Title IV government requirements, when a student withdraws before that mark, the school must return government scholarship money, leaving her owing a $6300 bill. Despite that, Grace University clearly stated in writing that it was willing to provide transcripts and help Powell transfer to another university, according to Michael James, the school's executive vice president. All students, before admission, were required to sign a document affirming their willingness to abide by the university's community standards, which included a prohibition of same-sex romantic relationships.
