= Meno, Oklahoma =

- Town
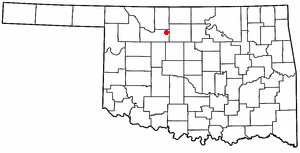
- Location in Oklahoma
- Coordinates: 36°23′18″N 98°10′41″W
- Country: United States
- State: Oklahoma
- County: Major

Area
  - Total: 0.19 sq mi (0.50 km^{2})
  - Land: 0.19 sq mi (0.50 km^{2})
  - Water: 0 sq mi (0.00 km^{2})
- Elevation: 1,345 ft (410 m)

Population (2020)
  - Total: 198
  - Density: 1,032.2/sq mi (398.55/km^{2})
- Time zone: UTC-6 (Central (CST))
  - Summer (DST): UTC-5 (CDT)
- ZIP Code: 73760
- Area code: 580
- FIPS code: 40-47750
- GNIS feature ID: 2412983

Meno is a town in Major County, Oklahoma, United States. The population was 198 at the 2020 census, down from 235 in 2010.

== History ==
The town of Meno is named after Mennonite leader Menno Simons, and was founded on October 19, 1899 by David Koehn, who omitted one "n" when filling out the Post Office application form. Jacob A. Wedel served as the first postmaster. Meno was originally part of Woods County, until statehood in 1907, at which time it fell within Major County. Many of the original inhabitants were Mennonites of Polish and Russian Mennonite descent. who established the New Hopedale Mennonite Church. It was the previous home of the Oklahoma Bible Academy, originally established in 1911 by the New Hopedale Mennonite Church as Meno Preparatory School, until it was moved to nearby Enid in 1983.

In 1901-1902, the Enid and Anadarko Railway (later the Chicago, Rock Island and Pacific Railroad) constructed a line to connect the cities of Enid and Greenfield, which passed through Meno. The first census in 1910 reported 69 residents. By 1918, the town boasted a bank, flour mill, two creameries, and two grain elevators.

Meno now serves as a bedroom community for people who commute to work in the Enid area.

== Geography ==
Meno is located in eastern Major County, 17 miles (27 km) west of Enid, 4 miles (6 km) east of Ringwood, and 23 miles (37 km) northeast of Fairview, the Major county seat. Combined U.S. Route 60 and 412 run east-west through the northern side of town.

According to the U.S. Census Bureau, the town of Meno has a total area of 0.19 square miles (0.49 km^{2}), all land. The town is drained to the south by tributaries of Hoyle Creek, itself a south-flowing tributary of the Cimarron River.

== Demographics ==
Historical population
Census	Pop.	Note	%±
1910	69		—
1920	92		33.3%
1930	96		4.3%
1940	180		87.5%
1950	76		−57.8%
1960	118		55.3%
1970	119		0.8%
1980	171		43.7%
1990	155		−9.4%
2000	195		25.8%
2010	235		20.5%
2020	198		−15.7%
U.S. Decennial Census

=== 2020 census ===
As of the 2020 census, Meno had a population of 198. The median age was 35.7 years. 28.8% of residents were under the age of 18 and 15.7% of residents were 65 years of age or older. For every 100 females there were 83.3 males, and for every 100 females age 18 and over there were 88.0 males age 18 and over.

0.0% of residents lived in urban areas, while 100.0% lived in rural areas.

There were 71 households in Meno, of which 49.3% had children under the age of 18 living in them. Of all households, 59.2% were married-couple households, 7.0% were households with a male householder and no spouse or partner present, and 21.1% were households with a female householder and no spouse or partner present. About 14.1% of all households were made up of individuals and 5.6% had someone living alone who was 65 years of age or older.

There were 87 housing units, of which 18.4% were vacant. The homeowner vacancy rate was 1.9% and the rental vacancy rate was 8.0%.

Racial composition as of the 2020 census
Race	Number	Percent
White	143	72.2%
Black or African American	2	1.0%
American Indian and Alaska Native	3	1.5%
Asian	0	0.0%
Native Hawaiian and Other Pacific Islander	0	0.0%
Some other race	33	16.7%
Two or more races	17	8.6%
Hispanic or Latino (of any race)	67	33.8%

=== 2000 census ===
As of the census of 2000, there were 195 people, 78 households, and 56 families residing in the town. The population density was 1,036.7 inhabitants per square mile (400.3/km^{2}). There were 87 housing units at an average density of 462.5 per square mile (178.6/km^{2}). The racial makeup of the town was 92.82% White, 1.03% Native American, 2.05% from other races, and 4.10% from two or more races. Hispanic or Latino of any race were 3.59% of the population.

There were 78 households, out of which 33.3% had children under the age of 18 living with them, 69.2% were married couples living together, 2.6% had a female householder with no husband present, and 28.2% were non-families. 26.9% of all households were made up of individuals, and 20.5% had someone living alone who was 65 years of age or older. The average household size was 2.50 and the average family size was 3.04.

In the town, the population distribution was as follows: 26.7% were under the age of 18, 5.6% were between 18 and 24, 25.6% were between 25 and 44, 18.5% were between 45 and 64, and 23.6% were 65 or older. The median age was 40 years. For every 100 females, there were 85.7 males. For every 100 females aged 18 and over, there were 88.2 males.

The median income for a household in the town was $32,750, and the median income for a family was $35,000. Males had a median income of $30,500 versus $19,688 for females. The per capita income for the town was $20,697. None of the families and 1.7% of the population were living below the poverty line, including no under eighteens and 7.0% of those over 64.
