= Charles E. Hummel =

American academic administrator

Charles E. Hummel (1923–2004) was a writer, president of Barrington College, and director of faculty ministries at InterVarsity Christian Fellowship.

Born in Minneapolis, Hummel grew up in Plainfield, NJ. A graduate of Yale University, he earned an M.S. in chemical engineering from MIT and an M.A. from Wheaton College (Illinois). He worked for InterVarsity Christian Fellowship from 1956 to 1965. From 1965 to74, he was president of Barrington College. In 1975 he became director of faculty ministries for InterVarsity Christian Fellowship.

He was married to Anne Childs Hummel; the couple had four children.

== Notable work ==
Hummel wrote numerous books and several Bible studies, some of which he co-authored with his wife Anne C. Hummel.

Hummel is known for his essay, "Tyranny of the Urgent", published in 1967 as a booklet by InterVarsity Press, which became popular as guide to time management and personal productivity in both ministry and business circles, and has since undergone periodic updates and revisions. In 1997 he published "Freedom from Tyranny of the Urgent", an expansion upon his original work.

== Selected bibliography ==
- A Pure Heart: The Window to God Co-authored by Charles and Anne Hummel.
- Campus Christian Witness: an Inter-varsity Christian Fellowship Manual. Chicago: Inter-varsity Press, c1958
- Creation or Evolution?: Resolving Crucial Issues
- Doubters Welcome
- Filled with the Spirit
- Fire in the Fireplace
- Freedom from Tyranny of the Urgent
- Genesis: God's Creative Call. Co-authored by Charles and Anne Hummel.
- Healing
- Priorities
- The Galileo Connection : Resolving conflicts between science and the Bible. Chicago: IVP, 1986.
- The Search: Studies for pondering the know-why of existence
- Tyranny of the Urgent
- Spiritual gifts: 12 studies for individuals or groups. Co-authored by Charles and Anne Hummel.
- Making peace: resolving personal conflict. Co-authored by Charles and Anne Hummel. Grand Rapids: Zondervan Pub. House, ©1993
