= Ronald H. Nash =

American philosopher and theologian

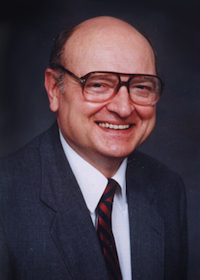
- Born: May 27, 1936; Cleveland, Ohio, US
- Died: March 10, 2006 (aged 69); Orlando, Florida, US
- Education: Barrington College, Brown University, Syracuse University
- Occupation: Professor of Philosophy
- Organization: Reformed Theological Seminary
- Known for: Austrian economics, Philosophy of history, Classical apologetics
- Spouse: Betty Jane Nash
- Children: Jeffrey, Jennifer

Ronald H. Nash (May 27, 1936 – March 10, 2006) was a philosophy professor at Reformed Theological Seminary. Nash served as a professor for over 40 years, teaching and writing in the areas of worldview, apologetics, ethics, theology, and history. He is known for his advocacy of Austrian economics, and his criticism of the evangelical left.

== Biography ==
Ronald Herman Nash was born in Cleveland, Ohio on May 27, 1936. In 1956, Nash received ordination. He pastored both Baptist and Presbyterian churches. He earned his bachelor's degree at Barrington College, and a master's degree at Brown University, before going on to receive his Doctorate in Philosophy from Syracuse University in 1964. He did postdoctoral work at Stanford University in 1969.

Following his doctoral work, Nash became the Chairman of the Department of Philosophy and Religion and Director of Graduate Studies in Humanities at Western Kentucky University, where he served for 27 years. In 1991, he became Professor of Philosophy and Theology at Reformed Theological Seminary, serving there until 2002. Additionally, Nash was Professor of Philosophy at the Southern Baptist Theological Seminary from 1998 to 2005.

From 1988 to 1991, Nash was an advisor to the U.S. Civil Rights Commission. In 1991 and 1992, he lectured in Moscow on the subject of God and economics. In 1998, Nash conducted a speaking tour of New Zealand. He was also an advisor for the DreamWorks Animation movie, The Prince of Egypt. He taught overseas classes, World Views in Hong Kong and Church History in London.

Nash died on March 10, 2006, due to complications from a stroke. He was survived by his wife, Betty Jane, and children, Jeffrey and Jennifer. A public memorial service in Nash's honor was held at the Orlando campus of the Reformed Theological Seminary.

== Thought ==
=== Religious particularism ===
Nash was a proponent of Biblical Christianity in regard to salvation. He argued that one had to possess explicit belief in Jesus in order to obtain salvation. He argues that John 3:16–18 makes it explicit that all who believe in Jesus will be saved and all who fail to believe will not be saved.

=== Liberation theology ===
Nash was the editor of On Liberation Theology, as well as one of its contributors. In this book he argues that liberation theology consists of 3 claims.

1. Christians ought to become politically active on behalf of the poor and oppressed.
2. The major cause of poverty and oppression in the world is capitalism.
3. Christians should attack capitalism and see it replaced by socialism.

Nash agrees with the first claim, but argues that attacking capitalism and seeing it replaced by socialism will achieve precisely the opposite goals sought out by liberation theologians, arguing that socialism as a means of liberation is both tragic and ironic. Liberation theologians have rejected the one system that offers real economic hope for the masses they wish to assist. Instead, they have taken a path that will not only deny their people food but also deprive them of liberty due to socialism's central control. According to Nash, when such a movement calls itself liberation theology, the label is truly ironic.

=== Socialism ===
Nash states that the majority of academics in his day had a strong bias against capitalism. People blamed capitalism for nearly every evil in contemporary society including greed, selfishness, materialism, fraudulent behavior, the debasement of society's tastes, the pollution of the environment, alienation, despair, and the vast disparities of wealth. Even racism and sexism are treated as effects of capitalism.

Nash argued that criticisms of capitalism were really just slogans unsupported by anything resembling evidence. An undesirable feature is noted in an alleged capitalistic society, and one where a market economy supposedly functions. Then it is simply asserted that capitalism is the cause of this problem. This is known in logic as the fallacy of false cause. Mere coincidence does not prove a causal connection. Such critics of capitalism conveniently overlook the fact that the features of capitalist societies they find so offensive also exist in socialist societies.

Socialism is an umbrella term, often referring to economies with centralized control. Nash argued that the main flaw in all forms of socialism has been recognized in the 1920s by Ludwig von Mises. Mises argued that a fully centrally controlled economy can never attune to what people want unless there is a free market. Without markets, there is no way of doing cost accounting. Without cost accounting, there is no way to determine whether a good's value is worth its cost of production. This results in chaos for the economy. The way that socialist countries have been able to avoid this collapse is through monitoring the pricing information in existing free markets, and then applying this information to set prices in their own economies.

The great paradox of socialism is the fact that socialism needs capitalism in order to survive. Unless socialist economies allow for some free markets which provide the pricing information possible, socialist economies would soon collapse. Von Mises' claims were strengthened by the fact that this is exactly what happened in cases such as the Soviet Union, where socialist states attempted to abolish all markets. The result is that no socialism in practice can dispense with market exchanges. Consequently, socialism attacks the market at the same time it is forced to utilize the market process.

=== The mixed economy ===
Sometimes called interventionism, the mixed economy is a compromise or mix, between capitalism and socialism. Most countries that we identify as "capitalist" and "socialist" are really different degrees of a mixed economy. Nash argues that there can never be a sustainable mixed economy. Any economy that tries to mix socialism and capitalism will inevitably collapse into one of the two.

=== Christian left ===
Nash is a critic of the Christian left, particularly Jim Wallis, Ron Sider, and Tony Campolo. He argues that this group has good intentions for helping the poor, but flawed economic theory. He states that the criticisms generally leveled against capitalism are in fact criticisms of government intrusion into market activities. He argues that economic exchanges come in two varieties: by peaceful means and by violent means. The former can be stated as "if you do something good for me, I will do something good for you." The latter can be stated as "if you do not do something good for me, I will do something bad for you." Government intervention into the economy, such as by income taxes, are part of the latter system, and not the former. He states that socialism, by definition, cannot be voluntary, since under socialism, capital is either owned or controlled by the state. Nash states that the problem with this system is that it shuts off important signals that entrepreneurs might otherwise use in making economic decisions. When the government owns the land, labor, utilities, factory, and other factors of production, it becomes impossible to tell how much it costs to produce a good or service. The Soviet Union was able to function because it sent spies to capitalist nations to obtain pricing information.

Capitalism, Nash argues, is not economic anarchy. He states that capitalism is a system of voluntary relationships which protect people's rights against force, fraud, theft, and violations of contract. Nash states that the Christian left argues that capitalism encourages greed. Nash retorts that capitalism is the one mechanism that neutralizes greed, as it forces people to find ways of serving the needs of those with whom they wish to exchange. As long as greedy people are prohibited from introducing force, fraud, and theft into the exchange process and as long as they cannot secure special privileges from the state under interventionist or socialist arrangements, their greed must be channeled into the discovery of products or services for which people are willing to trade.

==== Jim Wallis ====
Nash has criticized Jim Wallis for celebrating what Wallis called the American defeat in the Vietnam War. While Wallis identified as anti-war, Wallis criticized those who protested against the North Vietnamese military campaign and human rights violations. Nash writes "Wallis's response to the Cambodian Communists' slaughter of two million men, women, and children was to deny the bloodbath and blame whatever else might happen on the United States. Wallis, Nash argues, did the same for the Soviet Union, refusing to condemn the Soviet invasion of Afghanistan, instead believing that America posed the greatest threat to world peace.

Nash argued that despite claiming to be a moderate, Wallis actually holds a Marxist worldview, since Wallis argued in his document The Road To Damascus that anti-Communist Christians are members of the forces of darkness and should convert to Marxism.

==== Ron Sider ====
According to Nash, Ron Sider influenced the leadership of evangelical Christian colleges. One college president stated publicly that he would not hire any faculty for his school who were not in sympathy with Sider's position on Rich Christians in an Age of Hunger.

== Bibliography ==
- Life's Ultimate Questions. Zondervan. July 27, 1999. ISBN 0310223644.
- Is Jesus the Only Savior?. Zondervan. July 12, 1994. ISBN 0310443911.
- Worldviews in Conflict: Choosing Christianity in a World of Ideas. Zondervan. July 28, 1992. ISBN 0310577713.
- The Gospel and the Greeks: Did the New Testament Borrow from Pagan Thought?. P&R Publishing. February 1, 2003. ISBN 0875525598.
- Faith and Reason. Zondervan. April 26, 1994. ISBN 0310294010.
- Social Justice and the Christian Church. CSS Publishing. January 10, 2002. ISBN 0788099167.
- The Meaning of History. B&H Academic. August 1, 1998. ISBN 0805414002.
- The Word of God and the Mind of Man. P&R Publishing. February 1, 1992. ISBN 0875523544.
- The Concept of God. Zondervan. September 9, 1983. ISBN 0310451418.
- Why the Left Is Not Right: The Religious Left : Who They Are and What They Believe. Zondervan. June 1996. ISBN 0310210151.
- Poverty and Wealth: Why Socialism Doesn't Work. W Pub Group. 1996. ISBN 094524116X.
- The Light of the Mind. B&H Academic. January 1, 2003. ISBN 0788099175.
- Christian Faith and Historical Understanding. Probe Ministries International. 1984. ISBN 0310451213.
- When a Baby Dies. Zondervan. February 8, 1999. ISBN 0310225566.
- Christianity and the Hellenistic World. Zondervan. October 1984. ISBN 0310452104.
- The Closing of the American Heart: What's Really Wrong With America's Schools. Probe Ministries International. April 1990. ISBN 0945241119.
- Freedom, Justice and the State. University Press of America. July 31, 1980. ISBN 0819111961.
- Great Divides: Understanding the Controversies That Come Between Christians. Navpress. January 1993. ISBN 0891096965.
- Economic Justice and the State: A Debate Between Ronald H. Nash and Eric H. Beversluis. Baker Pub Group. October 1986. ISBN 0801009278.
- Evangelicals in America: Who They Are, What They Believe. Abingdon Press. March 1987. ISBN 0687121779.
- The Christian Parent & Student Guide to Choosing A College. Wolgemuth & Hyatt Publishing. June 1989. ISBN 0943497566.
