= Warren W. Wiersbe =

American pastor and writer (1929–2019)

- Born: May 16, 1929; East Chicago, Indiana, U.S.
- Died: May 2, 2019 (aged 89)
- Education: Indiana University, Roosevelt University & Northern Baptist Theological Seminary
- Occupations: Pastor, writer
- Writing career
- Period: 1950s–2019
- Subject: Christian theology
- Notable work: Be series of Bible commentaries

Warren Wendall Wiersbe (May 16, 1929 – May 2, 2019) was an American Christian clergyman, Bible teacher, conference speaker and a prolific writer of Christian literature and theological works. Wiersbe is perhaps best known for his series of 50 books in the "BE" series: Be Real, Be Rich, Be Obedient, Be Mature, Be Joyful, etc., and other theological works. He pastored the Moody Church in Chicago (1971–1978) and succeeded Theodore Epp as director of the Back to the Bible radio ministry.

== Early years and education ==
Wiersbe was born on May 16, 1929, in East Chicago, Indiana, the youngest of four children of Fred and Gladys Wiersbe. His mother was of Swedish descent, and his father was of German descent. Wiersbe attended Washington High School in East Chicago, where he became a committed Christian at a Youth for Christ rally there in 1945. After graduation, he studied at Indiana University at the Indianapolis campus, Roosevelt University, and graduated in 1953 from Northern Baptist Theological Seminary in Lombard, Illinois.

== Ministry ==
While attending the seminary, he was ordained as pastor of Central Baptist Church in 1951 and served until 1957. From September 1957 to 1961, Wiersbe served as Director of The Literature Division for Youth for Christ International. From 1961 to 1971 he pastored Calvary Baptist Church of Covington, Kentucky south of Cincinnati, Ohio. The church grew from a church seating a congregation of eight hundred to build a new church seating of two thousand. This church drew members from the Ohio, Indiana and Kentucky Tri-state Area. His Sunday sermons were broadcast as theCalvary Hour on a local Cincinnati radio station. From 1971 to 1978, Wiersbe pastored Chicago's Moody Church, named for 19th century evangelist Dwight L. Moody. While at Moody Church, he continued in radio ministry as speaker on the Songs in the Night nationally syndicated radio program that moved to Moody Church in 1968. Between August 1979 and March 1982, he wrote bi-weekly for Christianity Today as "Eutychus X". During the same time frame between 1978 and 1982, Wiersbe taught practical theology classes at Trinity Evangelical Divinity School in Deerfield, Illinois and wrote the course material and taught "Imagination and the Quest for Biblical Preaching", a Doctor of Ministry course at Trinity and Dallas Seminary. While pastoring in Chicago, Wiersbe served on the board of Slavic Gospel Association (SGA) from 1971 to 1983, ten of those years he served as chairman of the board. From 1980 to 1992, he went to work for the Back to the Bible radio broadcast and succeeded Theodore Epp as general director the last six years of his time there.

In 1995, Wiersbe became Writer in Residence at Cornerstone University in Grand Rapids, Michigan, and Distinguished Professor of Preaching at Grand Rapids Theological Seminary. A contributing editor to Baker Book House, he wrote books beginning in the 1950s under several publishing house labels; completing more than 150 books including the popular "BE" series of commentaries on every book of the Bible which has sold over four million copies. Most of this information is available through Warren Wiersbe's autobiography Be Myself: Memoirs of a Bridgebuilder.

== Personal life and death ==
Wiersbe married Betty Warren on June 20, 1953; they had met at Northern Baptist Theological Seminary. They had four children. He died on May 2, 2019, aged 89. Before his death, Wiersbe and his wife Betty gifted their massive personal library of over 13,000 volumes to Cedarville University in Ohio.

== Bibliography ==
- 52 workable junior high programs, with Ted W. Engstrom (1960)
- Be a real teenager! (1965)
- Creative Christian living (1967)
- Thoughts for men on the move; strength for the journey (1970)
- Be real (1972)
- When pastors wonder how, with Howard F. Sugden (1973)
- Be successful - 1 Samuel (1973)
- Be joyful; a practical study of Philippians (1974)
- William Culbertson: a man of God (1974)
- Be free : an expository study of Galatians (1975)
- Be rich : are you losing the things that money can't buy? : An expository study of the Epistle to the Ephesians (1976)
- His name is Wonderful (1976, 1984)
- Live like a king : making the Beatitudes work in daily life (1976)
- Walking with the giants : a minister's guide to good reading and great preaching (1976)
- Treasury of the world's great sermons, compilation (1977)
- Be right : an expository study of Romans (1977)
- Best of A. W. Tozer : 52 favorite chapters, compilation of works by Aiden Wilson Tozer, 1897-1963 (1978)
- 5 secrets of living (1978)
- Be mature : an expository study of the Epistle of James (1978)
- Be ready (1979)
- Meet yourself in the parables (1979)
- Strategy of Satan : how to detect and defeat him (1979)
- Annotated Pilgrim's progress / by John Bunyan; with helpful notes, essays on the life and times of John Bunyan, and an index to persons and places and what they mean (1980)
- Listening to the giants : a guide to good reading and great preaching, with sketches by Amy Van Martin (1980)
- Meet your King (1980)
- Anthology of Jesus, arranged and selected by Sir James Marchant, edited (1981)
- Be complete (1981)
- Be faithful : it's always too soon to quit! : an expository study of the Pastoral Epistles, 1 and 2 Timothy and Titus (1981)
- Be challenged (1982)
- Be confident : an expository study of the Epistle to the Hebrews (1982)
- Be hopeful (1982)
- Listen! Jesus is praying : an expository study of John 17 (1982)
- Key Words of the Christian Life (1982)
- Be wise : an expository study of 1 Corinthians (1983)
- Expository Outlines on the new testament
- Making sense of the ministry, with David Wiersbe (1983)
- Meet yourself in the Psalms (1983)
- Classic sermons on suffering, compilation (1984)
- Steps of faith : the NIV New Testament for growing Christians, compilation (1984)
- Be alert (1984)
- Victorious Christians you should know (1984)
- Why us? : when bad things happen to God's people (1984)
- Wycliffe handbook of preaching and preachers, with Lloyd M. Perry (1984)
- Classic sermons on faith and doubt, compilation (1985)
- Be victorious (1985)
- Comforting the bereaved, with David W. Wiersbe (1985)
- Be Compassionate (1988)
- Run with the winners (1985)
- Be What You Are (1988)
- Be Patient : an Old Testament Study – Job (1991)
- With the Word: the chapter by chapter Bible Handbook (1991)
- Be Comforted : Feeling Secure in the Arms of God : an Old Testament study Isaiah (1992)
- On being a servant of God (1993)
- Be Strong: Putting God’s power to work in your life: an Old Testament study of Joshua (1993)
- Be Decisive: Taking a Stand for the Truth-Jeremiah (1995)
- Be Heroic: Demonstrating Bravery by Your Walk - Ezra, Haggai, Zechariah (1997) Victor Books
- The Cross of Jesus (1997)
- Be Obedient: Abraham (2001) Published by Scripture Press
- Be God's Guest: Feasts of Leviticus 23, The Good News Broadcasting Association, 1992.
- Becoming New (2024) Published by David C. Cook - Edited by his grandson, Dan Jacobsen
