= Horizon House =

Nonprofit organization based in Indianapolis, Indiana, U.S.

- Founded: 1988
- Type: Non-governmental organization
- Purpose: End homelessness
- Location: 1033 E. Washington Street, Indianapolis, IN 46202, United States
- Website: http://www.horizonhouse.cc

The Horizon House is a daytime-only homeless shelter in downtown Indianapolis, Indiana, United States. It is organized as non-profit, with no religious affiliation. Horizon House serves approximately 5000 clients every year.

== About ==
It is located on East Washington Street and Southeastern Avenue, which is 1 mile (1.6 km) from the Soldiers' and Sailors' Monument on Monument Circle. The Horizon House is accessible by public transportation, with IndyGo (Indianapolis Public Transportation Corporation) buses via Route 8.

Horizon House provides services such as health care, mental health services, storage, laundry and job training. The shelter's health care services are especially unique because Horizon House is one of the only providers of physical and mental health to the homeless free of charge in the United States.

Outreach workers from the shelter have provided services beyond the usual scope of a homeless shelter. For example, in the winter of 2015, they helped a homeless man take care of his dog during sub-zero weather.
