= Back to the Bible =

Non-profit Christian organization in the USA

- Formation: 1939
- Website: www.backtothebible.org

Back to the Bible is an international Christian ministry based in Lincoln, Nebraska, United States.

== History ==
=== 1939-1984 ===
Founded in 1939 by Theodore H. Epp on radio station KFOR (AM) in Lincoln, Nebraska, Back to the Bible expanded by supporting missionaries and broadcasting via shortwave radio to other countries. By the mid-1950s, it was being broadcast somewhere in the world in any given minute, and in 1954 the organization's first international Bible teaching ministry office opened in Canada. By the time of Epp's retirement in 1981, the Back to the Bible program was syndicated as a daily 30-minute broadcast on more than 800 radio stations worldwide.

Under Epp's direction, the broadcasts were also noted for music by the Back to the Bible Choir and quartet. Several popular phonograph recordings were made by the choir in the 1940s and 1950s. Back to the Bible also had a weekly youth program on Saturdays, featuring a youth choir and serialized adventures with a Christian theme, such as the Danny Orlis series written by Bernard Palmer. Both the music segments and youth program were discontinued in the 1980s.

By the 1970s the organization had offices in Australia, Canada, Colombia, Costa Rica, Ecuador, England, France, India, Italy, Jamaica, Mexico, the Philippines, South Africa, Sri Lanka and Venezuela.

=== 1984-2013 ===
Warren W. Wiersbe, former pastor of Moody Church in Chicago, Illinois, was appointed as leader of the Lincoln-based ministry in 1984, and served in this capacity until 1989. He was followed by Woodrow Kroll. Back to the Bible had long followed a consistent half‑hour format in which its teachers explained Scripture and its relevance to listeners’ lives. In the early 2000s under Kroll's leadership, the ministry expanded its local presence in Lincoln by sponsoring concerts and extreme‑sports events along with building new youth‑oriented spaces such as a coffeehouse and concert hall.

In late 2007, Kroll announced that he would step down from his duties and that James MacDonald would become president of Back to the Bible. In addition, MacDonald's radio ministry, Walk in the Word, would merge with Back to the Bible. However, in early 2008 Kroll announced that the merger had fallen through, and that he would continue as president.

=== 2013-2025 ===
Back to the Bible announced Woodrow Kroll's retirement in January 2013. Dr John Munro, senior pastor at Calvary Church in Charlotte, North Carolina, became the program's next Bible teacher and served from August 2013. In August 2014 he was removed from this position following a complaint from a member of his church staff; after investigation by the church he was reinstated as senior pastor, but Back to the Bible stood by its decision to dismiss him from his role there.

From August 2014 to June 2016, the daily Back to the Bible program featured Bible teaching from Warren Wiersbe, David Chadwick and Darrell Bock.

In July 2016, Ron Moore, pastor of The Bible Chapel in the Pittsburgh area, was named president and Bible teacher. He served as president until February 2018, and was succeeded by David Platt.

Back to the Bible ceased broadcasting in the United States on the radio in October 2020; it has continued to be produced as a podcast, with the ministry stating that brokered programming fees on most religious stations had made continuing to syndicate the program no longer viable.

== Current Situation (2025-Present) ==
As of 2018 Back to the Bible had offices in nine countries outside the United States, Canada (fiscally and legally autonomous), Ecuador, India (fiscally and legally autonomous), Indonesia, Jamaica (fiscally and legally autonomous), Japan, Nepal, Sri Lanka (fiscally and legally autonomous), Trinidad & Tobago and broadcasts in multiple languages.

As of 2026, Back to the Bible has adopted a three-pillar approach to ministry in the digital age: daily Bible-teaching content, an AI-powered discipleship platform called BTTB.ai, and detailed research through the Center for Scripture Absorption. The ministry's YouTube channel has seen significant growth, growing to an audience of nearly 100,000 subscribers and roughly 250,000 video views each month. The ministry currently produces two daily podcasts: Back to the Bible Daily with Pastor Braden Pedersen, and Spiritually Fit | Today with Dr. Arnie Cole.

As of 2026 the charity has a 3-star rating from Charity Navigator, an independent evaluator of American charities.

== Bible teachers ==
Bible Teacher	Years
Theodore Epp	1939–1980
Warren Wiersbe	1980–1990
Woodrow Kroll	1990–2013
John Munro	2013–2014
Warren Wiersbe (Interim)	2014–2016
David Chadwick (Interim)	2015–2016
Darrell Bock (Interim)	2015–2016
Ron Moore	2016–2018
David Platt	2018–2018
Bryan Clark	2018–2020
Nat Crawford	2020–2023
Braden Pedersen	2025-Present
