= Calvary Church (Charlotte) =

Coordinates: 35.0856°N 80.8135°W

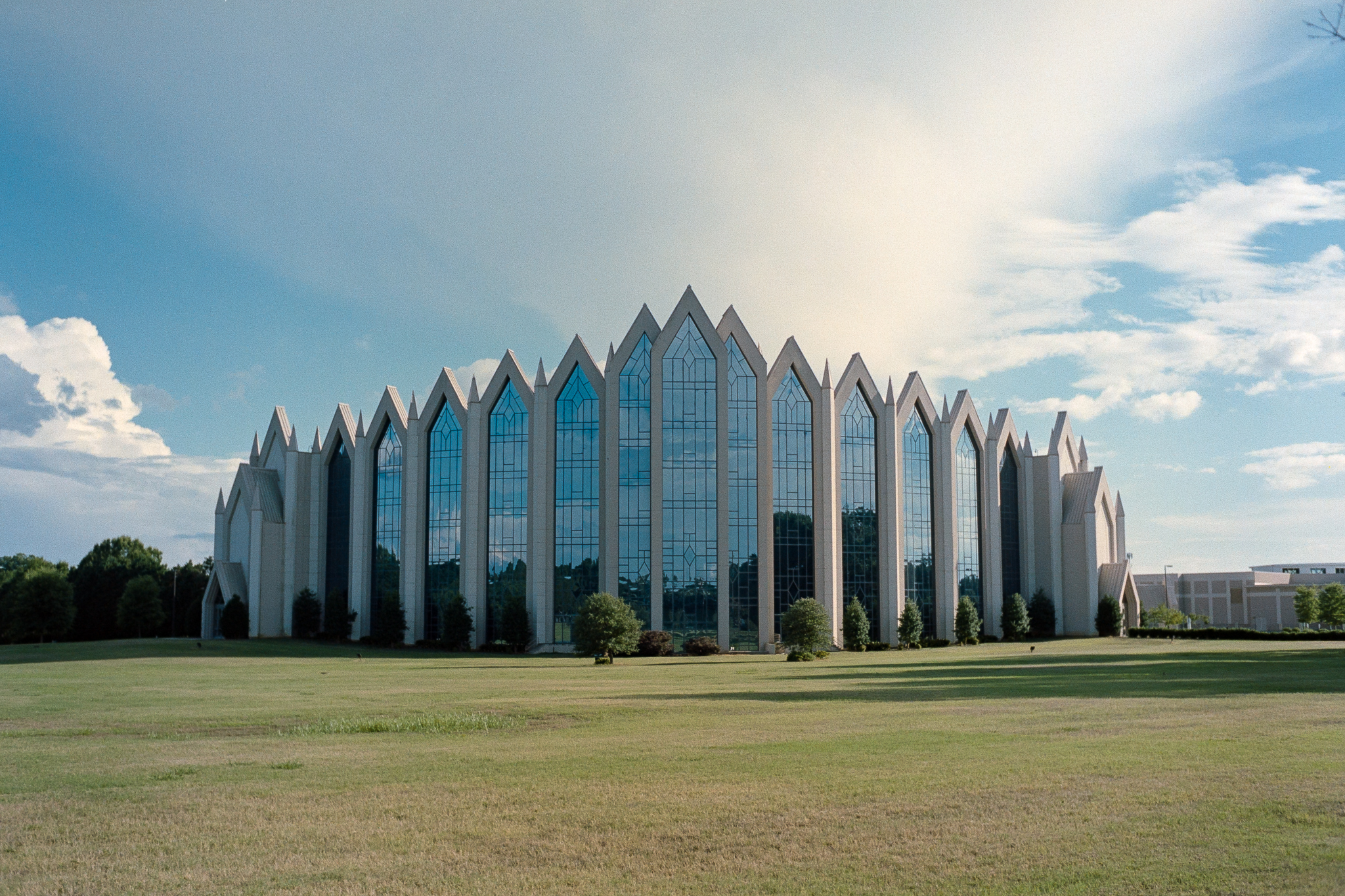
- Calvary Church building
- Calvary Church
- Location: Charlotte, North Carolina
- Country: United States
- Denomination: Non-denominational
- Website: www.calvarychurch.com

History
- Founded: 1939

Calvary Church is a non-denominational church in Charlotte, North Carolina. The Rev. John H. Munro, M.Th., D.Min., has served as senior pastor since 2006.

== History ==
The church was founded in 1939 as Bible Presbyterian Church at Central High School. The first pastor was the Rev. Edgar Archer Dillard, and one of the founding elders was Billy Graham's father Frank, whose participation was in part a response to Billy's conversion. The first building was completed in 1941 on Fourth Street and held 750. Under the Rev. Ross Rhoads, who began his more than 20 years of service in 1973, Calvary increased membership from 400 to 2000 in three years, with the first building at a new location at Sardis and Randolph Roads. A 1500-seat sanctuary was dedicated in 1978. Groundbreaking for the current building took place in 1986. The previous Calvary location was sold first to Carmel Baptist Church for $6 million in 1985, but due to delays by Calvary in moving out, Carmel sold its contract to Central Church of God in March 1988.

In December 1989, the current (fifth) building opened in Charlotte. The designer was Roe Messner, who began construction. The church board fired Messner when he became embroiled in the PTL scandal, and J.N. Pease Associates Architects modified and completed the design. Metric Constructors, a Charlotte general contractor, took the structure from less than 10% to completion. The main sanctuary seats more than 5,000. The 11,499-pipe organ is one of the twenty largest pipe organs in the world, and one of the top ten built all at once.

In 2011, a Life Center opened for children's ministries, student ministry, and CHAMP Sports Outreach.

As of 2026, the attendance was 3,000 people.
