= Theodore Epp =

American pastor and radio broadcaster (1907–1985)

Theodore H. Epp
- Born: January 27, 1907; Oraibi, Arizona, U.S.
- Died: October 13, 1985 (aged 78); Lincoln, Nebraska, U.S.
- Spouse: Matilda Schmidt
- Children: 6
- Church: Mennonite
- Congregations served: Back to the Bible weekly radio program (1939–1985)

Theodore H. Epp (January 27, 1907 – October 13, 1985) was an American Protestant Christian clergyman, writer, and radio evangelist. Epp was the founding director of the Back to the Bible radio broadcast and speaker on the program from 1939 to 1985. As of 1999 the program was heard worldwide on over 800 stations in eight languages.

== Early years and education ==
Epp was born in Oraibi, Arizona, the son of Russian Mennonite immigrants. His parents were missionaries to the Hopi Indians there. After graduating from Oklahoma Bible Academy, Epp attended Hesston College, Hesston, Kansas, and the Bible Institute of Los Angeles (now Biola University). Epp received a ThM degree in 1932 from Southwestern Baptist Theological Seminary in Fort Worth, Texas.

== Ministry ==
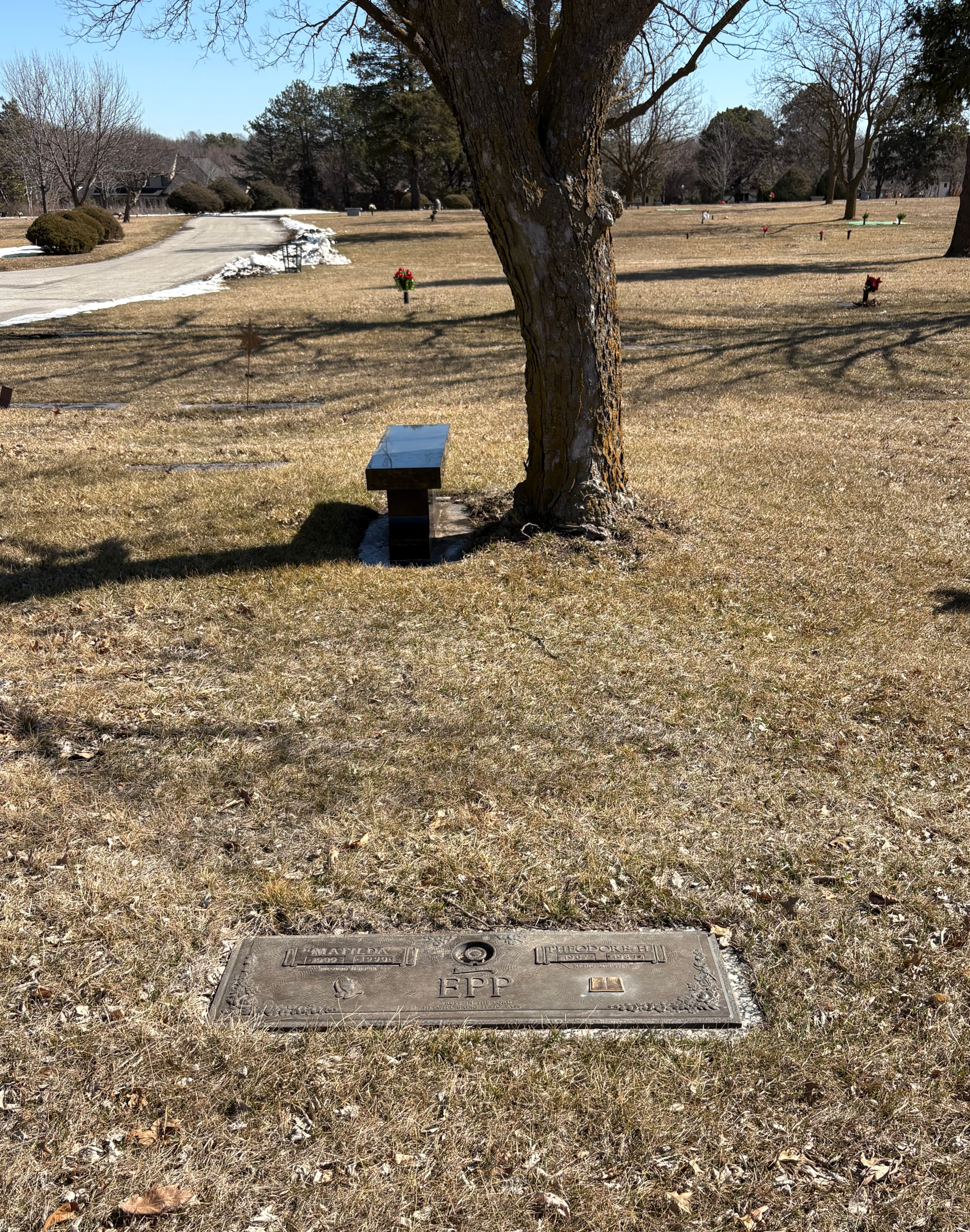
Epp's grave at Lincoln Memorial Park

Epp started his ministry as a pastor and radio preacher in Goltry, Oklahoma, and then relocated to Lincoln, Nebraska, where he established the Back to the Bible radio program. It was first broadcast May 1, 1939, on a local station and was eventually syndicated as a daily 30-minute program to more than 800 radio stations worldwide by the time of his retirement in 1985.

Under Epp's direction, the broadcasts were also noted for music by the Back to the Bible Choir and the Back to the Bible Quartet. Several popular recordings were made by the choir in the 1940s and 1950s. Back to the Bible also had a weekly youth program, featuring a youth choir and serialized adventures with a Christian theme. Both the music and the youth programs have since been discontinued. Epp wrote nearly 70 books and magazine articles.

== Personal life and death ==
Epp married Matilda Schmidt in 1930, and together they had six children. He died on October 13, 1985, in Lincoln, Nebraska, and is buried at Lincoln Memorial Park there. The Back to the Bible program he founded was led after his death by Warren W. Wiersbe, later followed by various successors. The program remains headquartered in Lincoln, Nebraska.
