= History of Bob Jones University =

Evangelist Bob Jones Sr. founded Bob Jones University out of concern with the secularization of higher education. BJU has had seven presidents: Bob Jones Sr. (1927–1947); Bob Jones Jr. (1947–1971); Bob Jones III (1971–2005); Stephen Jones (2005—2014); Steve Pettit, (2014–2023); Joshua Crockett, (2024–2025); and Bruce McAllister, (2025–present). Its religious influence, its past race relations, and its political influence have generated significant controversies.

== Religious influence ==
=== Billy Graham ===
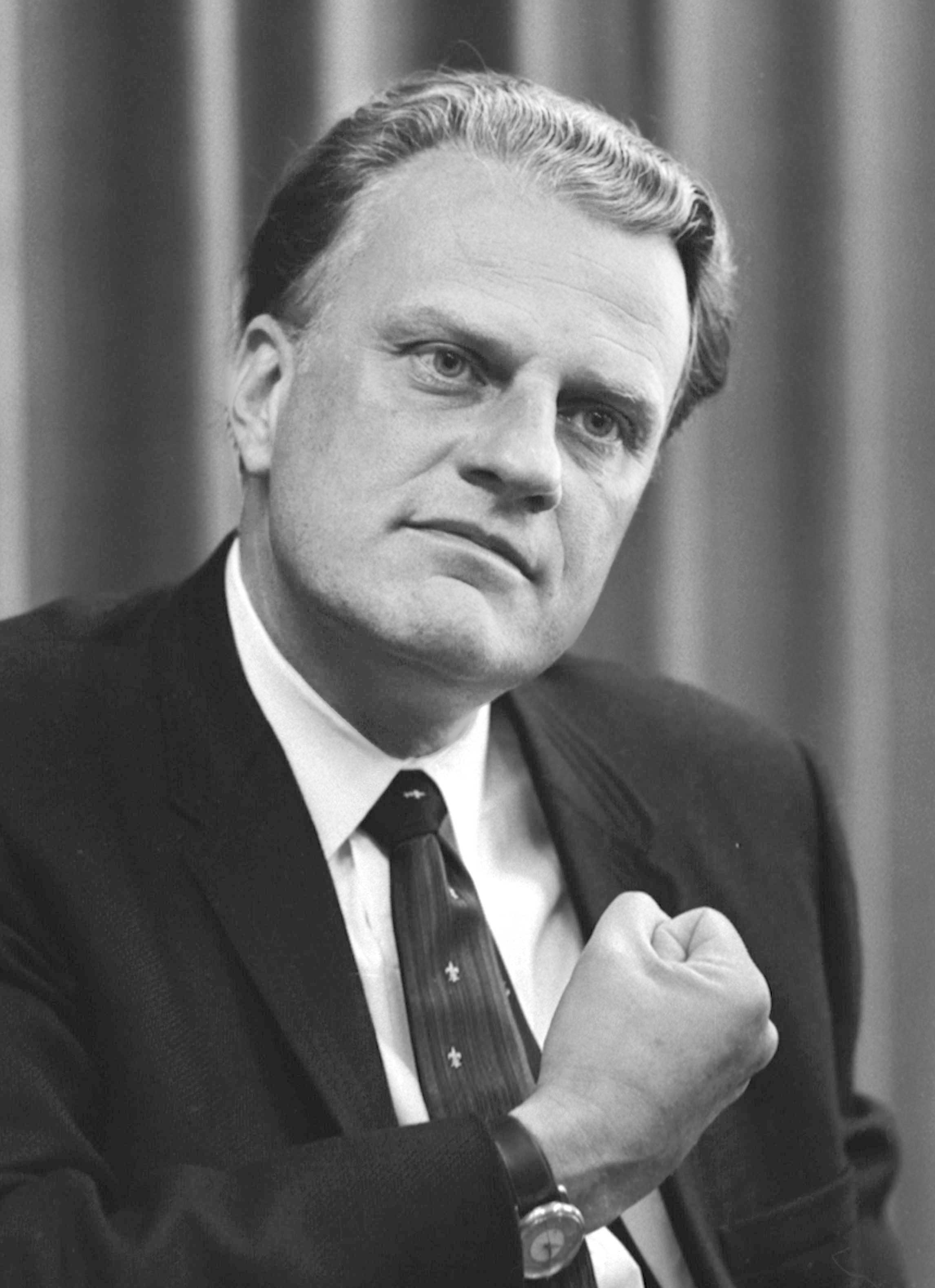
Billy Graham, who attended BJU for one semester, was later at odds with the University

One of the earliest controversies to center on BJU was the break that occurred in the late 1950s between separatist fundamentalists and neo-evangelicals represented by the newly prominent evangelist Billy Graham. Graham had briefly attended Bob Jones College, and the university conferred an honorary degree on him in 1948. During the 1950s, however, Graham began distancing himself from the older fundamentalism and, in preparation for his 1957 New York Crusade, he sought broad ecumenical sponsorship.

Bob Jones Sr. argued that if members of Graham's campaign executive committee had rejected major tenets of orthodox Christianity, such as the virgin birth and the deity of Christ, then Graham had violated 2 John 9-11, which prohibits receiving in fellowship those who do "not abide in the teaching of Christ." In the 1960s, Graham further irritated fundamentalists by gaining the endorsement of Cardinal Richard Cushing for his Boston campaign and accepting honorary degrees from two Roman Catholic colleges.

As was his policy, Graham ignored criticism of his campaigns and, in 1966, claimed not to know why the university opposed them; but members of his staff openly accused Jones of jealousy on the grounds that Jones's evangelistic meetings had never been as large as Graham's. Graham's father-in-law, L. Nelson Bell, mailed a fiery ten-page letter to most members of the BJU faculty and student body (as well as to thousands of pastors across the country) accusing Jones of "hatred, distortions, jealousies, envying, malice, false witnessing, and untruthfulness."

In what seemed to the Joneses to be a deliberate affront, Graham held his only American campaign of 1966 in Greenville, South Carolina. Under penalty of expulsion, the university forbade any BJU dormitory student from attending the Graham meetings. In a four-page position paper delivered to students in 1965, Bob Jones Jr., condemned Billy Graham's "ecumenical evangelism" as unscriptural and "heretical," noting that Graham shared his platform with Catholic priests and that one could not "be a good Catholic and a good, spiritual Christian." When Graham arrived in Greenville, Jones Jr. emphasized that the basis of the university's position was scriptural and not personal. "The Bible commands that false teachers and men who deny the fundamentals of the faith should be accursed; that is, they shall be criticized and condemned. Billy approves them, Billy condones them, Billy recommends them....I think that Dr. Graham is doing more harm in the cause of Jesus Christ than any living man; that he is leading foolish and untaught Christians, simple people that do not know the Word of God, into disobedience to the Word of God."

The negative publicity caused by the rift with Graham, itself a reflection of a larger division between separatist fundamentalists and neo-evangelicals, precipitated a decline in BJU enrollment of about 10% in the years 1956–59. Seven members of the university board (of about a hundred) also resigned in support of Graham, including Graham himself and two of his staff members. By 1966, when Graham appeared in Greenville, BJU enrollment had strongly rebounded and continued to grow thereafter until the mid-1980s.

=== King James Version of the Bible ===
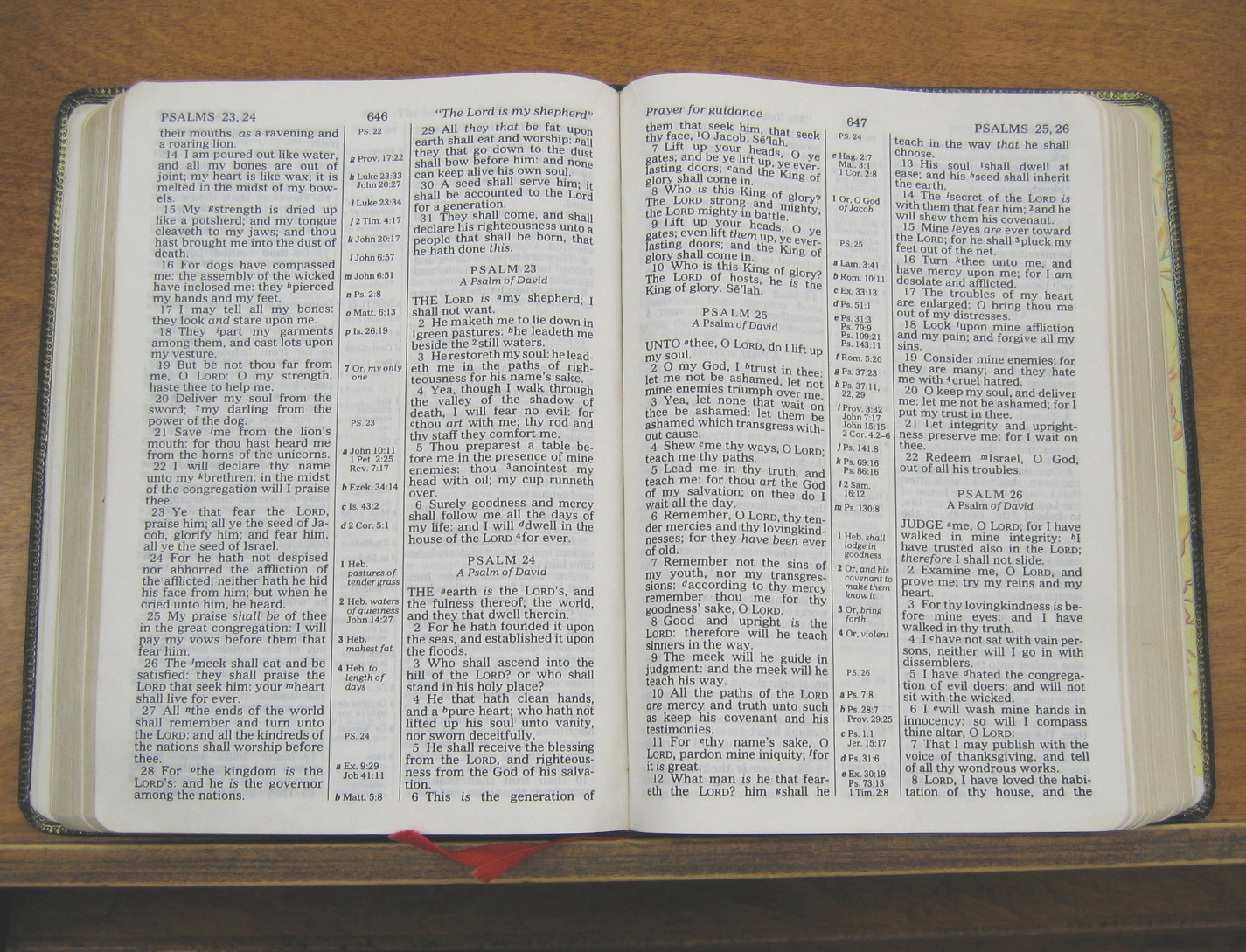
King James Version of the Bible

The university requires use of the King James Version (KJV) of the Bible in its services and classrooms, but it does not hold that the KJV is the only acceptable English translation or that it has the same authority as the original Hebrew and Greek manuscripts. The King-James-Only Movement—or more correctly, movements, since it has many variations—became a divisive force in fundamentalism only as conservative modern Bible translations, such as the New American Standard Bible (NASB) and the New International Version (NIV) began to appear in the 1970s. BJU has taken the position that orthodox Christians of the late 19th and early 20th centuries (including fundamentalists) agreed that while the KJV was a substantially accurate translation, only the original manuscripts of the Bible written in Hebrew and Greek were infallible and inerrant. Bob Jones Jr. called the KJV-only position a "heresy" and "in a very definite sense, a blasphemy."

The university's stand has been condemned by some other fundamentalists. In 1998, Pensacola Christian College produced a widely distributed videotape, arguing that this "leaven of fundamentalism" was passed from the 19th-century Princeton theologian Benjamin B. Warfield (1851–1921) to Charles Brokenshire (1885–1954), who served BJU as dean of the School of Religion, and then to current BJU faculty members and graduates. Ironically, Peter Ruckman, a BJU graduate, has argued the most extreme version of the KJV-only position, that all translations of the Bible since the KJV have been of satanic origin.

=== Criticism of Catholicism and Mormonism ===
The three Bob Joneses, especially Bob Jones Jr., sharply criticized the Roman Catholic Church. For instance, Jones Jr. once said that Catholicism was "not another Christian denomination. It is a satanic counterfeit, an ecclesiastic tyranny over the souls of men....It is the old harlot of the book of the Revelation—'the Mother of Harlots.'" All popes, Jones asserted, "are demon possessed." In 2000, then-president Bob Jones III referred, on the university's web page, to Mormons and Catholics as "cults which call themselves Christian." Furthermore, in 1966, BJU awarded an honorary doctorate to the Rev. Ian Paisley, future British MP, leader of the Democratic Unionist Party, and Moderator of the Free Presbyterian Church of Ulster, who has referred to the Pope as a "Roman anti-Christ." Bob Jones III has argued that the university is not so much anti-Catholic or anti-Mormon as it is opposed to the idea that all men, regardless of religious beliefs, will eventually get to heaven: "Our shame would be in telling people a lie, and thereby letting them go to hell without Christ because we loved their goodwill more than we loved them and their souls…. All religion, including Catholicism, which teaches that salvation is by religious works or church dogma is false. Religion that makes the words of its leader, be he Pope or other, equal with the Word of God is false. Sola Scriptura. From the time of the Protestant Reformation onward, it has been understood that there is no commonality between the Bible way, which is justification by faith in the shed blood of Jesus Christ, and salvation by works, which the faithful, practicing Catholic embraces."

=== Sexual abuse study ===
In 2012, following allegations of sexual abuse and the mishandling of sexual abuse reports, the university hired a third-party, Godly Response to Abuse in the Christian Environment (GRACE), to conduct an impartial investigation. In January 2014, the university abruptly terminated its contract with GRACE a month before the results of the study were supposed to be published, then a month later rehired the group. Largely for internal reasons GRACE did not publish its 300-page final report until December, when it recommended the University take "personnel action" against former BJU president and Chancellor Bob Jones III, outsource future abuse counseling to secular organizations, offer free tuition to those who had left the university because of their treatment, and install a campus memorial to sexual abuse victims.

=== Board of trustees conflict ===
In late 2022, during a period of tension between University President Steve Pettit and members of the university's board of trustees, a group called "Positive BJU Grads and Friends" organized to support Pettit. Although Pettit signed a three-year contract on January 19, 2023, he resigned as president in March 2023, effective May 5, citing an inability to work with board chairman, John Lewis. Lewis resigned a week later. In 2023, Vice President Alan Benson was appointed interim president, and in 2024, the Board of Trustees named Baptist pastor and alumnus Joshua Crockett president. In 2025, Crockett returned to his previous church, and the Board named Vice President for Ministry, Bruce McAllister, as the seventh president.

== Race relations ==
=== Segregation ===
Although BJU admitted Asians and other ethnic groups from its inception, it did not enroll black students until 1971, eight years after the University of South Carolina and Clemson University had been integrated by court order. From 1971 to 1975, BJU admitted only married blacks, although the Internal Revenue Service (IRS) had already determined in 1970 that "private schools with racially discriminatory admissions policies" were not entitled to federal tax exemption. Late in 1971, BJU filed suit to prevent the IRS from taking its tax exemption, but in 1974, in Bob Jones University v. Simon, the U.S. Supreme Court ruled that the university did not have standing to sue until the IRS actually assessed taxes. Over a year later, on May 29, 1975, the University Board of Trustees authorized a change in policy to admit "students of any race," a move that occurred shortly before the announcement of the Supreme Court decision in Runyon v. McCrary (427 U.S. 160 [1976]), which prohibited racial exclusion in private schools.

In May 1975, as it prepared to allow unmarried blacks to enroll, BJU adopted more detailed rules prohibiting interracial dating and marriage—threatening expulsion for any student who dated or married interracially, who advocated interracial marriage, who was "affiliated with any group or organization which holds as one of its goals or advocates interracial marriage," or "who espouse, promote, or encourage others to violate the university's dating rules and regulations." In 1982 BJU's then-president Bob Jones III, during interviews in which he defended the school's tax-exempt status, cited nine passages from the Bible - drawn both from the Old and New Testaments - which he claimed demonstrated that God intended races to be segregated: "The Bible clearly teaches, starting in the 10th chapter of Genesis and going all the way through, that God has put differences among people on the earth to keep the earth divided", he said, adding that inter-racial marriage was "playing into the hands of the antichrist and the one-world system."

In 2000, following a media uproar prompted by the visit of presidential candidate George W. Bush to the university, Bob Jones III abruptly dropped the interracial dating rule, announcing the change on CNN's Larry King Live. Jones III said that interracial dating had been prohibited since the 1950s, having originated in a complaint by parents of a male Asian student who thought that their son had "nearly married" a white girl. Jones also admitted, "We can't point to a verse in the Bible that says you shouldn't date or marry inter-racial." Five years later when asked for his view of the rule change, the then president, Stephen Jones, replied, "I've never been more proud of my dad than the night he...lifted that policy."

=== Bob Jones University v. United States (1983) ===
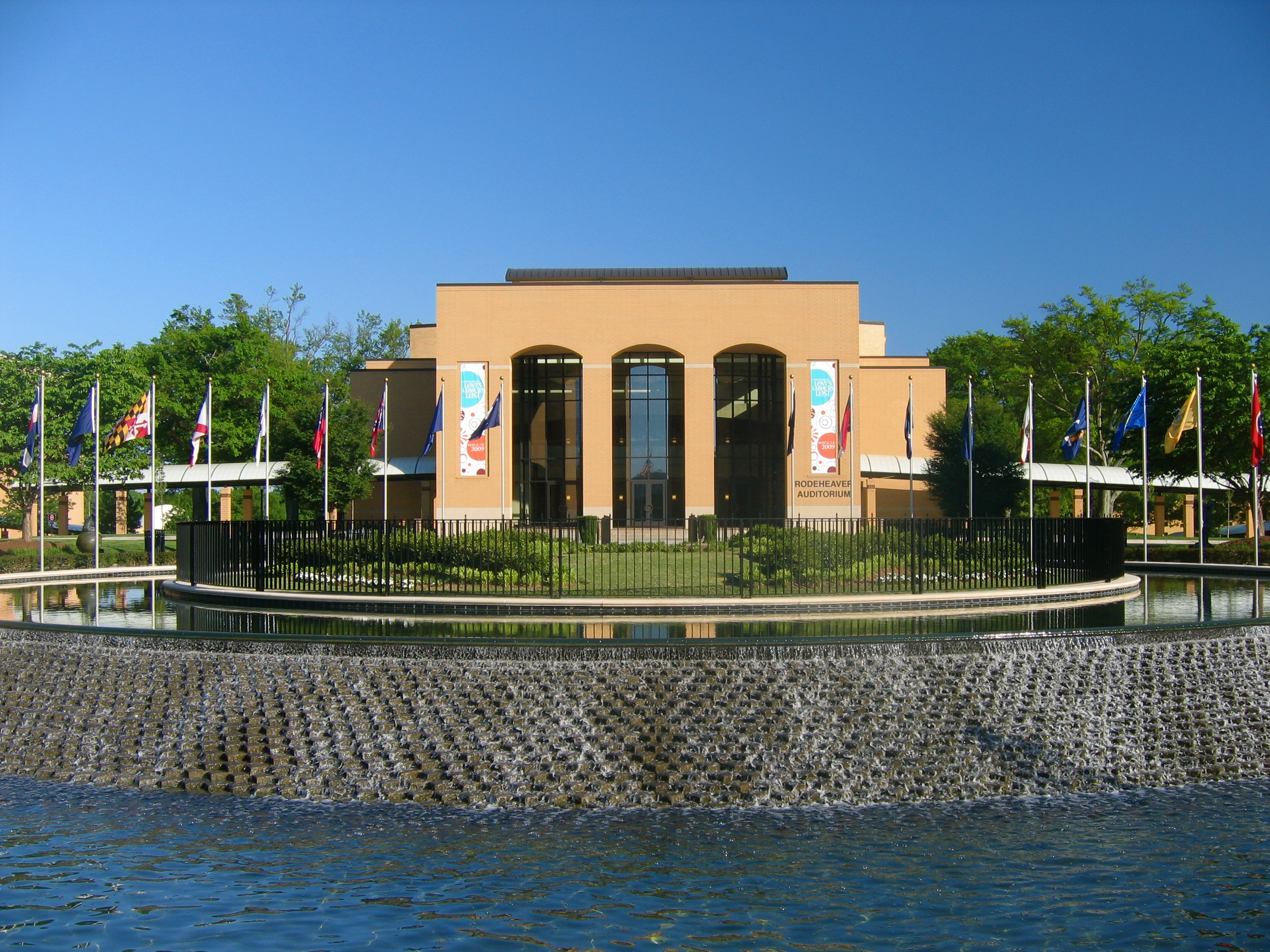
Rodeheaver Auditorium

On January 19, 1976, the Internal Revenue Service notified the university that its tax exemption had been revoked retroactively to December 1, 1970. The school appealed the IRS decision all the way to the U.S. Supreme Court, arguing that the university met all other criteria for tax-exempt status and that the school's racial discrimination was based on sincerely held religious beliefs, that "God intended segregation of the races and that the Scriptures forbid interracial marriage." The university was not challenged about the origin of its interracial dating policy, and the District Court accepted "on the basis of a full evidentiary record" BJU's argument that the rule was a sincerely held religious conviction, a finding affirmed by all subsequent courts. In December 1978, the federal district court ruled in the university's favor; two years later, that decision was overturned by the Fourth Circuit Court of Appeals.

On January 8, 1982, just before the case was to be heard by the U.S. Supreme Court, President Ronald Reagan authorized his Treasury and Justice Departments to ask that the BJU case be dropped and that the previous court decisions be vacated. Political pressure quickly brought the Reagan administration to reverse itself and to ask the court to reinstate the case. Then, in a virtually unprecedented move, the Court invited William T. Coleman Jr. to argue the government's position in an amicus curiae brief, thus ensuring that the prosecution's position would be the one the court wished to hear. The case was heard on October 12, 1982, and on May 24, 1983, the U.S. Supreme Court ruled against Bob Jones University in Bob Jones University v. United States (461 U.S. 574). The university refused to reverse its interracial dating policy and (with difficulty) paid a million dollars in back taxes. Also, in the year following the court decision, contributions to the university declined by 13 percent.

=== Apology for "racially hurtful" policies (2008) ===
In November 2008, the university declared itself "profoundly sorry" for having allowed "institutional policies to remain in place that were racially hurtful." That year BJU enrolled students from fifty states and nearly fifty countries, representing diverse ethnicities and cultures, and the BJU administration declared itself "committed to maintaining on the campus the racial and cultural diversity and harmony characteristic of the true Church of Jesus Christ throughout the world."

By 2005, the university had established two 501(c)(3) charitable organizations to provide scholarship assistance solely for minority students. Although BJU never reapplied for federal tax-exempt status, and it continues to pay federal taxes, a number of its ancillaries, including Bob Jones Academy and the BJU Museum & Gallery, are tax-exempt entities.

== Political involvement ==
As a twelve-year-old, Bob Jones Sr. made a twenty-minute speech in defense of the Populist Party. Jones was a friend and admirer of William Jennings Bryan but also campaigned throughout the South for Herbert Hoover (and against Al Smith) during the 1928 presidential election. Even the authorized history of BJU notes that both Bob Jones Sr. and Bob Jones Jr. "played political hardball" when dealing with the three municipalities in which the school was successively located. For instance, in 1962, Bob Jones Sr. warned the Greenville City Council that he had "four hundred votes in his pocket and in any election he would have control over who would be elected."

=== Republican powerhouse ===
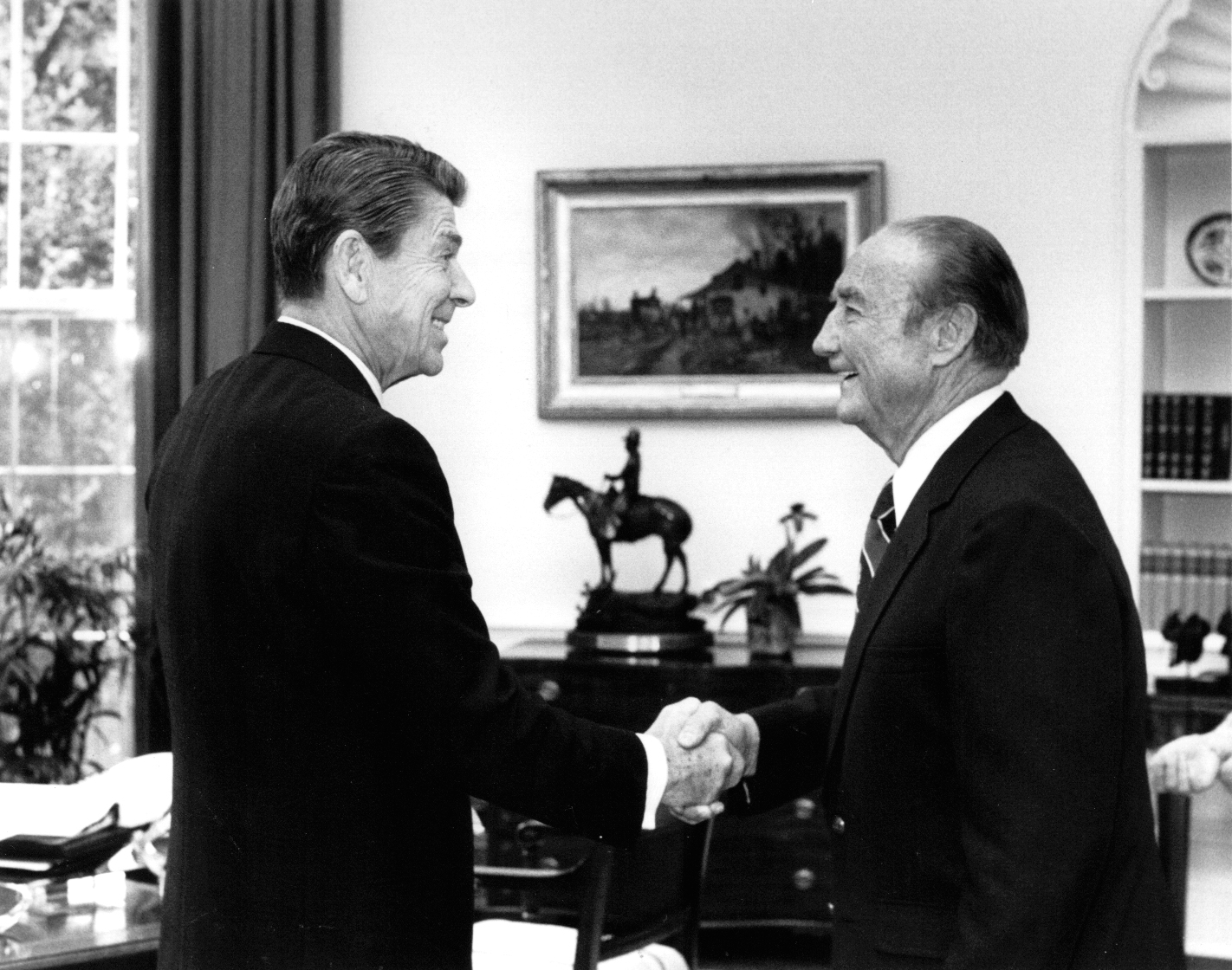
Both Ronald Reagan (left) and Strom Thurmond (right) played influential roles in the political life of BJU

From the inception of Bob Jones College, a majority of students and faculty were northerners, and therefore many were already Republicans living in the "Solid South." After South Carolina Senator Strom Thurmond switched his allegiance to the Republican Party in 1964, BJU faculty members became increasingly influential in the new state Republican party, and BJU alumni were elected to local political and party offices. In 1976, candidates supported by BJU faculty and alumni captured the local Republican party with unfortunate short-term political consequences, but by 1980 the religious right and the "country club" Republicans had joined forces. From then on, most Republican candidates for local and statewide offices sought the endorsement of Bob Jones III and greeted faculty/staff voters at the University Dining Common.

National Republicans soon followed. Ronald Reagan spoke at the school in 1980, although the Joneses supported his opponent, John Connally, in the South Carolina primary. (Later, Bob Jones III denounced Reagan as "a traitor to God's people" for choosing George H. W. Bush—whom Jones called a "devil"—as his vice president. Even later, Jones III shook Bush's hand and thanked him for being a good president.) In the 1990s, other Republicans such as Dan Quayle, Pat Buchanan, Phil Gramm, Bob Dole, and Alan Keyes also spoke at BJU. Democrats were rarely invited to speak at the university, in part because they took political and social positions (especially support for abortion rights) opposed by the Religious Right.

=== 2000 election ===
On February 2, 2000, George W. Bush, as candidate for president, spoke during school's chapel hour. Bush gave a standard stump speech making no specific reference to the university. His political opponents quickly noted his non-mention of the university's ban on interracial dating. During the Michigan primary, Bush was also criticized for not stating his opposition to the university's anti-Catholicism. (The John McCain campaign targeted Catholics with a "Catholic Voter Alert," phone calls reminding voters of Bush's visit to BJU.) Bush denied that he either knew of or approved what he regarded as BJU's intolerant policies. On February 26, Bush issued a formal letter of apology to Cardinal John Joseph O'Connor of New York City for failing to denounce Bob Jones University's history of anti-Catholic statements. At a news conference following the letter's release, Bush said, "I make no excuses. I had an opportunity and I missed it. I regret that....I wish I had gotten up then and seized the moment to set a tone, a tone that I had set in Texas, a positive and inclusive tone." Also during the 2000 Republican primary campaign in South Carolina, Richard Hand, a BJU professor, spread a false e-mail rumor that John McCain had fathered an illegitimate child. (The McCains have an adopted daughter from Bangladesh, and later push polling also implied that the child was biracial.)

=== Withdrawal from politics ===
Although the March 2007 issue of Foreign Policy listed BJU as one of "The World's Most Controversial Religious Sites" because of its past influence on American politics, BJU has seen little political controversy since Stephen Jones became president. When asked by a Newsweek reporter if he wished to play a political role, Stephen Jones replied, "It would not be my choice." Further, when asked if he felt ideologically closer to his father's engagement with politics or to other evangelicals who have tried to avoid civic involvement, he answered, "The gospel is for individuals. The main message we have is to individuals. We're not here to save the culture." In a 2005 Washington Post interview, Jones dodged political questions and even admitted that he was embarrassed by "some of the more vitriolic comments" made by his predecessors. "I don't want to get specific," he said, "But there were things said back then that I wouldn't say today." In October 2007 when Bob Jones III, as "a private citizen," endorsed Mitt Romney for the Republican nomination for president, Stephen Jones made it clear that he wished "to stay out of politics" and that neither he nor the university had endorsed anyone. Despite a hotly contested South Carolina primary, none of the candidates appeared on the platform of BJU's Founders' Memorial Amphitorium during the 2008 election cycle.

In April 2008 Stephen Jones told a reporter, "I don't think I have a political bone in my body."

=== Renewed political engagement ===
In 2015, with the school's earlier racial positions (in the words of a Greenville News reporter) "ancient history," BJU reemerged as campaign stop of significance for conservative Republicans. Republicans Ben Carson (an African-American) and Ted Cruz (a Hispanic-American) held large on-campus rallies on two successive days in November, and BJU president Steve Pettit met with Marco Rubio, Rick Perry, Mike Huckabee, and Scott Walker. Chip Felkel, a Greenville Republican consultant, noted that some of the candidates closely identified "with the folks at Bob Jones. So it makes sense for them to want to be there." Nevertheless, unlike BJU's earlier periods of involvement in politics, Pettit said he would not endorse anyone.
