= President Jones =

President Jones may refer to:

- Anson Jones, president of the Republic of Texas
- Bob Jones Sr. (1883–1968), president of Bob Jones University
- Bob Jones Jr. (1911–1997), president of Bob Jones University
- Rock F. Jones, president of Ohio Wesleyan University
- Stephen Jones (administrator) (born 1969), president of Bob Jones University

== See also ==
- Rufus Jones for President, 1933 American Pre-Code satirical musical-comedy
