= Doctor Bob (disambiguation) =

Doctor Bob (Bob Smith; 1879–1950) was the co-founder of Alcoholics Anonymous

Doctor Bob may also refer to a number of factual or fictional individuals:

- Bob Jones Sr., American fundamentalist evangelist and founder of Bob Jones University
  - Bob Jones Jr. (1911–1997), president and chancellor of Bob Jones University, and son of Bob Jones, Sr.
  - Bob Jones III (born 1939), president of Bob Jones University, and grandson of Bob Jones, Sr.
- Bob McCarron (born 1950), Australian medic and special effects prosthetic makeup artist
- Robert Sears (physician), American physician noted for his unorthodox and dangerous views on childhood vaccination
- Robert Watts (artist) (1923–1988), American artist
- A character in the "Veterinarian's Hospital" sketch on The Muppet Show played by Rowlf the Dog

== See also ==
- Doctor Robert, a 1966 song by the Beatles
- Bill W. and Dr. Bob, a 2013 play by Stephen Bergman and Janet Surrey
