= SoundForth =

SoundForth was a division of the Bob Jones University Press until October 1, 2012, when it was sold to Lorenz Publishing. SoundForth produces and markets religious music recordings through a music download website, SacredAudio as well as a mailing catalog. SoundForth also publishes sacred music for choirs, keyboard, vocal ensembles, and instrumental solos and ensembles, including handbells.

== SoundForth Recordings ==
Choral - yearly

- 2000 - Faithful I Will Be
- 2001 - Refuge
- 2002 - When Jesus Comes
- 2003 - Think on These Things
- 2004 - More Like You, Lord
- 2005 - A Strong Tower
- 2006 - A Quiet Heart
- 2007 - Depths of Mercy
- 2008 - King of Love
- 2009 - God of Mercy
- 2010 - Promises
- 2011 - Beyond All Praising

Men's Ensemble

- 2012 - Project 10 Men: Steadfast Faith

Mixture of Choral and Instrumental Pieces

- A Song I Love To Sing
- Bright Canaan
- Freedom Through Christ

Others

- A Christmas Celebration
- Crown Him

Kevin Inafuku

- Use Me, Lord

== Notable musicians marketed by SoundForth ==
- Emily Hickey - Irish Blessing
- Ben Everson
- Christy Galkin
- Frank Garlock
- Greg Howlett
- Herbster Evangelistic Ministries
- Kevin Inafuku
- Rebecca Bonam
- Ron Hamilton
- Mac Lynch
- Duane Ream
- Dwight Gustafson
- Joan Pinkston
- Dan Forrest
