= Palmetto Family Council =

Conservative American lobbying organization

- Established: 1993
- Founder: G. Steven Suits
- Tax ID no.: 57-0968725 (EIN)
- Legal status: 501(c)(3) organization
- Headquarters: 1414 Lady St. #3304, Columbia
- Key people: Steve Pettit, President.
- Revenue: $219,957 (2017)
- Website: www.palmettofamily.org

Palmetto Family Council is a nonprofit public policy organization focused upon implementing conservative Christian ideas in South Carolina state law, especially concerning sexual morality. It opposes same-sex marriage, sex education, and vaccination against sexually transmitted infection. It supports restrictions on abortion and pornography. It works to place symbols of Christianity into schools and civic institutions. Similar national groups include the Family Research Council, a domestic hate group.

Palmetto Family Council has stated its goal is to "transform the culture in South Carolina by promoting the values and virtues of marriage, the traditional family model, and sexual purity." South Carolina politician Todd Rutherford described Palmetto Family Council as "a group whose mission is to fight against equal rights and equal treatment of others."

Palmetto Family Council is a Family Policy Council, meaning that it is a Focus on the Family state-level affiliate organization. Its headquarters are in Columbia near the South Carolina State House.

== Prohibiting same-sex marriage ==
Palmetto Family Council president Oran Smith authored South Carolina Amendment 1, a 2006 state constitutional ban of same-sex marriage. The organization argued gay marriage should be illegal because of "evidence of dysfunction" in European countries where it was legalized. Henry McMaster led Palmetto Family Council's campaign to persuade voters to prohibit gay marriage while he was Attorney General of South Carolina.

== Mandating ultrasounds ==
The South Carolina House of Representatives passed a bill requiring women seeking an abortion to view an ultrasound image in 2007. Palmetto Family Council canvassing was crucial in passing the bill, and in opposing any exception for victims of rape or incest.

Supporters of the bill hoped an emotional experience upon seeing ultrasound pictures would cause women to change their minds about abortion. Other states require ultrasound images be made available, but the South Carolina House bill was alone in mandating that women must look at the pictures.

== Dabo Swinney and hate group allegations ==
Clemson University coach Dabo Swinney was criticized by gay rights groups for planning to receive an award from Palmetto Family Council in 2015. After which he declined to receive the award and the Palmetto Family Council defended itself from allegations it is a hate group for supporting bigotry and homophobia. Even the council chairman Reese Boyd III stated that during the Swinney controversy critics characterized PFC as a hate group.

== Scandal ==
Former Palmetto Family Council President, Dave Wilson Jr., resigned quietly on March 9, 2023 after being exposed for an extramarital relationship. He was replaced by interim president Mitch Prosser, and then by Steve Pettit as a new president in 2024.

== See also ==
- Family Research Council
- List of U.S. Hate Groups
