= Steve Pettit =

American Christian evangelist (born 1955)

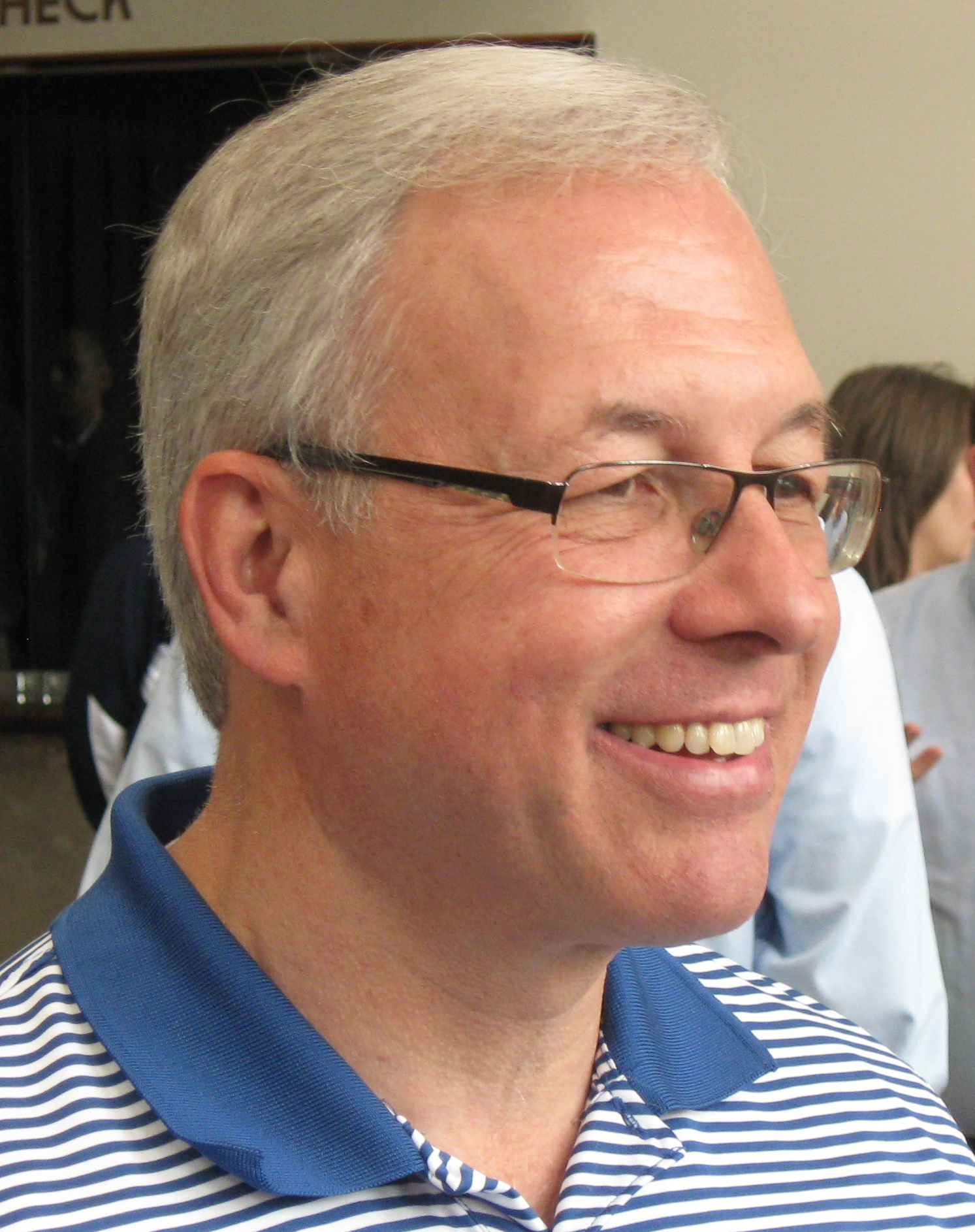
- Steve Pettit on May 10, 2014

5th President of Bob Jones University
- In office 2014–2023
- Preceded by: Stephen Jones
- Succeeded by: Joshua Crockett

Personal details
- Born: November 27, 1955 (age 70) Quitman, Georgia
- Spouse: Terry Elkins Pettit
- Children: Rebecca Pettit, Rachel Pettit Bercot, Stephen Pettit, Michael Pettit
- Parent(s): Elinor Jones Pettit, William (Bill) Pettit
- Education: The Citadel (BS); Bob Jones University (MA)

Stephen Davis Pettit, Sr. (born November 27, 1955) is an American Christian evangelist who served as the fifth president of Bob Jones University from 2014 to 2023.

== Early life and education ==
Steve Pettit was born in Quitman, Georgia, but his parents, who had met in the United States Air Force, moved to Columbia, South Carolina, when he was three. Pettit spent his childhood in Columbia, performing in a workshop theater founded by his mother and playing the tuba in his high school band. He was the captain of the soccer team and was elected class president at his high school three years in a row.

Pettit attended The Citadel, where he received a Bachelor of Science degree in Business Administration in 1978. A teammate on The Citadel's soccer team, a devout Christian, witnessed to Pettit; and on Easter Sunday 1975, in response to a radio sermon, Pettit "called on the Lord, and He saved me by His grace.”

Believing he was called to preach, Pettit enrolled in Bob Jones University Seminary and Graduate School of Religion, where he graduated with a Master of Arts in pastoral studies in 1980.

== Career ==
He served as an assistant pastor at the First Baptist Church, Bridgeport, Michigan, from 1980 until 1985 and then formed his own Steve Pettit Evangelistic Association with headquarters in Pembine, Wisconsin. He and his evangelistic teams of young people in their 20s conducted more than 800 evangelistic campaigns throughout the United States and in more than 21 countries. Pettit also served as staff evangelist (1985–2002) and camp director (2002–2011) at Northland Camp and Conference Center in Dunbar, Wisconsin. In 2011, he became national director of Cross Impact Ministries. Pettit has been featured in a number of recordings playing the mandolin, and he has written several devotional books.

The BJU Board of Trustees named Pettit president on May 8, 2014, after the resignation of Stephen Jones, great-grandson of the founder, Bob Jones, Sr. Pettit thus became the first president of the university not related to the Jones family.

During Pettit's first seven years as BJU president, the university gained regional accreditation from the Southern Association of Colleges and Schools Commission on Colleges, the university regained its tax exempt status, it launched a new School of Health Professions, and it added eight new intercollegiate sports and gained provisional membership in NCAA Division III. During the COVID-19 pandemic, Pettit opted to open the university for in-person classes in the fall of 2020 and organized several task forces to make the necessary adjustments work successfully.

On March 30, 2023, Pettit announced his resignation effective May 5, citing his inability to work with John Lewis, the chairman of the board of trustees.

Pettit then reentered evangelism and traveled with a gospel bluegrass band. In April 2024, the Palmetto Family Council named Pettit as its president.

Academic offices
Preceded by Stephen Jones	President of Bob Jones University; 2014–2023	Succeeded by Joshua Crockett
