= Dwight Gustafson =

American classical composer

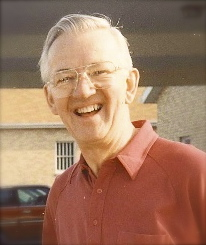
- Dwight Gustafson, October 1993
- Born: Dwight Leonard Gustafson; April 20, 1930; Seattle, Washington, US
- Died: January 28, 2014 (aged 83); Greenville, South Carolina, US
- Resting place: Graceland Cemetery, Greenville, South Carolina
- Education: Bob Jones University, Florida State University
- Occupation: musician
- Employer: Bob Jones University
- Title: Dean of the School of Fine Arts
- Term: 1954–1997
- Predecessor: Karl Keefer
- Successor: Darren Lawson
- Spouse: Gwendolyn Adams Gustafson
- Children: four, including David Gustafson

Dwight Leonard Gustafson (April 20, 1930 – January 28, 2014) was an American composer, conductor, and dean of the School of Fine Arts at Bob Jones University.

== Biography ==
Gustafson was born in Seattle, Washington to Leonard Gustafson, a meat dealer and lay preacher, and Rachel Gustafson, a pianist, harpist, and artist. His childhood home was on Lake Sammamish, and he graduated in 1948 from Queen Anne High School.

Despite early violin training, Gustafson was attracted to a career in art and design. As a sophomore at Bob Jones University, he was asked to make sketches for a production of Cyrano de Bergerac and ended by designing the sets. In 1954, shortly before graduating from BJU with an M.A. in music, he was flabbergasted to be asked by the then-president, Bob Jones Jr., to become dean of the School of Fine Arts. Gustafson was 24. Eventually he also earned a D. Mus. in composition from Florida State University, and in 1960, he was selected as one of ten young conductors to study at the Aspen School of Music.

Gustafson quickly proved himself a competent administrator who brought to his position a working knowledge of art, music, and drama. He also regularly conducted campus choirs and the Bob Jones Symphony Orchestra, especially in its annual opera productions. As a composer Gustafson was best known for his sacred choral compositions and arrangements, although his more than 160 works included five film scores, a string quartet, Encounters (a violin concerto), and numerous extended compositions for chorus and orchestra, including Three Psalms for Chorus and Orchestra (1989) and Words of Passion and Resurrection (2002). "Fantasia for a Celebration" was commissioned by the Williamsburg (VA) Symphonia as part of the city's 300-year celebration in 1999. In December 2006, Gustafson premiered a one-act opera, Simeon, about the blessing given by Simeon the Righteous to the Christ child (Luke 2: 25-35).

After Gustafson retired as dean following forty years of service, Bob Jones University named the Gustafson Fine Arts Center in his honor. In 1999, he was awarded the Order of the Palmetto by then-Governor Jim Hodges. Gustafson continued to conduct occasional programs at BJU until 2010, as well as remaining active as a conductor of high school all-state choirs and orchestras and conducting church choir clinics. In 2012 he published brief devotional memoirs as A Brighter Witness: Conversations on the Christian and the Arts. Gustafson died of complications from liver disease on January 28, 2014.

Gustafson's successor as dean of the School of Fine Arts, Darren Lawson, noted that because Gustafson was 6 ft 5 in (1.96 m), people looked up to him both "figuratively and literally... He acted, designed sets, sang, composed, conducted. He did it all. He really was a Renaissance man." And Lawson noted that while Gustafson advocated excellence and high standards in music, he also had a strong sense of humor.
