= Stephen Jones (administrator) =

American academic administrator (born 1969)

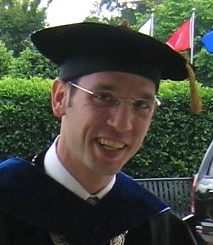
- Jones in 2008

4th President of Bob Jones University
- In office 2005–2014
- Preceded by: Bob Jones III
- Succeeded by: Steve Pettit

Personal details
- Born: December 31, 1969 (age 56) Greenville, South Carolina, US
- Spouse: Erin Rodman Jones
- Children: 3
- Education: Bob Jones University

Stephen Benjamin Jones (born December 31, 1969) is a former president of Bob Jones University. Born on the university campus, he graduated from Bob Jones Academy. In 1992 he received a bachelor's degree in public speaking from BJU and in 1996, a Master of Divinity. On the day he became University president in 2005, Jones also received a Ph.D. in Liberal Arts Studies from BJU. Jones's wife, Erin Rodman Jones, who is the Director of the BJU Museum & Gallery, is also a BJU graduate. They have three children.

Before becoming president, Jones served BJU as a teaching assistant, a residence hall supervisor, and the vice president for administration. Stephen Jones is the son of Bob Jones III, the grandson of Bob Jones Jr., and the great-grandson of Bob Jones Sr, the university's founder. Originally Stephen Jones hoped his older brother, Bob IV, would "take the administrative side of the presidency" allowing Stephen to concentrate on the "preaching, traveling, [and] people side" of the position; but his brother left the university to become a freelance writer. Like his father and grandfather before him, Jones took numerous roles in university plays and productions.

Jones underwent a brief period of rebellion against his heritage and his parents' religious standards during his freshman year of high school, such as having a few hidden rock recordings—prohibited on the BJU campus—which he confessed to his father. "I thought he'd fly off the handle, but he didn't," Jones said. "Dad was very straightforward, but very forgiving and very supportive." The worst part was having others on campus learn about the demerits he received for the incident. "I was always the good boy, and it hurt when it came out."

Stephen Jones serves on the boards of Gospel Fellowship Association (GFA), Jesus Saves Mission - USA, Fundamental Baptist Fellowship International, Evangelism Foundation, Inc., The Wilds Christian Camp and the Greenville Symphony Orchestra. Early in his administration BJU was granted full accreditation by the Transnational Association of Christian Colleges and Schools.

When, in 2005, he was asked by Newsweek if he wished to play a political role as had his predecessors at BJU, Jones replied, "It would not be my choice." Further, when asked if he felt ideologically closer to his father's engagement with politics or to other evangelicals who have tried to avoid civic involvement, he answered, "The gospel is for individuals. The main message we have is to individuals. We're not here to save the culture." In a 2005 Washington Post interview, Jones dodged political questions and even admitted that he was embarrassed by "some of the more vitriolic comments" made by his predecessors. "I don't want to get specific," he said, "But there were things said back then that I wouldn't say today." In October 2007 when Bob Jones III, as "a private citizen," endorsed Mitt Romney for the Republican nomination for president, Stephen Jones made it clear that he wished "to stay out of politics" and that neither he nor the University had endorsed anyone. In April 2008 he told a reporter, "I don't think I have a political bone in my body."

In the fall of 2010, Jones was "nearly incapacitated" after suffering a severely damaged nerve due to an ear infection; he took extended medical leave after experiencing persistent nausea, dizziness, and migraines. During this period, he was "never fully disconnected," though sometimes he could only work a few hours a week. After spending three weeks at the Cleveland Clinic Pain Management Center in the summer of 2012, Jones returned to work, telling a reporter that his time of illness "grew the university family. Everyone came together in a humbling way." Nevertheless, citing "persistence of my health issues," Jones resigned from the presidency of BJU on December 13, 2013, and was succeeded by Steve Pettit on May 10, 2014.

Academic offices
| Preceded by Bob Jones III | President of Bob Jones University; 2005–2014 | Succeeded by Steve Pettit |
