= Bob Jones University =

Evangelical university in Greenville, South Carolina, US

- Former names: Bob Jones College (1927–1947)
- Motto: Latin: Petimus Credimus
- Motto in English: We seek, we trust
- Type: Private university
- Established: 1927 (99 years ago)
- Accreditation: SACS, TRACS
- Religious affiliation: Evangelical Christian (formerly Christian fundamentalism)
- Endowment: $20.5 million (2024)
- Chancellor: Bob Jones III
- President: Bruce McAllister
- Provost: David Fisher
- Academic staff: 287
- Students: 2,893
- Undergraduates: 2,477
- Postgraduates: 416
- Location: Greenville, South Carolina, 29614-0001, United States; 34.873°N 82.364°W
- Campus: 210 acres (85 ha); Small city
- Colors: Light blue, navy, and white
- Nickname: The Bruins
- Sporting affiliations: NCCAA Division II – South
- Mascot: Brody the Bruin
- Website: bju.edu

Bob Jones University (BJU) is a private university in Greenville, South Carolina, United States. It is known for its conservative and evangelical cultural and religious positions. The university, with approximately 2,900 students, is accredited by the Southern Association of Colleges and Schools Commission on Colleges (SACSCOC) and the Transnational Association of Christian Colleges and Schools. In 2017, the university estimated the number of its graduates at 40,184.

== History ==
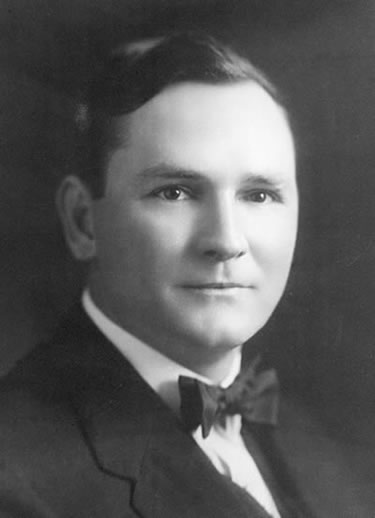
Bob Jones Sr., the university's founder

During the Fundamentalist-Modernist controversy of the 1920s, Christian evangelist Bob Jones Sr. grew increasingly concerned about what he perceived to be the secularization of higher education and the influence of religious liberalism in denominational colleges. Jones recalled that in 1924, his friend William Jennings Bryan leaned over to him at a Bible conference service in Winona Lake, Indiana, and said, "If schools and colleges do not quit teaching evolution as a fact, we are going to become a nation of atheists." Though Jones was not a college graduate, he was determined to found a college. On September 12, 1927, Jones opened Bob Jones College in Lynn Haven, Florida, with 88 students. Jones said that although he had been averse to naming the school after himself, his friends overcame his reluctance "with the argument that the school would be called by that name because of my connection with it, and to attempt to give it any other name would confuse the people".

Bob Jones took no salary from the college. He supported the school with personal savings and income from his evangelistic campaigns. The Florida land boom had peaked in 1925, and a hurricane in September 1926 further reduced land values. Bob Jones College barely survived bankruptcy and its move to Cleveland, Tennessee, in 1933. In the same year, the college also ended participation in intercollegiate sports. Bankrupt at the nadir of the Depression, without a home and with barely enough money to move its library and office furniture, the college became the largest liberal arts college in Tennessee thirteen years later. With the enactment of the GI Bill at the end of World War II, the need for campus expansion to accommodate increased enrollment led to a relocation to South Carolina.

Though Jones had served as acting president as early as 1934, his son, Bob Jones Jr. became the school's second president in 1947 before the college moved to Greenville, South Carolina, and became Bob Jones University. In Greenville, the university more than doubled in size within two years and started an AM radio station in 1949 (1260 WMUU with 94.5 WMUU-FM signing on in 1960), film department, and art gallery—the latter of which eventually became one of the largest collections of religious art in the Western Hemisphere.

During the late 1950s, BJU and alumnus Billy Graham, who had attended Bob Jones College for one semester in 1936 and received an honorary degree from the university in 1948, had a dispute over the propriety of theological conservatives cooperating with theological liberals to support evangelistic campaigns, a controversy that widened an already growing rift between separatist fundamentalists and other evangelicals. Negative publicity caused by the dispute precipitated a decline in BJU enrollment of about 10% in the years 1956–59, and seven members of the university board (of about a hundred) also resigned in support of Graham, including Graham himself and two of his staff members. When, in 1966, Graham held his only American campaign in Greenville, the university forbade BJU dormitory students to attend under penalty of expulsion. Enrollment quickly rebounded, and by 1970, there were 3,300 students, approximately 60% more than in 1958.

In 1971, Bob Jones III became president at age 32, though his father, with the title of Chancellor, continued to exercise considerable administrative authority into the late 1990s. At the 2005 commencement, Stephen Jones was installed as the fourth president, and Bob Jones III assumed the title of chancellor. Stephen Jones resigned in 2014 for health reasons, and evangelist Steve Pettit was named president, the first president unrelated to the Jones family.

In 2011, the university became a member of the Transnational Association of Christian Colleges and Schools (TRACS) and reinstated intercollegiate athletics. In March 2017, the university regained its federal tax exemption after a complicated restructuring divided the organization into for-profit and non-profit entities, and in June 2017, it was granted accreditation by the Southern Association of Colleges and Schools.

In March 2023, Pettit resigned, effective May 5, citing his inability to work with the chairman of the university's board of trustees. Shortly thereafter, the president of the board also resigned. Vice President Alan Benson was appointed interim president for the 2023–24 school year. In May 2024, Baptist pastor and BJU alumnus Joshua Crockett was elected the university's sixth president. After he returned to his former pastorate in 2025, the Board of Trustees named Bruce McAllister, Vice President for Ministry, as the seventh president.

== Academics ==
Academic rankings

Master's
- Washington Monthly: 431 of 589 (Outcome)

Regional
- U.S. News & World Report: 23 (tie) of 122

The university comprises seven colleges and schools offering more than 60 undergraduate majors, including fourteen associate degree programs. Many of the university employees consider their positions as much ministries as jobs. It is common for retiring professors to have served the university for more than forty years, a circumstance that has contributed to the stability and conservatism of an institution that has virtually no endowment and at which faculty salaries are "sacrificial".

=== Religious education ===
==== School of Theology and Global Leadership (formerly School of Religion) ====
The School of Theology and Global Leadership includes majors for both men and women, although only men train as ministerial students. In 1995, 1,290 BJU graduates were serving as senior or associate pastors in churches across the United States. In 2017 more than 100 pastors in the Upstate (South Carolina) alone were BJU graduates.

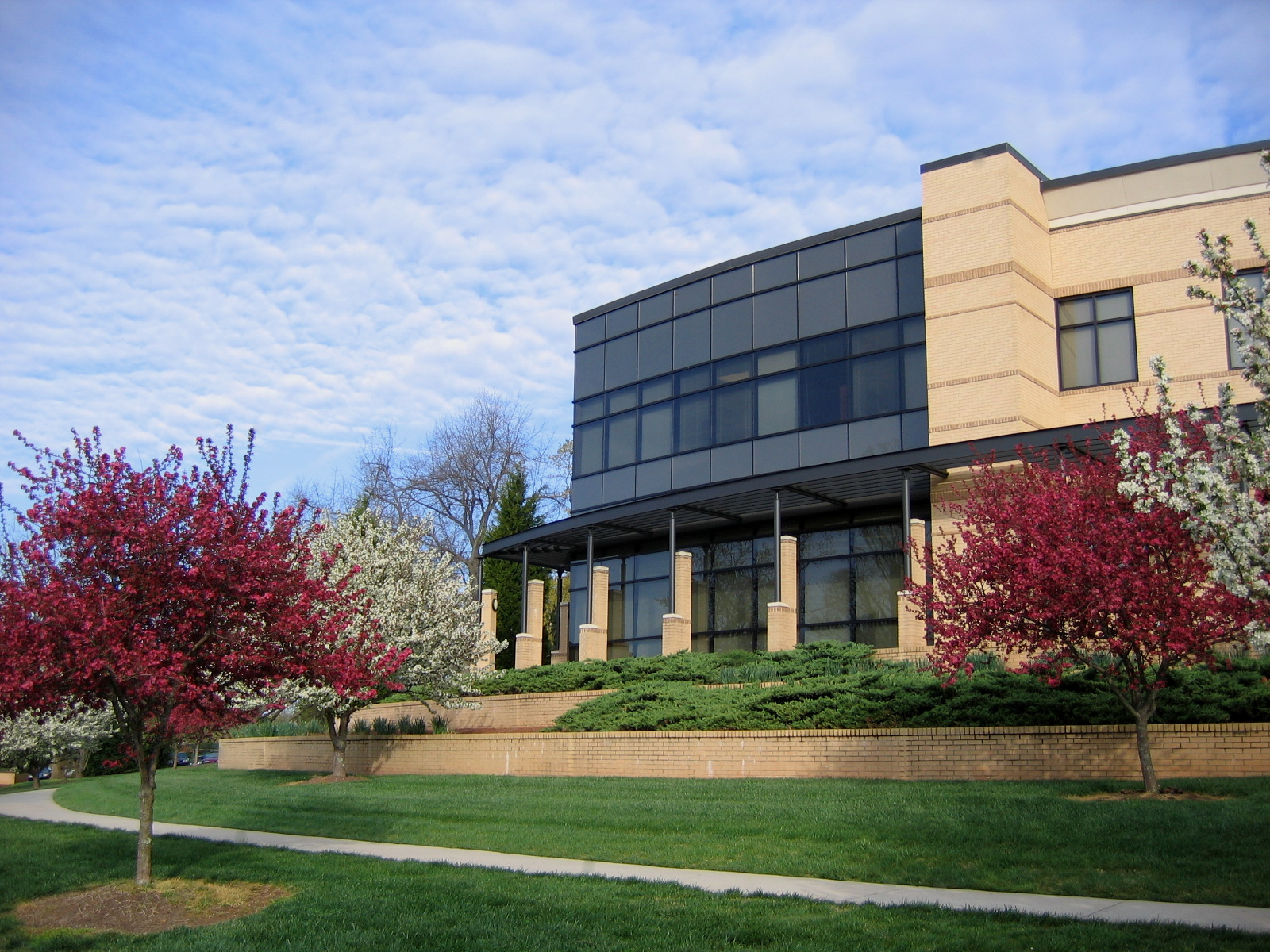
The seminary building at Bob Jones University

=== Fine arts ===
The Division of Fine Arts has the largest faculty of the university's six undergraduate schools. Each year, the university presents an opera in the spring semester and Shakespearean plays in both the fall and spring semesters. The Division of Fine Arts includes an RTV department with a campus radio and television station, WBJU. More than a hundred concerts, recitals, and laboratory theater productions are also presented annually.

Each fall, as a recruiting tool, the university sponsors a "High School Festival" in which students compete in music, art, and speech (including preaching) contests with their peers from around the country. In the spring, a similar competition sponsored by the American Association of Christian Schools, and hosted by BJU since 1977, brings thousands of national finalists to the university from around the country. In 2005, 120 of the finalists from previous years returned to BJU as freshmen.

=== Science ===
Howell Memorial Science Building

Bob Jones University supports young-earth creationism, all their biology faculty are young Earth creationists and the university rejects evolution, calling it "at best an unsupportable and unworkable hypothesis".

=== Accreditation and rankings ===
Bob Jones Sr. was leery of academic accreditation almost from the founding of the college, and by the early 1930s, he had publicly stated his opposition to holding regional accreditation. Jones and the college were criticized for this stance, and academic recognition, as well as student and faculty recruitment, were hindered.

In 1944, Jones wrote to John Walvoord of Dallas Theological Seminary that while the university had "no objection to educational work highly standardized…. We, however, cannot conscientiously let some group of educational experts or some committee of experts who may have a behavioristic or atheistic slant on education control or even influence the administrative policies of our college." Five years later, Jones reflected that "it cost us something to stay out of an association, but we stayed out. We have lived up to our convictions."

Because graduates did not benefit from accredited degrees, the faculty felt an increased responsibility to prepare their students. Early in the history of the college, there had been some hesitancy on the part of other institutions to accept BJU credits at face value, but by the 1960s, BJU alumni were being accepted by most of the major graduate and professional schools in the United States.

In 2004, the university began the process of joining the Transnational Association of Christian Colleges and Schools. Candidate status—effectively, accreditation—was obtained in April 2005, and full membership in the Association was conferred in November 2006. In December 2011, BJU announced its intention to apply for regional accreditation with the Southern Association of Colleges and Schools (SACSCOC), and it received that accreditation in 2017.

In 2025, US News ranked BJU as #17 (tie) in Regional Universities South and #4 in Best Value Schools.

=== Political involvement ===
As a twelve-year-old, Bob Jones Sr. made a twenty-minute speech in defense of the Populist Party. Jones was a friend and admirer of William Jennings Bryan but also campaigned throughout the South for Herbert Hoover (and against Al Smith) during the 1928 presidential election. The authorized history of BJU notes that both Bob Jones Sr. and Bob Jones Jr. "played political hardball" when dealing with the three municipalities in which the school was successively located. For instance, in 1962, Bob Jones Sr. warned the Greenville City Council that he had "four hundred votes in his pocket and in any election he would have control over who would be elected."

Bob Jones Sr.'s April 17, 1960, Easter Sunday sermon, broadcast on the radio, entitled "Is Segregation Scriptural?" served as the university position paper on race in the 60s, 70s, and 80s. The transcript was sent in pamphlet form in fund-raising letters and sold in the university bookstore. In the sermon, Jones states, "If you are against segregation and against racial separation, then you are against God Almighty." The school began a long history of supporting politicians who were considered aligned with racial segregation.

==== Republican Party ties ====
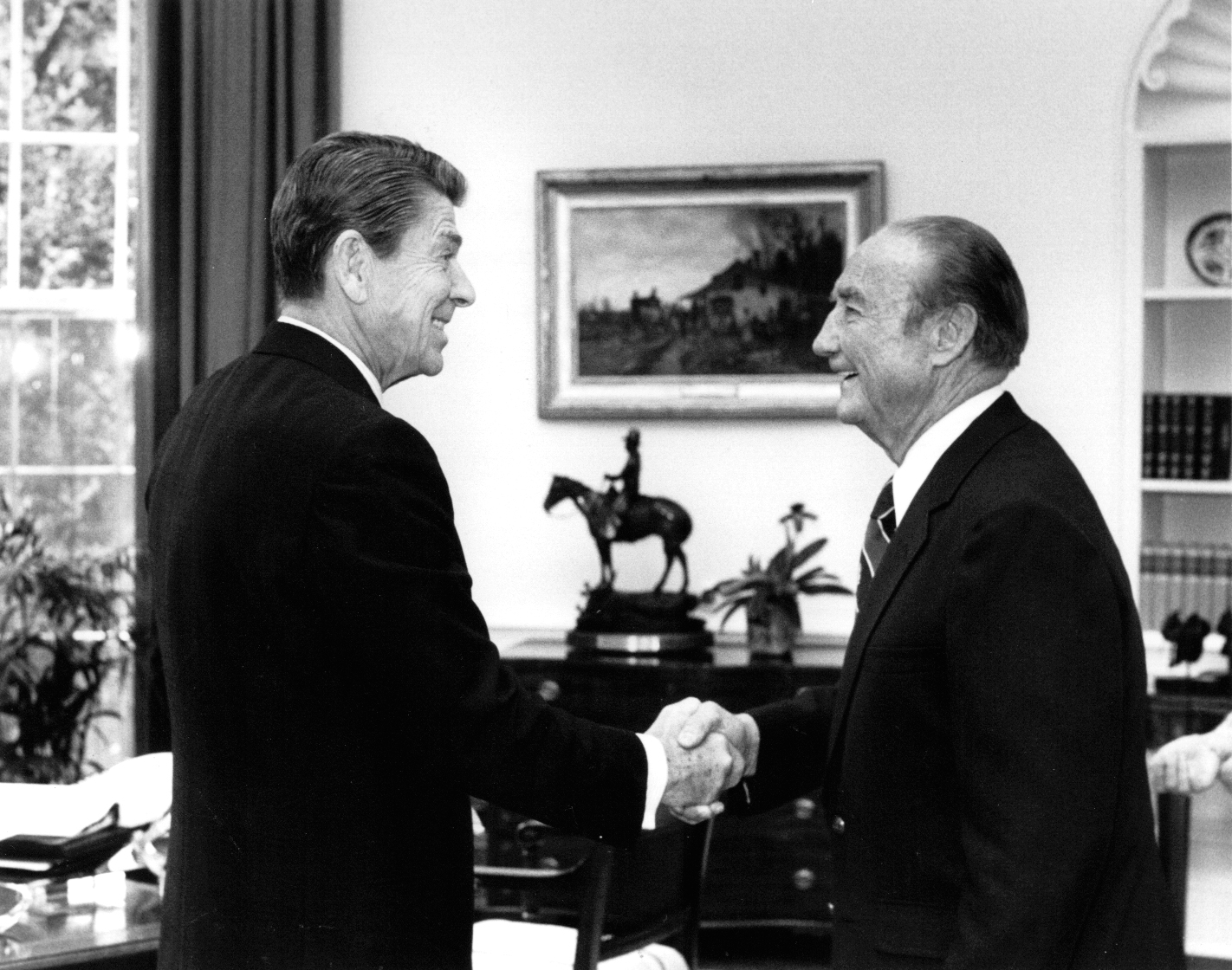
Ronald Reagan and Strom Thurmond both played influential roles in the political life of BJU.

From nearly the inception of Bob Jones College, a majority of students and faculty were from the northern United States, where there was a larger ratio of Republicans to Democrats than in the South (which was solidly Democratic). Therefore, almost from its founding year, BJU had a larger portion of Republicans than the surrounding community. After South Carolina Senator Strom Thurmond switched his allegiance to the Republican Party in 1964, BJU faculty members became increasingly influential in the new state Republican party. BJU alumni were elected to local political and party offices. In 1976, candidates supported by BJU faculty and alumni captured the local Republican party with unfortunate short-term political consequences, but by 1980 the religious right and the "country club" Republicans had joined forces. From then on, most Republican candidates for local and statewide offices sought the endorsement of Bob Jones III and greeted faculty/staff voters at the University Dining Common.

National Republicans soon followed. Ronald Reagan spoke at the school in 1980, although the Joneses supported his opponent, John Connally, in the South Carolina primary. Later, Bob Jones III denounced Reagan as "a traitor to God's people" for choosing George H. W. Bush—whom Jones called a "devil"—as his vice president. Even later, Jones III shook Bush's hand and thanked him for being a good president. In the 1990s, other Republicans such as Dan Quayle, Pat Buchanan, Phil Gramm, Bob Dole, and Alan Keyes also spoke at BJU. Democrats were rarely invited to speak at the university, in part because they took political and social positions (especially support for abortion rights) opposed by the Religious Right.

==== 2000 election ====
On February 2, 2000, then Texas Governor George W. Bush, as a candidate for president, spoke during school's chapel hour. His political opponents quickly noted his non-mention of the university's ban on interracial dating. During the Michigan primary, Bush was also criticized for not stating his opposition to the university's anti-Catholicism. The McCain campaign targeted Catholics with "Catholic Voter Alert" phone calls, reminding voters of Bush's visit to BJU. New York Republican Representative Peter King, who was supporting John McCain in the presidential primary, called Bush a tool of "anti-Catholic bigoted forces", after the visit. King described BJU as "an institution that is notorious in Ireland for awarding an honorary doctorate to Northern Ireland's tempestuous Protestant leader, Ian Paisley." Bush denied that he either knew of or approved what he regarded as BJU's intolerant policies. On February 26, Bush issued a formal letter of apology to Cardinal John Joseph O'Connor of New York for failing to denounce Bob Jones University's history of anti-Catholic statements. Bush said at a news conference following the letter's release, "I make no excuses. I had an opportunity and I missed it. I regret that....I wish I had gotten up then and seized the moment to set a tone, a tone that I had set in Texas, a positive and inclusive tone." Also during the 2000 Republican primary campaign in South Carolina, Richard Hand, a BJU professor, spread a false e-mail rumor that John McCain had fathered an illegitimate child. The McCains have an adopted daughter from Bangladesh, and later push polling also implied that the child was biracial.

==== Withdrawal from politics ====
Although the March 2007 issue of Foreign Policy listed BJU as one of "The World's Most Controversial Religious Sites" because of its past influence on American politics, BJU has seen little political controversy since Stephen Jones became president. When asked by a Newsweek reporter if he wished to play a political role, Stephen Jones replied, "It would not be my choice." Further, when asked if he felt ideologically closer to his father's engagement with politics or to other evangelicals who have tried to avoid civic involvement, Jones answered, "The gospel is for individuals. The main message we have is to individuals. We're not here to save the culture." In a 2005 Washington Post interview, Jones dodged political questions and even admitted that he was embarrassed by "some of the more vitriolic comments" made by his predecessors. "I don't want to get specific," Jones said, "But there were things said back then that I wouldn't say today." In October 2007, when Bob Jones III, as "a private citizen," endorsed Mitt Romney for the Republican nomination for president, Stephen Jones made it clear that he wished "to stay out of politics" and that neither he nor the university had endorsed anyone. Despite a hotly contested South Carolina primary, none of the candidates appeared on the platform of BJU's Founders' Memorial Amphitorium during the 2008 election cycle. In April 2008, Stephen Jones told a reporter, "I don't think I have a political bone in my body."

==== Renewed political engagement ====
In 2015 BJU reemerged as a campaign stop for conservative Republicans. Ben Carson and Ted Cruz held large on-campus rallies on two successive days in November. BJU president Steve Pettit met with Marco Rubio, Rick Perry, Mike Huckabee, and Scott Walker. Jeb Bush, Carson, Cruz, and Rubio also appeared at a 2016 Republican presidential forum at BJU. Chip Felkel, a Greenville Republican consultant, noted that some candidates closely identified "with the folks at Bob Jones. So it makes sense for them to want to be there." Nevertheless, unlike BJU's earlier periods of political involvement, Pettit did not endorse a candidate.

According to Furman University political science professor Jim Guth, because Greenville has grown so much recently, it is unlikely BJU will ever again have the same political influence it had between the 1960s and the 1980s. Nevertheless, about a quarter of all BJU graduates continue to live in the Upstate, and as long-time mayor Knox White has said, "The alumni have had a big impact on every profession and walk of life in Greenville."

== Campus ==
The university occupies 205 acres at the eastern city limit of Greenville. The institution moved into its initial 25 buildings during the 1947–48 school year, and later buildings were also faced with the light yellow brick chosen for the originals.

=== Museum and gallery ===
Bob Jones Jr. was a connoisseur of European art from his teen years and began collecting after World War II on about $30,000 a year authorized by the University Board of Directors. Jones first concentrated on the Italian Baroque, a style then out of favor and relatively inexpensive in the years immediately following the war. The museum's collection currently includes more than 400 European paintings from the 14th through the 19th centuries, period furniture, and a notable collection of Russian icons. The museum also includes a variety of Holy Land antiquities. The gallery is strong in Baroque paintings and includes notable works by Rubens, Tintoretto, Veronese, Cranach, Gerard David, Murillo, Mattia Preti, Ribera, van Dyck, and Gustave Doré. Included in the Museum & Gallery collection are seven large canvases, part of a series by Benjamin West painted for George III, called "The Progress of Revealed Religion", which are displayed in the War Memorial Chapel. The museum also includes a variety of Holy Land antiquities collected in the early 20th century by missionaries Frank and Barbara Bowen.

Every Easter, the university and the Museum & Gallery present the Living Gallery, a series of tableaux vivants recreating noted works of religious art using live models disguised as part of two-dimensional paintings.

BJU has been criticized by some fundamentalists for promoting "false Catholic doctrine" through its art gallery because much of Baroque art was created for the Counter-Reformation.

A painting by Lucas van Leyden that had been displayed in the gallery's collection for more than ten years and had been consigned to Sotheby's for sale was recognized by Interpol as art that had been stolen by the Nazis from the Mittelrhein-Museum in Koblenz. The painting was eventually returned to Germany after months of negotiations between the Mittelrhein-Museum and Julius H. Weitzner, a dealer in Old Master paintings.

After the death of Bob Jones Jr., Erin Jones, the wife of BJU president Stephen Jones, became director. According to David Steel, curator of European art at the North Carolina Museum of Art, Erin Jones "brought that museum into the modern era", employing "a top-notch curator, John Nolan", and following "best practices in conservation and restoration". The museum cooperates with other institutions, lending works for outside shows such as a Rembrandt exhibit in 2011.

In 2008, the BJU Museum & Gallery opened a satellite location, the Museum & Gallery at Heritage Green near downtown Greenville, which featured rotating exhibitions from the main museum and interactive children's activities. In February 2017, the Museum & Gallery closed both locations permanently. In 2018, the museum announced that a new home would be built at a yet undetermined located off the BJU campus. In 2021, Erin Jones said the museum was exploring a permanent home near the proposed downtown conference center.

=== Library ===
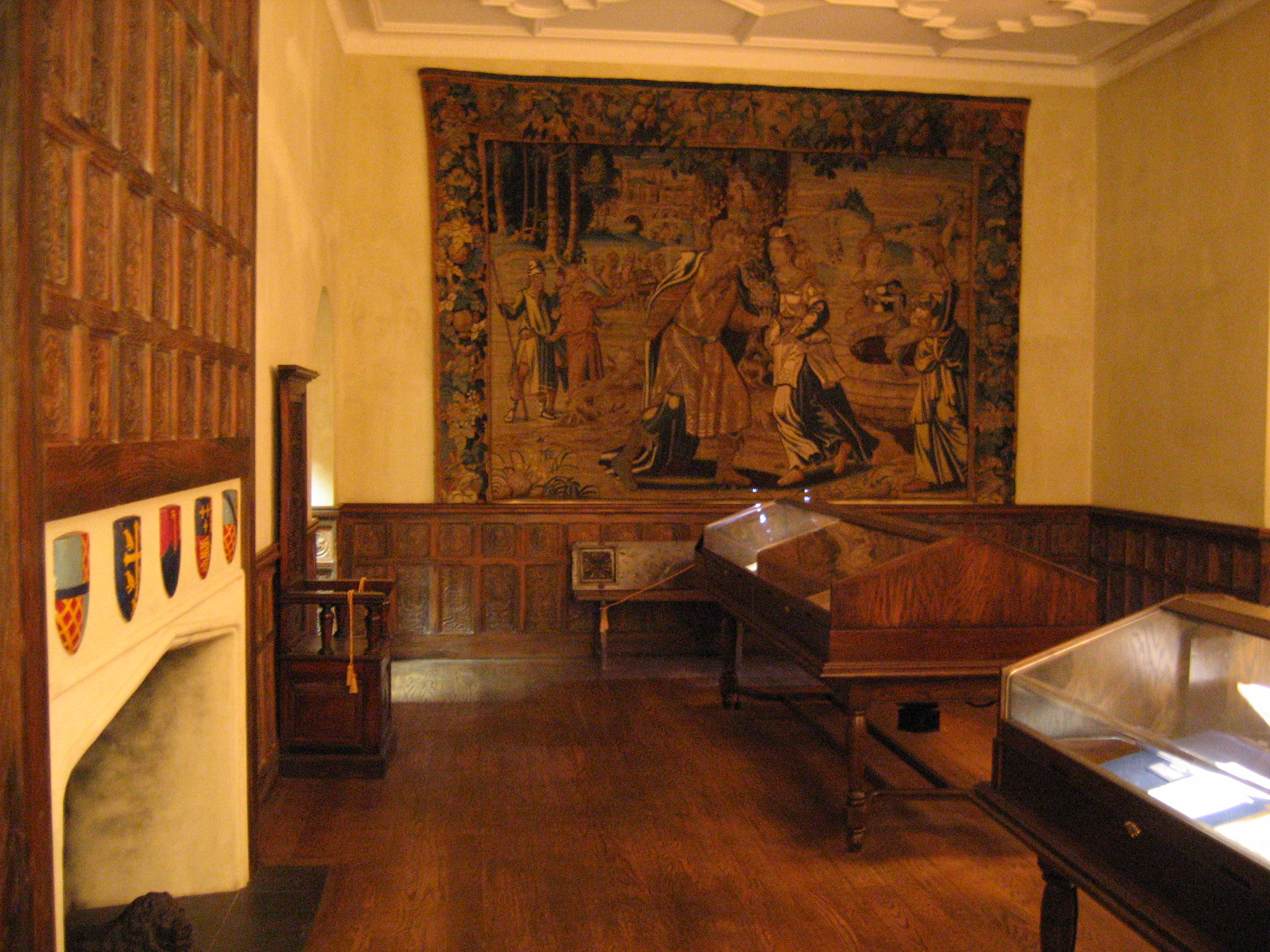
Jerusalem Chamber, Mack Library, containing a collection of rare Bibles

The 90,000-square-foot (8,400 m^{2}) Mack Library (named for John Sephus Mack) holds a collection of more than 300,000 books and includes seating for 1,200 as well as a computer lab and a computer classroom. (Its ancillary, a music library, is included in the Gustafson Fine Arts Center.) Mack Library's Special Collections includes an American Hymnody Collection of about 700 titles. The "Jerusalem Chamber" is a replica of the room in Westminster Abbey in which work on the King James Version of the Bible was conducted, and it displays a collection of rare Bibles. An adjoining Memorabilia Room commemorates the life of Bob Jones Sr. and the history of the university.

The library's Fundamentalism File collects periodical articles and ephemera about social and religious matters of interest to evangelicals and fundamentalists. The University Archives holds copies of all university publications, oral histories of faculty and staff members, surviving remnants of university correspondence, and pictures and artifacts related to the Jones family and the history of the university.

== Ancillary ministries ==
=== Unusual Films ===
Both Bob Jones Sr. and Bob Jones Jr. believed that film could be an excellent medium for mass evangelism, and in 1950, the university established Unusual Films within the School of Fine Arts. (The studio name derives from a former BJU promotional slogan, "The World's Most Unusual University".) Bob Jones Jr. selected a speech teacher, Katherine Stenholm, as the first director. Although she had no experience in cinema, she took summer courses at the University of Southern California and received personal instruction from Hollywood specialists, such as Rudolph Sternad.

Unusual Films has produced seven feature-length films, each with an evangelistic emphasis: Wine of Morning, Red Runs the River, Flame in the Wind, Sheffey, Beyond the Night, The Printing, and Milltown Pride. Wine of Morning (1955), based on a novel by Bob Jones Jr., represented the United States at the Cannes Film Festival. The first four films are historical dramas set, respectively, in the time of Christ, the U.S. Civil War, 16th-century Spain, and the late 19th-century South—the latter a fictionalized treatment of the life of Methodist evangelist, Robert Sayers Sheffey. Beyond the Night closely follows an actual 20th-century missionary saga in Central Africa, and The Printing uses composite characters to portray the persecution of believers in the former Soviet Union. According to The Dove Foundation, The Printing "no doubt will urge Christian believers everywhere to appreciate the freedoms they enjoy. It is inspiring!" In 1999, Unusual Films began producing feature films for children, including The Treasure Map, Project Dinosaur, and Appalachian Trial.

=== BJU Press ===
BJU Press originated from the need for textbooks for the burgeoning Christian school and homeschool movements. BJU Press publishes a full range of K–12 textbooks.

BJU Press also offers distance learning courses online, via DVD and hard drive. Another ancillary, the Academy of Home Education, is a "service organization for homeschooling families" that maintains student records, administers achievement testing, and issues high school diplomas. The press sold its music division, SoundForth, to Lorenz Publishing on October 1, 2012.

=== Pre-college programs ===
The university operates Bob Jones Academy, which enrolls students from preschool through 12th grade. With about 1100 students, the school's demographic makeup leans heavily white (90.3%), with non-Black minorities making up the bulk of other ethnicities. Black students make up 0.5% of enrollment.

== Controversies ==
=== Sexual abuse reports ===
In December 2011, in response to accusations of mishandling of student reports of sexual abuse (most of which had occurred in their home churches when the students were minors) and a concurrent reporting issue at a church pastored by a university board member, the BJU board of trustees hired an independent ombudsman, GRACE (Godly Response to Abuse in the Christian Environment), to investigate. Released in December 2014, the GRACE report suggested that BJU had discouraged students from reporting past sexual abuse, and though the university declined to implement many of the report's recommendations, President Steve Pettit formally apologized "to those who felt they did not receive from us genuine love, compassion, understanding, and support after suffering sexual abuse or assault". The university's mishandling of sexual abuse in the past came into light again in August 2020 when a student filed a lawsuit against Bob Jones University and Furman University alleging both administrations ignored the sexual assault report and expelled the student for consuming alcohol, which is against the Student Code of Conduct handbook.

=== Racial policies and ban on interracial dating ===
Although BJU had admitted Asian students and other ethnic groups from its inception, it did not enroll Black students until 1971. From 1971 to 1975, BJU admitted only married Black people. However, the Internal Revenue Service (IRS) had already determined in 1970 that "private schools with racially discriminatory admissions policies" were not entitled to federal tax exemption. In 1975, the University Board of Trustees authorized a policy change to admit Black students, a move that occurred shortly before the announcement of the Supreme Court decision in Runyon v. McCrary (427 U.S. 160 [1976]), which prohibited racial exclusion in private schools. In May 1975, BJU expanded rules against interracial dating and marriage.

In 1976, the Internal Revenue Service revoked the university's tax exemption retroactively to December 1, 1970, because it practiced racial discrimination. The case was heard by the U.S. Supreme Court in 1982. After BJU lost the decision in Bob Jones University v. United States (461 U.S. 574)[1983], the university chose to maintain its interracial dating policy and pay a million dollars in back taxes. The year following the Court decision, contributions to the university declined by 13 percent.

Sixteen years later, in 2000, there was a media uproar prompted by the visit of presidential candidate George W. Bush to the university. Following this, Bob Jones III dropped the university's interracial dating rule and announced the change on CNN's Larry King Live. In the same year, Bob Jones III drew criticism after reposting a letter on the university's web page referring to Mormons and Catholics as being members of "cults which call themselves Christian".

In 2005, Stephen Jones, great-grandson of the founder, became BJU's president. Bob Jones III then took the title Chancellor. In 2008, the university declared itself "profoundly sorry" for having allowed "institutional policies to remain in place that were racially hurtful".

In his first meeting with the university cabinet in 2014, the fifth president Steve Pettit said it was appropriate for BJU to regain its tax-exempt status because BJU no longer held its earlier positions about race. "The Bible is clear," said Pettit, "We are made of one blood." By February 17, 2017, the IRS website had listed the university as a 501(c)(3) organization, and by May 2017, BJU had forged a working relationship with Greenville's Phillis Wheatley Center. In 2017, 9% of the student body was "from the American minority population".

== Student life ==
=== Religious atmosphere ===
"I believe in the inspiration of the Bible (both the Old and the New Testaments); the creation of man by the direct act of God; the incarnation and virgin birth of our Lord and Saviour, Jesus Christ; His identification as the Son of God; His vicarious atonement for the sins of mankind by the shedding of His blood on the cross; the resurrection of His body from the tomb; His power to save men from sin; the new birth through the regeneration by the Holy Spirit; and the gift of eternal life by the grace of God."

— BJU Creed

Religion is a major aspect of life and curriculum at BJU. The BJU Creed, written in 1927 by journalist and prohibitionist Sam Small, is recited by students and faculty four days a week at chapel services.

The university also encourages church planting in areas of the United States "in great need of fundamental churches", and it has provided financial and logistical assistance to ministerial graduates in starting more than a hundred new churches. Bob Jones III has also encouraged non-ministerial students to put their career plans on hold for two or three years to provide lay leadership for small churches. Students of various majors participate in Missions Advance (formerly Mission Prayer Band), an organization that prays for missionaries and attempts to stimulate campus interest in world evangelism. During summers and Christmas breaks, about 150 students participate in teams that promote Christian missions around the world. Although a separate nonprofit corporation, Gospel Fellowship Association, an organization founded by Bob Jones Sr. and associated with BJU, is one of the largest fundamentalist mission boards in the country. Through its "Timothy Fund", the university also sponsors international students who are training for the ministry.

The university uses the King James Version (KJV) of the Bible in its services and classrooms, but it does not hold that the KJV is the only acceptable English translation or that it has the same authority as the original Hebrew and Greek manuscripts. The university's position has been criticized by some other fundamentalists, including fellow conservative university Pensacola Christian College, which in 1998 produced a widely distributed videotape which argued that this "defiling leaven in fundamentalism" was passed from the 19th-century Princeton theologian Benjamin B. Warfield through Charles Brokenshire to current BJU faculty members and graduates.

=== Rules of conduct ===
Strict rules govern student life at BJU. The 2026–27 Student Handbook states, "Students are to avoid any types of entertainment that could be considered immodest or that contain profanity, scatological realism, sexual perversion, erotic realism, lurid violence, occultism and false philosophical or religious assumptions." Offenses that may result in a suspension from the university—defined by the inability to return for one full semester and a restriction from campus—include immorality, sensual behavior, use of alcohol or drugs, stealing or shoplifting, committing a crime while enrolled or not disclosing a crime committed before enrollment, or encouraging or aiding another student in an action that results in suspension. The accumulation of two suspensions results in a permanent expulsion from the university. Similar "moral failures" are grounds for terminating the employment of faculty and staff. In 1998, a homosexual alumnus was threatened with arrest if he visited the campus.

The campus implements a business casual attire policy for class hours, defined by weekdays until 17:00, with the intent of demonstrating the serious focus on the academic coursework of the university in a manner that is consistent with the value placed on education. Men are to wear tucked-in button down or polo shirts with khaki or chino pants (or something similar), a belt, and closed-toe shoes with socks. Women are to wear either a blouse/shirt/crewneck with pants or a skirt or a dress. All students are also required to attend chapel three days a week, as well as at least two services per week at an approved "local fundamental church".

Other rules are not based on a specific biblical passage. For instance, the Handbook notes that "there is no specific Bible command that says, 'Thou shalt not be late to class', but a student who wishes to display orderliness and concern for others will not come in late to the distraction of the teacher and other students." In 2008 a campus spokesperson said that one goal of the dress code was "to teach our young people to dress professionally" on campus while giving them "the ability to...choose within the biblically accepted options of dress" when they were off campus.

Additional rules include requiring resident hall students to abide by a campus curfew of 11:00 pm on class days and 12:00 am on weekends. Students are requested to limit the ratings of movies they watch in both their dorms and at movie theaters to G or PG to discourage the entertainment of language and sexual content that is not encouraged by the university. Students are also requested to avoid popular contemporary music that is not conservative in nature. Male students may have facial hair that is neatly trimmed and well maintained. Men and women are expected to dress modestly and wear business professional attire to class and religious services.

=== Extracurriculars ===
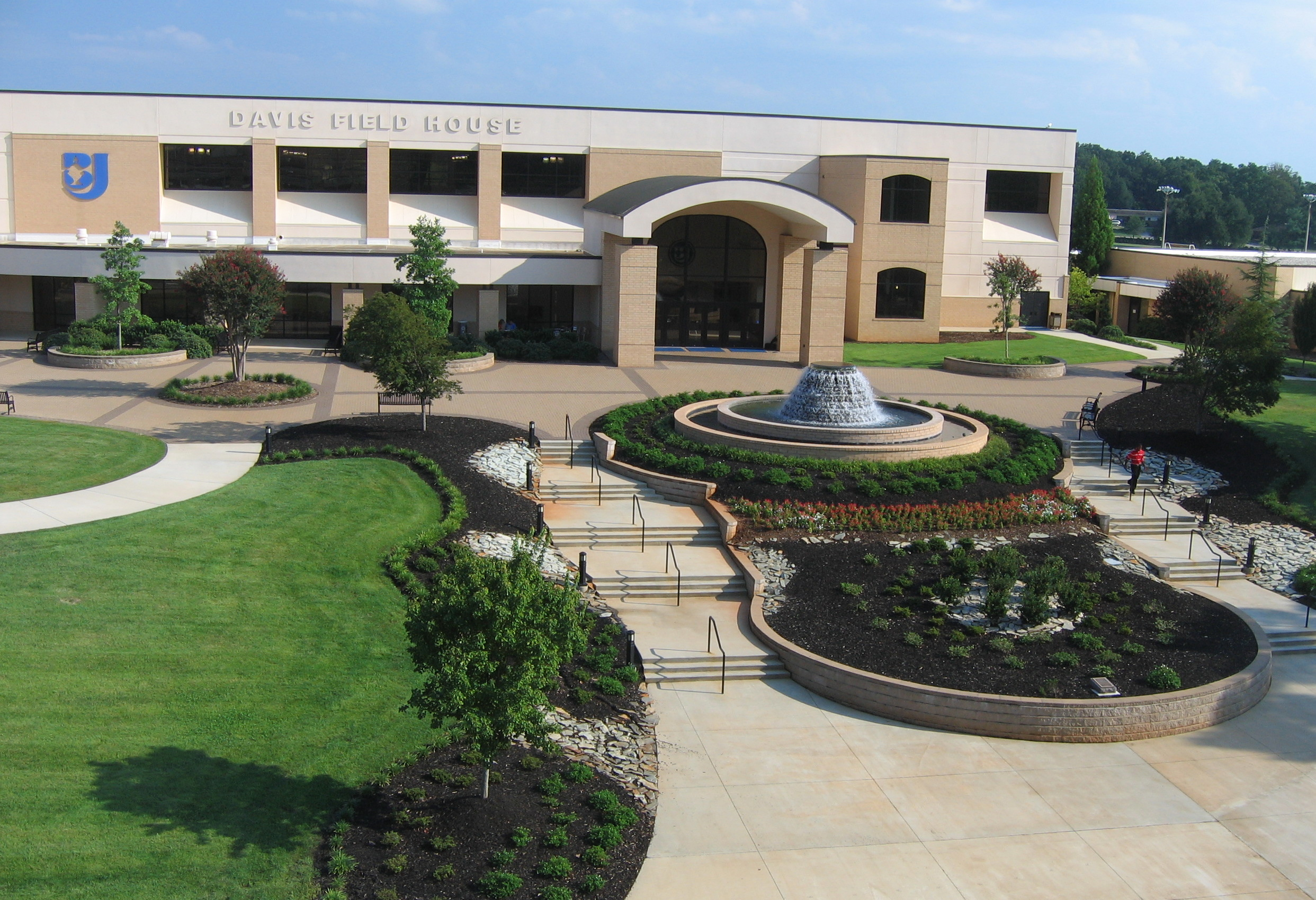
Davis Field House

After BJU initially abandoned intercollegiate sports in 1933, its intramural sports program included competition in soccer, basketball, softball, volleyball, tennis, badminton, flag football, table tennis, racquetball, and water polo. The university also competed in intercollegiate debate within the National Educational Debate Association, in intercollegiate mock trial and computer science competitions, and participated at South Carolina Student Legislature. In 2012, BJU joined Division I of National Christian College Athletic Association (NCCAA) and in 2014 participated in intercollegiate soccer, basketball, cross-country, and golf. The teams are known as the Bruins.

The university requires all unmarried incoming first-year students under 23 to join one of 33 "societies". Societies meet most Fridays for entertainment and fellowship and hold weekly prayer meetings. Societies compete with one another in intramural sports, debate, and Scholastic Bowl. The university also has a student-staffed newspaper (The Collegian), and yearbook (Vintage).

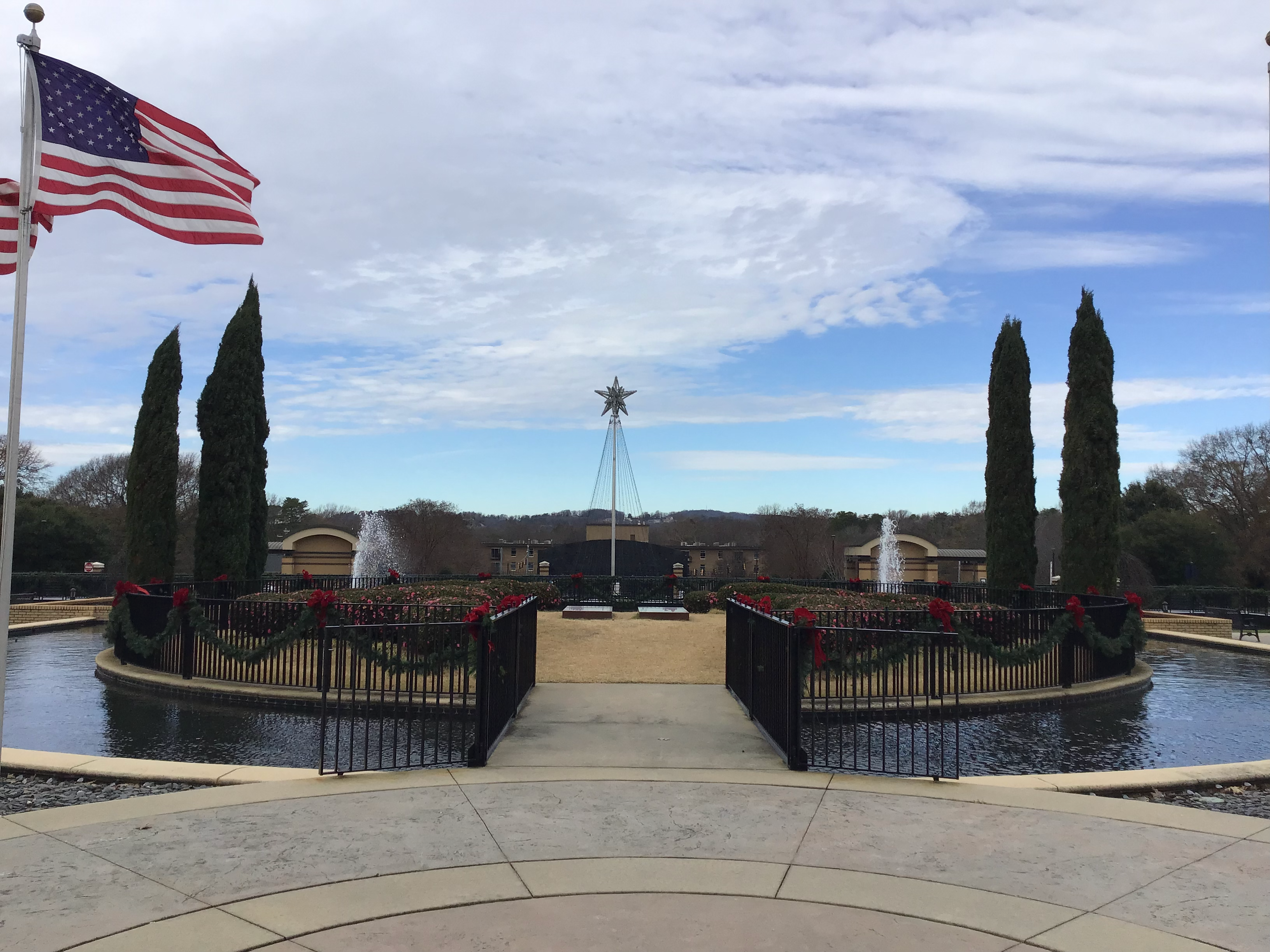
Location of the world record for most carolers

Early in December, thousands of students, faculty, and visitors gather around the front campus fountain for an annual Christmas carol singing and lighting ceremony, illuminating tens of thousands of Christmas lights. On December 3, 2004, the ceremony broke the Guinness World Record for Christmas caroling with 7,514 carolers.

Before 2015, the university required students and faculty to attend a six-day Bible Conference instead of a traditional Spring Break. However, the university announced that beginning in 2016, it would hold the Bible Conference in February and give students a week of Spring Break in March. The Conference typically attracts fundamentalist preachers and laypeople from around the country, and some BJU class reunions are held during the week. The week is also used as a time for student-organized fundraisers for a collective missions project. In 2026, over $125,000 was cumulatively raised for two missions projects, being an evangelism project during the FIFA World Cup and the building of an airplane for a team of gospel missionaries in Papua New Guinea.

== Athletics ==
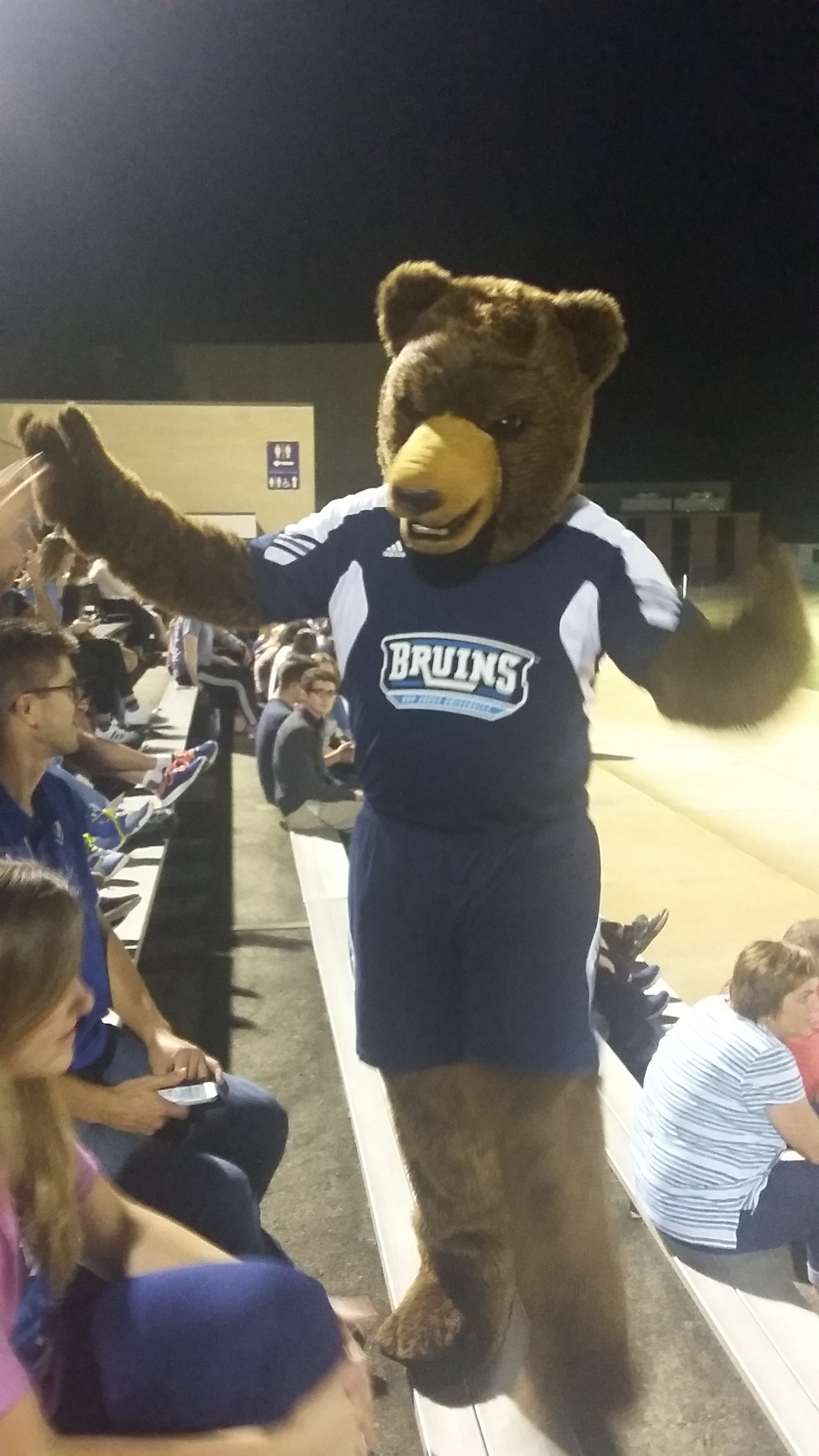
Mascot, Brody the Bruin, at a soccer game

The Bob Jones (BJU) athletic teams are called the Bruins. The university is a member of the National Christian College Athletic Association (NCCAA), primarily competing in the South Region of the Division II level.

The Bruins previously competed as a member of the NCAA Division III ranks, primarily competing as an NCAA D-III Independent from 2020–21 to 2022–23.

BJU competes in 11 intercollegiate varsity sports. Men's sports include basketball, baseball, cross-country, golf, soccer, and track & field, while women's sports include basketball, cross-country, soccer, track & field, and volleyball.

=== History ===
In 2012, the university inaugurated intercollegiate athletics with four teams: men's soccer, men's basketball, women's soccer, and women's basketball. The university added intercollegiate golf and cross-country teams during the 2013–2014 school year. Men's and women's shooting sports were added in 2016. Men's baseball began in the spring of 2021, and women's beach volleyball started in the spring of 2022. Director of athletics Neal Ring resigned in 2023; he had overseen Bruins Athletics since inception.

Through its first 13 seasons, the athletic department amassed 32 NCCAA National Championships, over 150 All-Americans, and nearly 300 Scholar-Athletes. Bruins Athletics also received nine straight Presidential Awards for Excellence, honoring the most successful NCCAA DII athletics program.

=== Move to NCAA Division III ===
In 2018, BJU explored National Collegiate Athletic Association (NCAA) membership and applied for it in January 2020. The Bruins were accepted as Division III provisional members in June for three years, making it the only Division III school in the state. The school has been searching for a conference.

== Notable people ==
=== Alumni ===
A number of BJU graduates have become influential within evangelical Christianity, including Ken Hay (founder of "The Wilds" Christian camps) Ron "Patch" Hamilton (composer and president of Majesty Music) Billy Kim (former president of Baptist World Alliance), and Moisés Silva (president of the Evangelical Theological Society). BJU alumni also include the third pastor (1968–1976) of Riverside Church (Ernest T. Campbell), the former president of Northland Baptist Bible College (Les Ollila), late president of Baptist Bible College (Ernest Pickering), and the former president of Clearwater Christian College (Richard Stratton).

BJU alumnus Asa Hutchinson served as the governor of Arkansas and also served in the U.S. Congress; his brother Tim Hutchinson served in the U.S. Senate. Others have served in state government: Michigan state senator Alan Cropsey, former Pennsylvania state representative Gordon Denlinger (subsequently Pennsylvania Deputy Auditor General for Audits), Pennsylvania state representative Mark M. Gillen, former Speaker Pro Tempore of the South Carolina House of Representatives Terry Haskins, member of the South Carolina House of Representatives Wendy Nanney, Pennsylvania state representative Sam Rohrer, member of the Missouri House of Representatives Ryan Silvey, Maryland state senator Bryan Simonaire and his daughter, state delegate Meagan Simonaire, and South Carolina state senator Danny Verdin.

== Bibliography ==
- Dalhouse, Mark Taylor (1996). An Island in the Lake of Fire: Bob Jones University, Fundamentalism & the Separatist Movement. University of Georgia Press. ISBN 0-8203-1815-9.
- Johnson, R.K. (1982). Builder of Bridges: The Biography of Dr. Bob Jones Sr. BJU Press. ISBN 0-89084-157-8.
- Jones Jr., Bob (1985). Cornbread and Caviar. BJU Press. ISBN 0-89084-306-6.
- Turner, Daniel L. (1997). Standing Without Apology: The History of Bob Jones University. BJU Press. ISBN 1-57924-710-5.
- Wright, Melton (1984). Fortress of Faith: The Story of Bob Jones University. BJU Press. ISBN 0-89084-252-3.
