= Bob Jones III =

Third president of Bob Jones University

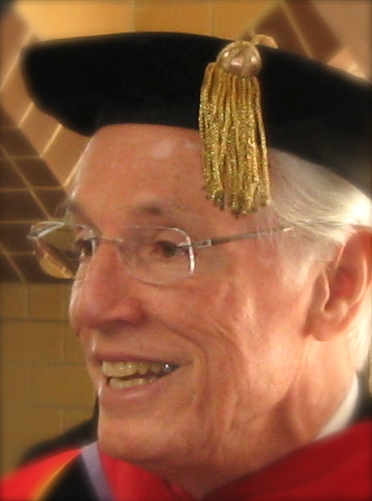
- Jones in 2011

3rd President of Bob Jones University
- In office 1971–2005
- Preceded by: Bob Jones Jr.
- Succeeded by: Stephen Jones

Personal details
- Born: Robert Reynolds Jones III; August 8, 1939 (age 87) Cleveland, Tennessee, U.S.
- Spouses: Beneth Peters (m. 1959; died 2019); Karen Rowe (m. 2020)
- Children: 3, including Stephen Jones
- Education: Bob Jones University
- Profession: College chancellor, clergyman

Robert Reynolds Jones III (born August 8, 1939) is an American academic administrator, preacher, and writer. The son of Bob Jones Jr. and grandson of Bob Jones Sr., he served as the third president of Bob Jones University from 1971 to 2005.

== Biography ==
Jones was born in Cleveland, Tennessee, the son of Fannie May (Holmes) and Bob Jones Jr. He moved with his family to Greenville, South Carolina in 1947 when Bob Jones College built a new campus and became Bob Jones University. Because his father was a connoisseur of the arts, Jones early visited Europe and the Levant on his father's summer tours. As a teenager, Jones was given minor roles in campus Shakespeare performances and a major role in the film version of his father's novel Wine of Morning. Likewise, as the son and grandson of well-known fundamentalists, Jones met many politicians and notable preachers in his youth.

At fifteen, his father rusticated Jones to a summer camp sponsored by Ernest Reveal, a BJU board member and the founder of the Evansville Rescue Mission, where Jones preached and otherwise participated in the camp's evangelistic ministry to children experiencing poverty from the Evansville area. Jones credited this experience with having had a significant impact on his later career.

Jones completed his Bachelor of Arts (1959) and Master of Arts (1961) in speech from Bob Jones University and took additional courses in speech and drama at Northwestern University and New York University. He also received honorary degrees from two small Bible schools and a seminary.

Jones excelled academically. Unlike his father, though, Jones also developed an interest in athletics — basketball as a young man, and later skiing, hunting, and other outdoor sports. Jones enjoyed flying and considered a military career.

Nevertheless, by the end of his undergraduate years, Jones believed that he had been called to "help perpetuate the ideals and standards" of the school his grandfather founded. Jones served as a teaching assistant in the speech department and then as a dormitory supervisor. Between 1961 and 1971, his father provided him with a growing administrative role in the university, including preaching for campus services. Jones also accepted an increasing number of off-campus speaking invitations.

Unlike his father, Jones became genuinely interested in the mechanics of university administration, although his training for his college presidency was, like his father's, informal at best. To help with business judgments, Jones eventually appointed a personal friend and former businessperson, Bob Wood, as vice president. Rather shy and "reticent to initiate conversations with strangers", Jones was also a highly competitive, 'Type A' personality who regularly worked sixteen hours a day during his presidency. In conjunction with the university's 70th-anniversary celebration, Governor David Beasley presented him with the Order of the Palmetto.

Jones inherited the Bob Jones University presidency as its enrollment increased. However, the school also began to face the federal government's opposition to its racial policies. During the early 1980s, Jones was frequently interviewed by the media, arguing that the university's racial policies were protected by First Amendment rights. Nevertheless, Jones had difficulty finding a route of escape from the positions on race that his predecessors had adopted during the period of segregation in the early twentieth-century South, and which he had endorsed in his youth.

In December 2014, as part of a BJU-commissioned investigation to determine if students had "received inadequate help when they reported to a BJU representative that they had been abused or assaulted at some point in their past," G.R.A.C.E. (Godly Response to Abuse in the Christian Environment), an independent Christian organization, reported that Jones III had "repeatedly demonstrated a significant lack of understanding regarding the many painful dynamics associated with sexual abuse" and recommended BJU take "personnel action" against him.

Until her death in 2019, Jones was married to Beneth Peters, an author and seminar speaker, whom he had gotten to know when she played Roxane to his Christian in a campus performance of Cyrano de Bergerac. They had three children. In March 2020, he married Karen Rowe, a member of the BJU English faculty. Jones's younger son, Stephen, replaced him as president of BJU in May 2005 when Jones took the title, "Chancellor."

Jones remains chair of the International Testimony to an Infallible Bible and chair of the board of directors of the Bob Jones University Museum & Gallery. Jones continues to speak regularly for churches, schools, evangelistic campaigns, youth rallies, and other religious gatherings in his eighties.

== Religious, political, and social views ==
- Jones once declared that BJU had banned interracial dating because "God has separated people for His own purpose"; nevertheless, on March 3, 2000, he announced on Larry King Live that the university would abandon the long-standing rule over which the university had forfeited its federal tax-exempt status in 1983.
- In 1980, Jones said homosexuality would be solved "posthaste if homosexuals were stoned." In March 2015, he issued a public apology for this statement, saying in part that it was, "antithetical to my theology and my 50 years of preaching a redeeming Christ. Upon now reading these long-forgotten words, they seem to me as words belonging to a total stranger — were my name not attached. I cannot erase them, but wish I could, because they do not represent the belief of my heart or the content of my preaching. Neither before, nor since, that event in 1980 have I ever advocated the stoning of sinners."
- In 1982, when asked by TV talk show host Phil Donahue, "Does anybody get to heaven if he's not born again?" Jones replied, "Absolutely not. Jesus told Nicodemus, a religious man, 'You must be born again.'...The Lord Jesus said, 'I am the way, the truth and the life. No man cometh to the Father, but by me.'"
- In the 1980s, Jones once denounced Ronald Reagan as "a traitor to God's people" for choosing as his vice president George H. W. Bush, whom Jones called "a devil." Some years later, however, while visiting the Oval Office, he thanked the elder Bush for being a good president. In a Washington Post article published in 2005, he was quoted as saying, "I was not convinced that the first George Bush was a real conservative. I was afraid that he had ties to certain organizations that revealed what he really was, that his public rhetoric was hiding what he really was. And devils deal in treachery like that, in deceit. 'Devil' may have been a strong word, but you know what? He turned out to be a whole lot better president than I expected, and I shook his hand in the Oval Office and thanked him for being a good president."
- Jones referred to Catholicism as "the religion of the anti-Christ and a Satanic system" and called Mormonism and Catholicism "cults which call themselves Christian". In October 2007, he endorsed former Massachusetts Governor Mitt Romney, a devout Mormon, for the Republican nomination for president.
- Shortly after George W. Bush won re-election in 2004, Bob Jones III sent a congratulatory letter to the president declaring that he had "been given a mandate....Put your agenda on the front burner and let it boil. You owe the liberals nothing. They despise you because they despise your Christ."
- In 2011, referring to Barack Obama's religion, Jones said, "Some people will say whatever they think the politically helpful thing would be.... I say, 'Where is the evidence that he is a Christian?'"
- Jones' most often repeated quotation: "The most sobering reality in the world today is that people are dying and going to Hell today."

Academic offices
Preceded by Bob Jones Jr.	President of Bob Jones University; 1971–2005	Succeeded by Stephen Jones
