= Bob Jones Jr. =

2nd President of Bob Jones University

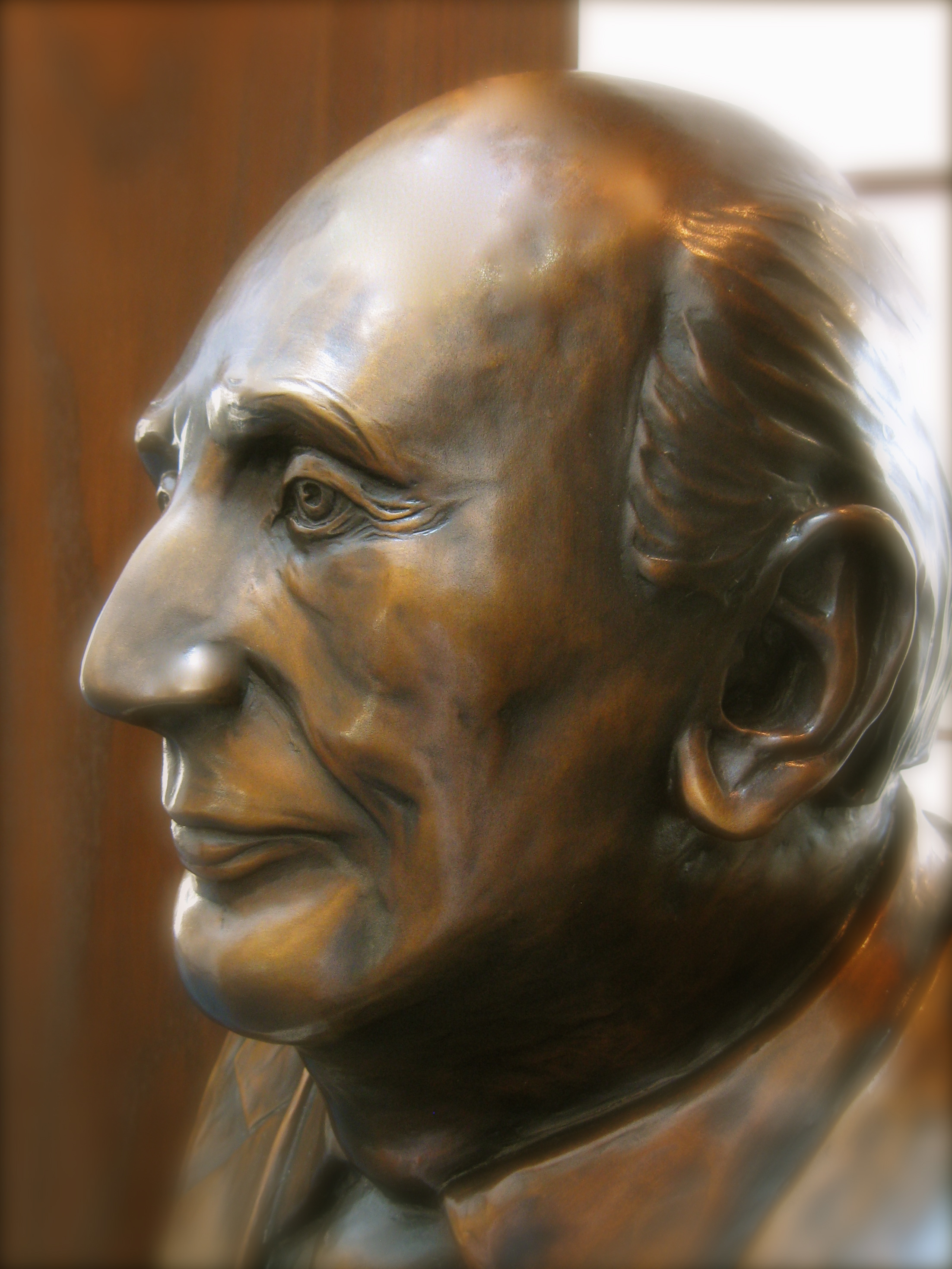

2nd President of Bob Jones University
- In office 1947–1971
- Preceded by: Bob Jones Sr.
- Succeeded by: Bob Jones III

Personal details
- Born: Robert Reynolds Jones Jr. October 19, 1911 Montgomery, Alabama
- Died: November 12, 1997 (aged 86) Greenville, South Carolina
- Spouse: Fannie May Holmes
- Children: 3, including Bob Jones III
- Education: Starke's University School; University of Pittsburgh; University of Chicago; Northwestern University
- Profession: College president, actor, art collector

Robert Reynolds Jones Jr. (October 19, 1911 – November 12, 1997) was the second president and chancellor of Bob Jones University. Born in Montgomery, Alabama, Jones was the son of Bob Jones Sr., the university's founder. He served as president from 1947 to 1971 and then as chancellor until his death.

== Education ==
Educated by tutors and at Starke University School in Montgomery, Jones was a voracious reader. When he was ten years old, his father gave him 50 missionary biographies for Christmas, which the boy finished by February.

After graduating from Bob Jones College in 1931, when he was nineteen, Jones earned a master's degree in history at the University of Pittsburgh (1933) and did further graduate work at the University of Chicago Divinity School and Northwestern University. Jones was often called "Dr. Bob Jr." during his lifetime, although he disliked the "Jr." and his doctorates were honorary, the first conferred by Asbury College in 1934, when he was only twenty-three.

== Early career ==
As a young man Jones became an accomplished Shakespearean actor and studied at Stratford-upon-Avon. He considered turning professional and even received an offer from Hollywood—thereby causing some anxious moments for his evangelist father. Jones Jr. did create a one-man show he called "Curtain Calls", in which he portrayed seven or eight Shakespearean characters accompanied by classical music, scheduling performances four weeks a year from 1933 to 1945.

Jones believed that his primary calling was helping his father administer Bob Jones College. Administration per se seems to have held little interest for him; at least his autobiography contains virtually no mention of his college presidency. Nevertheless, Jones seems to have directed the school more autocratically after 1953, when the assistant of Bob Jones Sr., Theodore Mercer, was fired, allegedly for trying to lead a faculty rebellion against the Joneses.

== Fundamentalist leader ==
Both Jones's position and his intellectual gifts made him a natural leader of separatist fundamentalism. Although he participated in the founding of the National Association of Evangelicals (NAE) in 1942 and was elected vice president in 1950, Jones left the organization in the following year because of its interest in cultivating a more moderate—to Jones, "compromising"—stance with those who denied biblical orthodoxy. By 1959, Jones had formally broken with Billy Graham, who had accepted the sponsorship of liberal Protestants and Roman Catholics for his 1957 New York City crusade. Later Jones criticized other fundamentalists who were insufficiently separatistic, such as evangelist John R. Rice and Jerry Falwell, whose Moral Majority had embraced Catholics and Mormons.

Meanwhile, Jones became a close friend of militant Ulster Protestant leader Ian Paisley. In 1982, when U. S. Secretary of State Alexander Haig refused to grant a travel visa for Paisley to speak at the university's annual Bible Conference, Jones used strong language from the imprecatory Psalms to denounce Haig, urging God to "destroy him utterly." The flap was widely reported in the media, and Jones was "swamped with vituperative mail" until Haig made a serious blunder less than three months later and was forced to leave office, effectively ending his political career.

For thirteen years Jones edited Faith for the Family (1973–1986), an issues-oriented fundamentalist periodical that he originated and then eventually discontinued because of its cost. He wrote poetry in traditional forms, including Prologue, a blank-verse drama on the life of John Huss, as well as several hymn texts (set to music by Dwight Gustafson and Joan Pinkston) that are known to a wider fundamentalist community beyond the BJU campus.

== Art connoisseur ==
Jones was a connoisseur of European art; he bought his first Russian icon at age thirteen. He began collecting seriously after World War II on a budget of about $30,000 a year, authorized by the University Board of Directors. Jones first concentrated on the Italian Baroque, a style then out of favor and relatively inexpensive in the years immediately following the war. Fifty years after the opening of the gallery, the BJU collection included more than 400 European paintings from the 14th to the 19th centuries (mostly pre-19th century), period furniture, a notable collection of Russian icons, and a hodge-podge of Holy Land antiquities. The Bob Jones University Museum & Gallery is strong in Baroque paintings and includes works by Rubens, Tintoretto, Veronese, Cranach, Gerard David, Murillo, Mattia Preti, Ribera, van Dyck and Doré. The museum is the largest collection of religious art in the Western Hemisphere and remained Jones' hobby for the remainder of his life.

== Personal life ==
Jones could be a demanding superior with strong, hyperbolically expressed, views about matters political and religious. But he also could display a childlike humility, especially on his many visits to foreign missionaries. Intimates found him witty and even impish. Although Jones enjoyed playing villains in Shakespeare plays and religious films—he founded the BJU cinema department in 1950—he genuinely enjoyed a life of ideas and the fine arts. A curator at the North Carolina Museum of Art was genuinely surprised when Jones failed to reflect his preconception as "a kind of backwoods evangelical" who would "thump the Bible" at him. "There was a gentleness and a kinship there," he recalled. "And even if he knew you thought differently than he did, that was OK; you could still be his friend."

In 1938, he married Fannie May Holmes. They had three children, including Bob Jones III, who succeeded him as president of BJU. Bob Jones Jr. published two religious novels, several books of sermons, and an autobiography.

Jones died of cancer in 1997 at the age of 86; he is buried near his parents on the campus of Bob Jones University.

== Religious and political views ==
- "Pope Paul VI, archpriest of Satan, a deceiver and an anti-Christ, has, like Judas, gone to his own place....[A] pope must be an opportunist, a tyrant, a hypocrite, and a deceiver or he cannot be a pope....A pope claims to be Christ's vice-regent on earth; that is, he blasphemously and arrogantly claims to have the divine prerogatives to forgive sins, to assign his enemies to hell...and to speak on matters of faith and morals with the same infallibility as the Holy Bible." (1978)
- "I have grown sick and tired of the 'Praise God' sanctimoniously sighed and the 'Bless the Lord' blasphemously belched forth by the phonies and hypocrites, the deceivers and the deceived who appear on television like 'The 700 Club' and the 'PTL Club.'...I think the charismatic movement may be more dangerous than all of the other false religions and the cults which we face today." (1985)
- "I have never known it to fail that when five-point Calvinism becomes the chief end of a man's ministry and the most important thing in his preaching, that man becomes cold, dead, egotistical, and a liar."
- "I am inclined to blame every evil on Romanism. Although I dislike everything about the harlot church, the so-called 'Society of Jesus' is the most vicious creation of that religion of darkness and dead bones."
- On the Kent State shootings (1970): "Any students who attack lawfully constituted authority in such a situation should be shot if necessary, and they should expect to be shot. A campus riot is not different from any other riot."
- "Half of the government departments should be abolished and the rest trimmed to the bone. No senior bureaucrat should be able to retain office longer than eight or ten years, no matter what party is in power, and after twenty years, the people in inferior positions should be retired if they have lasted that long. All Supreme Court justices should be appointed for a limited term of not more than ten years."
- On Billy Graham (1985): "For a long time I believed that Billy was doing more harm than any other living man. What a tragedy to see him building the church of Antichrist, masking the wickedness of popery, and providing a sheep's cloak of Christian recognition for the wolves of apostasy."
- "Religiously, I think perhaps the silliest idea abroad—and one which is calculated to divide the people of God—is the idea that there is some sort of special inspiration attached to the...King James Version....Moreover, it is a heresy because it implies that God did not completely inspire the original manuscripts and therefore in 1611 He had to add inspiration."
- "I knew, as a boy, some devout and earnest black preachers of the Word of God. There were many. Today I know of very few and am personally acquainted with only two or three black preachers in this country who emphasize the Scripture, stress the necessity of the new birth, and are in any degree biblical in their convictions or their preaching. It is small wonder then that we are seeing a whole new generation of blacks come up in America who have little moral conviction." (1985)
- "I have no brief for Oral Roberts, whom I regard as one of the biggest religious phonies in America today."
- "In not seeking public approval or attempting to 'build a following,' no doubt I have sometimes not been careful enough about trying to be tactful, discreet, and wise in dealing with the public. I certainly have never tried to avoid meeting an issue head-on, and I have always been honest and frank in my public statements. This may not be the most politic course of action, but then I have never had a politician's ambition."
- After preaching in Port-au-Prince, Haiti, Jones was bearded by a "big, burly Dutch missionary" who said, "I hear at Bob Jones University you do not like black people. I hear your rules are too strict and that there is no love there." Jones interrupted, "I hear that Dutch Calvinists are rude and disagreeable, insulting, and thoroughly abrasive; that their lives are carnal; and that they have no conscience against drinking and smoking and little concern for the winning of souls." When the missionary was sufficiently taken aback, Jones added that he did not necessarily believe everything he heard.

== Writings ==
- As the Small Rain, (Zondervan, 1945) sermon collection
- Cornbread and Caviar: Reminiscences and Reflections, (BJU Press, 1985)
- Daniel of Babylon: A Novel, (BJU Press, 1984)
- How to Improve Your Preaching, (BJU Press, 1960)
- Rhyme & Reason, (BJU Press, 1981) an anthology of inspirational verse
- Showers Upon the Grass, (Zondervan, 1951) sermon collection
- Wine of Morning: A Novel of the First Century (1950) reprint, BJU Press, 1976

Academic offices
Preceded by Bob Jones Sr.	President of Bob Jones University; 1947–1971	Succeeded by Bob Jones III
