= Bob Jones Sr. =

American evangelist and broadcaster (1883–1968)

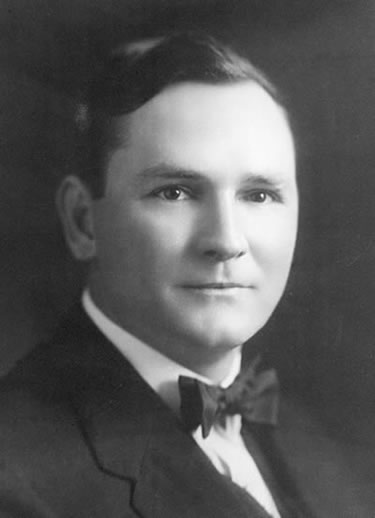
- Born: Robert Davis Reynolds Jones; October 30, 1883; Skipperville, Alabama
- Died: January 16, 1968 (aged 84); Greenville, South Carolina
- Resting place: Bob Jones University
- Occupations: Evangelist; University administrator
- Spouses: Bernice Sheffield (m. 1905; died 1906): Mary Gaston Stollenwerck
- Children: Bob Jones Jr.
- Parent(s): William Alexander Jones; Georgia Ann Creel Jones
- Relatives: Bob Jones III (grandson)

1st President of Bob Jones University
- In office 1927–1947
- Succeeded by: Bob Jones Jr.

Robert Reynolds Jones Sr. (October 30, 1883 – January 16, 1968) was an American evangelist, pioneer religious broadcaster, and the founder and first president of Bob Jones University.

== Early years ==
Bob Davis Reynolds Jones was the eleventh of twelve children born to William Alexander and Georgia Creel Jones. In 1883, when Bob was born, Alex Jones, a Confederate veteran, was working a small farm in Dale County, Alabama, but within months the family moved to Brannon Stand west of Dothan. All the unmarried Jones children helped work the farm there, and Bob Jones often sold the family vegetables door-to-door in Dothan. Jones later recalled, "We may have been a little undernourished, but we built some character."

Jones's elementary schooling was limited by modern standards, but the boy early exhibited a quick mind and oratorical ability. Alex Jones had Bob memorize passages from the Bible and from literature, and Bob, who was "timid and self-conscious," was regularly called on to perform for guests. Jones later recalled, "I did whatever my father said to do, but when he told me to 'say the speech,' I suffered agony that nobody could possibly know."

Jones must have quickly overcome his stage fright, however, for by 1895, as a twelve-year-old, he gave a spirited, twenty-minute defense of the Populist Party while standing on a dry-goods box in front of a Dothan drug store. His gifts were recognized by Dr. Charles Jefferson Hammitt (1858–1935), a Methodist missionary from Philadelphia and former president of Mallalieu Seminary (1882–1923), a Methodist secondary school in Kinsey. Jones boarded with the Hammitts and helped pay his board by serving the household, even taking orders from the Hammitt children. Jones graduated from Mallalieu in 1900, and the following year he entered Southern University (later Birmingham-Southern College) at Greensboro, Alabama, supporting himself with his preaching. He attended until 1904 but by then was already so prominent as an evangelist that he left without taking a degree, in part to help support two widowed sisters.

By the time Jones was 17, both his father and mother were dead. In 1905, Jones married Bernice Sheffield, who died of tuberculosis within ten months of their marriage. On June 17, 1908, he married Mary Gaston Stollenwerck, whom he had met as a choir member during a meeting he was conducting in Uniontown, Alabama. Their only child, Bob Jones Jr., was born October 19, 1911, in Montgomery, where they made their home. Mary Gaston Jones died on May 12, 1989, in her 101st year—83 years after the death of her husband's first wife.

== Evangelistic career ==
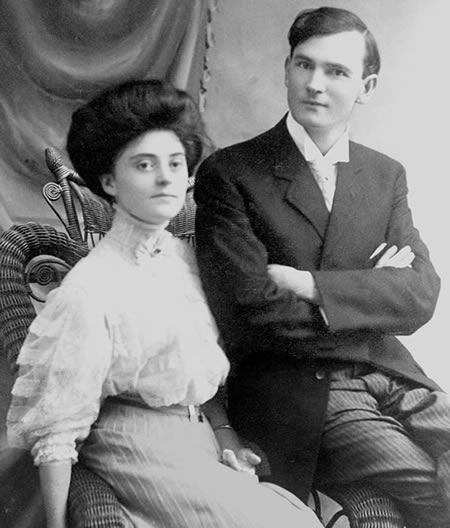
Bob Jones and his bride, Mary Gaston Stollenwerck Jones, June 1908

Jones's family was devoutly Christian—his mother a Primitive Baptist and his father an "immersed" Methodist. The family attended a nearby Methodist church where Bob Jones was converted at age 11. But as a portent of Jones's later non-denominationalism, he too was baptized by immersion before joining the Methodists.

At age 12, Jones was made Sunday School superintendent, and he held his first revival meeting at his home church—seeing sixty conversions in a single week. At thirteen, he built a "brush arbor" shelter and organized his own congregation of 54 members. By age 15, Jones was a licensed circuit preacher for the Alabama Methodist Conference. A year later, he was called to the Headland Circuit of five churches, including the one he had started, and he was earning $25 a month (worth $968 today) for his labors. Jones later wondered that "the devil did not trap me....I was pulled here and there and from house to house. People flocked to hear me preach. The buildings could not hold the crowds; people even stood outside and stuck their heads in the windows to listen. It's a wonder it did not spoil me."

American evangelistic meetings received more newspaper publicity at the turn of the twentieth century than before or since and were often boosted by the town fathers out of civic pride. Bob Jones meetings were frequently front-page news for weeks in the cities where he held meetings. By the 1920s, Jones was one of the best-known evangelists in the United States. His campaign results were remarkable even for the era. For instance, in a seven-week campaign in Zanesville, Ohio (1917), a town of 22,000, there were 3,384 converts, of whom 2,200 joined churches on Easter Sunday. In 1921, Muskingum College, a Presbyterian school, became the first of several institutions to confer honorary doctorates on Jones.

By the time he was 40, Jones had preached to more than fifteen million people face-to-face and without amplification, and he was credited with tens of thousands of conversions. (Unlike Billy Sunday, Jones was reluctant to keep tabulated records of his results.) Crowds might be as large as 15,000 at a time, virtually necessitating the sustained volume, hyperbolic language, and extravagant gestures that became stereotypical characteristics of period evangelists. (In Zanesville, a reporter noted that Jones "pounded the altar so hard he broke it.")

== Bob Jones University ==
During the Fundamentalist-Modernist controversy of the 1920s, Jones grew increasingly concerned with the secularization of higher education. Children of church members were attending college, only to reject the faith of their parents. Jones later recalled that in 1924, his friend William Jennings Bryan had leaned over to him at a Bible conference service in Winona Lake, Indiana, and said, "If schools and colleges do not quit teaching evolution as a fact, we are going to become a nation of atheists."

In the fall of 1925—shortly after the Scopes Trial—Jones and his wife were driving in south Florida talking about the need for an orthodox Christian college as an alternative to what he perceived to be loss of both state and denominational colleges to secularism. After stopping for some sandwiches, Jones announced, "just as a clap of thunder out of a clear sky," that he was going to found such a school. His wife's first response was, "Robert, are you crazy?" Jones immediately turned the car north and began consulting with friends in Alabama and north Florida about a location.

On April 14, 1926, a charter was approved by the circuit court in Panama City, Florida, and Jones promoted real estate sales to raise money for the college. On December 1, 1926, ground was broken on St. Andrews Bay near Lynn Haven, Florida, and the college opened on September 12, 1927, with 88 students. Jones said that although he was averse to naming the school after himself his friends overcame his reluctance "with the argument that the school would be called by that name because of my connection with it, and to attempt to give it any other name would confuse the people."

Bob Jones took no salary from the college, and in fact, for years afterward, he helped support the school through personal savings and income from his evangelistic campaigns. Both time and place were inauspicious. The Florida land boom had peaked in 1925, and a hurricane in September 1926 further reduced land values. The Great Depression followed hard on its heels. Bob Jones College barely survived bankruptcy and its move to Cleveland, Tennessee, in 1933. Nevertheless, the reputation of both the school and its founder continued to grow, and with the enactment of GI Bill at the end of World War II, the college was virtually forced to seek a new location and build a new campus. In 1947, the school moved to Greenville, South Carolina, where it was renamed Bob Jones University.

By that time, oversight of day-to-day operations had long since passed to his son, Bob Jones Jr. Nevertheless, the elder Jones continued to raise money, preach regularly at chapel services, and provide inspiration to the hundreds of ministerial students who flooded the campus during the 1950s and revered him as "Doctor Bob." Gradually, during the early '60s, he began to suffer "hardening of the arteries," resigned as chairman of the board in 1964, and was forced to retire to the university infirmary in 1966. Despite mental confusion, his prayers were said to have remained bell-clear virtually to the end.

== Radio broadcasts ==
New mass entertainment, such as radio and movies, helped put an end to an era of citywide evangelism typified by the ministries of Bob Jones and Billy Sunday. But Jones was not afraid of technological progress per se and believed that the new media might provide additional opportunities to spread the gospel. During the early 1920s Jones was one of the first religious figures to broadcast on radio. The 1925 Bob Jones evangelistic meetings in Pittsburgh were perhaps the first remote-controlled religious broadcasts in the world, as well as the first broadcasts to originate from an evangelistic crusade. (In the same year, Jones also made a religious film, which because of its graphic—for the era—portrayal of certain sins, was slashed into an "unrecognizable mess" by the Pennsylvania State Censorship Board.)

In 1927, the year that network radio was launched in the United States, Jones began both a daily and weekly network program heard from New York to Alabama; and despite his other responsibilities, he maintained an uninterrupted radio ministry for 35 years until his health failed in 1962. In 1944, Jones became a founder of National Religious Broadcasters and served as a director.

Jones understood that the manner of delivery necessary to declaim to thousands unamplified was unsuited to the new medium, and his radio sermons were instead delivered in an intimate, folksy manner. Perhaps three thousand of his approximately ten thousand radio messages survive, and recordings are still nationally syndicated.

== Religious views ==
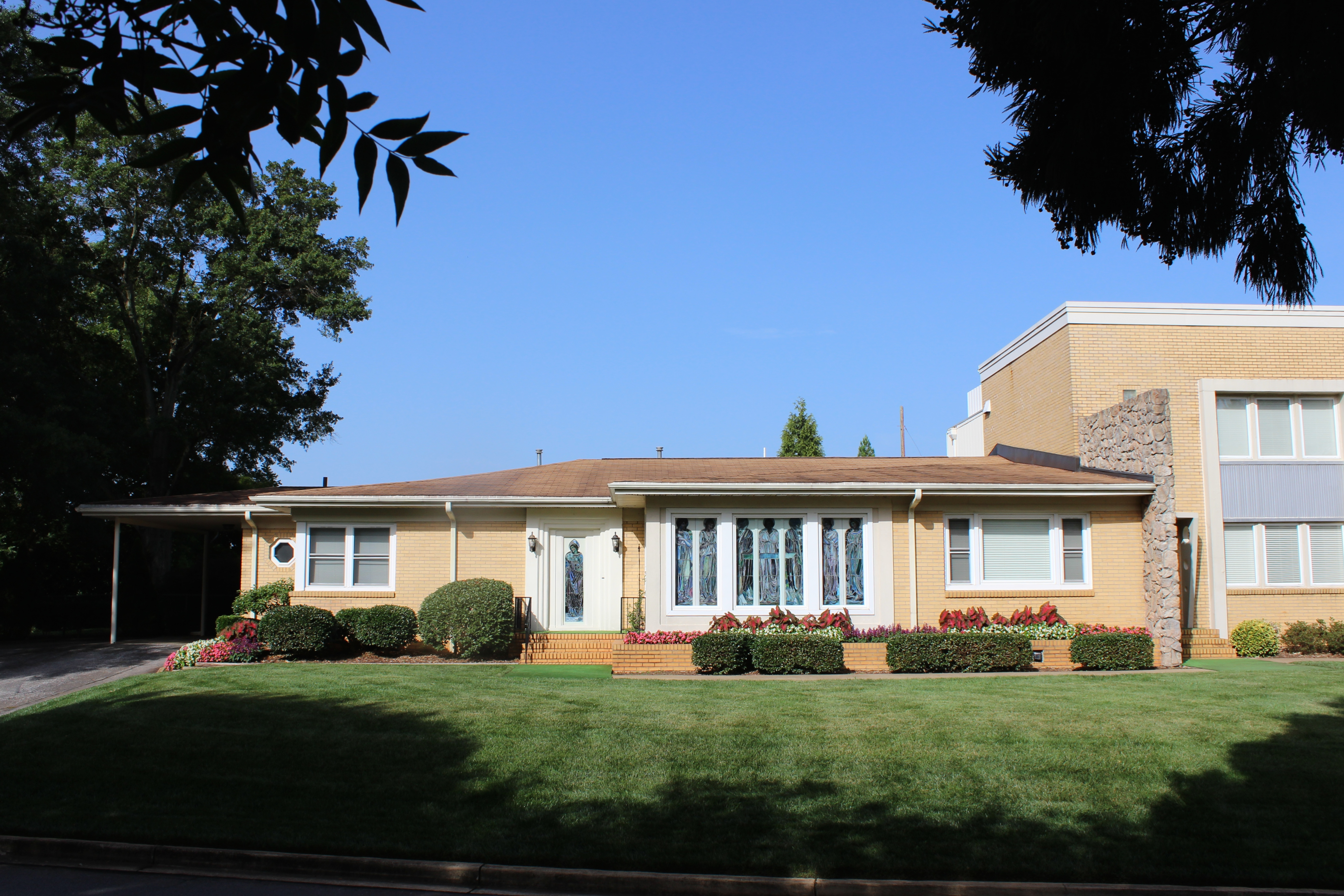
Home of Bob Jones Sr. from 1948 until his final illness. The two-bedroom house was joined to the larger official residence of the BJU president (at the time Bob JonesJr.) to the right of the photo. The exterior has been little altered since Jones's death.

Theologically, Jones was a Protestant in the Reformation tradition. One of his first concerns when he founded Bob Jones College was to provide a creed that would embody the fundamentals of the Christian faith. The Bob Jones University creed (composed by journalist and prohibitionist Sam Small) was an abbreviated statement of traditional orthodoxy, emphasizing those aspects of the faith that were under attack during the early twentieth century. Therefore, the BJC creed affirmed the inspiration of the Bible and rejected the theory of human evolution as necessary tenets of Christian belief.

Perhaps because of the tension between his mother's Primitive Baptist views and his own long-standing membership in the Methodist Church, Jones sought to split the difference between Calvinism and Arminianism. He urged his hearers to believe that “whatever the Bible says is so,” even if its words did not fit a particular theological system. Although Jones believed that man was depraved by nature and that salvation was through Christ and by grace alone, his early revival sermons stressed opposition to social sins such as drinking, dancing, and Sabbath desecration and the possibility that they might be ameliorated by legislation as well as by individual repentance.

Jones's view of academic learning was also practical; he advocated Christian higher education yet insisted that faith could not rest on human argument. Jones was skeptical of both the intellectual emphasis of the Reformed tradition and the pietism of the "deeper life" movement. He could quote Goethe and Cicero without affectation, but he urged his students to make “truth simple and easy to grasp”—to put “the fodder on the ground” and give “all the animals from a giraffe to a billy-goat” an equal chance to understand the gospel.

In the 1950s, Jones played an important, if unwelcome, role in the division of orthodox Protestantism into fundamentalism and neo-evangelicalism. The severance, which had already been bruited about in some conservative seminaries, became actual with the rise to prominence of evangelist Billy Graham. Graham had briefly attended Bob Jones College, and the university had conferred an honorary degree on him in 1948. In the 1940s Jones and Graham seemed to have developed something of a father-son relationship. During the 1950s, however, Graham began distancing himself from the older fundamentalism, and in 1957, he sought broad ecumenical sponsorship for his New York Crusade. Jones argued that because members of Graham's campaign executive committee had rejected major tenets of orthodox Christianity, such as the virgin birth and the deity of Christ, Graham had therefore violated 2 John 9–11, which prohibits receiving in fellowship those who do “not abide in the teaching of Christ.” Members of Graham's organization accused Jones of jealousy because Graham was now attracting larger crowds than any who had ever heard Jones. Jones wrote that he was an old man who did not want to “get into a battle” but that he would not go “back on the Lord Jesus Christ.” The notoriety of the Graham-Jones split marked a more-or-less permanent division among Bible-believers into smaller fundamentalist and larger evangelical factions.

== Political and social views ==
Jones enjoyed politics, was the friend of many politicians, and had been encouraged to run for office a number of times. During the 1928 presidential election, Jones campaigned throughout the South for Republican Herbert Hoover against Democrat Al Smith. Smith, he claimed, would be unduly influenced by the Pope, who Jones said was to Catholics "the voice of God." Jones said he "would rather see a saloon on every corner than a Catholic in the White House." Jones's support for Hoover, though quixotic in 1928, was perhaps the earliest harbinger of the demise of the Solid South.

In the late 1920s, Jones, like Billy Sunday (who was an Iowan), accepted contributions for his evangelistic campaigns from the Ku Klux Klan. Jones also supported members of the Klan, notably his friend, Alabama Governor Bibb Graves, for political office. Although Jones rejected lawlessness and lynching, he sympathized with the Klan's professed endorsement of religious orthodoxy, Prohibition, and opposition to the teaching of evolution as fact. Racial segregation per se was hardly an issue among whites in 1920s Alabama because at the time both supporters and a majority of white opponents of the Klan were segregationists.

Nevertheless, Jones remained a segregationist into the era of the Civil Rights Movement, when he was in his 70s. There are few references to race in Jones's sermons and chapel messages until the late 1950s, but in a 1960 radio address, Jones declared that God had been the author of segregation and that opposition to segregation was opposition to God. Jones's health began to fail before the integration of neighboring Furman University in 1965, and he did not live to see the abandonment of segregation, six years later, at Bob Jones University.

== Writings ==
- Bob Jones' Sermons
- On Here and Hereafter
- "My Friends" (radio messages based on Jones's chapel sayings)
- Things I Have Learned: Chapel Talks by Bob Jones Sr. (1945)
- Is Segregation Scriptural? (1960)

== Sources ==
- R. K. Johnson, Builder of Bridges: The Biography of Dr Bob Jones Sr (Sword of the Lord Publishers, 1969).
- Daniel L. Turner, Standing Without Apology: The History of Bob Jones University (Bob Jones University Press, 1997)]
- Melton Wright, Fortress of Faith: The Story of Bob Jones University (Bob Jones University Press, 1984)
