= List of Independent Baptist higher education institutions in the United States =

This list of Independent Baptist higher education institutions consists of institutions of higher education that are Independent Baptist in the United States, all of which appear to use KJV.

== Current schools ==
- Arlington Baptist University (Arlington, Texas)
- Ambassador Baptist College (Lattimore, North Carolina)
- Asheville Baptist Institute (online only)
- Baptist College of America (Kokomo, Indiana)
- Baptist College of Ministry (Menomonee Falls, Wisconsin)
- Biblical School of World Evangelism (Milford, Ohio)
- Boston Baptist College (Boston, Massachusetts)
- California Baptist University (Riverside, California)
- Calvary Baptist Bible College (King, North Carolina)
- Carolina University (formerly Piedmont International University; Winston-Salem, North Carolina)
- Chesapeake Baptist College (Severn, Maryland)
- Commonwealth Baptist College (Lexington, Kentucky)
- Crown College of the Bible (Powell, Tennessee)
- Detroit Baptist Theological Seminary (Allen Park, Michigan)
- Fairhaven Baptist College (Chesterton, Indiana)
- Faith Baptist Bible College and Theological Seminary (Ankeny, Iowa)
- First Bible School of Translation (Milfor, Ohio)
- Golden State Baptist College (Santa Clara, California)
- Heartland Baptist Bible College (Oklahoma City, Oklahoma)
- Huntsville Bible College (Huntsville, Alabama)
- Hyles–Anderson College (Crown Point, Indiana)
- Independent Baptist Seminary (Dover, Delaware)
- Landmark Baptist College (Haines City, Florida)
- Louisiana Baptist University (Shreveport, Louisiana)
- Macedonia Baptist College (Midland, North Carolina)
- Maranatha Baptist University (Watertown, Wisconsin)
- Midwestern Baptist College (Pontiac, Michigan)
- Mission University (Springfield, Missouri)
- New England Baptist College (Southington, CT)
- Patriot Bible University ( Del Norte, Colorado)
- Pensacola Christian College (Pensacola, Florida)
- Practical Bible Baptist College (James City, North Carolina)
- Providence Baptist College (Elgin, Illinois)
- Temple Baptist Seminary (Winston-Salem, North Carolina)
- Trinity College of Jacksonville (Jacksonville, Florida)
- Vision Baptist College (Berlin, New Jersey)
- West Coast Baptist College (Lancaster, California)

== Former schools ==
- Baptist University of America (1971–1987)
- Pillsbury Baptist Bible College (Owatonna, Minnesota; 1957–2008)
- Tennessee Temple University (Chattanooga, Tennessee; 1946–2015)

== See also ==
- Bob Jones University
