= Michael S. Heiser =

American biblical scholar (1963–2023)

Michael Steven Heiser (February 14, 1963 – February 20, 2023) was an American Old Testament scholar and Christian author with training in ancient history, Semitic languages, and the Hebrew Bible from the University of Pennsylvania and the University of Wisconsin-Madison. His expertise and work focused on the nature of the spiritual realm in the Bible and about spiritual matters more generally. He wrote more than ten books on these subjects since 2010.

He served as executive director of the School of Ministry at Celebration Church in Jacksonville, Florida, and previously as scholar-in-residence at Faithlife Corporation. He ran The Naked Bible podcast and Miqlat, a ministry to disseminate his scholarship. He also hosted the Peeranormal Podcast until 2021 which discussed peer-reviewed research on the paranormal. He had additionally been active in media productions around his area of interest, and in response to popular presentations relating to spiritual matters (such as material in the television series Stranger Things, and in rebutting ancient astronaut conjectures).

Heiser died from pancreatic cancer on February 20, 2023.

== Early life and education ==
Heiser was born on February 14, 1963, and raised in Lebanon, Pennsylvania. He was one of seven children.

He received an MA in Ancient History from the University of Pennsylvania, and an MA and PhD in the Hebrew Bible and Semitic Languages from the University of Wisconsin-Madison (with a minor in Classical studies).

== Research interests ==
Much of Heiser's work focused on the Biblical and Old Testament view of the "Unseen Realm": a supernatural world, distinct from the physical realm, inhabited by hierarchical order of spiritual beings, like angels, demons, and a divine council.

Kevin Bauder of the Central Baptist Theological Seminary of Minneapolis called Heiser the "most prominent evangelical defender" of the divine council interpretation of Psalm 82, and said that Heiser "has become a[n]... evangelist for the divine council theory, giving it wide exposure in popular books and articles, and defending it" through his blogging and other internet activities.

=== Criticism of ancient astronaut arguments ===
Heiser spoke out critically against proponents of pseudoscientific ancient astronaut conjectures, especially as popularized by Zechariah Sitchin. Heiser appeared in Ancient Aliens Debunked as an expert on the Hebrew Bible and Ancient Near Eastern texts.

== Career ==
Beginning in 2015, Heiser published at least ten books regarding the meaning of various biblical concepts, and on other topics related to popular understandings of spirituality; in addition, he produced two works of fiction, in the early 2010s. Until 2019, Heiser was scholar-in-residence at Faithlife Corporation.

He was Executive Director of the School of Ministry at Celebration Church in Jacksonville, Florida, and a distance-learning professor at Liberty University and Midwestern Baptist Theological Seminary. He also produced a podcast (The Naked Bible), and created a ministry called Miqlat, dedicated to the production and dissemination of his content.

Heiser appeared in the 2018 documentary film Fragments of Truth, and in the 2019 documentary film The Unseen Realm. In 2019 he released the book The World Turned Upside Down: Finding the Gospel in Stranger Things, referencing the Netflix series Stranger Things as analogies to Christian theology.

== Personal life and death ==
Heiser was married to Drenna, and had three daughters and a son.

In 2021, Heiser was diagnosed with pancreatic cancer. On January 4, 2023, his wife Drenna, posting on his Instagram page with an accompanying picture of the hospitalized Heiser, noted that he had been admitted for severe anemia, that physicians had stabilized him and were seeking to determine a source of blood loss. On January 22, he announced on his Facebook page that he was "at the end of the road in the late stage (4) of a very aggressive pancreatic cancer". Heiser died on February 20, a week after his 60th birthday.

== Selected works ==
- Heiser, Michael S. (2012). The Facade: Book 1 of the Facade Saga. Kirkdale Press. ISBN 978-1577995685.
- ——— (2014). The Portent: Book 2 of the Facade Saga. Kirkdale Press. ISBN 978-1577995616.
- ——— (2015). I Dare You Not to Bore Me with The Bible. Bellingham, WA: Lexham Press. ISBN 978-1577995395.
- ——— (2015). The Unseen Realm: Recovering the Supernatural Worldview of the Bible. Bellingham, WA: Lexham Press. ISBN 978-1-577-99556-2.
- ——— (2015). Supernatural: What the Bible Teaches About the Unseen World - and Why It Matters. Bellingham, WA: Lexham Press. ISBN 978-1577995586.
- ——— (2017). Reversing Hermon: Enoch, the Watchers, and the Forgotten Mission of Jesus Christ. Crane, MO: Defender Publishing. ISBN 978-0-998-14263-0.
- ——— (2017). The Bible Unfiltered: Approaching Scripture on Its Own Terms. Bellingham, WA: Lexham Press. ISBN 978-1-683-59040-8.
- ——— (2018). Angels: What the Bible Really Says About God's Heavenly Host. Bellingham, WA: Lexham Press. ISBN 978-1-683-59104-7.
- ——— (2019). A Companion to the Book of Enoch: A Reader's commentary, Vol. I: The Book of the Watchers (1 Enoch 1-36). Crane, MO: Defender Publishing. ISBN 978-1-948-01430-4.
- ——— (2019). The World Turned Upside Down: Finding the Gospel in Stranger Things. Bellingham, WA: Lexham Press. ISBN 978-1-683-59322-5.
- ——— (2020). Demons: What the Bible really says about the powers of darkness. Bellingham, WA: Lexham Press. ISBN 978-1 683-59290-7.
- ——— (2021). A Companion to the Book of Enoch: a reader's commentary, Vol. II: The Parables of Enoch (1 Enoch 37-71). Crane, MO: Defender Publishing. ISBN 978-1-948-01441-0.
