= Southwide Baptist Fellowship =

Baptist Christian Denomination in United States

The Southwide Baptist Fellowship is an Independent Baptist Christian denomination in United States. It is a member of the International Baptist Network.

== Organisation ==
The organizational structure of government and by-laws within the Southwide Baptist Fellowship are not available for public viewing, but the organization includes a moderator and one of its main purposes is to convene regularly for conferences.

== Beliefs ==
Considered a conservative and "Fundamentalist" association of Baptist churches, the Southwide Baptist Fellowship is not as staunchly devoted as other Baptist Fundamentalist Fellowships to the concept of absolute autonomy (local church independence) or the essential requirement of the King James Version (KJV). Certainly, most member churches of the Southwide Baptist Fellowship are Independent Baptist and remain "KJV-only".

When it originated, the Southwide Baptist Fellowship was almost identical in teaching and outlook as the core of Independent Baptist Fundamentalism. It was heavily influenced by Lee Roberson and John R. Rice. Its hallmark code of behaviors (short hair on men, dresses on women, no mixed bathing, no movies, no contemporary music) and its theology of Dispensationalism were standard for Baptist Fundamentalism. Many of its members were openly antagonistic towards the Southern Baptist Convention and were outposken critics of SBC policies which, two decades ago, permitted a certain degree of liberal theology.

=== Increasing openness ===
Over time, particularly since the 1990s, the Southwide Baptist Fellowship has loosened some of its more strict requirements of dress and behavior.

Currently, it remains a loose federation of Baptist churches that stand for conservatism, both religious and political, including political action, and overall it remains Dispensational in theology. It embraces but does not require strict independence.

== Splinter Organizations ==
Once Southwide began to open up to more Southern Baptists and Contemporary Christian influences, the more conservative, KJV Only sections began forming separate fellowships such as the Nationwide Independent Baptist Fellowship, now known as the Atlanta Super Conference, and more recently the new Southwide Independent Baptist Fellowship. Both of these groups have been influenced by leaders from independent Baptist institutions such as Crown College (Tennessee), West Coast Baptist College and Hyles-Anderson College.
