= Bimi =

Bimi or BIMI may refer to

- Bimi-ye Sofla, a village in Iran
- Baptist International Missions, Inc. (BIMI)
- Bimi Ombale (1952–2011), Congolese singer, drummer and songwriter
- Larry Bimi (died 2011), Ghanaian lawyer and public official
- Brand Indicators for Message Identification (BIMI)
- A registered trade mark under which sprouting broccoli produce also referred to as Broccolini is sold
