= Bauder =

Bauder is a surname. Notable people with the surname include:

- Christopher Bauder (born 1973), German interaction designer and media artist
- Emma Pow Bauder (1848–1932), American evangelist and author
- Eugen Bauder (born 1986), German model and actor
- James Bauder (born 1969/1970), Canadian truck driver and protest organizer
- Kevin T. Bauder, American Baptist theologian
- Matt Bauder (born 1976), American jazz saxophonist, clarinetist and composer
