= Carroll Christian Schools =

Private school in Westminster, Maryland, United States

Location
- 550 Baltimore Blvd. Westminster, (Carroll County), Maryland 21157; United States; 39°34′1″N 76°58′38″W

Information
- Type: Private
- Motto: Strength - Integrity - Honesty
- Religious affiliation: Independent Baptist
- Established: 1973
- Administrator: Todd Comstock
- Grades: PreK-12
- Colors: red, blue, white
- Athletics: Boys soccer, girls volleyball, boys basketball, girls basketball, boys baseball, girls soccer
- Team name: Patriots
- Yearbook: The Patriot
- Website: http://www.carrollchristian.com

Carroll Christian Schools is a private Christian school in Westminster, Maryland. The school began as Carroll Christian Academy in 1973 in conjunction with the Church of the Open Door. The school slowly grew and added grades throughout the 1970s until its first high school graduation in 1982. Aletha Carlson was the first principal of the school.

== Facilities ==
In addition to the original sanctuary (the cornerstone reads 1967), numerous buildings have been added. The original sanctuary is the Baker building, named after the founding pastor of the church, Reverend Ernest Baker. A major addition was completed in the early 1970s along the west side of the original structure. This addition contained classrooms and office space and is now known as the Bose building, named after the second pastor of the church, Reverend Homer Bose.

Two small duplex style classroom buildings were constructed in the late 1970s. During the tenure of Dr. Shelton Smith from 1979 to 1995, small portions of land were acquired from an adjoining commercial nursery and a gym/high school building was eventually constructed in the mid-1990s. When Dr. Smith left the church to become editor of The Sword of the Lord, the gym/high school building was named in his honor.

Shortly thereafter, the church was able to acquire much of the undeveloped land in the immediate area. Portions of the property were then utilized (i.e. ballfields, parking, storage, etc.) to support both the church and school. Several years later a sizable addition to the high school (nearly doubling its size) was added. The campus is now large enough to accommodate future growth of the church and the school if need be.

== Athletics ==
The Carroll Christian Patriots compete in four different sports that include soccer, basketball, baseball, and volleyball.

The school's volleyball and soccer teams compete in the National Association of Christian Athletes (NACA) under their Division II competition. The Patriots volleyball team won the NACA National Championship in 2009 and were State Champions in 2008.

The athletic department is also a member in the Maryland Association of Christian Schools Athletic Conference (MACSAC) in which the school competes against 11 other Christian schools. The Boys Varsity Soccer team won the MACSAC Championships for the 1995–96, 1996–97, 2008–09 academic years. The Boys Varsity Basketball team won three MACSAC Championships in a row from 1996 to 1998. In Baseball, the Boys Varsity won Championships in 1998 and 2000. The Girls Varsity team won 10 championships in Volleyball, eight championships in basketball, one championship in softball, and two championships in soccer.
