= Heavenly Presentation of Christ's Blood =

Soteriological doctrine within Christian Fundamentalism

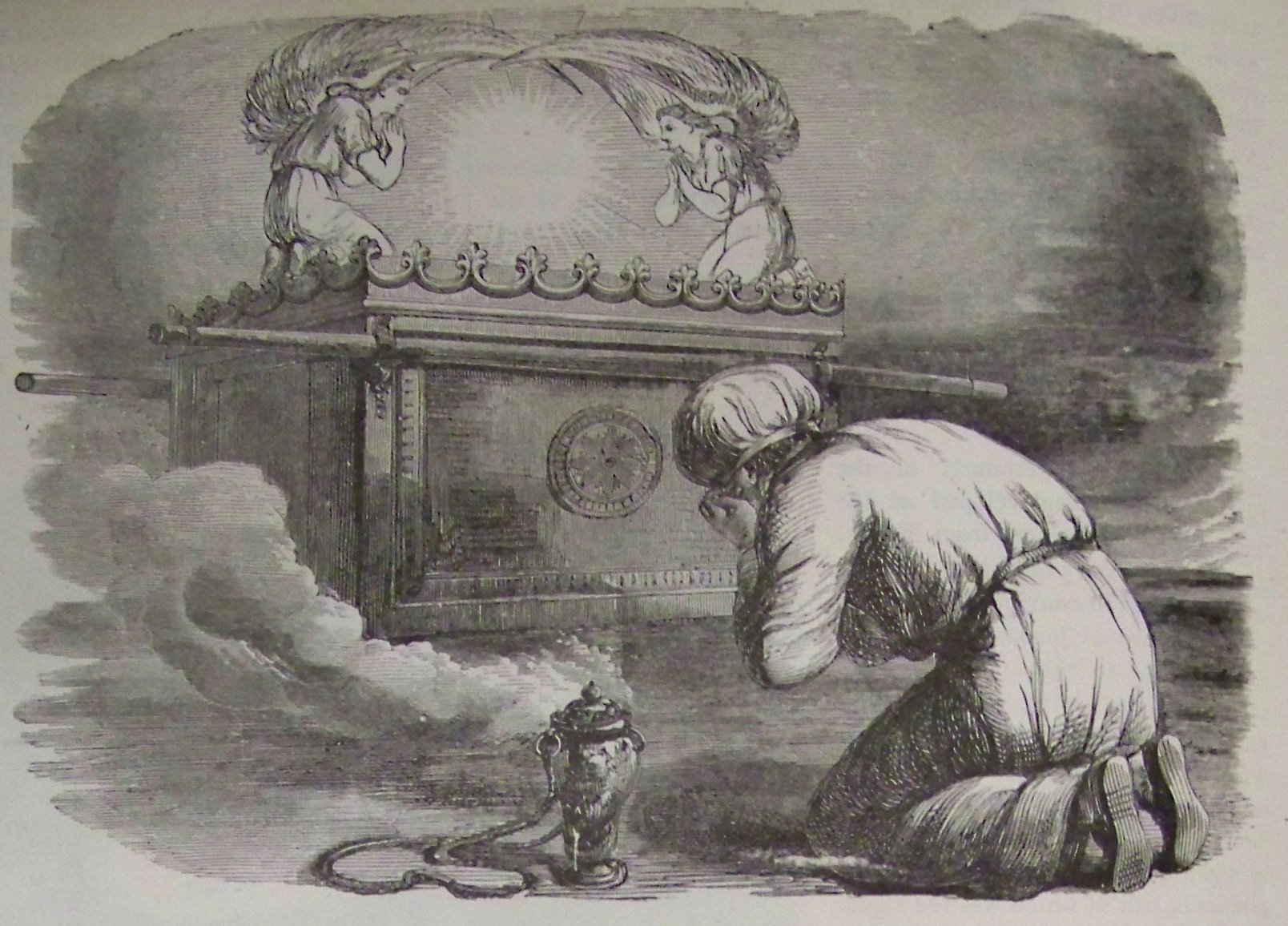
The Mercy Seat, illustration from the 1890 Holman Bible

The Heavenly Presentation of Christ's Blood is a doctrine taught by some Christian Fundamentalists that after Jesus' resurrection, he took his blood into heaven and sprinkled it into a heavenly mercy seat as a part of his priestly work.

This view has caused controversy among Conservative Christians, as critics have argued that that it creates a magical view of the blood of Christ, while others have argued that a denial of Jesus' blood being presented to heaven diminishes of the role of the blood of Christ and thus also the atoning work of Jesus.

== History ==
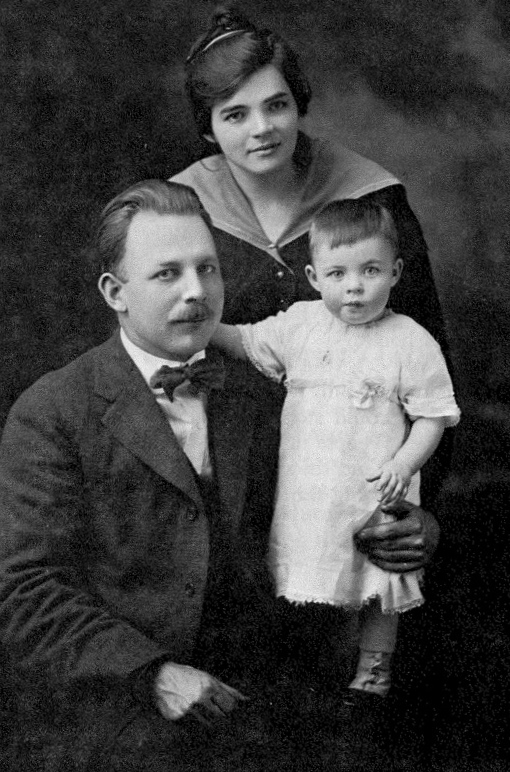
M.R. DeHaan, young physician with family, c. 1917

The belief that Jesus carried his literal blood into a heavenly mercy seat has long been a point of debate within Conservative Christianity. Among the earliest proponents of this view was the German theologian Johann Albrecht Bengel (1687–1752), who argued that Jesus took his literal blood to heaven, where it is eternally preserved. Although in contrast, Frederick Grant (1834–1902), in his Numerical Bible, argued against this idea, maintaining that Jesus did not take his blood to heaven. The doctrine gained broader attention through Martin DeHaan (1891–1965), who, in his book The Chemistry of the Blood, speculated that a golden chalice in heaven might hold every drop of Christ's blood. R. L. Hymers Jr has further suggested that this perspective was held by the renowned English hymn writer Isaac Watts (1674–1748).

The issue concerning Jesus' blood being taken to heaven also caused a local controversy among the faculty of Dallas Theological Seminary, as Robert Thieme (1918 – 2009) strongly criticized the view that Jesus took his blood to heaven as a part of his atoning work. Thieme himself argued that this idea was a perpetuating of mysticism from the Dark Ages. Thieme's views were however accused of "heresy" by the Baptist writer Robert Walter, who borrowed from the statements of Oliver B. Green (1915 – 1976) on the blood of Christ being presented to heaven. Thieme's view that Jesus did not take his blood to heaven was also held by the then president of the seminary, John F. Walvoord (1910 – 2002). However, he also rejected the view of Thieme that Jesus' bleeding was not a part of the atonement.

More recently, Evangelical Pastor John MacArthur has rejected this doctrine.

== Doctrine ==
According to the doctrine that Jesus carried his blood into heaven, this act was an essential component of His redemptive work for humanity. Proponents of this view often interpret John 20:17—where Jesus tells Mary Magdalene not to touch him—as indicating that he had not yet completed the task of sprinkling his blood on the heavenly mercy seat. Based on this interpretation, figures such as Jack Hyles have argued that Christ's heavenly presentation of his blood fulfills the typology established in Leviticus 16. Theologians who support the view that Jesus presented his blood to heaven have thus proposed that Christ experienced two ascensions: one immediately after John 20:17, during which he presented His blood in heaven, and another as recorded in the Book of Acts. However, The notion of a second ascension inferred from John 20:17 has been challenged by theologians such as John Walvoord. This doctrine is often grounded in Hebrews 9:12 and hinges on the interpretation of the Greek preposition dia (“by, through”). In his commentary, Franz Delitzsch explains that, just as the high priest entered the Holy of Holies by means of blood, so too did Jesus. Yet, Delitzsch ultimately concludes that Jesus did not present his blood in heaven separately from his body; rather, his glorified body itself contained the presented blood. This view, however, was rejected by J. Vernon McGee, who maintained that Christ's glorified body does not contain blood and thus presented the blood separately form his body.

The doctrine that Jesus presented his blood in heaven is often supported by the belief in the imperishability of Christ's blood, a view commonly based on 1 Peter 1:18–19, which contrasts his blood with perishable things. However, others interpret this passage as emphasizing the eternal value of his blood rather than asserting its physical incorruptibility.
