= Unisex changing rooms =

Changing rooms not separated by sex or gender

Unisex changing rooms are changing rooms that are not separated on the basis of sex or gender. Unisex changing rooms can sometimes be single-user changing rooms and can be referred to as inclusive changing rooms.

== Canada ==
Some community centers and swimming pools in Canada have inclusive changing rooms.

== New Zealand ==
City councils in Auckland, Christchurch, Wellington, and other major New Zealand cities are increasing the number of gender-neutral single-cubicle changing rooms.

== Portugal ==
Some schools in Portugal have added individual gender-neutral locker rooms, with the needs of transgender students in mind. However, some students used the rooms for reasons of privacy.

== United States ==
The American Institute of Architects (AIA) maintains a best practices document related to inclusive locker rooms and restrooms. According to the AIA, inclusive locker rooms protect privacy by being "arranged in a shared, semi-public space" with a "mix of individual, private rooms" as well as "highly visible, non-gender-segregated multi-user spaces".

The architectural firm Gensler has partnered with the LGBTQ advocacy group Athlete Ally to develop guidelines for inclusive changing rooms.

Some public schools in Vermont have "gender-free" locker rooms and single-stall showers to accommodate transgender and non-binary students.

== See also ==
- Accessible toilet
- Mixed bathing
- Unisex public toilet
