= Independent Baptist =

Christian denomination

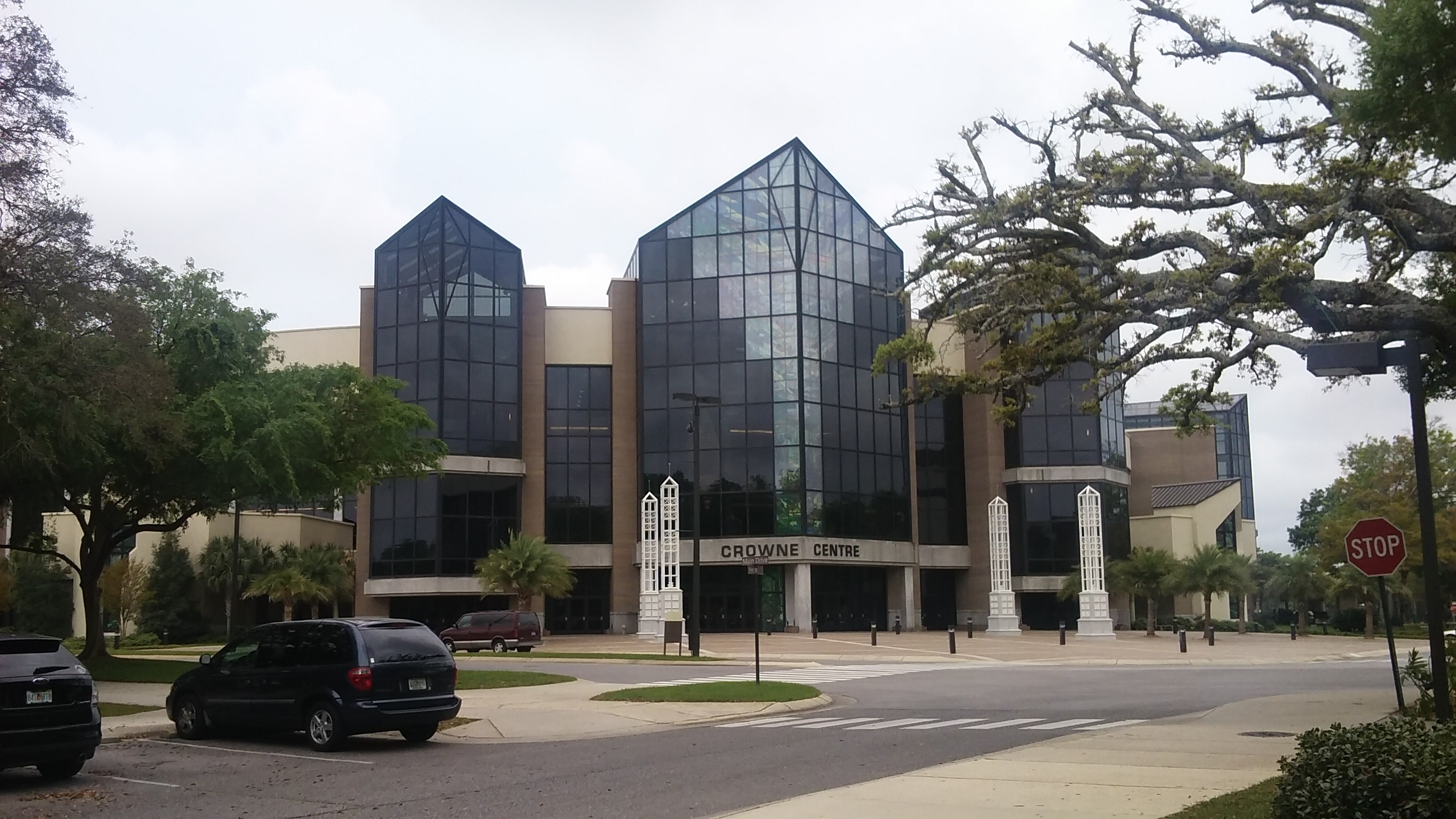
The Crowne Center at Pensacola Christian College in Pensacola, Florida, an IFB institution

Independent Baptist churches (also called Independent Fundamental Baptists or IFB) are Christian congregations that generally hold to fundamentalist or conservative views of evangelical Christianity and Baptist beliefs, such as believer's baptism, individual soul liberty, and the priesthood of all believers.

The term "independent" refers to the doctrinal position of church autonomy and a refusal to join any affiliated Baptist denominations or non-Baptist association, though they usually maintain some sort of fellowship with like-minded churches. As fundamentalists, these churches are strongly opposed to the ecumenical movement.

Around 3% of the United States adult population belongs to the IFB movement, half of whom live in the Southern United States.

== History ==
The modern IFB movement began in the early 20th century among local Baptist congregations whose members were concerned about the advancement of modernism or theological liberalism into national Baptist denominations in the U.S. In response to the concerns, some local Baptist churches separated from their former denominations and re-established their congregations as independent churches. In other cases, the more conservative members of existing churches withdrew from their local congregations and established new IFB churches. However, earlier churches such as the Metropolitan Tabernacle led by Charles Spurgeon have been also associated with IFBs, as they separated from the British Baptist Union to become a self standing church due to holding more conservative beliefs than the Union.

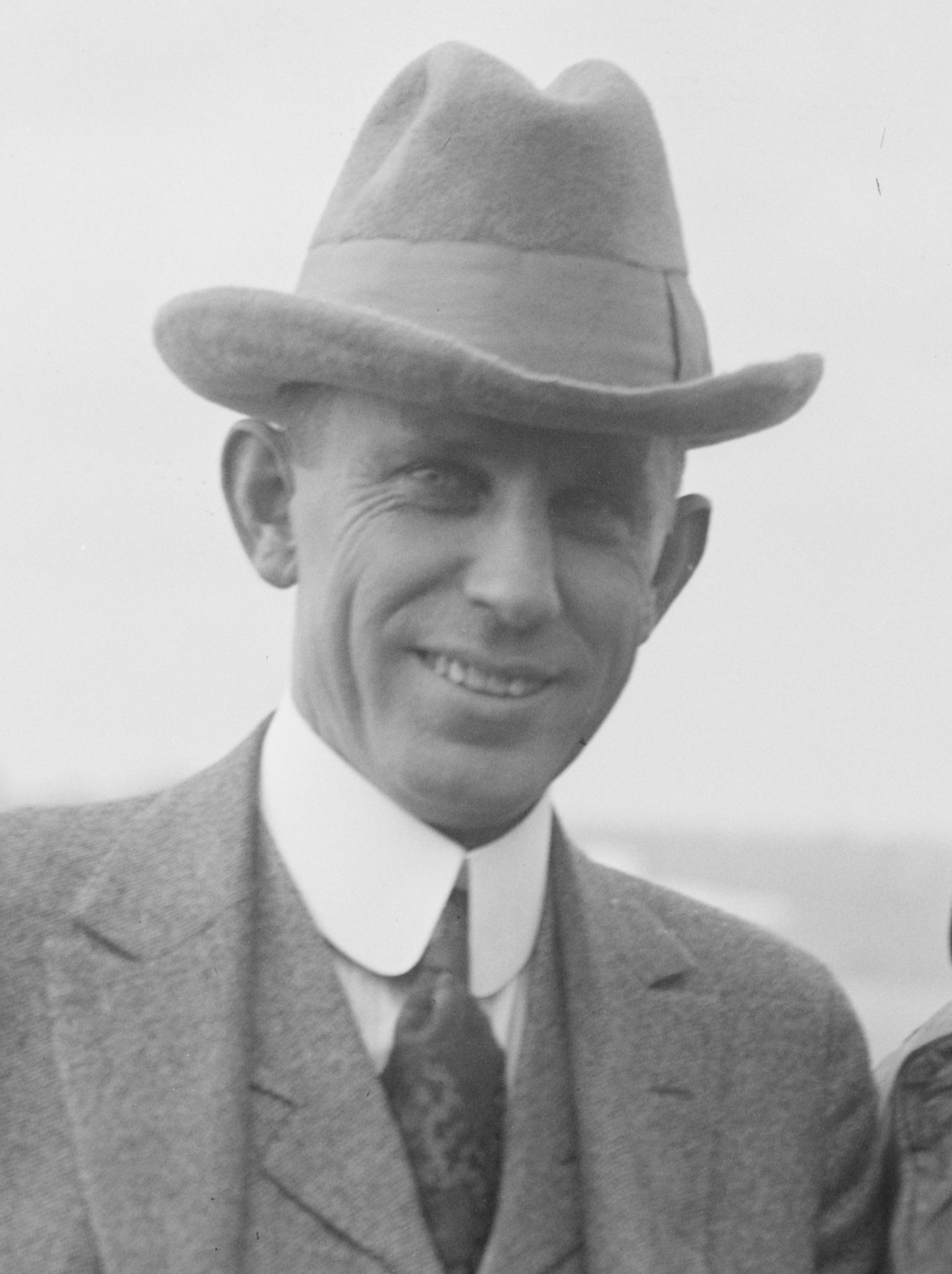
In the 1930s, Norris organized a group of independent, premillennial Baptist churches into the Premillennial Missionary Baptist Fellowship (later the World Baptist Fellowship)

The World Baptist Fellowship (originally the Premillennial Missionary Baptist Fellowship) is an IFB organization founded by J. Frank Norris (1877–1952) in Fort Worth, Texas, in 1933 based on the idea of a fellowship consisting of independent, premillennial Baptist churches. This was done to combat what he saw as the "modernist" influences within the Southern Baptist Convention. However, after John Birch, a graduate of his seminary, was shot by Chinese Communists, he began very strongly to preach against communist influences in the U.S., and later urged U.S. President Harry Truman to recognize the State of Israel. Later, however, major divisions were created within his organization in 1950, leading to a rival group of IFBs led by Beauchamp Vick in Springfield, Missouri.

Other IFB organizations that were founded include the General Association of Regular Baptist Churches in 1932 (became independent in 1934), which separated from the Northern Baptist Convention; the Baptist Bible Fellowship International in 1950; the Southwide Baptist Fellowship in 1956; the Fundamental Baptist Fellowship International in 1967; the Independent Baptist Fellowship International in 1984; and the Independent Baptist Fellowship of North America in 1990. Various independent Baptist Bible colleges were also founded. Such organizations were also born outside the U.S., notably the Association of Fundamental Baptist Churches in the Philippines.

In 1934, the major IFB newspaper The Sword of the Lord was funded by John R. Rice, who edited the publication until his death on December 29, 1980. At first, it was simply the four-page paper of Fundamentalist (later, Galilean) Baptist Church of Dallas, where Rice was the pastor. The paper was handed out on the street, and Rice's daughters and other Sunday school children delivered it door-to-door. The chief editor of newspaper after Rice's death became Curtis Hutson, which has been highly controversial among IFB, as he held to a Free Grace view of salvation, believing that repentance is simply a synonym for belief in Christ. Some IFBs believe that Hutson changed the original stances of the newspaper held by Rice, while the current chief editor Shelton Smith argued that Rice did not disagree with the soteriological views of Hutson.

In 1959, Jack Hyles became the pastor of First Baptist Church of Hammond, which became the largest IFB church of the 20th century. When he arrived, the church had a membership of about seven hundred, many from affluent backgrounds. About a third of the members left the church after hearing Hyles' preaching style, which was very different from that to which they had been accustomed. Hyles then led the church to its status as an IFB church, freeing it from its ties with the American Baptists. Hyles started his bus ministry and soon shepherded the church from a congregation of several hundred to more than 20,000. In the early 1990s, a national survey ranked First Baptist Church of Hammond as the largest church in the nation, by average weekly attendance figures.

Within the 21st century, some IFBs voices have noticed a shift within some younger IFBs, particularly in their approach to separatism and their approach to theology. Paul Chappell notes that Millennial IFBs tend to emphasize theological knowledge and avoid the more rigid forms of the doctrine of separation. Although at the same time, the very radical New Independent Fundamental Baptist (New IFB) movement, founded by Steven Anderson, emerged out of the IFB movement and gained prominence online. However, mainstream IFB leaders have criticized the New IFB for its doctrinal positions, many of which are rejected by the broader IFB community today.

== Beliefs ==
Denominational beliefs are strictly Baptist. As Christian fundamentalists, they believe in the inspiration and inerrancy of the Bible, and great emphasis is also placed on a literal-historical interpretation of Scripture. Other common beliefs include separation of church and state, young Earth creationism (YEC), cessationism, and dispensationalism. In general, IFBs are opposed to theological liberalism, ecumenism, Roman Catholicism, the Charismatic movement, the ordination of women pastors, homosexuality, and evolution. Independent Baptist author are often also critical of the Magisterial reformers, including Martin Luther, John Calvin and Zwingli due to their hostile relations with the early Anabaptists.

=== Fundamentalism ===
As Christian fundamentalists, IFBs are opposed both to liberal Christianity and neo-evangelicalism (which is particularly associated with Billy Graham). IFBs believe that neo-evangelicalism errs by failing to practice separation sufficiently, rejecting its perceived ecumenical attitudes in some modern evangelical circles.

=== King James Onlyism ===
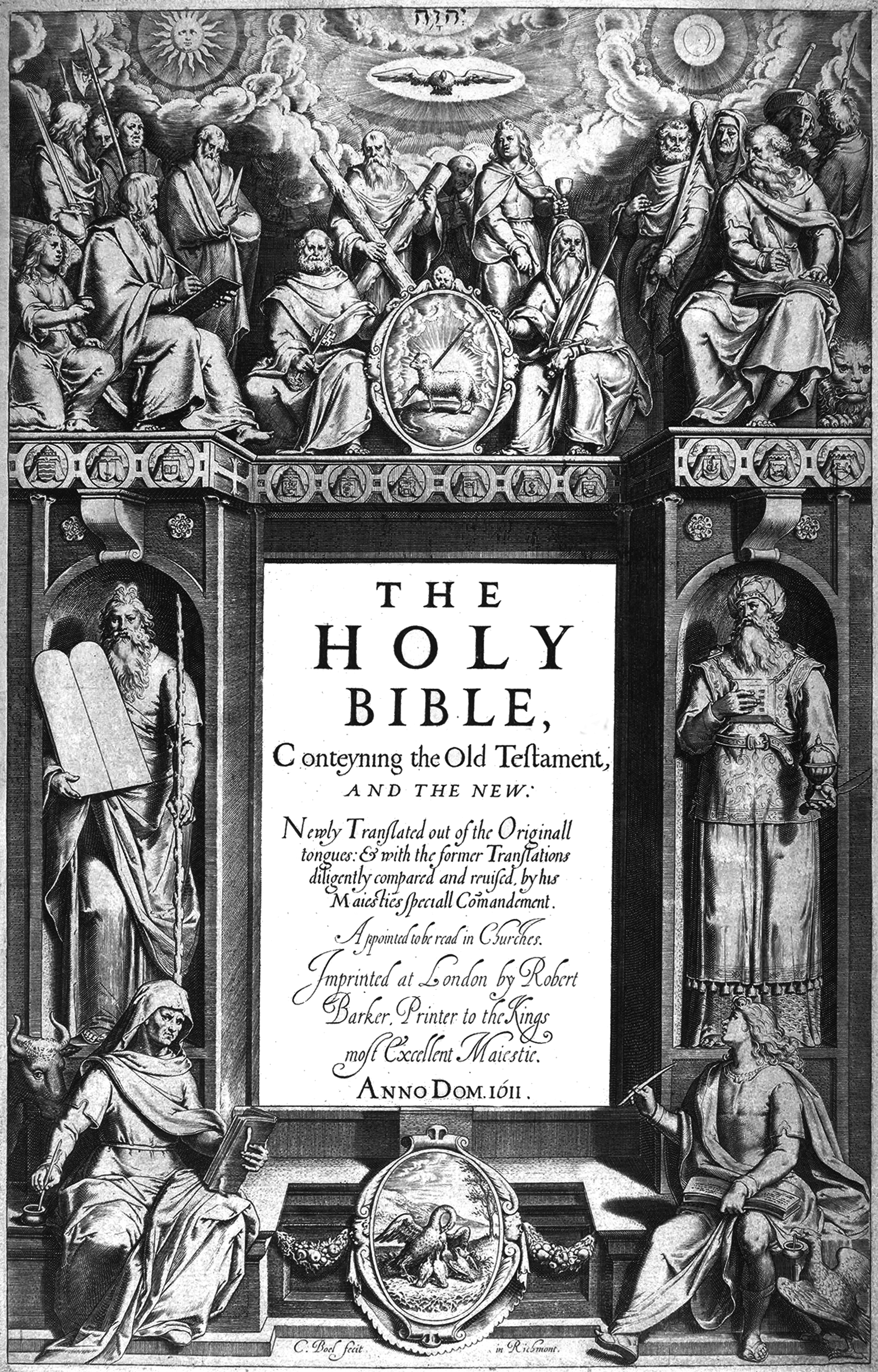
The title page to the 1611 first edition of the Authorized (King James) Version of the Bible. IFBs generally believe in different forms of King James Onlyism.

Many IFB churches adhere to only using the King James Version of the Bible (KJV), a position known as "King James Onlyism." David Cloud, an IFB author, drawing on the arguments of textual scholar and theologian Edward Hills, asserts that the KJV should not be viewed simply as a translation of the Greek and Hebrew texts. Instead, he regards it as an independent edition of the Textus Receptus itself, rendered in English rather than Greek, and providentially preserved as the purest form of the Textus Receptus. The King James Only position was also advocated by notable IFB pastors such as Hyles and Lester Roloff, who maintained that the King James Bible is the perfectly preserved the Word of God in English. Similarly, Jack Chick, who was best known for his comic tracts, also advocated a King James Only position. A more extreme form of King James Onlyism was developed by Peter Ruckman, who argued that the KJV constitutes "new revelation" or "advanced revelation" and is superior to the original Greek and Hebrew manuscripts. However, some IFBs like Rice, Hutson, Lee Roberson, R. L. Hymers Jr., and others took a more moderate position in arguing that although the King James Bible is preferable to most modern translations because of its manuscript tradition, it is not divinely inspired.

IFBs who support newer translations of the Bible acknowledge that there are varying opinions on textual matters. However, they believe that the fundamental concern is what the translators of the KJV advocated for: that the average person should have access to the Bible in a language they can understand.

Among IFB institutions which rejects King James Onlyism is Detroit Baptist Theological Seminary. The institution treats only the original manuscripts of the Bible as the inerrant Word of God, a position that places it in opposition to the King James Only movement, which asserts that the original manuscripts no longer exist due to their being thousands of years old. King James Onlyists have criticized DBTS (together with Bob Jones University and other institutions, including Central Baptist Theological Seminary) for playing an influential role in convincing some IFB groups to adopt modern Bible translations.

=== Soteriology ===
IFBs overwhelmingly believe in salvation by grace through faith alone and eternal security, but they may differ slightly from each other on other positions. Some align with Free Grace theology, such as Hyles, Hutson, Ernest Pickering, Smith, and Ruckman. Others, including Hymers, Jr., and Cloud, believe true repentance is abandoning sins and that salvation changes how a person lives, however, they reject requiring a lost sinner to make Jesus Christ "Lord" of their entire life. There are also some IFBs who espouse Lordship salvation and a few may even embrace moderate Calvinistic views. IFBs often emphasize the distinction between law and gospel, a concept famously illustrated in Roloff's sermon "Dr. Law and Dr. Grace." In this sermon, Roloff described the law as revealing humanity's sins and exposing their inability to attain righteousness through their own works. This understanding, he explained, serves to guide individuals toward grace, where they can find forgiveness and redemption.

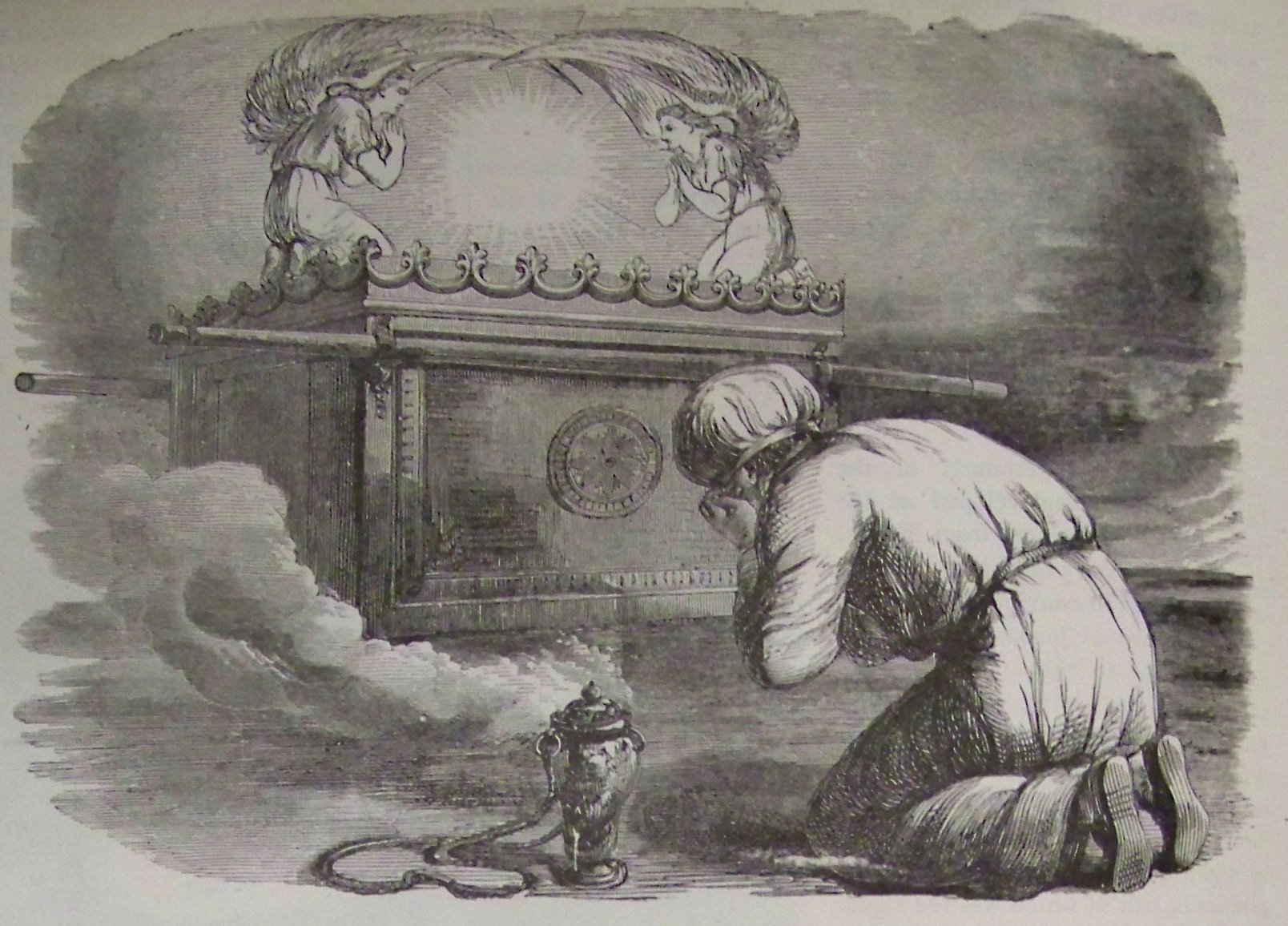
The Mercy Seat, illustration from the 1890 Holman Bible. IFBs often believe that Jesus took his blood to a heavenly mercy seat.

Most IFBs strongly believe that the literal shedding of blood on the cross was a central part of Christ's atoning work, rejecting the view that the Biblical references to blood are intended as metaphors for death and instead emphasize the literal and physical aspect. Many also teach that after his resurrection, Jesus presented his blood on the heavenly mercy seat, often considering the literal blood of Christ as the object of faith for salvation in the New Testament. A few such as Hymers, Jr., have stated that when preaching the gospel, one needs to include both the death of Jesus and the blood of Jesus. This position is in direct contrast to the position mostly associated with Robert Thieme, who rejected the bleeding of Christ as a part of the propitiation, and John F. MacArthur has also stated similar views. IFBs such as Hymers, Jr., have emphasized that due to the unity of the Person of Christ in His two natures, the blood of Jesus can also be called the blood of God.

Some IFBs adhere to the Sinner's Prayer, which is a prayer of confession to God by an unbeliever who has the desire to be saved, and they see reciting such a prayer as the moment defining one's salvation. However, others such as Cloud have criticized the sinner's prayer as leading to inauthentic conversions and calling it "quick prayerism." The claim that prayer is necessary to be saved was also critiqued by Hyles in a sermon entitled "Fundamentalist Heresy."

IFBs tend to reject atonement theories such as the governmental theory and the moral influence theory, but instead believe that Jesus' substitutionary bloody death paid the penalty of sin.

=== Doctrine of separation ===
IFBs usually believe that members of a church should be separate from worldliness or "the world" and not have association with those who are "of the world" (unbelievers), however, different IFBs vary in what to them constitutes separation in specific areas.

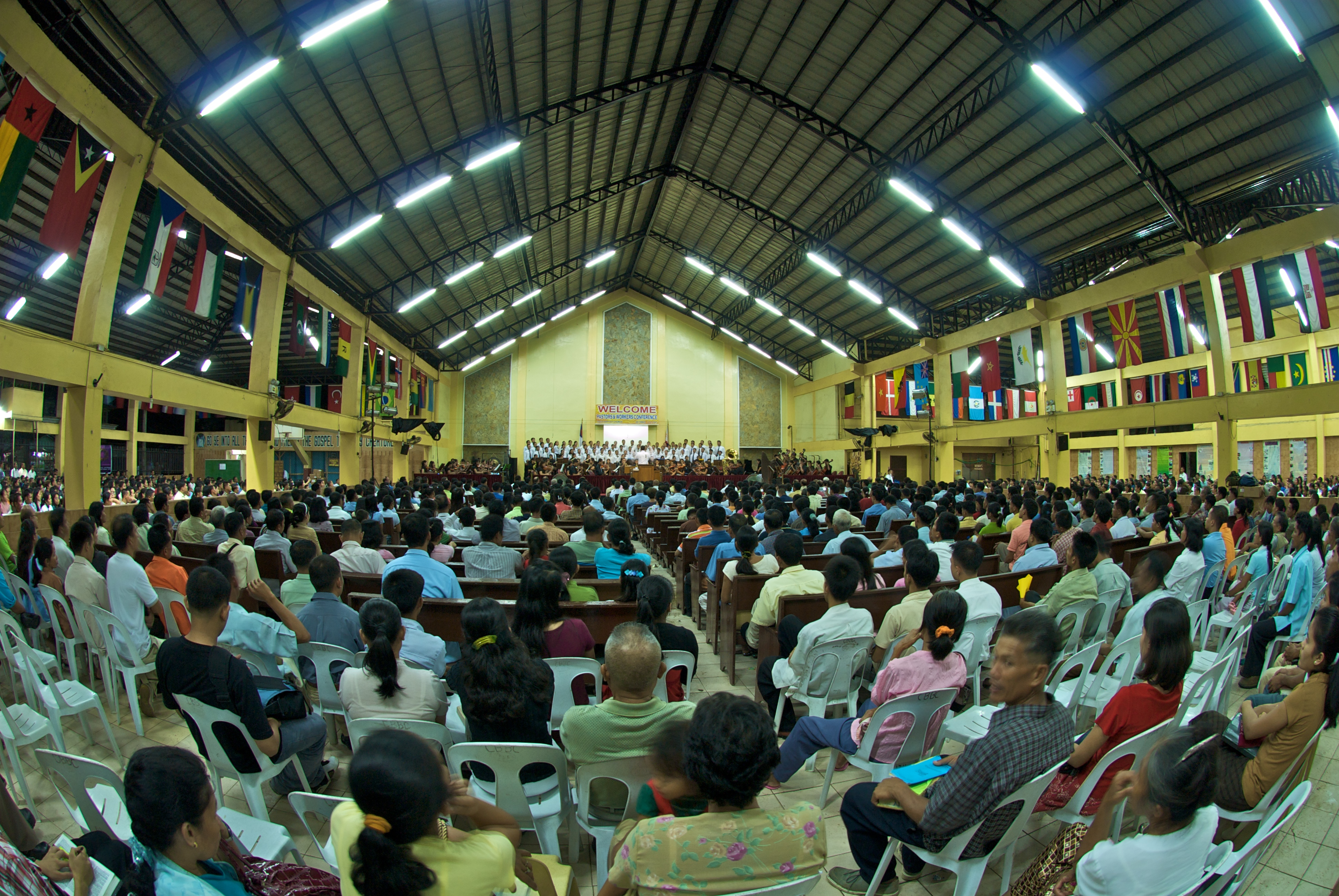
Service at Iloilo Baptist Church, Iloilo City, Philippines.

Additionally, there is a distinction between first and second degree separation. IFBs want to live in a way that is distinct from the typical lifestyle of the world (first degree). Some would claim that not only should one separate from the world, but also from those Christians who will not separate themselves from the world (second degree), and believe that Christians who are tied up with the things of "the world" are themselves guilty of apostasy for their failure to adequately separate. The more rigid second degree separation was opposed by Rice and Hutson, however it was affirmed by Hyles. Among IFBs, Chappell has also warned of being "hyper-separated," arguing that separation and collaboration needs to be taken with a balance.

A few IFBs believe in the more rigid so-called "third degree separation," which is the belief that one needs to separate from fellow IFBs who do not practice secondary separation.

=== Ecclesiology ===
Many IFBs adhere to some form of "Baptist successionism" (or Baptist perpetuity), the belief that Baptists trace their origins through a lineage of Christians dating back to the Apostles with medieval groups cited as pre-Reformation representatives of Baptist principles. Thus, as a consequence IFBs tend to view themselves as distinct from Protestantism.

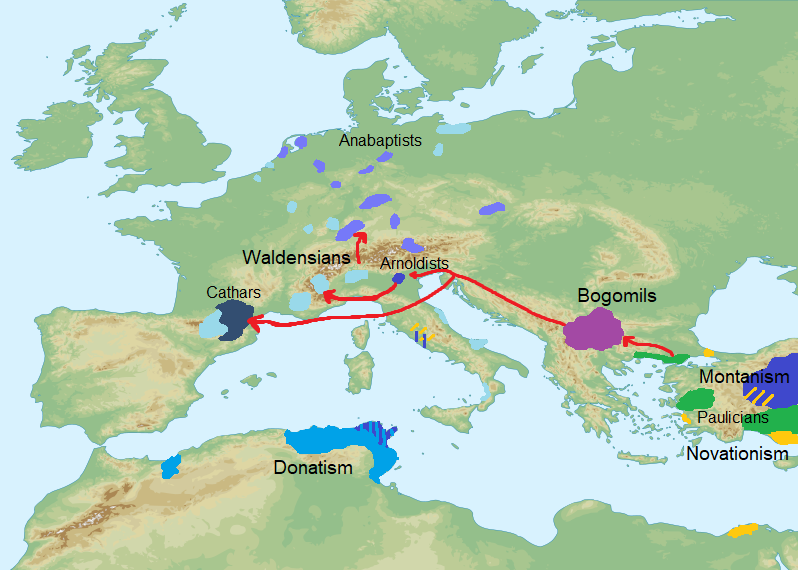
Baptist successionism as laid out by James Milton Carroll. Other sects are sometimes included in the theory

Some proponents of Baptist successionism take this further by embracing Landmarkism or "Baptist bride theology," the view that only Baptist churches constitute the body or bride of Christ and that only Baptists will be raptured and partake in the marriage supper of the Lamb. They also claim that the Baptist Church began with John the Baptist or Jesus himself. However, this perspective is not universally accepted within the IFB movement and has been criticized for denying the universal body of Christ comprising all true believers.

IFBs reject the ordination of women pastors and deacons in a church according to the Apostle Paul's writings in 1 Timothy 2, Titus, and 1 Corinthians 14.

Many IFBs believe that according to 1 Timothy 3:2 and Titus 1:6-7 a pastor cannot be divorced, however, some reject this interpretation. Ruckman argued that being "blameless" has nothing to do with divorce because he believed that a pastor can be remarried to one wife and that Paul is mainly addressing polygamy in those passages.

Baptist churches that adhere to fundamentalism often call themselves "Independent Baptist Church," "Bible Baptist Church," or "Fundamental Baptist Church" to demonstrate their membership in the movement.

=== Worship music ===
Most IFB churches exclusively use traditional worship during their services, however, there are some that have a mixture of traditional and contemporary worship styles. Many IFBs such as Hyles, Chick, Chappell, Cloud, Pickering, and Smith have criticized and rejected the use of contemporary Christian music (CCM). Such leaders argue that styles such as rock and pop music are overly emotional, entertainment-focused, and man-centered, making them unsuitable for use in services. According to them, biblical principles should guide Christians to use hymns rather than CCM, which they feel lacks the reverence and theological depth appropriate for worship.

=== Views on alcohol ===
IFBs hold that the Bible forbids partaking of alcohol altogether and argue that some alleged alcoholic drinks in the Bible are only medicinal uses of alcohol. They also argue that wine in the Bible can also refer to non-alcoholic beverages such as unfermented grape juice, and for this reason the context must determine which meaning is required. In passages where beverages are viewed negatively, IFBs understand them to mean fermented wine, and where they are viewed positively, they understand them to mean unfermented wine. According to this view, they believe that the wine in the Last Supper could not have been fermented, because they believe that the fermentation of wine is similar to the fermentation of bread through yeast, which they view as a symbol of sin. Thus, IFBs have argued that such wine cannot symbolize the blood of Christ.

=== Other issues ===
Most IFBs adhere to a pre-Tribulation view of the Rapture, although a minority subscribe to mid-Tribulation or post-Tribulation interpretations. The movement encompasses a range of theological and ideological perspectives, with notable variation on issues such as Calvinism, expressions of patriotism, belief in certain conspiracy theories, dispensational salvation, interpretations of biblical accounts involving giants, and details on the relationships between the Persons of the Trinity, such as the classical Trinitarian doctrine of the eternal generation of the Son, among other views.

Regarding creation, IFBs typically align with either YEC or gap creationism, a form of old Earth creationism that accommodates an ancient universe while maintaining a literal reading of Genesis. While the majority reject modern flat Earth beliefs, a very small subset affirms geocentric creationism that retains a spherical Earth but places it at the center of the cosmos.

In terms of Christology, IFBs tend to uphold orthodox theological positions and affirm the historic condemnations of heresies such as monophysitism, Nestorianism, Apollinarianism, and monothelitism. Nevertheless, a few within the movement have questioned whether monothelitism should be classified as heretical.

== Relationships to other Christians ==
=== Validity of Baptisms ===
Concerning prior baptisms, IFBs are generally divided into two main groups: Open Baptists and Closed Baptists. Open Baptists accept baptisms performed by any Christian group, provided the baptism was conducted via immersion in the Trinitarian formula and administered to a professing believer. In contrast, Closed Baptists recognize only baptisms conducted within Baptist churches as valid. While the open view is more widespread in modern times, Landmarkists continue to reject non-Baptist baptisms as illegitimate, even if done by immersion.

=== Non-denominationalism ===
Pickering voiced concern over the trend among some Baptists to abandon their denominational identity in favor of a non-denominational label. Although he acknowledged that many sincere Christians exist outside Baptist circles and personally rejected Landmarkist theology, Pickering warned that discarding the Baptist name often indicates a drift away from core Baptist convictions. He argued that such moves undermine unity among Baptist, fundamentalist, and separatist churches and open the door to ecumenical compromises. Pickering urged Baptists to preserve their distinct identity in order to maintain their theological and ecclesiastical integrity.

=== Thiemism ===
IFBs are highly opposed to the doctrines and the movement of Robert Thieme, and have called for the necessity of separation from Thieme's teaching, particularly due to his teachings on issues such as the atonement which IFBs view as major issues.

=== New IFB ===
IFBs such as Cloud have been highly critical of the New IFB movement, viewing it as heretical. Cloud has argued that their views such as that Jesus paid for sins by burning in Hell and that homosexuals cannot be saved are unbiblical. Additionally, Cloud has associated their imprecatory prayers for people such as Obama to be cultic.

=== Southern Baptists ===
Many influential IFBs originally separated from the Southern Baptist Convention (SBC), especially due to different convictions on the topic of separation, Bible versions, and ecclesiology. Many in the IFB movement have been critical of the more centralized governance of the SBC, instead preferring fully independent church structure. Particularly differentiating IFBs today from the Southern Baptists is the distinction between fundamentalism and neo-evangelicalism, as although both espouse conservative views, they differ on the topic of separation. However, some IFBs still wish to maintain close ties to the SBC.

== Social, moral and cultural issues ==
=== Entertainment ===
IFBs are sometimes skeptical of things such as television and professional sports, believing that modern entertainment is often too "worldly." Nevertheless, some IFBs are more lenient on entertainment, which has drawn criticism from other IFB writers such as Cloud, who believes that they have fallen into allowing worldliness in the name of joy.

=== Euthanasia ===
IFBs believe euthanasia to be sinful, believing it to contradict the Sixth Commandment. They believe that euthanasia takes away opportunities from people to be saved by believing in the blood of Christ or earn rewards, which God has given them.

=== Sexuality ===
IFBs believe that homosexuality is sinful. They believe that marriage is only biblically allowed between one man and woman, that sexual relations outside marriage are sinful, and often believe that a person's sexual orientation cannot be changed. However, they believe that homosexuals can be saved still by the atonement of Jesus Christ. In distinction, the New IFB movement differs from this view, believing that homosexuals can never be saved and should be subject to capital punishment.

=== Sexual abuse ===
In 2018, an investigation by the Fort Worth Star-Telegram identified 412 abuse allegations in 187 IFB churches and institutions across the U.S. and Canada, with some cases reaching as far back as the 1970s. In November 2023, Investigation Discovery released Let Us Prey: A Ministry of Scandals, a four-part documentary highlighting sexual abuse and cover up within the IFB movement.

IFB authors have responded to sexual abuse scandals in various ways. Smith has argued that while IFBs need to take allegations seriously, he has still expressed skepticism on the cases of cover up happening in large scale within the IFB movement. Some IFB such as Cloud have instead reacted to these allegations by arguing that they are only common in certain segments of the IFB movement. Cloud in response stated that other IFBs already attempted to deal with these cases in the 1980s and 1990s. To this, the IFB author Chappell also made a statement that IFBs need to have an increased compassion for those who have been victims of abuse, and critiqued those IFB who did not want to openly discuss the issue, although he rejected the claim that those cases of abuse characterize a majority of the movement.

== Notable individuals associated with the IFB movement ==
- Ben M. Bogard (1868–1951)
- John Roach Straton (1875–1929)
- J. Frank Norris (1877–1952)
- Mordecai Ham (1877–1961)
- John R. Rice (1895–1980)
- Robert T. Ketcham (1889–1978)
- George Beauchamp Vick (1901–1975)
- David Otis Fuller (1903–1988)
- Lee Roberson (1909–2007)
- Lester Roloff (1914–1982)
- Oliver B. Greene (1915–1976)
- George W. Dollar (1917–2006)
- John Birch (1918–1945)
- Peter Ruckman (1921–2016)
- Robert Sumner (1922–2016)
- Maze Jackson (1923–1996)
- Jack Chick (1924–2016)
- Jack Hyles (1926–2001)
- John A. Stormer (1928–2018)
- Ernest Pickering (1928–2000)
- Arlin Horton (born 1928)
- Rebekah "Beka" Horton (1929-2020)
- Rolland D. McCune (1934–2019)
- Curtis Hutson (1934–1995)
- Gérard Dagon (1936–2011)
- R. L. Hymers Jr. (born 1941)
- Shelton Smith (born 1942)
- Michael Pearl (born 1945)
- Gerardus D. Bouw (1945–2023)
- Clarence Sexton (1948–2023)
- Chuck Baldwin (born 1952)
- Kent Hovind (born 1953)
- Paul Chappell (born 1962)
- Gary Click (born 1965)

== See also ==
- American Baptist Association
- Association of Independent Methodists
- Baptist International Missions, Inc.
- Baptist Missionary Association of America
- IFCA International
- Landmarkism
- List of Independent Baptist higher education institutions
- Southwide Baptist Fellowship

== Bibliography ==
- Timothy Gloege, Guaranteed Pure: The Moody Bible Institute, Business, and the Making of Modern Evangelicalism (2015).
- Barry Hankins, God's Rascal: J. Frank Norris & the Beginnings of Southern Fundamentalism (1996).
- Andrew Himes, The Sword of the Lord: The Roots of Fundamentalism in an American Family (2011).
- George M. Marsden, Fundamentalism and American Culture: The Shaping of Twentieth Century Evangelicalism, 1870–1925 (1980).
- Robert F. Martin, Hero of the Heartland: Billy Sunday and the Transformation of American Society, 1862–1935 (2002).
- White, James (1995), The King James Only Controversy: Can You Trust the Modern Translations?, Minneapolis: Bethany House, p. 248, ISBN 1-55661-575-2, OCLC 32051411
- Daniel K. Williams, God's Own Party: The Making of the Christian Right (2010).
