= WCTS =

Coordinates: 44°52′01″N 92°54′02″W

- Maplewood, Minnesota; United States
- Broadcast area: Minneapolis-St. Paul
- Frequency: 1030 kHz
- Branding: WCTS FM 97.9 / AM 1030

Programming
- Format: Christian talk and teaching
- Affiliations: SRN News

Ownership
- Owner: Central Baptist Theological Seminary of Minneapolis

History
- First air date: May 18, 1964
- Former call signs: WRCR (1964–1967); WJSW (1967–1973); WMIN (1973–)
- Call sign meaning: Central Theological Seminary

Technical information
- Licensing authority: FCC
- Facility ID: 12114
- Class: B
- Power: 50,000 watts (days); 4,000 watts (nights)
- Translator: 97.9 K250BY (Plymouth)

Links
- Public license information: Public file; LMS
- Webcast: Listen live
- Website: WCTSradio.org

WCTS (1030 kHz, "The Bible Station") is a non-commercial AM radio station licensed to Maplewood, Minnesota, and serving the Twin Cities. It broadcasts a Christian talk and teaching radio format and is owned by the Central Baptist Theological Seminary of Minneapolis, hence the call letters. The radio studios and offices are in Plymouth.

By day, WCTS transmits 50,000 watts, the maximum for AM stations. Because 1030 AM is a clear channel frequency reserved for WBZ in Boston, WCTS reduces power to 4,000 watts at night and uses a directional antenna at all times, with a five-tower array at night. The transmitter is on Woodbury Drive at Glacial Valley Road in Woodbury. Programming is also heard on 250 watt FM translator K250BY at 97.9 MHz, broadcasting from atop the IDS Center in downtown Minneapolis. The signal is directional to the northwest and southeast, to protect other stations nearby or on the same frequency.

== History ==
The history of WCTS (1030 AM) comprises two stations: one at 100.3FM and the other at the current 1030 AM.

=== 1030 AM ===
The station that is now WCTS started with a 250-watt daytime-only signal at 1010 AM. The construction permit was awarded to Gerald H. Bell trading as Ramsey Broadcasting Company on February 13, 1963, and the station bore the call sign WGHB before changing to WRCR on December 13, 1963. It began broadcasting as WRCR (Washington–Ramsey County Radio on May 18, 1964. In 1967, the station changed call signs to WJSW, broadcasting polka music and other formats.

When WMIN dropped its longtime call letters in 1972, WJSW grabbed them and became the new WMIN. By this time, it was airing a full service, Middle of the Road (MOR) format. For many years, the station's transmitter site was located on South Century Drive in Maplewood, the city of license, where the studios were co-located.

In the mid-1980s, the station moved to 1030 AM, along with a significant boost in daytime power. It continued its MOR format and briefly simulcast KARE-TV's evening news. WMIN played country music from 1986 to 1988 and then flipped to an oldies format, which evolved into adult standards a year later.

=== WCTS 100.3 FM ===
WCTS signed on in 1965 on 100.3 FM, with a format consisting mostly of conservative evangelists and Bible teachings by the Fourth Baptist Church in north Minneapolis.

Colfax Communications, a startup company based in Minneapolis, purchased the FM station in early 1993 and in turn bought 1030 AM to sell back to the seminary so the seminary would continue to have a broadcast voice. Colfax took the FM station off the air for a few months and signed on again as WBOB on May 13, launching a country music format under the "Bob 100" moniker.

WMIN became WCTS on February 5, 1993, and seminary programming remains to this day. The WMIN call letters were immediately picked up by a Hudson, Wisconsin-based station at 740 AM and used there until 2008, when that station changed its call letters to WDGY.

== Translator ==
Broadcast translator for WCTS
Call sign	Frequency	City of license	FID	ERP (W)	Class	FCC info
K250BY	97.9 FM	Plymouth, Minnesota	202408	250	D	LMS

WCTS moved its translator to the IDS Center in downtown Minneapolis, following a feud with KPPS-LP, which withdrew its application for the channel. The move to the IDS improved the translator's coverage of the metro area.

== See also ==
- WMIN
- KMNV
- KTLK-FM
