= W. O. Saunders =

American writer

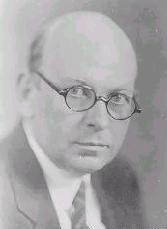
William Oscar "W. O." Saunders

William Oscar "W. O." Saunders (1884–1940) was an American newspaper publisher, journalist, essayist, magazine contributor, satirist, and social critic of rural American life and culture. One of his most famous writings was "The Book of Ham."

== Reputation ==
Saunder's bravery and willingness to champion unpopular causes and opinions compared to many in the South was admired by other writers and newspapers. H. L. Mencken wrote of Saunders that "if the South had forty editors like Saunders, it could be rid of its problems in five years." When Saunders wrote stridently in his editorials against lynching in the South, some northern newspapers reprinted and commented on his material. One of the editors of The New York Age declared:

"We wish again to express our admiration for Mr. Saunders. He lives in a Southern state and openly publishes his brave, strong words against the sins' of the people amongst whom he lives. If anybody doubts that this takes real courage, he knows nothing about the question."

== The Independent ==
In 1907, Saunders founded The Independent newspaper and would remain its editor for over 20 years. Saunders was unafraid to confront what he saw as graft and corruption. The Independent, by his hard lhitting editorials, became the instrument of his crusades and resulted in him being sued for libel over 50 times. He won every case. He was assaulted, shot at, and once had to run to escape tar and feathering. He began wearing a soft cap because of having so many bowler hats destroyed by people angry with something he had written.

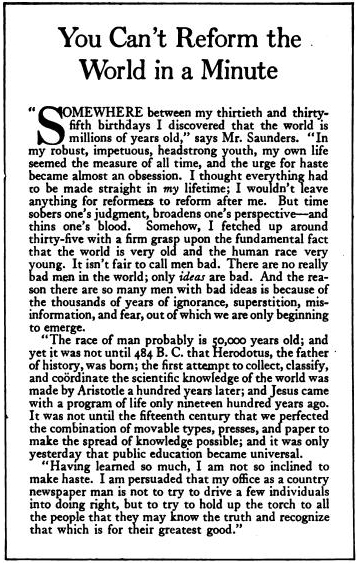
a Saunders editorial from the Independent, circa 1922

== Political career ==
Saunders, with a lifelong interest in politic issues, was elected to the North Carolina General Assembly. He proposed key legislative changes to the use of the death penalty and the standardization of weights and measures for farmers. The weights and measures bill was passed, but he death penalty measures that he proposed were defeated. Saunders also agitated in the legislature for better treatment of children under 14 working in factories.

In 1923, Saunders represented Elizabeth City on the North Carolina Fisheries Commission

== Defence of Julius Rosenwald ==
Saunders had strong beliefs about confronting corruption and bad behavior, in government or in other social institutions such as the church. In 1924, Saunders became involved in a long-running controversy, the "Battle of Elizabeth City." That year, a visiting Evangelist, Mordecai Ham, began an evangelistic campaign in Elizabeth City, North Carolina. Ham initiated a slanderous campaign against a prominent Jew, Julius Rosenwald, the president of Sears-Roebuck and a well-known philanthropist. Ham accused Rosenwald of organizing interracial prostitution rings exploiting white women. Saunders investigated Ham's claims, found them to be false, and published a series of critical editorials in The Independent. Saunders contacted the District Attorney of Chicago and prominent Chicago church leaders, journalists and businessmen to examine Ham's accusations against Rosenwald. They unanimously agreed that the charges were untrue and absurd.

A prominent state attorney in Chicago, Robert E. Crowe telegrammed Saunders: "If the charges that you refer to were not so maliciously false I would term them silly." The President of the Chicago Baptist Ministers Association, Dr. Johnson Myers, said, "He has helped Protestant churches and scores of other good institutions. He has been the friend of every good cause.... Such false charges made by an evangelist ought to discredit him in your community.

Saunders then published a collection of material on Ham's antisemitism and unfounded accusations in pamphlet form as "The Book of Ham."

== Civil rights ==
Saunders is credited for his editorials, strongly argued and worded, to prevent the lynching of an African American who had been wrongly accused of raping a child. He also agitated for the County Commissioners to fund agricultural advisors for black farmers.

== Wright Brothers Monument ==
Saunders used his journalistic and organisational abilities to promote the role of the Wright brothers in the history of North Carolina. He published an interview with one of the eyewitnesses of their historic flight, John T. Daniels, in Colliers Magazine in 1927. He has been seen as the originator of the plan to build a monument to the Wright Brothers at Kitty Hawk. Saunders was the President of the Kill Devil Hills Memorial Association, the group that organized the building of the memorial. He achieved his goal and was part of the official party at the groundbreaking ceremony for the memorial on February 4, 1931. He later wrote a souvenir guide to the Wright Brother's Memorial.

In 1937, Saunders wrote a second historical guide to the area, including the memorial and Fort Raleigh on Roanoke Island(see section below).

== "The Lost Colony" ==
Saunders had a keen interest in local history. He helped lead the Roanoke Island Historical Association with D. B Fearing, a state senator from Dare County. When he was travelling in Germany Saunders went to a passion play, the extensive outdoor religious play at Oberammergau, Bavaria. He was so impressed that he began to dream of a similar spectacle in North Carolina involving an outdoor production of the historical accounts of a 16th-century English settlement on Roanoke Island, founded by associates of Sir Walter Raleigh. The colony mysteriously disappeared without a trace during the Anglo-Spanish War. He contacted Frederick Koch, the founder of the PlayMakers Repertory Company, at the University of North Carolina to help create such a play. That led to the writing of a "The Lost Colony" outdoor drama by Pulitzer Prize-winning North Carolina author Paul Green. Saunders convinced Green to write the play for the 350th anniversary of the founding of the colony, which would be in 1937. The project had the enthusiastic backing of US Senator Josiah William Bailey and Congressman Lindsay Warren who heard Saunders present the idea while they were in North Carolina on a fishing expedition. The play became so well known that the President, Franklin Roosevelt came to one of the performances. The event was so popular that it continued to be performed, despite being originally planned as a one-off performance.

== Demolition of Independent newspaper office ==
In 2004, Saunders' old newspaper office, from which he had fought so many battles, was demolished. An addition to the local public library was built on the site. Local preservationists had fought to stop the building from being destroyed because of its significance to local history.

== Musical ==
A musical based on Saunder's life and exploits, "The Independent Man," is being written by Brian Hobbs, an accomplished musician who grew up in Elizabeth City and was involved in Musical Theater in New York. He attended Berklee College of Music in Boston, Massachusetts, and he now lives and works in Sweden. He previously wrote a musical on the life of poet Edgar Allan Poe.

== Sources ==
- Baker, J.T. The Battle of Elizabeth City: Christ and Antichrist in NC. North Carolina Historical Review. October 1977: 393-408. Division of Archives & History, North Carolina Department of Cultural Resources, 1977.
- Saunders, K. The Independent Man: The Story of W. O. Saunders and His Delightfully Different Newspaper. Washington: Saunders Press. 1962.
