= Mixed bathing =

Sharing of a place of water by both sexes

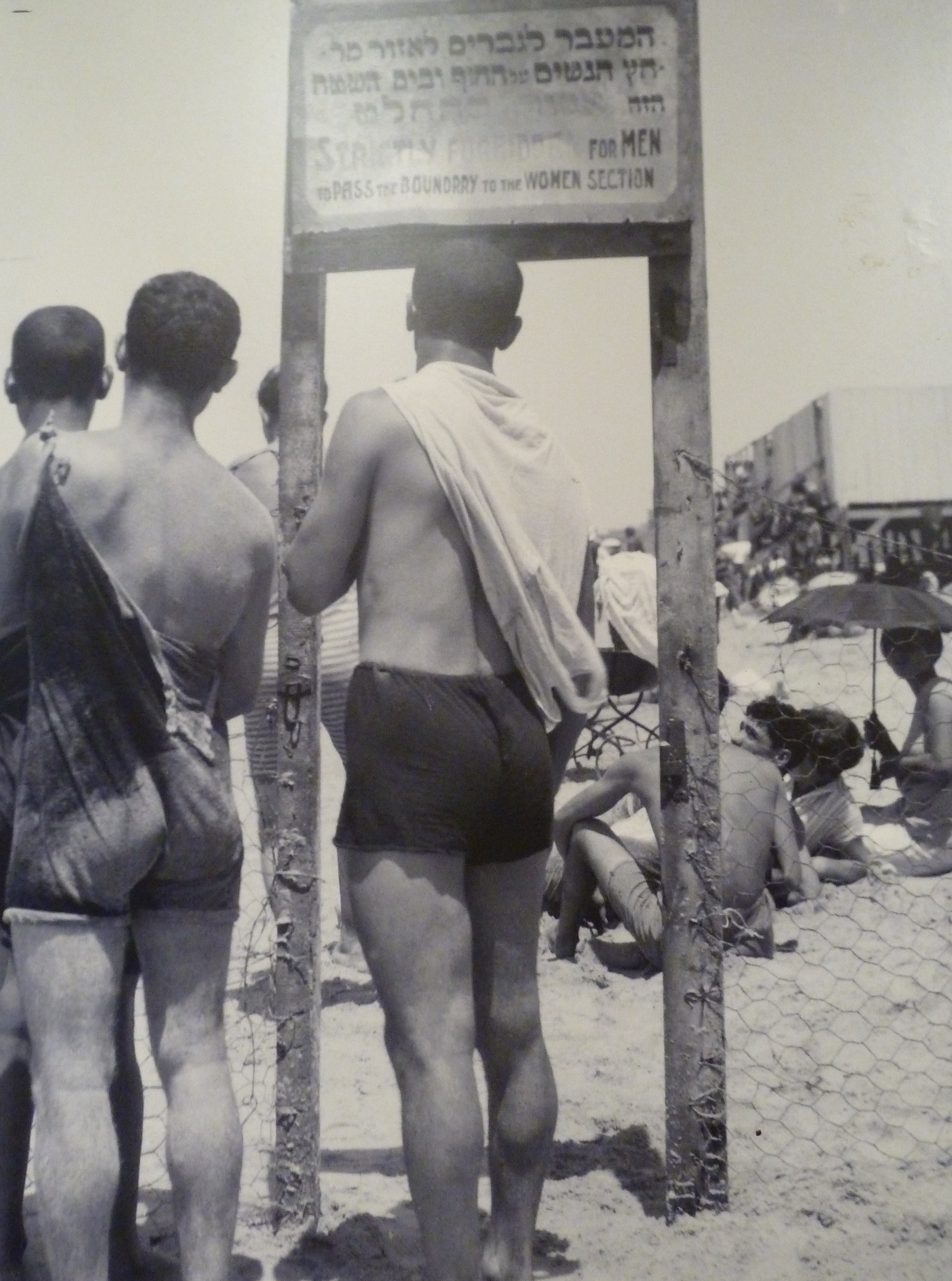
A sign forbidding men entering the women's section at Tel-Aviv beach, 1927

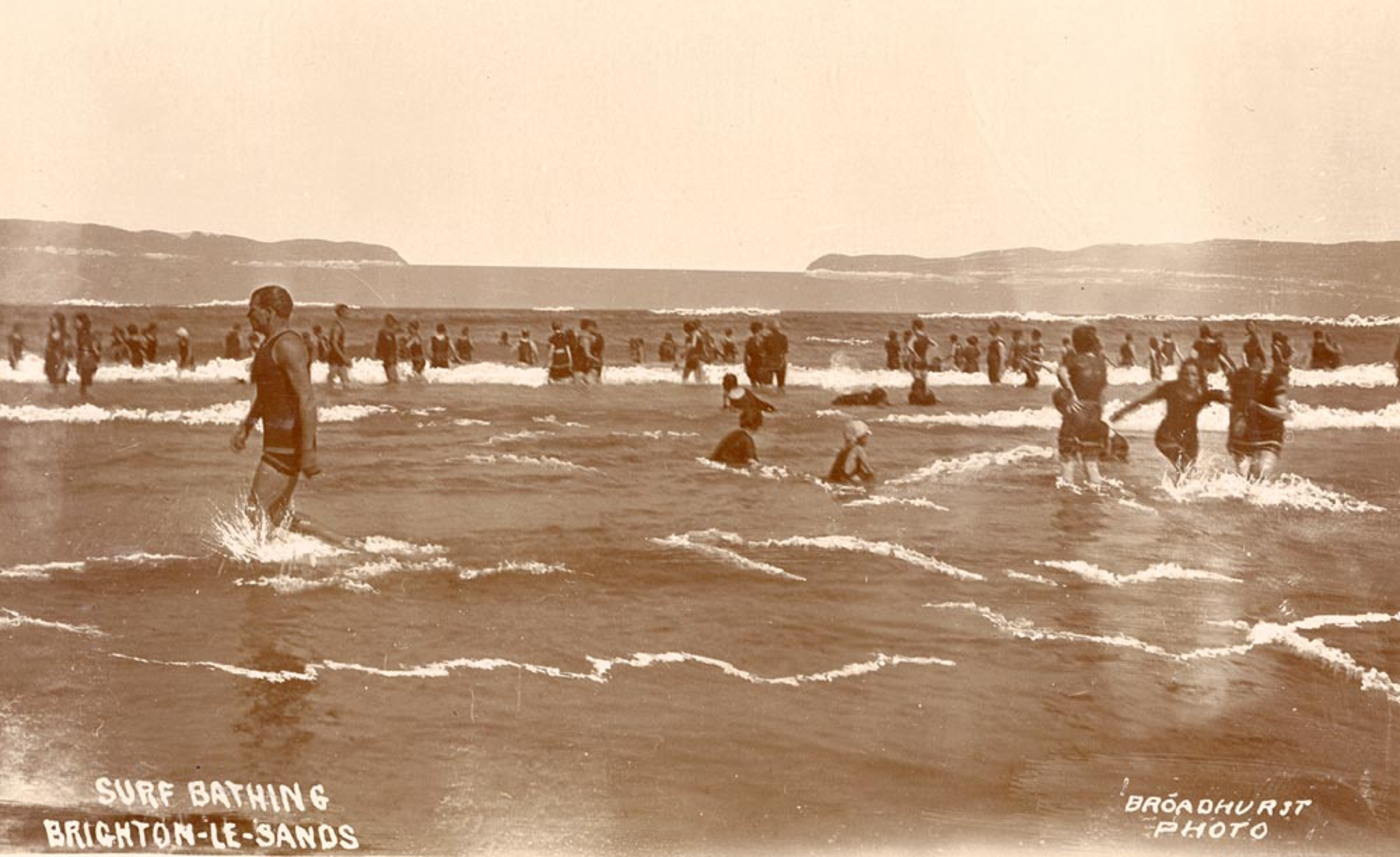
Surf bathing at Brighton-Le-Sands, Australia, early 20th century. Women's swim area.

Mixed bathing is the sharing of a pool, beach or other place by swimmers of both genders. Mixed bathing usually refers to swimming or other water-based recreational activities in public or semi-public facilities, such as hotel or holiday resort pool, in a non-sex segregated environment.

== Ancient times ==
In ancient Rome, mixed bathing at public facilities was prohibited at various periods, while commonplace at others. It is also possible that sex-segregated bathing was the rule at some facilities but not at others.

== Modern times ==
In many parts of the world, mixed bathing was not generally allowed and moral campaigners argued that mixed bathing was immoral or immodest. Women's swimsuits were considered inherently immodest. To avoid the exposure of people in swimsuits, especially to people of the opposite sex, many popular beach resorts were commonly equipped with bathing machines. Legal segregation of beaches ended in Britain in 1901, and the use of the bathing machines declined rapidly. Another measure in the moral campaign was to ban sea bathing altogether or during daylight hours. Australian bathers were only permitted to swim during daylight hours after 1903. Before mixed bathing became culturally accepted from the late-19th century, public bathing, when permitted or practiced at all, was segregated on the basis of gender, using either separate facilities or some form of divide or by allocation of times for use by men and women.

By the 1920s, the public in many Western countries began to flout the ban on mixed bathing in public places such as beaches, and the prohibitions began being repealed. The main objection to the prohibition to mixed bathing was that it prevented families and couples from enjoying the beach together. Following the repeal of bans on mixed bathing, beaches became a popular meeting place and place of recreation, especially for young people, and not necessarily for swimming.

It took longer for pools, including public pools, to permit mixed bathing. For example, when Tooting Bec Lido, an open-air pool in South London, opened in 1906, it was segregated by the sexes, with women and girls permitted to use the pool on one morning a week. Mixed bathing was not introduced until 1931, and then only at specified times. At the same time, an "aerator", or fountain, was added to help pump the water round the pool and keep it clean. The main reason given for this act of modernisation was because more women would be swimming there and higher standards of hygiene were apparently needed. Dulwich Public Baths also in South London allowed mixed bathing in 1946. London's Hampstead Heath has three open-air public swimming ponds; one for men, one for women, and one for mixed bathing. The popularity of the swimming pool at the City Baths in Melbourne, Australia increased with the introduction of mixed bathing in 1947. Until YMCA began to admit females in the early 1960s, young men who used their swimming pools were required to swim in the nude. This was regarded as a sanitary measure. When girls were admitted, the wearing of swimsuits became mandatory. Similarly, in some English schools, Manchester Grammar School for example, nude swimming was compulsory until the 1970s. Swimsuits became mandatory when they started admitting girls. This was also the case for some American high schools and junior high schools and in some summer camps.

Although mixed bathing is commonplace today, this was not always the case, and it continues to be illegal or contentious in some parts of the world. In Muslim countries which are re-imposing sharia law, mixed bathing is being banned. For example, after Hamas took over the Gaza Strip, it closed down the Crazy Water Park, one of the Gaza Strip's most popular entertainment sites, for allowing mixed bathing. Strict Orthodox Jews, Muslims, and fundamentalist Christians in the Southern United States (e.g., Southwide Baptist Fellowship and Methodist denominations that teach the doctrine of outward holiness, such as the Evangelical Wesleyan Church) do not engage in mixed bathing. Many countries have anti-sex discrimination legislation which extend to the provision of sporting and recreational facilities, including private facilities. However, there are usually provisions for exemptions being granted, and exemptions have been granted in some cases for women-only bathing on the basis, for example, of religious and cultural sensitivities.

In Japan, nude mixed bathing was the norm at public baths until the Meiji Restoration when sex segregation was strictly enforced at sentō-type baths.

== See also ==
- Communal shower
- Sex segregation
- Unisex changing rooms
