= Gérard Dagon =

- Born: 4 April 1936; Strasbourg, France
- Died: 22 May 2011 (aged 75); Gandrange, France
- Education: University of Strasbourg
- Occupations: pastor and author
- Church: Protestant Reformed Church of Alsace and Lorraine; Independent Baptist
- Writings: Petites églises de France

Gérard Dagon (4 April 1936, Strasbourg – 22 May 2011, Gandrange) was a French evangelical pastor, teacher, author, publisher and long-time Christian countercultist.

== Early life and education ==
He got a Master of Divinity at the faculty of Protestant theology in the University of Strasbourg.

== Ministry ==
He became pastor of the Protestant Reformed Church of Alsace and Lorraine (EPRAL) in 1959, then directed the Union of Evangelical Churches Chrischona (Union des Églises évangéliques Chrischona). He participated in the creation of the evangelical directory, then became president of the (Fédération évangélique de France) in 1991 for a few years. He founded, alongside others such as Swiss pastor and former member of the ADFI Paul Ranc, the association Vigi-sectes in 1998 who informs about religions and cults from a christian perspective. He published books about religious movements, about pseudo-Christian groups he considered cults because of their supposed biblical errors, and an extensive encyclopedia on Christianity. He listed 150 people who have claimed to be the Messiah from the first century CE. At the end of his ministry, he became pastor of an Independent Baptist church in Moselle.

== Reception ==
In 1998, the pastor of the Reformed Church of Alsace and Lorraine Sylvain Dujancourt accused Dagon of using his anti-cult campaign to attract new people to his church.

Sébastien Fath considered Dagon a "key figure of French evangelical Protestantism since the 1970s", and Émile Poulat qualified him a "pioneer" in the religious issues.

== Main works ==
- Les Sectes en France, 1958
- Petites églises de France, Amneville, six volumes, 1960s-1970s
- Parlons sectes, Barnabas editions, 1991, ISBN 2-908582-04-X
- Panorama de la France Évangélique, Barnabas editions, 1993, ISBN 2-908582-07-4
- Les Sectes à visage découvert : Tome 1 , Yerres : Barnabas editions, 1995, ISBN 2-908582-09-0
- Les Sectes à visage découvert : Tome 2 , Dozulé :Barnabas editions, 1997, ISBN 2-908582-17-1
- Nouvelle Encyclopédie chrétienne, Gandrange, 2005, 1247 p., ISBN 2-9500197-3-0
