= Maze Jackson =

American evangelist (1923–1996)

Maze Jackson (1923–1996) was an American Independent Baptist evangelist, best known as Brother Maze to fellow preachers and friends. Jackson hosted The Truck Driver's Special, a long-running radio series popular among truckers and their families, as well as "believers from border to border and coast to coast". He was also the editor of The Preacher's Goldmine, a sermon and Bible study magazine for ministers. A series of digests from this magazine was published as Golden Nuggets. He also wrote the booklet "Can Mr. Kennedy Be Defeated in 1964?".

Born and raised in Hendersonville, North Carolina, Jackson made his home in Atlanta, Georgia. His wife, known as "Sister Dot," worked with him in his ministry.

Many of Jackson's sermons are available today on the Internet at the Old Time Baptist website of Fredericktown Free Will Baptist Church. Johnny the Baptist's website presents over thirty hours of Jackson's sermons (in RealAudio format), with plans to increase to a hundred hours. Repeats of The Truck Driver's Special continue to air in some American radio markets.
