= Shelton Smith =

American Baptist editor (born 1942)

Shelton L. Smith (born December 4, 1942) is an American preacher, author, and current editor of The Sword of the Lord, a Christian fundamentalist publisher based in Murfreesboro, Tennessee. He is also involved with the Independent Baptist movement.

== History ==
Shelton Smith was a longtime pastor, his longest tenure being at Church of the Open Door/Carroll Christian Schools in Westminster, Maryland, from 1979 to 1995. He received his Master of Theology in Systematic Theology in 1972 and Doctor of Ministry in Practical Theology in 1976 both from Luther Rice Seminary, and he also received his Doctor of Theology from Midwestern Baptist College & Seminary in 2003.

With the passing of Curtis Hutson, Smith became the editor of The Sword of the Lord in April 1995. Smith has continued to lead The Sword with its association with the Independent Baptist movement and continues editing the newspaper as well as preaching in churches around America.

== Books ==
- Autobiography of Ambition—Sword of the Lord Pub (ISBN 0-87398-044-1)
- Battle Over Baptism, The—Sword of the Lord Pub (ISBN 0-87398-099-9)
- Behold the Lamb—Sword of the Lord Pub (ISBN 0-87398-532-X)
- "Do It Again, Lord!"—Sword of the Lord Pub (ISBN 0-87398-185-5)
- Is Everybody Going to Heaven?—Sword of the Lord Pub
- Islam: A Raging Storm—Sword of the Lord Pub (ISBN 0-87398-417-X)
- Jesus Paid It All—Sword of the Lord Pub (ISBN 0-87398-458-7)
- Scriptural Fellowship—Sword of the Lord Pub
- That's My Crowd!—Sword of the Lord Pub (ISBN 0-87398-893-0)
- The Book We Call the Bible—Sword of the Lord Pub
