= The Sword of the Lord =

Christian fundamentalist Baptist biweekly newspaper

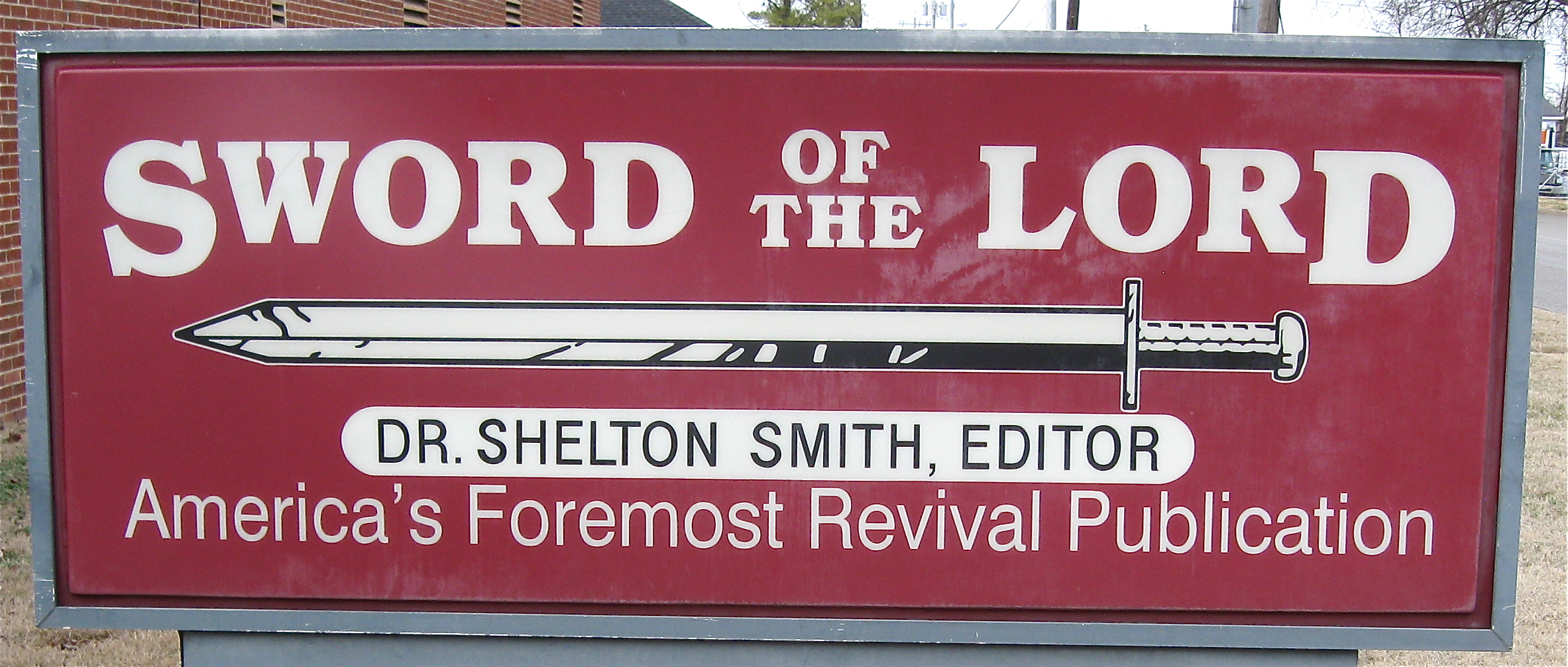
- Type: Bi-monthly newspaper
- Owner: Sword of the Lord Ministries
- Founder: John R. Rice
- Editor: Shelton Smith
- Founded: September 28, 1934
- Headquarters: Murfreesboro, Tennessee
- ISSN: 0039-7547
- Website: www.swordofthelord.com

The Sword of the Lord is a Christian fundamentalist, Independent Baptist bi-monthly 24-page newspaper.

The Sword of the Lord is published by Sword of the Lord Ministries, a non-profit organization based in Murfreesboro, Tennessee, which also publishes religious books, pamphlets, and tracts from a fundamentalist Christian perspective, as Sword of the Lord Publications.

== History ==
The Sword of the Lord was first published on September 28, 1934, in Dallas, Texas by John R. Rice, who edited the publication until his death on December 29, 1980. At first it was simply the four-page paper of Fundamentalist (later, Galilean) Baptist Church of Dallas, where Rice was the pastor. The paper was handed out on the street, and Rice's daughters and other Sunday school children delivered it door-to-door.

Sword of the Lord newspaper

The Sword of the Lord moved with the Rice family to Wheaton, Illinois in 1940, and then to its present location in 1963. Upon the Sword's move to Tennessee, Rice co-edited the paper with his brother Bill (1912-1978) until Bill's death. Curtis Hutson replaced Bill Rice as co-editor, and he became the sole editor two years later when John Rice died. Hutson died in 1995, and editorship passed to Shelton Smith, former pastor of the Church of the Open Door/Carroll Christian Schools, Westminster, Maryland.

The name of the ministry and publication is taken from a phrase in Judges 7:20: "...and they cried, The sword of the Lord, and of Gideon." The verse is featured in the banner, as is the newspaper's stated purpose:

An Independent Christian Publication, Standing for the Verbal Inspiration of the Bible, the Deity of Christ, His Blood Atonement, Salvation by Faith, New Testament Soul Winning and the Premillennial Return of Christ; Opposing Modernism (Liberalism), Worldliness and Formalism.

Family members of the editors often assumed integral roles at The Sword of the Lord. In 2009, the approximately fifty employees of the Sword of the Lord included editor Shelton Smith; his son, Marlon, executive vice president.

== Emphases ==
=== Soul-winning ===
The Sword of the Lord emphasizes soul winning, the belief that Christians should actively seek to convert others to faith in Jesus Christ. It promotes fulfilling the Great Commission by publishing books and materials on the topic as well as sponsoring annual "School of the Prophets" seminars.

=== King James Bible ===
Consistent with the King James Only movement, the Sword of the Lord believes:

the Bible, the Scriptures of the Old Testament and the New Testament, preserved for us in the Masoretic Text (Old Testament), Textus Receptus (New Testament), and in the King James Bible, is verbally and plenarily inspired of God. It is the inspired, inerrant, infallible, and altogether authentic, accurate and authoritative Word of God, therefore the supreme and final authority in all things. (II Tim. 3:16-17; II Peter 1:21; Rev. 22:18-19)."

== Contents ==
For many years The Sword of the Lord has published sermons of contemporary Independent Baptist preachers who are part of its circle. It also publishes sermons from a wider spectrum of evangelicals of past generations (not all of whom were Independent Baptist), including Hyman Appelman, Harry A. Ironside, Bob Jones, Sr., R. A. Torrey, Robert G. Lee, Dwight L. Moody, Billy Sunday, T. De Witt Talmage, and George Truett.

The Sword of the Lord is strongly anti-Calvinist and as such does not publish sermons by Calvinist preachers, although an exception has been made for the noted nineteenth-century Calvinist Charles Spurgeon. Nevertheless, Spurgeon's sermons have been edited to remove Calvinist-leaning passages.

The paper usually includes "Editor's Notes," a column by Smith commenting on his recent travels and upcoming events; "Noteworthy News," brief descriptions of events involving Christians or matters related to Christianity, with occasional editorial commentary; columns on church planting and bus ministries; and advertisements for independent fundamentalist Baptist churches and Bible colleges.
