= Clarence Sexton =

American religious leader (1948–2023)

Clarence Sexton (1948 - 2023) was an American Independent Baptist pastor and prominent figure in Republican politics in Tennessee, alongside being the founder and president of Crown College in Tennessee.

== Life ==
Sexton was born in the state of Alabama, however, he spent his childhood in Blount County, Tennessee. Sexton later became a pastor at the Temple Baptist Church in Powell, Tennessee and founded the Independent Baptist Crown College in 1991, whose graduates have started around 500 churches in the world.

In 1970, when Sexton was only 22 years old, he met Billy Graham, stating that he viewed him very positively. Sexton has worked with the Independent Baptist preacher Lee Roberson and served as an assistant pastor at Highland Park Baptist Church in Chattanooga, Tennessee.

Sexton had two sons, six grandchildren, and two great-grandchildren. He died in 2023 after being sick for a long time. His wife, who co-founded Crown College with him, died a year later in 2024.

Sexton often tried to seek unity within the Independent Baptist movement, creating the Independent Baptist Friends International in 2010.

In 2017, the Temple Baptist Church was involved in a lawsuit, after a truck injured a woman. The lawsuit also named the Temple Baptist Church, claiming ownership of the equipment. However, Sexton denied the ownership of the truck by the church and any involvement.

== Ruckmanism ==
Clarence Sexton was a King James Only Fundamentalist, however he rejected more extreme views of King James Onlyism. In 2005, Sexton invited William P. Grady, a radical proponent of KJV-onlyism, to speak at Temple Baptist Church. During his sermon, Grady called for a revival of Ruckmanism and argued for a break from broader fundamentalism, claiming it did not go far enough. Sexton responded to Grady's remarks by canceling a subsequent speaking engagement for him at the church. In 2010, Grady published a book called "Given by Inspiration" criticizing KJV-only advocates who promote the KJV in public while accepting the Textus Receptus as the higher authority in private.

== Racism allegations ==
Sexton has been the subject of controversy over racism, especially on the issue of the inclusion of a statue of the confederate general Nathan Bedford Forrest, and Sexton's opposition to the Black Lives Matter movement, to which allegations the college stated that they had been misrepresented.
