= KPPS-LP =

- St. Louis Park, Minnesota; United States
- Frequency: 97.5 MHz

Programming
- Format: Variety (currently silent)

Ownership
- Owner: Park Public Radio, Inc.

History
- First air date: 2016

Technical information
- Licensing authority: FCC
- Facility ID: 196131
- Class: L1
- ERP: 100 watts (via an STA)
- HAAT: 13.16 m (43 ft)
- Transmitter coordinates: 44°56′34″N 93°22′57″W

Links
- Public license information: LMS
- Website: parkpublicradio.azurewebsites.net

KPPS-LP (97.5 FM) is a radio station licensed to St. Louis Park, Minnesota, United States and owned by Park Public Radio, Inc.

KPPS-LP has had difficulties maintaining its signal since its inception. In June 2017, KTIS signed on a translator on 97.5 from downtown St. Paul on the same frequency as KPPS-LP, causing interference. The station requested an emergency STA to transmit with 100 watts. Because KPPS-LP had an application to change frequency to 88.9 at the time, the FCC denied KPPS-LP's power increase request. The application to move to 88.9 was later dismissed. However, the station is licensed for 100 watts on a STA as of April 2024.

KPPS-LP also had difficulty finding a suitable transmitter location, proposing several different sites and different frequencies to the FCC, all of which were dismissed.

One of the frequencies proposed by KPPS-LP to use was 97.9, which, up until 2019, was largely vacant in the Twin Cities. The FCC denied its application, instead allowing WCTS to move its translator from Plymouth to the IDS Center in downtown Minneapolis. In August 2024, KPPS-LP dropped its application for 97.9, effectively allowing WCTS's translator to move to the IDS Center.

KPPS-LP left the air on February 7, 2023, the day after the FCC denied PPR’s petition for reconsideration of the dismissal of its application to move to a different transmitter site. In its request for special temporary authority to remain silent, KPPS-LP stated that a harsh winter had caused further deterioration of its transmission system and that the antenna needed to be removed for building repairs.
