= Ernest Pickering =

American fundamentalist Christian pastor and administrator (1928–2000)

Ernest Dinwoodie Pickering (December 14, 1928 – October 16, 2000) was an Independent Baptist fundamentalist Christian pastor, author, college administrator, and mission board representative.

== Life ==
Pickering was born in St. Petersburg, Florida, the oldest son of Ernest Joseph and Evelyn Ida Pickering, officers in the Salvation Army. The family lived and ministered in Florida, Maryland, West Virginia, Alabama, and Texas. Ernest was converted to fundamentalist Christianity as a teenager in Dallas and immediately began to participate in street meetings, including some at which he dodged rocks and tomatoes. He graduated with a B. A. in Bible from Bob Jones University in 1948, when he was nineteen; and he earned his Th.M. and Th.D. degrees from Dallas Theological Seminary in 1952 and 1957 respectively.

In 1952, Pickering married Ariel Yvonne Thomas, whom he had met as an intern pastor in Colorado City, Texas, and the couple shortly moved to New Kensington, Pennsylvania, where Pickering pastored Maranatha Bible Church.

After completing his doctorate, Pickering served for two years as the National Executive Secretary for the Independent Fundamental Churches of America (IFCA) and edited its publication, The Voice. In 1959 he became pastor of Woodcrest Baptist Church in Fridley, Minnesota, and served as Dean of Central Baptist Theological Seminary of Minneapolis until 1965. Simultaneously he served on the board of trustees for Pillsbury Baptist Bible College and was a founder of Baptist World Mission. From 1965 until 1969, Pickering pastored the Bible Baptist Church of Kokomo, Indiana, became a leader in the General Association of Regular Baptist Churches, and wrote adult Sunday School lessons for Regular Baptist Press. In 1969 he joined the faculty of Baptist Bible College & Seminary, Clarks Summit, Pennsylvania and served as Dean. The following year, he succeeded G. Arthur Woolsey as president and served in that position for eight years, from 1970 to 1978.

In 1978, Pickering assumed the pastorate of the Emmanuel Baptist Church, Toledo, Ohio, which had a regular attendance of 2000, but whose previous pastor had suddenly left after a moral failure. Pickering provided the leadership to stabilize the congregation.

In 1986 Pickering became president of Northwest Baptist Seminary, Tacoma, Washington, but following a disagreement over what its board of trustees considered an overly strict position on ecclesiastical separation, Pickering resigned in 1987. For a year he returned to Baptist Bible Seminary as professor of theology, and in 1988, he moved to the pastorate of the fundamentalist Fourth Baptist Church, Minneapolis, Minnesota, the home of Central Baptist Theological Seminary—of which Pickering also assumed the presidency.

In 1993 Pickering was named "Alumnus of the Year" by Bob Jones University. The same year he joined the Baptist World Mission, serving as Deputation Director from 1993 to 1996, and field representative from 1996 until his death in 2000.

In 1983 Pickering was diagnosed with cancer in the frontal sinuses near his brain. After he experienced a recurrence in 1996, the radiation used to treat the cancer caused him to become totally blind on November 8, 1996. Assisted by his wife, Pickering continued to preach without notes until the progress of the disease made continuation of his ministry impossible. Pickering wrote his final booklet, Our Tear-Washed Eyes: Why Does God Allow His People to Suffer? after he had lost his sight.

== Doctrinal views ==
=== The study of theology ===
Ernest Pickering strongly opposed the trend among some Christians to downplay the significance of theology. He argued that the Bible itself emphasizes the importance of studying theology, noting that even the Lord's Prayer contains numerous theological affirmations. Pickering asserted that theological ignorance among Evangelicals often leads to erroneous beliefs, such as the denial of the eternal Sonship of Christ, salvation by faith alone, or the inerrancy and sufficiency of Scripture.

=== Free Grace theology ===
As proponent of Free Grace theology, Ernest Pickering rejected Lordship salvation, which he viewed as a distortion of the gospel. He interpreted the Greek term metanoia (repentance) not as a call to a life of commitment but as a simple change of mind—specifically, a shift from unbelief to belief in Christ. Pickering maintained that while true Christians might fail to live in consistent obedience, such failures would result in the loss of eternal rewards rather than salvation. He distinguished clearly between salvation, which is by grace through faith alone, and discipleship, which involves a deeper commitment.

=== Nondenominationalism ===
Pickering criticized the trend among some Baptists to abandon their denominational label in favor of nondenominational identities. While he acknowledged that many true Christians exist outside Fundamentalist Baptist circles and he rejected Baptist Brider theology, he warned that discarding the Baptist name often signals a weakening of Baptist convictions. He argued that such actions harm cooperation among Baptist, fundamentalist, and separatist churches and risk fostering ecumenical compromises. Pickering urged Baptists to retain their distinct identity to uphold their theological and ecclesiastical principles.

=== Neo-evangelicalism ===
Pickering criticized the ecumenical neo-evangelicalism of Billy Graham in print from 1957, and his chief contribution to twentieth-century evangelical Christianity was as a Baptist theoretician of separatist fundamentalism.

=== Contemporary Christian music ===
Pickering strongly opposed the use of Contemporary Christian Music (CCM) in worship, arguing that styles such as rock music are overly emotional, entertainment-focused, and man-centered, making them unsuitable for church worship. He believed that proper worship music should be intellectually engaging and instructional, pointing Christians toward doctrinal truth rather than personal feelings. According to Pickering, biblical principles guide Christians to use hymns rather than CCM, which he felt lacked the reverence and theological depth appropriate for worship.

== Books ==
- Theology of Evangelism (Clarks Summit, PA: Baptist Bible College Press, 1974)
- Glories of the Lamb as Seen in the Book of Revelation (Clarks Summit, PA: Baptist Bible College Press, 1978)
- Biblical Separation: The Struggle for a Pure Church (Schaumburg, Illinois: Regular Baptist Press, 1979)
- Charismatic Confusion (Schaumburg, Illinois: Regular Baptist Press, 1980)
- Rejoicing in Christ (Schaumburg, Illinois: Regular Baptist Press, 1980)
- Thou Art the Christ: Studies in Philippians (Schaumburg, Illinois: Regular Baptist Press, 1983)
- For the Hurting Pastor—And Those Who Hurt Him (Schaumburg, Illinois: Regular Baptist Press, 1987)
- The Tragedy of Compromise: The Origin and Impact of the New Evangelicalism (Greenville, SC: BJU Press, 1994)
- Lordship Salvation: An Examination of John MacArthur's Book, The Gospel According to Jesus (Decatur, AL: Baptist World Mission, 1988)
- Should We Ever Separate From Christian Brethren? (Decatur, AL: Baptist World Mission.)

Academic offices
Preceded by Douglas R. McLachlan	President of the Central Baptist Theological Seminary of Minneapolis; 1988-1993	Succeeded by Douglas R. McLachlan
