= Detroit Baptist Theological Seminary =

Independent Baptist seminary

Coordinates: 42°16′01.4″N 83°11′56.1″W

Detroit Baptist Theological Seminary is an independent Baptist seminary in Allen Park, Michigan, operated in association with the Inter-City Baptist Church in Allen Park. The institution, which was established in 1976, enrolls men for graduate programs in preaching and pastoral theology, leading to the Master of Divinity (M.Div) and Master of Theology (Th.M.) degrees.

== History ==
The school was opened in September 1976 as Detroit Baptist Divinity School, with an initial enrollment of 30 students. In 1979 the institution applied to the Michigan Department of Education for legal authorization to grant the M.Div and Th.M. degrees. The authorization was granted in March 1980 following state evaluation. The institution then changed its name to Detroit Baptist Theological Seminary and began awarding degrees in 1980. The institution's founder, Dr. William R. Rice, served as its head until his retirement in 1989, when he was succeeded by Dr. David M. Doran.

== Affiliations and approvals ==
DBTS does not claim affiliation with any accreditation organization. The Michigan Department of Labor & Economic Growth lists DBTS in its directory of institutions of higher education operating in accordance with applicable state laws and conducting programs leading to a degree. Maranatha Baptist University identifies DBTS as one of the two "recognized Baptist seminaries" (the other is Central Baptist Theological Seminary in Plymouth, Minnesota, and Virginia Beach, Virginia) whose graduates will be considered for faculty positions even though the institutions are not accredited by an accreditation organization belonging to the Council on Higher Education Accreditation.

== Religious doctrine and educational philosophy ==
DBTS describes itself as "unashamedly Baptist," holding to a dispensational approach to the Bible and thus premillennial and pretribulational in eschatology. Additionally, it "is biblicist in theology and stands opposed to and engages in refutation of the charismatic movement, Arminianism, and hyper-Calvinism."

The institution treats the original manuscripts of the Bible as the inerrant Word of God, a position that places it in opposition to the King-James-Only Movement. King-James-Only adherents have criticized DBTS (together with Bob Jones University and other institutions, including Central Baptist Theological Seminary) for playing an influential role in convincing some Independent Baptist groups to adopt modern Bible translations.

The Institute for Creation Research lists DBTS as a "creationist college" that subscribes to the position that "God created all life forms according to the literal interpretation of the Biblical record (six-day creation, recent global flood)."

== Program ==
The DBTS program emphasizes expository preaching based on study of the Bible in the original languages. Accordingly, all degree candidates study Hebrew and Greek in addition to exegesis, Bible exposition, expository preaching, church history, Baptist history, pastoral theology, and church administration. Classes are conducted in a traditional on-campus setting; no classes are available by distance education. All students are encouraged to engage in a weekly ministry in a local church.

In keeping with the belief that "God ordained men to provide the spiritual leadership of the church in the preaching/pastoral function," the seminary does not award degrees to women, but does enroll women interested in taking courses for personal enrichment or vocational development. Also, DBTS Seminary Wives' Institute offers the wives of current or former DBTS students a two-year series of weekly instructional sessions so they can ably assist their husbands in ministry

== Faculty ==
According to DBTS, all nine members of the faculty hold earned doctoral degrees. Dr. David M. Doran, a graduate of Bob Jones University who also holds two master's degrees from Detroit Baptist Theological Seminary and a D.Min. degree from Trinity Evangelical Divinity School, is pastor of the Inter-City Baptist Church and president of Detroit Baptist Theological Seminary. Benjamin Edwards is the Dean. Rolland D. McCune was formerly professor of systematic theology and president of DBTS.

== Library ==
The DBTS library collection consists primarily of works relating to biblical interpretation and exegesis, theology, church history, and practical theology, including more than 40,000 monographs, reference works, dissertations, and bound volumes of periodicals. As of 2007, the library was stated to have subscriptions to about 270 print periodicals and about 100 electronic journals.

== Publications and outreach ==
Since 1996 the seminary has published the Detroit Baptist Seminary Journal, presenting scholarly articles based on biblical truths. The journal is issued annually. The complete electronic text of the journal was selected for inclusion in The Theological Journal Library, published on CD-ROM by Galaxie Software. DBTS also hosts the annual Mid-America Conference on Preaching and the annual William R. Rice Lecture Series, which features presentations on current issues in Christianity. DBTS also is credited as the developer of a widely disseminated tract entitled The Bridge to Eternal Life.

== Alumni ==
Graduates and former students of DBTS are well represented in the ministry and as faculty members of bible colleges and seminaries. Alumni include:

- Daniel K. Davey, President and Professor of Practical Theology, Central Baptist Theological Seminary of Virginia Beach, and Senior Pastor, Colonial Baptist Church, Virginia Beach, Virginia
- Stephen Davey, Founder and Senior Pastor, The Shepherd's Church, and President of Shepherds Theological Seminary, Cary, North Carolina
- David M. Doran, President and Professor of Pastoral Theology, Detroit Baptist Theological Seminary, and Senior Pastor, Inter-City Baptist Church
