= Mordecai Ham =

American evangelist preacher (1877–1961)

- Born: Mordecai Fowler Ham Jr. April 2, 1877; Allen County, Kentucky, U.S.
- Died: November 1, 1961 (aged 84); Louisville, Kentucky, U.S.
- Education: Ogden College
- Occupation: Evangelist
- Spouses: Bessie Simmons (m. 1900; died 1905) Annie Laurie Smith (m. 1907)
- Children: 3

Mordecai Fowler Ham Jr. (April 2, 1877 – November 1, 1961), was an American Independent Baptist evangelist, a Christian fundamentalist and temperance movement leader. He entered the ministry in 1901 and in 1936 began his long radio evangelistic career. He evangelized until shortly before his death in 1961. Ham was the son of Tobias and Ollie (née McElroy). He was born on a farm in Allen County, Kentucky near Scottsville, Kentucky. The primary target of his sermons was the drinking of alcohol, which he disdained.

Mordecai Ham was an ally of the Baptist preacher J. Frank Norris, who was expelled from the Southern Baptist Convention.

== Association with Billy Graham ==
The well-known American evangelist Billy Graham describes his conversion as happening when attending a meeting of Mordecai Ham, especially noting his usage of Romans 5:8 in the King James version.

== Racism and antisemitic conspiracy theories ==
Ham had a reputation for racism and antisemitic conspiracy theories. He believed and preached on various topics based on classical antisemitic canards such as believing Jews had special access to political power and influence and that they represent a subversive social force. The targets for his preaching were often "nebulous rings of Jewish, Catholic or Black conspirators plotting to destroy white Protestant America." In 1926 W.O. Saunders, a newspaper editor in Elizabeth City, North Carolina, confronted Ham for defaming a prominent Jew during an evangelistic campaign. Ham had accused the President of Sears, Roebuck & Company in Chicago, Julius Rosenwald, of operating inter-racial prostitution rings in Chicago that exploited white women. Saunders wrote an account of the accusations Ham had made and how Saunders had proved them false called "The Book of Ham." The book was widely distributed, describing instances of Ham's negative views towards Jews. Ham believed in the ideas of British Israelism, that the white Anglo-Saxon races had been chosen by God. Ham outlined this in a piece of writing called "the Need of the Anglo-Israel Truth" that is featured on some websites of the Identity Movement.

However, in his booklet "The Jew" he stated unequally, "though the sins of the Jew have been many and great, yet vengeance belongeth to the Lord, and He will not let you escape if you have hated, or do hate the Jew. Are you a Christian? No Christian will hate the Jew. Through him came the Christ and your Bible. The best, the greatest and the only perfect man who ever lived on earth was a Jew by race."

== Works ==
- The Second Coming of Christ and Revelation
- Believing a Lie
- Light on the Dance
- The Jews
- The Need of the Anglo – Israel Truth
- The Sabbath Question

Ham received an honorary degree from Bob Jones University in Greenville, South Carolina.
