= Curtis Hutson (pastor) =

American pastor (1934–1995)

Curtis Hutson (July 10, 1934 – March 5, 1995) was an Independent Fundamental Baptist pastor, academic administrator, and editor. He was the president of the now defunct Baptist University of America and the editor of The Sword of the Lord.

== Life ==
Curtis Hutson was born in Decatur, Georgia, to a barber and hair dresser, the second of five children. He attended Avondale High School where he met his future wife, Barbara (Gerri) Crawford. They began dating after graduation while Hutson was working at Scottdale Textile Mill. They married in 1952 and had four children: Sherry, Donna, Kay, and Dr. Tony Hutson.

While working as a mail carrier, Hutson preached at church services and revivals in the Atlanta area. In 1956 he conducted a revival at the tiny Forrest Hills Baptist Church of Scottdale. By the end of the week, Hutson had filled the fifty seats in the church, the pastor had resigned, and Hutson was called to replace him. Although he had no formal training, Hutson served as pastor while continuing to work for the post office.

In 1961, Hutson heard Jack Hyles, Tom Malone and John R. Rice preach at nearby Antioch Baptist Church. During that Sword of the Lord conference, Hyles gave a two-hour soul-winning lecture. Hutson was convicted that he too should aggressively win the lost to Christ. The following Saturday he led three people to the Lord. "Every week thereafter for a number of years he led someone to Christ." He began to preach about soul winning, and his congregation began to follow his example. In 1967 Hutson quit the post office to become a full-time pastor—at first for a salary of $75 a month. Between 1969 and 1972, the church grew from 350 to 2,300 members. In 1976, when Hutson resigned after 20 years of pastoring, church membership was 7,900.

Entering full-time evangelism, Hutson held area-wide evangelistic meetings from 1977 to 1980. From 1974 to 1980, he also served as president of the now defunct Baptist University of America near Atlanta. Hutson was gifted in using humor to engage an audience, and he memorized one-liners and funny stories topically so that he would have a collection of ready jokes on any subject.

In 1978, John R. Rice invited Hutson to become the associate editor of the fundamentalist newspaper The Sword of the Lord based in Murfreesboro, Tennessee. Two years later, Rice died and Hutson became editor. He served in this position for the remainder of his life while continuing to preach in churches across America.

In 1992 Hutson was diagnosed with prostate cancer, from which he died in March 1995. Shelton Smith became his successor at The Sword of the Lord.

== Beliefs ==
Curtis Hutson rejected Lordship salvation, and just like Jack Hyles, he taught that repentance is a mere change of mind concerning Christ, not an abandonment of sin, viewing faith and repentance as synonyms. This view is associated with other Free Grace theologians like Lewis Sperry Chafer and Charles C. Ryrie.

Curtis Hutson was highly critical of Calvinism, arguing that all five points of Calvinism are unbiblical. He even rejected the perseverance of the saints, arguing that even though Christians are eternally secure, this does not mean that all Christians will persevere.

== Works ==
- Bread for Believers (ISBN 0-87398-082-4)
- Building and Battling (ISBN 0-87398-068-9)
- Death So Soon, Heaven So Real (ISBN 0-87398-189-8)
- Ingredients of a Great Church (ISBN 0-87398-404-8)
- Punch Lines (ISBN 0-87398-665-2)
- Salvation Crystal Clear (ISBN 0-87398-795-0)
- Some Things I've Learned (ISBN 0-87398-765-9)
- Twelve Chosen Men Who Changed the World (ISBN 0-87398-027-1)
- Winning Souls and Getting Them Down the Aisle (ISBN 0-87398-928-7)
- Why I Disagree with All Five Points of Calvinism (ISBN 0-87398-931-7)

All of Hutson's books and pamphlets were published by Sword of the Lord Publishers.
