= Baptist International Missions, Inc. =

Missionary organization

Baptist International Missions, Incorporated (BIMI) is a missions organization that provides aid to Independent Baptist missionaries.

BIMI was founded in 1917 by Anton and Viola Andersen.

In the late 1950s, the work focused on what was then known as the Belgian Congo (now the Democratic Republic of the Congo); in the 2020s, the organization works on church planting around the world.

BIMI is based in Tennessee, US; in 2023, the president was David Snyder.
