= Baptist University of America =

Baptist University of America was a private Baptist Christian university located in Decatur, Georgia near Atlanta. It was made up of a merger of five separate seminaries. It was closed in May 1987.

== History ==
In 1965, Pastor Al Janney began offering college classes. In 1971, he incorporated Baptist University of America, which the classes became part of. Temple Heights Christian College (founded in 1973 by the pastor of Temple Heights Baptist Church), Tallahassee Christian College (founded in 1974 by the pastor of Temple Baptist Church), Regency Baptist College (founded in 1974 by the pastor of Regency Baptist Church), and University Baptist College (founded in 1974 by the pastor of University Baptist Church) merged with Baptist University of America in 1974 and retained the Baptist University of America name. The pastors of Forrest Hills Baptist Church in Decatur, Georgia and Bible Baptist Church in Savannah, Georgia also supported the new organization. Tampa was used as the campus in the spring of 1974, but it was moved to an Atlanta campus in December of that year.

== Closure ==
Baptist University of America was closed in May 1987.

== Notable presidents ==
- Pastor Al Janney (also founded Dade Christian School and New Testament Baptist Church in South Florida) - 1965–1974
- Curtis Hutson - 1974–1978
- Cecil “the Diesel” Hodges - 1978–1983
- ”Panama” Jack Baskin 1983–1987

== Notable alumni ==
Daniel Lawrence Whitney (better known by his stage name, Larry the Cable Guy) attended for three years, dropping out after his junior year to pursue a career in stand-up comedy.
