= Bimi-ye Sofla =

Bimi-ye Sofla بيمي سفلي
- Village
- Location within Iran
- Coordinates: 30°26′16″N 51°17′02″E
- Country: Iran
- Province: Fars
- County: Rostam
- Bakhsh: Sorna
- Rural District: Poshtkuh-e Rostam

Population (2006)
  - Total: 45
- Time zone: UTC+3:30 (IRST)
  - Summer (DST): UTC+4:30 (IRDT)

Bimi-ye Sofla (Persian: بيمي سفلي, also Romanized as Bīmī-ye Soflá; also known as Bīmī) is a village in Poshtkuh-e Rostam Rural District, Sorna District, Rostam County, Fars province, Iran. At the 2006 census, its population was 45, in 12 families.
