= Crown College (Tennessee) =

Baptist Bible college and seminary in Powell, Tennessee

Crown College of the Bible
- Motto: "Take the High Road"
- Type: Private Christian
- Established: 1991
- Endowment: $1.8 billion
- President: Clarence Sexton (until 2023)
- Location: 2307 W Beaver Creek Dr., Powell, Tennessee, USA; 36.0232°N 84.0294°W
- Campus: 240 acres (0.97 km^{2})
- Website: TheCrownCollege.edu

Crown College is an independent Baptist Bible college, featuring a trade school, seminary, language school, and music conservatory in Powell, Tennessee.

== History ==
Clarence Sexton founded Crown College in 1991. The faculty and students of Crown College agree to uphold the Crown Code, Crown's philosophy of education, and their statement of faith, all of which are based on the college's interpretation of the Bible.

Crown College is nationally accredited by the Transnational Association of Christian Colleges and Schools. Crown College is also authorized for operation as a postsecondary educational institution by the Tennessee Higher Education Commission.

Crown College is home to the Crown Christian Heritage Center. This center encompasses 30,000 sq. ft. within the main campus and includes hundreds of displays highlighting the lives of Christian men and women who contributed greatly to the cause of Christ.

In 2021, college president Clarence Sexton announced his intention to display controversial statues on the college campus, including those of Nathan Bedford Forrest, the former leader of the Ku Klux Klan who enslaved Black Americans and killed Union soldiers during the Civil War. However, after a Change.org petition received over 40,000 supporters to "Stop Memorial to KKK Leaders at Crown College of the Bible," Sexton did not proceed with installing the controversial statues, and issued a statement regarding the petition.

== Academics ==
The college offers the Bachelor of Biblical Studies degree, with concentrations in pastoral ministry, youth ministry, missions, music ministry, Christian education, business, trades and technology, a Christian Life Certificate, and opportunities for individual study through online programs, the school of International Language Navigators, and the Crown Music Conservatory. The Crown Seminary offers the M.C.E., M.S.M., M.Min., M.B.S., and M.Div. degrees. The college also has an auxiliary campus in Birmingham, England.

== Student life ==
The main campus in Powell was formerly a Levi Strauss manufacturing plant that was extensively renovated for use as a college. Located on this campus are classrooms, the Crown Bookshop, the Crown Music Conservatory, the Lee Roberson Christian Heritage Center, the Great Hall dining area, and the campus library. Student housing is available on the campus of Temple Baptist Church and at the North Campus.

The Crown College is a member of the United States Collegiate Athletic Association (USCAA) Division II, and fields teams in men's basketball, men's soccer, and women's volleyball. The Crown College Choir has performed across the United States and the United Kingdom.

The Crown College is affiliated with three summer camps: Mount Moriah Christian Camp in Powell, TN, Lake Texoma Baptist Youth Camp in Pottsboro, TX, and Camp Victory near Birmingham, England.

== Crown Christian Publications ==
Crown Christian Publications is based in The Crown College, and is a ministry of Temple Baptist Church in Powell. Crown Christian Publications is a small publisher that specializes in books on Christian living and devotionals. Many of the books are written by the college's president, Clarence Sexton.
