= Eugen Bauder =

German model and actor (born 1986)

- Born: Eugen Bauder; 5 March 1986 (age 40); Almaty, Kazakh S.S.R, Soviet Union
- Modeling information
- Height: 6 ft (1.83 m)
- Hair color: Brown
- Eye color: Blue Green
- Website: http://www.eugen-bauder.com

Eugen Bauder (born 5 March 1986) is a German model and actor.

== Early life ==
Bauder was born in Almaty, Kazakhstan on 5 March 1986. He moved to Germany at the age of five with his mother. He has lived in various locations around Germany. After high school, he went to technical school in Binzen in Baden.

== Career ==
Bauder has worked for major fashion houses such as Hugo Boss, DSquared², Calvin Klein, Jean Paul Gaultier and Armani. He is the current face of Cacharel's "Amor Pour Homme" fragrance.

There has been much speculation on the Internet amongst people in the fashion industry as they're under the impression that he has stopped working. Bauder seems to have turned his eyes elsewhere and has been working with the German agency Actors Connection jump starting an acting career.
