= Oliver B. Greene =

American minister

- Oliver B. Greene (1967)
- Born: Oliver B. Greene; February 14, 1915; Greenville, South Carolina, U.S.
- Died: July 26, 1976 (aged 61)
- Occupation: Evangelist
- Website: TheGospelHour.org

Oliver Boyce Greene (February 14, 1915 – July 26, 1976) was an American Independent Fundamental Baptist evangelist and author. He was saved on September 9, 1935, at the age of 20. Greene was ordained as a Baptist minister at Morgan Memorial Baptist Church in Greenville, South Carolina on July 24, 1939. Over 200,000 confessions of faith were recorded as a result of his ministry. He attended North Greenville Baptist College briefly before entering full-time ministry, conducting revival meetings in tents and in churches across the eastern United States from 1939 to 1968.

== Ministry ==
On October 8, 1956, he founded The Gospel Hour, Inc. as a Christian outreach ministry using radio, personal appearances, books and audio tapes. The radio program of his preaching was called "The Gospel Hour", which began on one station in Georgia and gradually became syndicated until the point it spanned the nation. The Gospel Hour was heard on 150 stations at the time of his death. Taped copies of the program are still aired today on the Fundamental Broadcasting Network and several other Christian radio stations including Caribbean Radio Lighthouse in St. John's, Antigua and Barbuda and the ministry's website.

He wrote over 100 books and brief booklets about the Bible.

== Death ==
Greene died of a cardiac aneurysm on July 26, 1976.

== Personal life ==
Oliver B. Greene was married on September 10, 1939, to Aileen Hazel Collins Greene. They had three sons, Oliver Boyce Jr., Thomas and David.

== Writing ==
- From Disgrace to Grace: The Story of the Black Sheep of a Respectable Family (1959)
- Commentary on Galatians (1962)
- The Epistle of Paul the Apostle to the Romans (1962)
- The Epistle of Paul the Apostle to the Galatians (1962)
- The Epistle of Paul the Apostle to the Ephesians (1963)
- The Epistle of Paul the Apostle to the Colossians (1963)
- The Revelation: verse by verse study (1963)
- Evangelistic Messages (1964)
- Gospel Hour Sermons (1964)
- The Epistles of Paul The Apostle to Timothy and Titus (1964)
- The Epistles of Paul the Apostle to the Thessalonians (1964)
- The Epistle of Paul the Apostle to the Hebrews (1965)
- The Epistle of Paul the Apostle to the Philippians (1965)
- The Gospel of Grace As Revealed to the Apostle Paul (1965)
- What Think Ye of Christ?: And other sermons (1965)
- Our Great Salvation and Other Sermons (1965)
- The Gospel According to John, Volume 2 (1966)
- The Epistles of John (1966)
- Daniel: verse by verse study (1966)
- The New Birth (1966)
- The Face of Jesus and Other Sermons (1966)
- The Greatest Question (1966)
- Timely Messages on Salvation and The Christian Life (1967)
- Heaven
- James ...Servant of God
- The Atonement Of Christ
- Bible Truth (1968)
- The Acts of the Apostles (1968)
- The Gospel According to John : Volume III (1968)
- Hell (1969)
- Our Saviour;: The work of our Saviour: past, present, future (1969)
- Seven Voices Around The Cross and Other Sermons (1969)
- Bible Prophecy (1970)
- Believe and Be Saved (1970)
- Salvation Sermons (1970)
- Behold the Man and Other Sermons (1970)
- By Grace and Other Sermons (1970)
- The Greatest Miracle Since The virgin Birth of Jesus and Other Sermons (1970)
- The Second Coming of Jesus (1971)
- The Word Above All (1971)
- The Gospel According to Matthew (1972)
- The Revelation, Verse By Verse Study (1973)
- Christ Our Sufficiency (1973)
- Three Men Who Witnessed and Walked Away From Calvary (1974)
- The Acts of the Apostles Volume 4 (1975)
- The Gospel According to Matthew (1976)
