= Kevin T. Bauder =

American theologian

Kevin T. Bauder

Kevin T. Bauder is a Baptist theologian. From 2003–2011 Bauder was president of Central Baptist Theological Seminary of Minneapolis. Since 2011, he has been Research Professor of Systematic Theology at the seminary.

Bauder was born in Midland, Michigan. Bauder received a Bachelor of Arts from Faith Baptist Bible College, a Master of Divinity and Master of Theology from the now defunct Denver Baptist Bible College and Seminary, a Doctor of Ministry in 1991 from Trinity Evangelical Divinity School. and a Doctor of Philosophy in Systematic and Historical Theology from Dallas Theological Seminary in 2001.

Bauder joined the faculty of Central Baptist Theological Seminary of Minneapolis in 1998.

In 2006, the COO of Every Tribe Entertainment reported to the Federal Bureau of Investigation a blog posting Bauder wrote. Bauder had been critical of the casting of Chad Allen in the production company's film End of the Spear because Allen is gay. No wrong-doing was found on Bauder's part.
