= Central Baptist Theological Seminary of Minneapolis =

- Type: Fundamentalist Christian Seminary
- Established: September 11, 1956
- Affiliations: Independent Baptist
- President: Dr. Matt Morrell
- Location: 900 Forestview Ln N Plymouth MN 55441, Plymouth, Minnesota, United States; 44°59′18″N 93°25′36″W
- Website: http://www.centralseminary.edu

Central Baptist Theological Seminary of Minneapolis is an Independent Baptist seminary in Plymouth, Minnesota. The seminary moved from Minneapolis to its present location in 1996.

== Accreditation ==
Central Baptist Theological Seminary of Minneapolis is accredited by the Transnational Association of Christian Colleges and Schools. It is also accredited by the Association of Theological Schools in the United States and Canada.

== History ==
Central Baptist Theological Seminary of Minneapolis officially held its first class on September 11, 1956, with a group of thirty-one students from ten states and a faculty of seven. Richard V. Clearwaters, pastor of the Fourth Baptist Church of Minneapolis where the seminary was housed, was the first president.

=== Presidents ===
Douglas R. McLachlan succeeded Clearwaters as pastor of Fourth Baptist Church in 1982 and became the second president of the seminary during the 1986–87 academic year. In 1988, McLachlan was succeeded by Ernest Pickering as president of Central Baptist Theological Seminary and pastor of Fourth Baptist Church. In 1993, after Pickering left for another position, McLachlan returned to become Fourth Baptist Church's pastor and the seminary's president.

In May 2003, Kevin T. Bauder became full-time president of Central Baptist Theological Seminary. Samuel E. Horn succeeded Bauder on July 1, 2011. Horn left in October 2014 for a position elsewhere. In 2014, Matt Morrell, pastor of Fourth Baptist Church, was named the seminary's president taking office in January 2015.

== See also ==
- WCTS
