= List of Bob Jones University people =

Alumni, faculty members, and honorary degree recipients of Bob Jones University

This is a list of notable people associated with Bob Jones University, located in the American city of Greenville, South Carolina.

== Notable graduates ==
- Michael P. V. Barrett, academic dean, Puritan Reformed Theological Seminary (former president, Geneva Reformed Seminary)
- Cliff Barrows, long-time music and program director for the Billy Graham Evangelistic Association
- Matt Baumgardner, artist
- Ernest T. Campbell, senior pastor, Riverside Church, 1968–1976
- Alan Cropsey, Michigan state senator
- Gordon Denlinger, Pennsylvania state representative
- Matthew Diffee, New Yorker cartoonist
- Raymond Bryan Dillard, Old Testament scholar
- Ed Dobson, associate of Jerry Falwell, pastor, evangelical author
- Stuart Epperson, co-founder and chairman of Salem Communications and a member of the conservative Council for National Policy
- Dan Forrest, composer
- Chad Frye, cartoonist and illustrator
- Mark M. Gillen, Pennsylvania state representative
- David Gustafson, judge, United States Tax Court
- Dan Hamilton, member of South Carolina House of Representatives
- Ron Hamilton, composer, singer, and writer of the Patch the Pirate series for Majesty Music
- Terry Haskins, speaker pro tempore, South Carolina House of Representatives
- Ken Hay, founder of The Wilds Christian camps
- Dayton Hobbs, pastor, pioneer Christian school administrator, putative inventor of Tee Ball
- Arlin Horton, founder of Pensacola Christian College, Pensacola, Florida
- Rand Hummel, director of The Wilds of New England
- Asa Hutchinson, former U.S. representative and under-secretary for Border & Transportation Security, Department of Homeland Security, 46th governor of Arkansas
- Tim Hutchinson, pastor, former U.S. representative and U.S. senator from Arkansas
- Homer Kent, New Testament scholar, former president of Grace Theological Seminary
- Billy Kim, past president, Baptist World Alliance
- Tim LaHaye, best-selling author of eschatological fiction
- Eugene Merrill, Distinguished Professor Emeritus of Old Testament Studies, Dallas Theological Seminary; past president of Evangelical Theological Society
- Virginia Mollenkott, specialist in feminist theology and lesbian, gay, bisexual and transgender theology
- Adam Morgan, composer, member of South Carolina House of Representatives
- Alan Morgan, member of South Carolina House of Representatives
- Wendy Nanney, member of South Carolina House of Representatives
- Les Ollila, evangelist, second president of Northland Baptist Bible College
- Rhonda Paisley, artist, author; former Ulster politician; daughter of Ian Paisley
- Monroe Parker, evangelist
- James R. Payton, church historian
- Steve Pettit, evangelist, fifth president of BJU
- Ernest Pickering, pastor; author; president of Baptist Bible College, Clarks Summit, Pennsylvania, and Central Baptist Theological Seminary, Minnesota
- Robert L. Reymond, Reformed theologian and author
- Haddon Robinson, president of Denver Seminary and Gordon-Conwell Theological Seminary
- Sam Rohrer, Pennsylvania state representative
- Peter Ruckman, Baptist minister, writer, and founder of Pensacola Baptist Institute; leading proponent of one of the most extreme "KJV-only" positions; outspoken critic of BJU
- Joel Salatin, organic farmer and author; owner of Polyface Farm, featured in Michael Pollan's Omnivore's Dilemma
- Moisés Silva, authority on biblical hermeneutics; past president of the Evangelical Theological Society
- Ryan Silvey, member, Missouri House of Representatives
- Bryan Simonaire, Maryland state senator
- Richard Stratton, former president, Clearwater Christian College, Clearwater, Florida
- Paul E. Toms, president, National Association of Evangelicals, chairman of World Relief
- Danny Verdin, South Carolina state senator
- Ellen Weaver, South Carolina superintendent of education
- Robert E. Webber, theologian, author of more than 40 books on worship, liturgy, and the early church

== Notable faculty and staff ==
- Carl Blair (1932–2018), painter and sculptor
- Emery Bopp (1924–2007), painter and sculptor; chair, Division of Art, 1953-92
- Walter Fremont (1924–2007), dean of the School of Education, professionalized BJU's education curriculum; leader in the Christian school movement; namesake of the university's fitness center
- Dwight Gustafson (1930–2014), conductor and composer; assumed the position of acting dean of the BJU School of Fine Arts in 1954, when he was 24 years old, and served as dean for 40 years; known for writing and arranging more than 160 musical compositions; namesake of Dwight Gustafson Fine Arts Center
- Eunice Hutto Morelock (1904–1947), mathematics professor; one of the first female academic deans of a coeducational college in the US; namesake of a wing of the Bob Jones Academy quadrangle
- Robert Kirthwood "Lefty" Johnson (1910–1971), BJU business manager from 1935 until his death; namesake of a residence hall
- Darell Koons (1924–2016), painter
- Laurence Morton (1924–2002), chairman of the BJU piano department for more than forty years
- Robert N. Schaper (1922–2007), evangelical theologian, resigned from the BJU faculty in 1952 and completed his academic career at Fuller Theological Seminary
- Katherine Corne Stenholm (1917–2015), founding director of the University's Unusual Films studio; one of the first women film directors in America; keynote speaker at the Cannes Film Festival, 1958
- Jamie Langston Turner (b. 1949), novelist; her novel A Garden to Keep won 2002 Christy Award; her Winter Birds was named one of the "one hundred best books" of 2006 by Publishers Weekly

== Notable honorary degree recipients ==
- John Ashcroft, attorney general of the United States (1999)
- David Beasley, governor of South Carolina (1999)
- W. E. Biederwolf, evangelist (1931)
- Chiang Kai-shek, head of state of the Chinese Nationalist government
- Madame Chiang Kai-shek (1952)
- Frank G. Clement, governor of Tennessee (1956)
- Percy Crawford, evangelist, founder of The King's College (1940)
- James Parker Dees, founder and first bishop of the Anglican Orthodox Church (1965)
- Vic Eliason, founder of VCY America (2001)
- Theodore Epp, founder, Back to the Bible radio broadcast (1955)
- Billy Graham, evangelist (1948)
- Lindsey Graham, U.S. senator, South Carolina (1999)
- Trey Gowdy, U.S. representative, South Carolina, 4th District (2017)
- Mordecai Ham, evangelist and prohibitionist (1935)
- Jesse Helms, U.S. senator, North Carolina (1976)
- Richmond Pearson Hobson, admiral, congressman from Georgia, Medal of Honor recipient, temperance crusader (1935)
- William Henry Houghton, fourth president of Moody Bible Institute (1942)
- Bob Inglis, U.S. representative, South Carolina (1995)
- Harry A. Ironside, Bible teacher, author, pastor of Moody Memorial Church, Chicago (1941)
- Olin Johnston, U.S. senator, South Carolina (1948)
- Robert T. Ketcham, founder of General Association of Regular Baptist Churches (1961)
- B.R. Lakin, Baptist evangelist (1949)
- Lester Maddox, staunch segregationist, governor of Georgia (1969)
- Ernest Manning, premier of Alberta (1947)
- Carl McIntire, radio preacher; founder of Bible Presbyterian Church (1953)
- Henry Morris, a founder of the young-earth creationist movement (1966)
- Harold J. Ockenga, pastor of Park Street Congregational Church, Boston, Massachusetts; later, a leader in the "neo-evangelical" movement opposed by BJU (1944)
- Ian Paisley, founder and moderator of the Free Presbyterian Church of Ulster; future leader of the Democratic Unionist Party, first minister of Northern Ireland (1966) and spiritual leader of Loyalist terrorist groups (UDA, UVF)
- John R. Rice, evangelist and founder of The Sword of the Lord (1945)
- Homer Rodeheaver, music evangelist, pioneer gospel music publisher (1942)
- Tim Scott, U.S. senator (2018)
- Charles Stevens, founder and first president of Piedmont Baptist College (1958)
- Billy Sunday, evangelist (1935)
- Helen "Nell" (Mrs. Billy) Sunday, evangelist (1940)
- Strom Thurmond, U.S. senator, South Carolina (1948)
- Mel Trotter, rescue mission founder, Bible conference speaker (1935)
- George Wallace, governor of Alabama (1964)

== Notable benefactors ==
- Bibb Graves, two-term governor of Alabama (1927–31, 1935–39). Although Graves was Exalted Cyclops (chapter president) of the Montgomery branch of the Ku Klux Klan when he was first elected governor, he was also a progressive who sought to improve public education in Alabama. Graves served as a member of the board of trustees of Bob Jones College and a BJU residence hall was named for him until 2011.
- John Sephus Mack (1880–1940), early twentieth century entrepreneur who (with Walter C. Shaw) created G.C. Murphy Stores, a regional chain of more than two hundred "five and dimes" headquartered in McKeesport, PA. Mack was a significant contributor to Bob Jones College during the Depression—when Murphy Stores were actually expanding—and he underwrote major building projects on the Cleveland campus. Mack also gave business advice to Bob Jones, Sr. and "Lefty" Johnson before his death in 1940. The BJU library is named for him and a residence hall for his wife.
- Robert Lee McKenzie (1870–1956), developer and first mayor of Panama City, Florida. The college charter was signed in the office/library of his home, which is listed on the National Register of Historic Places; Dixon-McKenzie Dining Common is named in honor of him, his wife, and his sister-in-law, Mary Elizabeth Dixon
- Agnes Moorehead, actress of Bewitched fame, willed her Ohio estate to BJU. Moorehead's father was a Presbyterian minister, and in 1921, when Agnes was an undergraduate at Muskingum College, New Concord, Ohio—a Presbyterian school founded by her uncle—the college presented an honorary degree to Bob Jones, Sr.

== Notable former students (non-graduates) ==
- Billy Graham, evangelist, attended one semester
- Katherine Helmond, actress, attended one year and had role in Unusual Films' Wine of Morning (1955)
- John F. MacArthur, radio preacher; pastor, Grace Community Church, Sun Valley, California; president of the Master's College; attended two years
- Rich Merritt, LGBT activist, adult film actor, writer, and attorney
- Fred Phelps, pastor of Westboro Baptist Church; known for "God Hates Fags" website and public protests; his association with the school ended abruptly after three semesters; once claimed he left because of opposition to the school's racial policies and later denied that he had ever attended
- Charles D. Provan; his Bible and Birth Control provides a theological justification for Quiverfull; attended two years
- Chris Sligh, American Idol finalist during season 6; attended three and a half years
