= Calumet High School (Calumet, Michigan) =

Location
- 57070 Mine Street; Calumet, Michigan 49913; United States
- Coordinates: 47°14′36″N 88°26′50″W

Information
- School type: Public high school
- Established: 1867
- School district: Public Schools of Calumet-Laurium-Keweenaw
- Superintendent: Christopher Davidson
- Principal: Jennifer Peters
- Teaching staff: 28.97 (on an FTE basis)
- Grades: 9-12
- Enrollment: 499 (2023-2024)
- Student to teacher ratio: 17.22
- Campus type: Town
- Colors: Blue; Gray; White
- Fight song: Victory March
- Athletics: MHSAA Class B
- Athletics conference: West-Pac Conference
- Nickname: Copper Kings
- Rival: Houghton High School(Gremlins)
- Yearbook: Peace Pipe
- Website: www.clkschools.org/high.php

Calumet High School is located in Calumet, Michigan in Michigan's Keweenaw Peninsula. It serves from grades 9 to 12 for the Public Schools of Calumet-Laurium-Keweenaw. The high school shares its building with Washington Middle School.

== History ==
The school was established in 1867 during a copper boom in the Upper Peninsula. The school itself is a product of the powerful Calumet and Hecla Mining Company that once owned and operated much of Calumet. In the late 19th and early 20th century Calumet became a large, prosperous town. The population drastically went down once the mines began to close down during the 1940s and 1950s.

== Academics ==
Current courses of study include Academic, Engineering, Business, Tech and Trades. As of 2022, Calumet High School offers two AP courses, including AP Computer Science Principles and AP Computer Science A.

== Attendance boundary ==
Within Houghton County, the school district (and therefore the high school attendance boundary) includes Calumet, Copper City, and Laurium. The district includes the majority of Calumet Township, much of Osceola Township, and a section of Schoolcraft Township.

Within Keweenaw County, the district includes Ahmeek, Eagle Harbor, Eagle River, Fulton, and Mohawk. Townships include Allouez Township, Eagle Harbor Township, and Houghton Township.

== Demographics ==
The demographic breakdown of the 496 students enrolled in 2018-19 was:

- Male - 46.2%
- Female - 53.8%
- Native American - 0.4%
- Asian - 0.8%
- Hispanic - 0.8%
- Pacific Islander - 0.2%
- White - 96.4%
- Multiracial - 1.4%

In addition, 47.2% of students were eligible for free or reduced-price lunch.

== Athletics ==
The Calumet Copper Kings compete in the West-Pac Conference. School colors are blue and grey. For the school year 2019–20, the following Michigan High School Athletic Association (MHSAA) sanctioned sports were offered:

- Baseball (boys)
- Basketball (girls and boys)
  - Girls state champion - 2015
- Bowling (girls and boys)
- Competitive cheerleading (girls)
- Cross country (girls and boys)
  - Boys Upper Peninsula (UP) champion - 1994, 1996, 1997, 1998
  - Girls UP champion - 1985, 1987, 1989, 1991, 1992, 1993, 1994, 1995, 2009, 2010, 2012
- Football (boys)
- Golf (girls and boys)
  - Boys UP champion - 1997, 1998
  - Girls UP champion - 1991, 1995
- Gymnastics (girls)
  - UP champion - 1988
- Ice hockey (boys)
  - State champion - 1992, 1993, 1996, 1998, 2003, 2008
- Skiing (boys)
- Softball (girls)
- Track and field (girls and boys)
  - Boys UP champion - 1971, 1975, 1987, 1998, 1999
  - Girls UP champion - 1988, 2006
- Volleyball (girls)

== Notable alumni ==
- George Brunet, baseball player
- George Gipp, college football player
- Ben Johnson, ice hockey player
- Russ McLeod, NFL football player
- Verna Grahek Mize, environmental activist
- Les Ollila, evangelist
