= Abeka =

Publisher of Christian curricula

Abeka Book, LLC
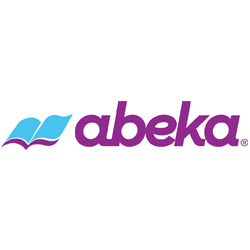
- Logo since 2017
- Type: Private
- Industry: Educational publishing
- Founded: 1972; 54 years ago
- Founder: Arlin & Beka Horton
- Headquarters: Pensacola, Florida
- Key people: Troy Shoemaker (President)
- Parent: Pensacola Christian College
- Website: www.abeka.com

Abeka Book, LLC, known as A Beka Book until 2017, is an American publisher affiliated with Pensacola Christian College (PCC) that produces K-12 curriculum materials that are used by Christian schools and homeschooling families around the world. It is named after Rebekah Horton, wife of college president Arlin Horton. By the 1980s, Abeka and BJU Press (formerly Bob Jones University Press) were the two major publishers of Christian-based educational materials in America. Its books have been criticized for lack of academic rigor and misinformation on scientific and historical subjects.

== History ==
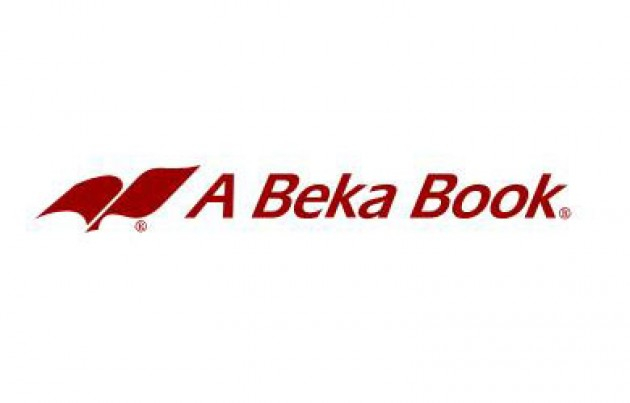
A Beka Book logo used until 2017

The company started in 1972 as A Beka Book. In 2017, the company rebranded as Abeka. The Abeka Academy video program is available on DVD and streams online.

== Accreditation ==
Abeka's video program (Abeka Academy) and the Traditional Parent-Directed program are accredited by the Middle States Association of Colleges and Schools Commissions on Elementary and Secondary Schools (MSA-CESS) and by the Florida Association of Christian Colleges and Schools (FACCS).

== Criticism ==
Educators have criticized some Abeka textbooks as lacking academic rigor and taking contrary or reactive positions toward their subject matter. Experts from the University of Florida and University of Central Florida in 2018 criticized the content of Abeka textbooks as being markedly simpler and less challenging than the content of comparable textbooks used in public education.

Abeka history books are dramatically different from mainstream books, especially on matters of race. A section of the high-school textbook United States History: Heritage of Freedom is titled "Birth of a Nation", evoking the 1915 film of the same name that glorified the Ku Klux Klan. Other Christian Nationalist rhetoric describes slavery as "black immigration".

Science textbooks published by Abeka defy the scientific consensus regarding the origins of the universe, origins of life, and evolution. Abeka takes Biblical literalist and young Earth creationist positions in its science curriculum, teaching the Genesis creation narrative as a literal and factual account. An Abeka science book denounces evolution as a "retreat from science."

In 2006, the Association of Christian Schools International sued the University of California after the university rejected school credits based on books published by Abeka and one similar publisher. In the case of Association of Christian Schools International v. Roman Stearns, a judge upheld the University of California's finding that the books are "inconsistent with the viewpoints and knowledge generally accepted in the scientific community".

== Tax status ruling ==
Between 1988 and 1996, Abeka Book held tax exempt status, because its profits were channeled into PCC as a tax-exempt religious organization or educational institution. In January 1995, the U.S. Internal Revenue Service ruled that the college's publishing arm was liable for taxes as a profit-making entity. The IRS further ruled that the profits of the publishing arm benefited the organization as a whole, because both A Beka Book and PCC were run under the same organization and that all of the profits of A Beka Book went directly to PCC, constituting 60% of the college's income. The effect of this ruling rendered the publishing company ineligible for future tax exempt status.

Although PCC was ultimately cleared of any liability for back taxes, PCC paid the estimated $44.5 million, and A Beka Book paid another $3.5 million.
