= Biology for Christian Schools =

1991 book by William S. Pinkston

- Cover
- Author: William S. Pinkston
- Language: English
- Subject: Biology
- Publisher: Bob Jones University Press
- Publication date: January 1991
- Publication place: United States
- Media type: Print (Hardcover and Paperback)
- Pages: 693
- ISBN: 0-89084-556-5
- OCLC: 33968587
- Dewey Decimal: 574 20
- LC Class: QH308.2 .P56 1994

Biology for Christian Schools is a 1991 school-level biology textbook written from a Young Earth Creation point of view by William S. Pinkston and published by the Bob Jones University Press. The book has been controversial because it espouses the idea of Biblical inerrancy; that whenever science and Christianity conflict, the current scientific understanding is wrong. The book promotes creationism, which is rejected by the National Academy of Sciences, the National Association of Biology Teachers and the National Science Teachers Association who state creationism and intelligent design are pseudoscience.

Francisco J. Ayala, a biologist at University of California, Irvine, wrote the book "rejects generally accepted scientific knowledge" and "explicitly rejects the scientific methodology generally accepted by the scientific community."

== 2008 court decision ==
In 2005 the book became a subject in the lawsuit Association of Christian Schools International v. Stearns The book states, "The people who have prepared this book have tried consistently to put the Word of God first and science second." ACSI sued the University of California for discrimination against its science courses that contain creationist ideas. In the March 2008 ruling the Judge quoted Biology for Christian Schools stating:

Plaintiff's evidence also supports Defendants' conclusion that these biology texts are inappropriate for use as the primary or sole text. Plaintiffs' own biology expert, Professor Michael Behe, testified that "it is personally abusive and pedagogically damaging to de facto require students to subscribe to an idea. . . . Requiring a student to, effectively, consent to an idea violates [her] personal integrity. Such a wrenching violation [may cause] a terrible educational outcome." (Behe Decl. Para. 59.)

Yet, the two Christian biology texts at issue commit this "wrenching violation." For example, Biology for Christian Schools declares on the very first page that:

1. "'Whatever the Bible says is so; whatever man says may or may not be so,' is the only [position] a Christian can take. . . ."
2. "If [scientific] conclusions contradict the Word of God, the conclusions are wrong, no matter how many scientific facts may appear to back them."
3. "Christians must disregard [scientific hypotheses or theories] that contradict the Bible." (Phillips Decl. Ex. B, at xi.)
