= Katherine Helmond filmography =

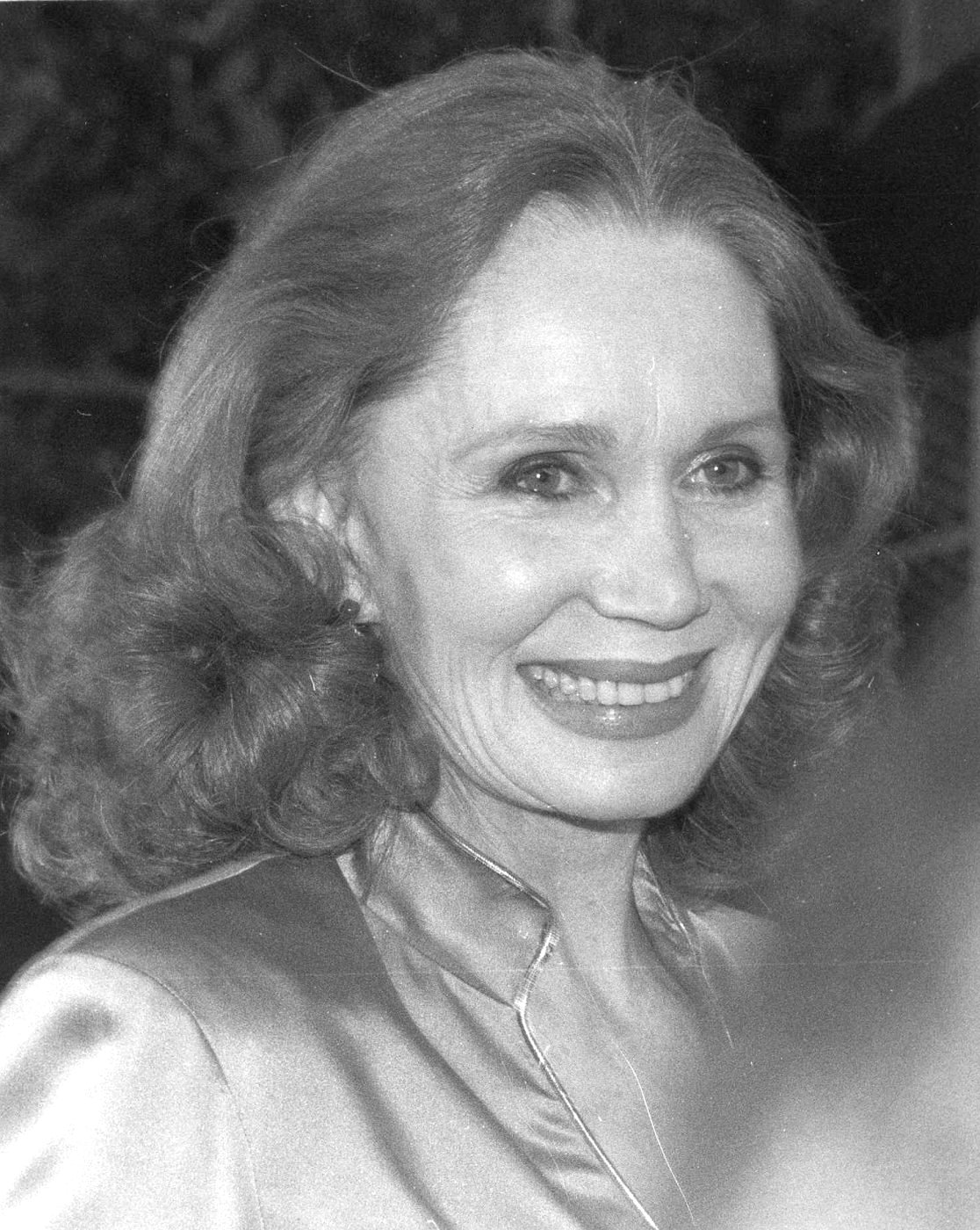
Katherine Helmond in 1980

Katherine Marie Helmond (July 5, 1929 – February 23, 2019) was an American film and television actress. Over her five decades of television acting, she was known for her starring role as ditzy matriarch Jessica Tate on the ABC prime time soap opera sitcom Soap (1977–1981) and her co-starring role as feisty mother Mona Robinson on Who's the Boss? (1984–1992). She also played Doris Sherman on Coach and Lois Whelan, the mother of Debra Barone on Everybody Loves Raymond. She also appeared as a guest on talk and variety shows.

Helmond had supporting roles in films such as Alfred Hitchcock's Family Plot (1976) and Terry Gilliam's Brazil (1985). She also voiced Lizzie in the three Cars films by Disney/Pixar.

== Filmography ==
Year	Title	Role	Notes
1955	Wine of Morning	Irene	
1971	Believe in Me	Saleslady	
1971	The Hospital	Mrs. Marilyn Mead	
1975	The Hindenburg	Mrs. Mildred Breslau	
1976	Family Plot	Mrs. Maloney	
1976	Baby Blue Marine	Mrs. Hudkins	
1981	Time Bandits	Mrs. Ogre	
1985	Brazil	Mrs. Ida Lowry	
1985	Shadey	Lady Constance Landau	British film
1987	Overboard	Edith Mintz	
1988	Lady in White	Amanda Harper	Nominated — Saturn Award for Best Supporting Actress (1990)
1992	Inside Monkey Zetterland	Honor Zetterland	
1993	Amore!	Mildred Schwartz	
1995	The Flight of the Dove	Dr. Pamela Schilling	a.k.a. The Spy Within
1998	Fear and Loathing in Las Vegas	Desk Clerk at Mint Hotel	
2000	The Perfect Nanny	Mrs. McBride	
2002	Black Hole	Martha Truesdale	
2003	Beethoven's 5th	Crazy Cora Wilkens	Direct-to-video film
2006	Cars	Lizzie	Voice
2007	The Strand	Isabelle	Direct-to-video film
2011	Cars 2	Lizzie	Voice
2011	Collaborator	Irene Longfellow	
2017	Cars 3	Lizzie	Voice
2018	Frank & Ava	Betty Burns	Final film role

== Television ==
Year	Title	Role	Notes
1962	Car 54, Where Are You?	Betty Lou Creco	1 episode; Uncredited
1972	Gunsmoke	Ena Spratt	Season 18, Episode 4: "The Judgement"
1972	The F.B.I.	Terry	Season 8, Episode 13: "The Jug-Marker"
1973	Adam's Rib	Martha Layne	1 episode
1973	The Bob Newhart Show	Dr. Webster	1 episode
1973	The ABC Afternoon Playbreak	Liz Cunningham	1 episode
1974	The Autobiography of Miss Jane Pittman	Lady at House	TV film
1974	The Snoop Sisters	Cissy Prine	1 episode
1974	Dr. Max	Libby Oppel	TV film
1974	Hec Ramsey	Emily	1 episode
1974	Larry	Maureen Whitten	TV film
1974	Mannix	Sylvia Jarrud / Martha Cole	2 episodes
1974	Locusts	Claire Fletcher	TV film
1974	Medical Center	Rachel	1 episode
1974–75	The Rookies	Joyce Lanson / Molly Phillips	2 episodes
1975	The Legend of Lizzie Borden	Emma Borden	TV film
1975	The Family Nobody Wanted	Mrs. Bittner	TV film
1975	Cage Without a Key	Mrs. Little	TV film
1975	The First 36 Hours of Dr. Durant	Nurse Katherine Gunther	TV pilot
1975	Barnaby Jones	Edna Morrison	1 episode
1975	Harry O	Anne Kershaw	1 episode
1975	The Six Million Dollar Man	Middy	1 episode
1976	The Blue Knight	Mrs. Stryker	1 episode
1976	James Dean	Claire Folger	TV film
1976	Petrocelli	Nancy Berwick	1 episode
1976	Joe Forrester		1 episode
1976	Wanted: The Sundance Woman	Mattie Riley	TV film; a.k.a. Mrs. Sundance Rides Again
1976	Visions	Aunt Sara	1 episode
1976	Spencer's Pilots	Elly	1 episode
1977	Little Ladies of the Night	Miss Colby	TV film; a.k.a. Diamond Alley
1977	The Bionic Woman	Dr. Harkens	2 episodes
1977	Meeting of Minds	Emily Dickinson	2 episodes
1977–1979	The Mike Douglas Show	Herself	6 episodes
1977–81	Soap	Jessica Tate	85 episodes Won — Golden Globe Award for Best Actress – Television Series Musical or Comedy (1980); Nominated — Emmy Award for Outstanding Lead Actress in a Comedy Series (1978–1981)
1978	Getting Married	Vera Lesser	TV film
1978	Pearl	Mrs. Sally Colton, Madam	TV miniseries
1979	$weepstake$	Lynn	1 episode
1979	Diary of a Teenage Hitchhiker	Elaine Thurston	TV film
1979–83	Benson	Jessica Tate	2 episodes; also as director
1980	Scout's Honor	Pearl Bartlett	TV film
1981–86	The Love Boat	Vivian / Harriet Darnell Stevens	3 episodes
1982	World War III	Dorothy Longworth	TV miniseries
1982	For Lovers Only	Bea Winchell	TV film
1982	Rosie: The Rosemary Clooney Story	Frances Clooney	TV film
1983	Faerie Tale Theatre	Jack's mother	1 episode
1983	Fantasy Island	Laura Walters / George Walters	1 episode
1984	Not in Front of the Kids	Millie Rosen	TV film
1984–92	Who's the Boss?	Mona Robinson	196 episodes Won — Golden Globe Award for Best Supporting Actress – Series, Miniseries or Television Film (1989); Nominated — Golden Globe Award for Best Supporting Actress – Series, Miniseries or Television Film (1986); Nominated — Emmy Award for Outstanding Supporting Actress in a Comedy Series (1988–1989); Nominated — TV Land Award for Favorite Mother-in-Law (2005)
1985	Comedy Factory	Mildred Deegan	1 episode
1986	Charmed Lives	Mona Robinson	1 episode
1986	Girls on Top	Goldie DuPont	1 episode
1986	Christmas Snow	Widow Mutterance	TV film
1986–1991	The Tonight Show Starring Johnny Carson	Herself	2 episodes
1988	Save the Dog!		TV film; a.k.a. Go for Broke
1990	When Will I Be Loved?	Barbara Patterson	TV film
1991	The Perfect Tribute	Farm Woman	TV film
1991	Deception: A Mother's Secret	Geena Milner	TV film; a.k.a. Tell Me No Lies
1992	Grass Roots	Emma Carr	TV film
1992	Batman: The Animated Series	Connie Stromwell	1 episode; Voice role
1993	The Elvira Show	Aunt Minerva	Unaired pilot
1993	The Upper Hand	Madame Alexandra	1 episode
1995	Liz: The Elizabeth Taylor Story	Hedda Hopper	TV film
1995–97	Coach	Doris Sherman	19 episodes
1996–2004	Everybody Loves Raymond	Lois Whelan	14 episodes Nominated — Emmy Award for Outstanding Guest Actress in a Comedy Series (2002)
1997	Ms. Scrooge	Maude Marley	TV film
1999	The Wild Thornberrys	Dugong	1 episode; Voice role
1999	Providence	Rose Bidwell	2 episodes
2000	Strong Medicine	Cicely Nordeco	1 episode
2000	How to Marry a Billionaire: A Christmas Tale	Shatzie	TV film
2001	Living in Fear	Mrs. Ford	TV film
2002	Mr. St. Nick	Queen Carlotta	TV film
2004–2005	The Tony Danza Show	Herself / Mona Robinson	3 episodes
2007	A Grandpa for Christmas	Roxie Famosa	TV film
2010	The Glades	Evelyn	1 episode
2010	Melissa & Joey	Mrs. Geller	1 episode
2011	True Blood	Caroline Bellefleur	1 episode
2011	Harry's Law	Mrs. Gold	1 episode
2012	Cars Toons: Mater's Tall Tales	Lizzie	Episode: "Time Travel Mater"; Voice

=== Video games ===
Year	Title	Role
2006	Cars	Lizzie
2007	Cars Mater-National Championship	Lizzie
