= The Fugitive (soundtrack) =

Film score by James Newton Howard
- Released: August 31, 1993 (standard); December 1, 2009 (expanded)
- Recorded: 1993
- Studio: Sony Scoring Stage, Sony Pictures Studios, Culver City, California
- Genre: Film score
- Length: 41:31 (standard); 126:21 (expanded)
- Label: Elektra Records (standard); La-La Land Records (expanded)
- Producer: James Newton Howard

James Newton Howard chronology
Dave (1993)	The Fugitive (1993)	The Saint of Fort Washington (1993)

The Fugitive is the film score composed by James Newton Howard to the 1993 film of the same name directed by Andrew Davis, starring Harrison Ford, Tommy Lee Jones, Sela Ward, Joe Pantoliano, Andreas Katsulas and Jeroen Krabbé. The score was released on August 31, 1993, under the Elektra Records label and featured 11 tracks from Howard's score. A complete expanded edition was released through La-La Land Records on December 1, 2009.

== Background ==
James Newton Howard composed the film's musical score with the Hollywood Studio Symphony. Howard had a difficult time scoring the film, recalling, "The Fugitive really kicked my ass. When I was hired for it, I was terrified." He became more despondent after listening to Jerry Goldsmith's work, which he had been using as placeholders for scenes that needed music. Howard was not confident that he could match the quality of those temporary cues, but he refused to quit, eventually conceding that his score would be a "quasi-failure". He was particularly dissatisfied with his work on the chase scenes, believing his string arrangements were too awkward.

== Release ==
Elektra Records released an album featuring selections from the score on August 31, 1993. La-La Land Records later released a two-disc, expanded, and remastered edition of the score, featuring over an hour of previously unreleased music, tracks from the original soundtrack, and alternate cues.

== Reception ==
Jonathan Broxton of Movie Music UK wrote "Although James Newton Howard himself didn't think his score was Academy Award material, The Fugitive has nevertheless gone on to be regarded as one of the quintessential action scores of the composer's career. It's a superb work that blends languid jazz and blues with aggressive, complicated, intricate action music – a perfect combination of his own developing stylistics, and appropriate acknowledgements of the film's own 1960s TV roots."

Christian Clemmensen of Filmtracks wrote "The Fugitive represents Howard's thriller and action mode in its early development and it's difficult to sing the praises of a score that is ultimately efficiently mundane and little more. It remains a significantly underachieving effort floated more by a superior film than vice versa." Jason Ankeny of AllMusic wrote "With a scaled-down orchestra primarily emphasizing strings and woodwinds, the music lives or dies on its rhythmic intensity, and Howard does not disappoint."

Janet Maslin of The New York Times called Howard's score "hugely effective". Leonard Klady of Variety wrote "special note is due James Newton Howard's score, which slips in just enough hints of the TV theme to bridge the years". Duane Byrge of The Hollywood Reporter wrote "composer James Newton Howard's propulsive score makes one feel Kimble's pounding heart." Glen Chapman of Den of Geek wrote "The score adds to the levels of tension, as it alternates between time signatures, with orchestral passages underpinning the score, and percussion very much the primary focus [...] Even with all of those elements, the score never goes over the top, with Howard showing a deft touch for creating suspense that would serve him well later in his career."

== Track listing ==
=== Standard edition ===
No.	Title	Length
1.	"Main Titles"	3:51
2.	"The Storm Drain"	4:25
3.	"Kimble Dyes His Hair"	4:22
4.	"Helicopter Chase"	4:50
5.	"The Fugitive Theme"	3:05
6.	"Subway Fight"	2:26
7.	"Kimble Returns"	3:07
8.	"No Press"	4:55
9.	"Stairway Chase"	2:32
10.	"Sykes Apt"	4:19
11.	"It's Over"	3:39
Total length:		41:31

=== Expanded edition ===
Disc 1
No.	Title	Length
1.	"Main Title"	3:50
2.	"The Trial"	4:31
3.	"The Bus"	4:56
4.	"The Hand/The Hunt/The Tow truck"	4:04
5.	"The Hospital"	4:06
6.	"Helicopter Chase"	4:49
7.	"The Sewer"	4:24
8.	"Kimble in the River"	1:52
9.	"The Dream/Kimble Dyes his Hair"	2:45
10.	"Copeland Bust"	1:59
11.	"Kimble Calls his Lawyer/No Press"	1:57
12.	"Kimble Returns to Hospital"	3:06
13.	"The Montage/Cops Bust the Boys/Computer Search"	6:50
14.	"Kimble Saves the Boy"	2:54
15.	"Gerard Computes"	1:49
16.	"The Courthouse/Stairway Chase"	6:13
17.	"Cheap Hotel/Sykes' Apartment"	4:37
Total length:		64:52

Disc 2
No.	Title	Length
1.	"Kimble Calls Gerard"	2:37
2.	"Memorial Hospital/It's Not Over Yet"	3:03
3.	"See a Friend/Sykes Marks Kimble"	2:12
4.	"This is My Stop/El Train Fight"	4:02
5.	"The Hotel"	2:42
6.	"Roof Fight Pt. 1/Roof Fight Pt. 2/Nichols Reappears"	3:52
7.	"The Elevator/The Laundry Room"	4:58
8.	"It's Over/End Credits"	5:40
9.	"The Fugitive Theme"	3:04
10.	"Kimble Dyes His Hair"	4:23
11.	"No Press"	4:57
12.	"No Press (Alternate)"	0:45
13.	"No Press (No Sax)"	1:31
14.	"Cops Bust The Boys (Alternate)"	1:09
15.	"Computer Search (No Sax)"	2:49
16.	"Roof Fight Pt. 1 (Less Percussion)"	1:57
17.	"Roof Fight Pt. 2 (Less Orch Verb)"	1:17
18.	"Helicopter Chase/The Sewer (Synth Demos)"	7:44
19.	"Piano End credits"	2:47
Total length:		61:29

== Personnel ==
Credits adapted from liner notes:

- Music composer and producer – James Newton Howard
- Co-producer – Michael Mason
- Music engineer – Greg Dennen, Sue McLean, Tom Hardisty
- Technical engineer – Bill Talbot
- Programming – Michael C. Mason
- Recording – Dan Wallin
- Mixing – Robert Schaper, Dan Wallin
- Mastering – Dave Collins
- Music editor – Jim Weidman
- Assistant music editor – David Olson
- Liner notes – Jeff Bond
- Executive in charge of music for Warner Bros. – Gary LeMel

Orchestra

- Orchestration – Brad Dechter, Chris Boardman, James Newton Howard
- Orchestra conductor – Marty Paich
- Orchestra contractor and manager – Sandy DeCrescent
- Copyist – JoAnn Kane Music Services
- Proofreaders – Aime Vereecke, Artie Kane, Barbara Franklin, Berwyn E. Linton, Bradley G. Dechter, Christopher E. Boardman, Conrad M. Pope, Cynthia A. Turner, Dan Franklin, Daniel Gold, Deborah S. Mitchell (Jones), Donald Rivers McGinnis, Douglas Dana, Ellen G. Fleming, Eric L. Stonerook, F. E. Scott Harris, Frank White Bennett, Harold L. Garrett, Howard W. Drew, James F. Hoffman, Jim Surell, Jeremy E. Thale, Jo Ann Kane, Joseph P. McGuire, Joe Porcaro, Joel Franklin, Julia A. Eidsvoog, Karen Marie Smith, Katherine Fields, Kirby M. Furlong, Larry B. Rench, Lars Clutterham, Lolita L. Ritmanis, Margaret Jean Maryatt, Norman Mark Frisbie, Michael C. Mason, Michael Melvoin, Ralph Fera, Robert M. Calderwood, Robert L. Manrique, Roberta McIntosh, Ronald F. Gorow, Russell Bartmus, Steven L. Smith, Thomas G. Brown, Tom J. Calderaro, Vincent Bartold, Wayne J. Coster, William T. Stromberg
- Booth reader – Bradley G. Dechter, Christopher E. Boardman

Instruments

- Acoustic bass – Chuck Domanico
- Bagpipes – Aaron Groszmann, Charles Burgin, Eric Rigler, Glen Thompson, Hugh Elder, James Yuile, John Davis, Scott Newton, Scott Ruscoe
- Bass – Arni Egilsson, Bruce P. Morgenthaler, Buell Neidlinger, Charles C. Berghoffer, Charles L. Domanico, David Henry Young, Drew D. Dembowski, Norman S. Ludwin, Paul J. Zibits, Richard Feves, Steven G. Edelman, Susan Ranney, Timothy C. Barr
- Bassoon – Julie Ann Feves, Kenneth E. Munday, Leslie Lashinsky, Michael R. O'Donovan, Patricia Kindel-Heimerl
- Cello – J. Antony Cooke, Armen Ksajikian, Barbara Jane Hunter (Badgley), Christine Ermacoff, David J. Low, David H. Speltz, Dennis Karmazyn, Douglas L. Davis, Earl S. Madison, Jerome Kessler, John A. Walz, Matthew A. Cooker, Paula J. Hochhalter, Raymond J. Kelley, Robert Lee Adcock, Ronald A. Leonard, Sebastian W. Toettcher, Stephen Erdody, Timothy Eric Landauer, Todd L. Hemmenway
- Clarinet – Dominick Fera, Gary G. Gray, Jim Kanter, John Lowe
- Drums, percussion – Alan C. Estes, Robert J. Zimmitti, Emil Radocchia, Jerry D. Williams, Joe Porcaro, Larry Bunker, Leonard Castro, Michael G. Fisher, Peter Limonick, Ralph A. Razze, Steven M. Porcaro, Steven Schaeffer
- Flute – David J. Shostac, Geraldine Rotella, James R. Walker, Louise M. DiTullio (Dissman), Sarah Weisz (Orme), Sheridon W. Stokes
- French horn – Carol Bacon Drake, Daniel P. Kelley, David Allan Duke, James W. Thatcher, John A. Reynolds, Kurt G. Snyder, Mark L. Adams, Phillip Edward Yao, Stephanie Mijanovich (O'Keefe), Steven B. Becknell, Steven L. Durnin, Todd L. Miller
- Harp – Anne Stockton (Mason), Eleanore S. Choate, Gayle R. Levant
- Keyboards – James Newton Howard, Michael A. Lang
- Oboe – Barbara B. Northcutt, Phillip W. Ayling, Thomas George Boyd
- Piano – James Newton Howard
- Saxophone – Wayne Shorter
- Trombone – William Frank Reichenbach, Charles C. Loper, Richard Nash, Lewis Melvin McCreary
- Trumpet – Boyde Wyatt Hood, David Preston Searfoss, George Burnette Dillon, Jon Lewis, Malcolm Boyd McNab, Mario F. Guarneri, Rick J. Baptist, Roy L. Poper, Warren H. Luening Jr.
- Tuba – James M. Self, John E. Pokorny, John T. "Tommy" Johnson, Norman W. Pearson
- Viola – Alan B. DeVeritch, Benjamin Simon, Carole Kleister-Castillo, Carole S. Mukogawa, Carrie Holzman-Little, Dan Lionel Neufeld, Denyse N. Buffum, Janet Lakatos, Laura E. Kuennen-Poper, Linn Subotnick, Margot L. Aldcroft (MacLaine), Mihail Zinovyev, Miriam M. Granat, Miriam Meyer, Nancy K. Roth, Pamela Goldsmith, Rick E. Gerding, Robin R. Ross, Roland A. Kato, Samuel Boghossian, Scott David Haupert, Steven A. Gordon, Victoria Eva Miskolczy
- Violin – Alan H. Grunfeld, Anatoly Rosinsky, Armen Garabedian, Arnold Belnick, Berj Garabedian, Robert A. Sanov, Brian Leonard, Bruce Dukov, Darius P. Campo, David W. Ewart, Dimitrie J. Leivici, Ellen Garaffa Gray, Guillermo (Gil) Romero, Haim Shtrum, Harris Goldman, Igor Kiskatchi, Irma W. Neumann, Jacqueline I. Brand, Jay A. Rosen, Joel G. Derouin, Karen Jones, Kathleen A. Lenski, Kenneth Yerke, Margaret L. Batjer, Mari Tsumura (Botnick), Mario R. DeLeon, Miran Kojian, Miwako Watanabe, Norma Leonard (Auzin), Patricia Johnson, Polly H. Sweeney, Rachel Stegeman (Robinson), Rafael Rishik, Ralph D. III Morrison, Rene Mandel, Robin Olson, Ron Clark, Ronald P. Folsom, Sheldon Sanov, Sheryl L. Staples-Centanni, Stuart V. Canin, Tamara Chang (Hatwan), Yoko Matsuda

== Accolades ==
"I was completely shocked. I just didn't think [my score] was worthy of a nomination, but that's often what happens. It worked, and the movie was so good. It makes everybody look better."

— James Newton Howard on the Academy Award nomination for The Fugitive.

Award	Category	Nominee	Result
1994 66th Academy Awards	Best Original Score	James Newton Howard	Nominated
1994 ASCAP Film & Television Music Awards	Top Box Office Films	James Newton Howard	Won
