= Harold Crosby =

Harold Crosby may refer to:

- Harold B. Crosby (1918–1996), president of the University of West Florida and president of Florida International University
- Harold Ellsworth Crosby (1899–1958), American architect
- Harold J. Crosby (1886–1920), composer and arranger

== See also ==
- Harry Crosby (disambiguation)
