= Colonel Crosby =

Colonel Crosby may refer to:

- Harold Ellsworth Crosby (1899–1958) World War II Lieutenant Colonel under General Eisenhower
- John Schuyler Crosby (1839–1914), Governor of Montana from 1882 to 1884 and was a Colonel of United States Civil War
