= Verna Grahek Mize =

American environmental activist (1913–2013)

- Mize being interviewed, 1974
- Born: April 25, 1913; Houghton, Michigan, US
- Died: January 1, 2013 (age 99); Potomac, Maryland, US
- Burial place: Arlington National Cemetery

Verna Grahek Mize (April 25, 1913 – January 1, 2013) was an American environmental activist. From 1967 to 1980, she led a campaign to prevent a mining company from dumping taconite tailings into Lake Superior. For her efforts, she was given the title "First Lady of Lake Superior", and was inducted into the Michigan Women's Hall of Fame.

== Early years and career ==
Mize was born in Houghton, Michigan, in 1913. She attended Calumet High School, graduating in 1940. She worked for many years for the federal government, including positions with the National Advisory Committee for Aeronautics, the Navy Bureau of Aeronautics, the Office of the Assistant Secretary of the Navy and the National Oceanic and Atmospheric Administration.

== Environmental activism ==
Mize lived in Maryland but returned to Houghton and the lake every summer. In 1967, she could see that "the lake was not as clear as it used to be." A friend took her to Silver Bay, Minnesota, where she observed the environmental degradation of Lake Superior, the largest body of fresh water in the world. She learned that the Reserve Mining Company (Reserve), a large producer of iron ore at Silver Bay, was dumping 67,000 tons of mining waste material, known as taconite tailings, into the lake every day. The waste being dumped by Reserve was 50 times greater in quantity than the natural sediment deposited into the lake by all the rivers on the American side. The "gray gunk" was clouding the water for miles around.

Mize organized and led the Save Lake Superior campaign to stop the dumping. By 1970, she had written thousands of letters to politicians, scientists, newspapers, and government officials. In the summer of 1970, she gathered over 5,000 signatures on a petition asking President Richard M. Nixon to save the lake. She visited personally with governors, EPA officials, and others showing them a bottle of dirty, milky water from the lake. She also submitted a detailed plan showing that it was feasible to dispose of the waste on land.

Mize's efforts ultimately won support from six U.S. Senators representing the Great Lakes area. The Environmental Protection Agency (EPA) issued a notice requiring Reserve to submit a plan to stop the pollution, but Reserve refused, and the Justice Department filed suit against the company in 1972. When the case went to trial in the summer of 1973, Mize carried a picket sign in front of the courthouse and sat in the front row as evidence was presented. She was a sharp critic of Reserve's attorneys, telling a reporter she did not understand why they were not wearing masks and adding, "I think they'd be ashamed to come in and show their faces."

At the trial, evidence was introduced that the waste material included billions of particles of asbestos and that water supplies in several communities along the lake were unsafe. A federal judge found the Reserve plant to be a "serious public health hazard." The trial court ordered an end to the dumping, but in October 1974, the Eighth Circuit Court of Appeals in St. Louis reversed the injunction. The litigation continued for years, and in 1980 the company was finally required to cease dumping into the lake.

== Family and honors ==
In 1980, Michigan Governor William Milliken honored Mize with the title "First Lady of Lake Superior". Also in 1980, a park in Houghton, located across the street from the house where she was born, was named in her honor.

In 2013, Mize died in Potomac, Maryland, at age 99. She was buried at Arlington National Cemetery.

She was posthumously inducted into the Michigan Women's Hall of Fame in 2016.
