= Rand Hummel =

American author and preacher

James Rand Hummel (born September 18, 1956) is an American author, preacher and camp administrator. He has worked for many years as assistant director of The Wilds Christian Camp/Conference Center in Brevard, North Carolina, and in 2007, he was named Director of THE WILDS of New England in Deering, New Hampshire.

== Biography ==
Rand Hummel was raised in Orangeville, Pennsylvania, and became a Christian at the age of 6. He came from a broken family and for many years lived with his Grandparents. Despite growing up with a lot of anger problems, Rand continued to attend church. He became unimpressed with what he perceived as a casual attitude toward God among many Christians. This led him eventually to Bob Jones University in Greenville, South Carolina.

Hummel received his B.A. from Bob Jones in 1978. Immediately after graduation, he went to work at The Wilds, a Christian camp in Brevard, North Carolina specializing in teen ministry. He was the Program Director there for 25 years. Describing his work, he said "a lot of my job is simply the teens. I preach to them, counsel them, hang out with them, run the games... We actually have the best job on the campsite." Every summer Rand speaks to around 15,000 teenagers who come to the Wilds. He later became the assistant director, and in 2007 was appointed Director of The Wilds of New England.

Maintaining a busy itinerary throughout the year, Hummel preaches about 350 times annually. He has also written several books and Bible study guides. Much of his speaking and writing focuses on evangelism, the knowledge of God through personal daily devotions, and moral purity.

He has also been part of the BJU Seminary's adjunct faculty since 1999. He received an honorary doctorate from the school in 2004.

Hummel and his wife Amber have had two miscarriages and one stillborn. He said that these experiences drew them closer to God. The Hummels also have two grown children.

In early March 2012, Hummel suffered a mild heart attack and spent several days in the hospital. He has since recovered and is reported to have returned home in full health.

== Controversy ==
Hummel's actions during Bob Jones University's sexual abuse controversy have been subject to controversy. Bob Jones University was accused of mishandling sexual assault reports and blaming victims for their abuse. In a 2009 sermon at BJU, Hummel recounted a story in which he instructed a woman to seek forgiveness from her abuser for what he referred to as "bitterness." This clip circulated on the internet as an example of the allegations against BJU, where Hummel has been an adjunct professor and counselor.

Hummel has also been personally accused of misconduct including denial of medical care for campers at the WILDS and emotional manipulation.

== Quotes ==
- "Make it hard to sin and easy to do right!" (Romans 13:14)
- "You can be as close to God as you want to be!" (James 4:8)
- "Why do we throw a pair of Levi’s on Christ and bring Him down to our level? He’s a holy God."
- "People say, 'What’s the difference – 25 years ago and now?' Easy – sin is not sinful any more. And nothing is that bad. So we need to help them to understand the seriousness and the wickedness of our sin, and see it through the eyes of God."
- "God wants the best for my life." (Common sermon theme, often having the audience repeat it with him)
- "When you put your stick in the fire, you don’t get a big ‘S’ on your shirt or your blouse and you're a super-Christian and never sin again because you will sin again. This just simply means that I’ve committed my life to the Lord, and it's a testimony of what God has already done in my heart.” (Said at the Friday campfire service during the summer camp program; in lieu of testimonies, campers are encouraged to throw a stick into the campfire to symbolize submission to God.)
- "Lord, help us to hate sin and love you more." (Common theme in prayer.)
- "There's just two choices on the shelf; pleasing God or pleasing self."

== Books ==
- God & I Time Treasures (Volume 1). The Wilds.
- God & I Time Treasures (Volume 2). The Wilds.
- Five Smooth Stones Scripture Memory/Memorization Plan. The Wilds. (2008)
- In Their Sandals. Positive Action for Christ. (2001). ISBN 1-929784-57-0
- The Dark Side of the Internet. BJU Press. (2004). ISBN 1-59166-305-9

Bible Meditation Series

- Lest You Fall: Meditations to Fight Moral Impurity. BJU Press. (2005). ISBN 1-59166-465-9
- Turn Away Wrath: Meditations to Control Anger & Bitterness. ISBN 1-59166-734-8
- Fear Not: Meditations to Overcome fear, worry, and discouragement. BJU Press 2008

Six-Week Bible Studies

- James: A Guidebook to Spiritual Maturity. The Wilds. (2000)
- Joseph: A Man with Character. The Wilds. (2003)
- Jonah's Magnificent God. The Wilds. (2004)
- Colossians, Jesus Christ: The Visible Icon of the Invisible God. The Wilds. (2005)
- Titus: Living a God-Centered Life in a Self-Centered World. The Wilds.
- Philippians: The Fourfold Secret to Outrageous, Contagious Joy. The Wilds. (2007)
- 1 Peter: Living in the Face of Ridicule. The Wilds.
- God Is.... The Wilds. (2008)
