= Ariton, Alabama =

- Town
- Location of Ariton in Dale County, Alabama
- Coordinates: 31°35′52″N 85°42′47″W
- Country: United States
- State: Alabama
- County: Dale

Government
  - Type: Mayor-Council
  - Mayor: Ben Key

Area
  - Total: 5.09 sq mi (13.18 km^{2})
  - Land: 5.09 sq mi (13.18 km^{2})
  - Water: 0 sq mi (0.00 km^{2})
- Elevation: 427 ft (130 m)

Population (2020)
  - Total: 662
  - Density: 130.1/sq mi (50.22/km^{2})
- Time zone: UTC-6 (Central (CST))
  - Summer (DST): UTC-5 (CDT)
- ZIP code: 36311
- Area code: 334
- FIPS code: 01-02428
- GNIS feature ID: 2405166

Ariton is a town in Dale County, Alabama, United States. At the 2020 census, the population was 662. It was incorporated in April 1906. The name is a blend of its two predecessor town names: Ariosto and Charlton.

Ariton is part of the Ozark Micropolitan Statistical Area.

== Geography ==
Ariton is located in northwestern Dale County. Alabama State Routes 51 and 123 pass through the center of town as Main Street. AL 51 leads northeast 11 miles (18 km) to Clio and southwest 3.5 miles (5.6 km) to U.S. Route 231, while AL 123 leads west 3.5 miles (5.6 km) to US 231 and southeast 12 miles (19 km) to Ozark, the Dale County seat.

According to the U.S. Census Bureau, the town has a total area of 5.1 square miles (13.2 km^{2}), all land.

== Demographics ==
=== Town of Ariton ===
Historical population
Census	Pop.	Note	%±
1910	431		—
1920	625		45.0%
1930	611		−2.2%
1940	561		−8.2%
1950	620		10.5%
1960	687		10.8%
1970	643		−6.4%
1980	844		31.3%
1990	743		−12.0%
2000	772		3.9%
2010	764		−1.0%
2020	662		−13.4%
U.S. Decennial Census

Ariton first appeared on the 1910 U.S. Census as an incorporated town.

=== 2000 Census data ===
At the 2000 census there were 772 people, 306 households, and 220 families in the town. The population density was 152.3 inhabitants per square mile (58.8/km^{2}). There were 335 housing units at an average density of 66.1 per square mile (25.5/km^{2}). The racial makeup of the town was 69.30% White, 29.27% Black or African American, 0.13% Native American, and 1.30% from two or more races. 0.78%. were Hispanic or Latino of any race.

Of the 306 households 39.2% had children under the age of 18 living with them, 47.1% were married couples living together, 20.6% had a female householder with no husband present, and 27.8% were non-families. 26.5% of households were one person and 15.7% were one person aged 65 or older. The average household size was 2.52 and the average family size was 3.02.

The age distribution was 28.5% under the age of 18, 8.4% from 18 to 24, 27.7% from 25 to 44, 18.4% from 45 to 64, and 17.0% 65 or older. The median age was 36 years. For every 100 females, there were 84.2 males. For every 100 females age 18 and over, there were 72.0 males.

The median household income was $21,083 and the median family income was $25,781. Males had a median income of $27,250 versus $17,639 for females. The per capita income for the town was $11,502. About 25.1% of families and 25.9% 55 of the population were below the poverty line, including 34.5% of those under age 18 and 22.2% of those age 65 or over.

=== 2020 Census data ===
Ariton racial composition
Race	Num.	Perc.
White (non-Hispanic)	435	65.71%
Black or African American (non-Hispanic)	139	21.0%
Native American	1	0.15%
Asian	2	0.3%
Other/Mixed	26	3.93%
Hispanic or Latino	59	8.91%

As of the 2020 United States census, there were 662 people, 272 households, and 182 families residing in the town.

=== Historic Demographics ===
Census Year	Population & Racial Majority (Note: Note about colors: With the exception of Hispanic, Pacific Islander, Other, and 2 or More Races, the colors depicted refer to those historically ascribed to them (White (White/No background); Black (Brown); Native American (Red); Asian (Yellow)) and are there to be easily identified on said chart. No racism or malice of intent is meant to be implied by their usage.)	State Place Rank	County Place Rank	White (White, Non- Hispanic 1980-	Black	Hispanic (1980-	Native American	Asian	Other	2 or More Races (2000-
1910 (Note: 1st year Ariton reported on census)	431 (-) (Note: (-)Indicates no immediate prior population figure or rank) (Note: Racial demographics not reported for places of less than 2,500 on 1910-20 censuses or for less than 1,000 on the 1930-90 censuses.)	165th (-)	5th (-)							
1920	625 ↑	153rd ↑	5th X (Note: X Indicates no change in rank)							
1930	611 ↓	166th ↓	5th X							
1940	561 ↓	179th ↓	4th ↑							
1950	620 ↑	216th ↓	4th X							
1960	687 ↑	216th (Note: Tied for 216th place with Cedar Bluff) X	5th ↓							
1970	643 ↓	255th ↓	7th ↓							
1980	844 ↑	262nd ↓	7th X							
1990	743 ↓	290th ↓	7th X							
2000 (Note: With addition of "Hispanic" to census, which could also be a person of any race, both population totals and percentages will add up to more than the total population.)	772 ↑	309th ↓	7th X	535 (-) 69.3% (Note: From 2000 onwards, White population only reported on chart as "Non-Hispanic White/One Race", which will be less than the overall White population that would also include White Hispanics, which would be counted under Hispanic exclusively.)	226 (-) 29.3%	6 (-) 0.8%	1 (-) 0.1%			10 (-) 1.3%
2010	764 ↓	342nd ↓	8th ↓	565 ↑ 74%	147 ↓ 19%	46 ↓ 6%		1 ↑ 0.1%	7 ↓ 0.9%	11 ↑ 1.4%

== Ariton Census Division (1960-70) ==
Historical population
Census	Pop.	Note	%±
1960	3,012		—
1970	3,190		5.9%
U.S. Decennial Census

Ariton Census Division was created in 1960 after the merger/reorganization of county precincts into census divisions. In 1980, it was consolidated into the Ozark Census Division.

== Climate ==
The climate in this area is characterized by hot, humid summers and generally mild to cool winters. According to the Köppen Climate Classification system, Ariton has a humid subtropical climate, abbreviated "Cfa" on climate maps.

Climate data for Ariton, Alabama
Month	Jan	Feb	Mar	Apr	May	Jun	Jul	Aug	Sep	Oct	Nov	Dec	Year
Mean daily maximum °C (°F)	16 (61)	18 (64)	22 (71)	26 (79)	29 (85)	33 (91)	33 (91)	33 (91)	31 (88)	27 (80)	21 (70)	17 (62)	26 (78)
Mean daily minimum °C (°F)	4 (39)	5 (41)	9 (48)	12 (54)	17 (62)	20 (68)	21 (70)	21 (70)	19 (66)	13 (56)	8 (46)	5 (41)	13 (55)
Average precipitation mm (inches)	120 (4.6)	130 (5)	140 (5.7)	120 (4.6)	94 (3.7)	120 (4.6)	160 (6.3)	120 (4.9)	110 (4.3)	58 (2.3)	81 (3.2)	120 (4.9)	1,370 (54.1)
Source: Weatherbase

== Notable people ==
- Eunice Hutto Morelock, pioneer faculty member at Bob Jones College
- Willie Mae "Big Mama" Thornton, American rhythm and blues singer and songwriter
