= Rich Merritt =

American activist (born 1967)

- Born: Richard Wayne Merritt; September 26, 1967 (age 58); Greenville, South Carolina, U.S.
- Education: Clemson University (BS); University of Southern California (JD)
- Occupations: Author, attorney
- Website: richmerritt.wordpress.com

Richard Wayne Merritt (born September 26, 1967) is an American LGBT activist, adult film actor, writer, and attorney. Merritt has been a public figure since he was featured on the cover of The New York Times Magazine on June 28, 1998, in an article by Jennifer Egan entitled Uniforms In The Closet: The Shadow Life Of A Gay Marine.

== Biography ==
=== Early life ===
Merritt was born in Greenville, South Carolina to fundamentalist Christian parents. Merritt attended the elementary and secondary schools of Bob Jones University. During his high school summers he worked in various positions at The Wilds, a fundamentalist Christian camp. He attended Bob Jones University for two years and in 1988 transferred to Clemson University.

=== United States Marine Corps ===
Soon after his eighteenth birthday, Merritt enlisted in the United States Marine Corps (the Marine Forces Reserve) and in January 1986 he shipped off to Marine Corps Recruit Depot Parris Island, South Carolina. After completing boot camp he attended a brief occupational school at the Redstone Arsenal in Huntsville, Alabama. Merritt returned to Greenville where he joined his Marine Corps Reserve unit, a company of ammunition technicians. Merritt attained the rank of sergeant in May 1990, but because he was transitioning to the officer program, he did not deploy to Operation Desert Storm with the reserve unit. Merritt left the Marines in August 1998.

=== Adult films ===
While in the Marine corps, Merritt appeared in 5 adult films under the stage name Danny Orlis.

=== Law ===
In August 1998 Merritt enrolled at the University of Southern California Law School in Los Angeles and graduated with a Juris Doctor in May 2001. He was a summer associate at the LA office of the international law firm Jones Day and became an associate after law school. He was admitted to the California Bar Association in December 2001.

In late 2003 Merritt's father was diagnosed with amyotrophic lateral sclerosis (ALS), a fatal disease known also as Lou Gehrig's disease. The diagnosis and the nature of the illness prompted Merritt to give up his San Diego law practice in early 2004 and return to the South to be near his family in this time of crisis. He obtained employment at the former Powell Goldsten, an Atlanta law firm now part of Bryan Cave. His father died in 2005 and a year later Merritt moved to New York where currently he works as an attorney in Manhattan.

== Controversies ==
=== Fundamentalism ===
According to his memoir, Marine Corps boot camp at Parris Island was the first time he had any significant experience away from the fundamentalist enclave of Greenville and the BJU campus. During basic training his rack mate was Catholic, the first time he had befriended someone outside his faith. Bob Jones University has in its past had racially discriminatory rules. At boot camp, Merritt had an African-American drill instructor, the first time a black man had been in authority over him. Merritt has described boot camp as a "liberalizing experience."

When he left his initial active duty training assignments and returned to BJU, Merritt began having problems with the rules and policies of the school. A year later he withdrew while on a disciplinary status known as "spiritual probation."

=== Sexual orientation ===
Merritt had not yet grappled with the issue of his homosexual orientation. In his memoirs, Merritt claimed that when he attended Bob Jones Junior High School, Bob Jones III, then-president of BJU, said at a White House anti-gay protest that "homosexuals should be stoned to death as the Bible commanded." In June 1998, Merritt was featured on the cover the New York Times Magazine in a story about gay people serving the US military under the don't ask, don't tell policy. Merritt was only identified in the article by his initial R. Military authorities soon identified Merrit as the subject of the article, but because Merritt was not explicitly named in the article, he was not charged with sodomy under the Uniform Code of Military Justice

In August 1998 Merritt received an honorable discharge from the Marines and immediately enrolled at the University of Southern California Law School. That fall, a freelance writer named Max Harrold, approached Merritt about interviewing him for a story he planned to pitch to The Advocate, the leading national news and interest magazine serving the lesbian and gay community. Merritt agreed and he and Harrold met with Judy Wieder, The Advocate's editor-in-chief. She agreed to publish the story in the end-of-the year double issue featuring a roundup of notable events from 1998. The cover story for the issue featured George Michael, the singer who had just been arrested for public masturbation.

The February 16, 1999 edition of The Advocate exposed Merritt's secret career in gay pornography in a cover story titled The Marine Who Did Gay Porn.

In 2002 Merritt began working on his autobiography. In a cover story for A&U Magazine, Merritt described his motivations for writing the memoir, saying he wanted to set the record straight about his activities in gay porn and at Bob Jones University, but that writing the memoir was also therapeutic.

=== Periodicals ===
From 1996 until his resignation from the Marines in 1998, Merritt wrote an op-ed column for the Navy-Marine Corps Times, a Gannett-owned newspaper distributed on US military installations throughout the world. The Times had a section called "Back Talk" where one Sailor and one Marine shared their opinions on different aspects of the service. So that he could write candidly without fear of repercussion, the Times encouraged Merritt to write under a pseudonym so he chose the name "Buster Pittman," the name of his boyfriend's dog. For his columns, the Times editors allowed Merritt to use his column to advocate controversial positions such as allowing women to serve in combat, reducing the penalty for adultery from a felony conviction to a misdemeanor and repealing "Don't ask, don't tell" to allow lesbians and gay men to serve openly in the military.

This last column caught the attention of the Servicemembers Legal Defense Network, a watchdog group in Washington, DC who provided or arranged for legal aid to members of the military who needed assistance under the "Don't ask, don't tell" law.

== Published books ==
- Secrets Of A Gay Marine Porn Star
- Code of Conduct
- Spiritual Probation

== Media coverage ==
In January 2008, to launch the media blitz for Code of Conduct Merritt was interviewed for CBS News on Logo (TV Channel) by Itay Hod.
