= Morgan & Lindsey =

American department store

- Industry: Retail
- Founded: 1921 in Oakdale, Louisiana
- Defunct: 1980
- Successor: G. C. Murphy
- Headquarters: Jasper, Texas, United States
- Number of locations: 85
- Area served: Texas, Arkansas, Louisiana, Alabama, and Mississippi

Morgan & Lindsey was an American variety store chain. At its peak, it had 85 outlets in Texas, Arkansas, Louisiana, Alabama, and Mississippi. The company was headquartered in Jasper, Texas, and became a subsidiary of G. C. Murphy in 1959. The chain continued to operate Morgan & Lindsey stores until 1980, when most were re-branded to G. C. Murphy.

== History ==
The first Morgan & Lindsey store opened in Oakdale, Louisiana in 1921. By 1923, the store had stores in DeRidder and Natchitoches, Louisiana, along with Lufkin and Jasper, Texas.

G. C. Murphy assumed ownership of the Morgan and Lindsey chain in 1959 and continued to operate the chain as a subsidiary. G. C. Murphy continued to operate the stores under the Morgan and Lindsey name until 1980, when most were converted to the G. C. Murphy brand.
