= Harry Crosby (disambiguation) =

Harry Crosby (1898–1929) was an American poet, founder Black Sun Press.

Harry Crosby may also refer to:

- Bing Crosby (Harry Lillis Crosby, 1903–1977), American actor and singer
- Harry Crosby (businessman) (born 1958), American actor, singer, and banker, son of Bing
- Harry Herbert Crosby (1919–2010), WWII B17 Navigator, professor and author
- Harry W. Crosby (1926–2024), American historian and photographer

== See also ==
- Harold Crosby (disambiguation)
- Harry Crosbie
