= Association of Christian Schools International v. Stearns =

Legal case in the United States

- Court: United States District Court for the Central District of California
- Full case name: Association of Christian Schools International, et al. v. Roman Stearns, et al.
- Decided: August 8, 2008
- Docket nos.: 2:05-cv-06242
- Citation: 678 F. Supp. 2d 980

Case history
- Prior actions: Defendants' motion for partial summary judgment granted, plaintiffs' motion for summary judgment denied, 679 F. Supp. 2d 1083 (Mar. 28, 2008).
- Subsequent actions: Affirmed, 362 F. App'x 640 (9th Cir. 2010); cert. denied, 562 U.S. 975 (2010).

Court membership
- Judge sitting: S. James Otero

Association of Christian Schools International v. Stearns, 678 F. Supp. 2d 980 (C.D. Cal. 2008), was filed in spring 2006 by Association of Christian Schools International against the University of California claiming religious discrimination over the rejection of five courses as college preparatory instruction. On August 8, 2008, Judge S. James Otero entered summary judgment against plaintiff ACSI, upholding the University of California's standards.

== Lawsuit ==
The suit filed in the United States District Court for the Central District of California alleged that the university system's rejection of several courses, including a history course, a government course, and science courses, was "viewpoint discrimination" that violated the constitutional rights of applicants from Christian schools whose high school coursework is deemed inadequate preparation for college. The books in particular were published by A Beka Books and Bob Jones University Press. They contained problems such as statements that where science and the Bible contradict, the student must choose the Bible, and judgment of the value of American historical figures on their religion. The UC board concluded that those books did not offer proper preparatory instruction for the university. The lawsuit was brought by the parents of six children who had not been rejected from the university, but were required to take additional, remedial courses. In August 2006, the case was allowed to proceed against the university while lawsuits against individual school officials were thrown out.

The Association retained leading intelligent design proponent Michael Behe to testify in the case as an expert witness. Behe's expert witness report claimed that the Christian textbooks were excellent works for high school students and he defended that view in a deposition.

== Decision ==
On March 28, 2008, the defendants won a legal victory when their motion for partial summary judgment was granted, and the plaintiffs' motion for summary judgment was denied. In part of the judgment, the court focused on several creationist/intelligent design texts and quoted Behe's testimony against the plaintiffs:

Plaintiff's evidence also supports Defendants' conclusion that these biology texts are inappropriate for use as the primary or sole text. Plaintiffs' own biology expert, Professor Michael Behe, testified that "it is personally abusive and pedagogically damaging to de facto require students to subscribe to an idea. . . . Requiring a student to, effectively, consent to an idea violates his personal integrity. Such a wrenching violation [may cause] a terrible educational outcome." (Behe Decl. Para. 59.)

Yet, the two Christian biology texts at issue commit this "wrenching violation." For example, Biology for Christian Schools declares on the very first page that:

1. "'Whatever the Bible says is so; whatever man says may or may not be so,' is the only [position] a Christian can take. . . ."
2. "If [scientific] conclusions contradict the Word of God, the conclusions are wrong, no matter how many scientific facts may appear to back them."
3. "Christians must disregard [scientific hypotheses or theories] that contradict the Bible." (Phillips Decl. Ex. B, at xi.)

Biologist PZ Myers wrote, "The judge pointed out that the books that Behe approved flatly state that Christians must accept creationist conclusions—unlike our biology books, which don't demand any religious litmus test of their readers—and were therefore perfect examples of exactly the problem he was complaining about."

The August 2008 ruling concluded that various books offered by the school shouldn't be used for a college-preparatory history class because "it didn't encourage critical thinking skills and failed to cover 'major topics, themes and components' of U.S. history", Otero wrote. The judge said Calvary provided little admissible evidence to the contrary.

On January 26, 2009, ACSI filed an appeal on the decision. On January 12, 2010, the Ninth Circuit Court of Appeals affirmed the federal district court's summary judgment in favor of the University of California. On October 12, 2010, the Supreme Court declined to review the case, effectively ending it.

== Books involved in the case ==
- Timothy Keesee, American Government for Christian Schools, (Bob Jones University Press, 1989) ISBN 0-89084-484-4
- Biology God's Living Creation, (A Beka Book, 1994)
- Biology for Christian Schools, (Bob Jones University Press, January 1991) ISBN 0-89084-556-5
- Timothy Keesee and Mark Sidwell, United States History for Christian Schools (Bob Jones University Press, 2001) ISBN 1-57924-605-2
