= Eunice Hutto =

Eunice Hutto Morelock
- Born: December 18, 1904; Ariton, Alabama, U.S.
- Died: September 22, 1947 (aged 42)
- Education: Women's College of Montgomery (Huntingdon College), University of Alabama
- Occupations: Educator, Academic Administrator
- Known for: Possibly the first female chief academic officer of a coeducational college in the United States
- Spouse: Jefferson Davis Morelock Jr.
- Children: Jefferson Davis Morelock III
- Awards: Honorary Doctor of Pedagogy, Westminster College

Eunice Hutto Morelock (December 18, 1904 – August 22, 1947) was a pioneer professor at Bob Jones College and possibly the first female chief academic officer of a coeducational college in the United States.

== Biography ==
Hutto was born and reared in Ariton, Alabama, where her father owned the general store. She entered the Women's College of Montgomery (later Huntingdon College) at age 14 and graduated in 1923, at 18, the youngest member of her class. In 1929, Hutto completed a master's degree in mathematics at the University of Alabama, and in 1939 she received an honorary doctor of pedagogy degree from Westminster College, New Wilmington, Pennsylvania.

In 1928, after teaching mathematics in the Alabama public schools for five years, Hutto joined the faculty of the one-year-old Bob Jones College, then located near Lynn Haven, Bay County, Florida. According to her colleague R. K. Johnson, Hutto "seemed to catch a glimpse of the vision" of college founder, evangelist Bob Jones Sr. Hutto served as principal of Bob Jones Academy, 1931–36, and dean of the college, 1933–41.

According to Bob Jones Jr., Hutto was "strong [and] could be stubborn." Her impact on the fledgling college was immediate. As dean she was "tough-minded and unyielding to pressure," standardizing the curriculum and perceptively evaluating the faculty. She quickly gained the confidence of Bob Jones, Sr., who treated her as a member of his official family. Jones deferred to Hutto in "the technical educational work," and he noted in a 1935 chapel service that the two "check[ed] each other. I might turn this school into a camp meeting, but Miss Hutto says, ‘No, this is a college.’ So she keeps me reminded that this is a college, and I keep her reminded that we have to keep our religion." Hutto believed that she was the only female dean of a coeducational college in the United States.

In September 1941, Hutto resigned to marry Jefferson Davis Morelock Jr., a businessman from Cleveland, Tennessee, where BJC had moved in 1933. On her resignation as dean, Jones, Sr. named her to the BJC Board of Trustees. She returned to BJC to teach mathematics from 1943 to 1947.

Morelock died of leukemia on August 22, 1947, eight months after giving birth to a son, Jefferson Davis Morelock III. A building in the Academy Quadrangle of Bob Jones University, Greenville, South Carolina, is named for her.
