= Homeschool Hub (BJU) =

Homeschool Hub is an all-in-one learning management platform designed by BJU Press for homeschooling families, allowing users to plan lessons, track student progress, and manage assignments efficiently. It integrates various resources, including video lessons and grading tools, to support a comprehensive homeschooling experience. Homeschool Hub was launched in the early 2020s to help children still be able to learn during the COVID-19 pandemic.

== Curriculum ==
The Homeschool Hub primarily utilizes the BJU Press homeschool curriculum, which is designed for students from preschool through 12th grade. This curriculum integrates a biblical worldview across all subjects, ensuring that students receive a comprehensive education grounded in Christian values. Homeschool Hub was developed as part of BJU Press's ongoing commitment to support homeschool families, evolving from their history of producing educational materials since the 1970s. Over the years, BJU Press has expanded its offerings to include digital resources and online learning options, culminating in the creation of the Homeschool Hub to enhance the homeschooling experience.
