= R. K. Johnson =

Robert Kirthwood "Lefty" Johnson (August 28, 1910- November 4, 1971) was the pioneer financial officer of Bob Jones University and the first biographer of Bob Jones, Sr.

== Biography ==
Born in Lynchburg, Virginia, Johnson was orphaned at eight years of age and placed in the Odd Fellows Home where he remained until he was nineteen. He worked in the automotive shop of the orphanage and eventually took charge of the equipment and purchased supplies for the home.

Arriving at Bob Jones College in 1931, Johnson became a student leader and was elected president of the senior class. Although a religion major, he became bookkeeper of the College while still a student and was named business manager the following year when he was 25. He remained in that position for the rest of his life, with virtually his only formal business training that provided by John Sephus Mack, the president of G.C. Murphy stores, and Mack’s subordinates. In 1957, Johnson was given an honorary Doctor of Laws degree from the Bible Institute of Los Angeles.

Johnson discovered in Bob Jones, Sr. a father figure whom he admired intensely, and his loyalty to Jones and the school he founded never wavered. Even in a business report Johnson was capable of writing, “I am thankful to God for letting me be a part of the greatest and most wonderful school in the world.”

Johnson’s business sense was legendary. He was hard driving, frugal, decisive, and shrewd. Johnson loved to bargain and could make such a convincing sales pitch to local businessmen that they might contribute the items he needed and make a cash contribution to the University besides. His “pay-as-you-go” policy played a significant role in allowing the unendowed BJU to survive the loss of its federal tax exemption in the 1980s. At the same time, Johnson seems to have enjoyed an unusually warm family life. Before his death of a heart attack in 1971, Johnson cobbled together a commemorative biography of Jones, which includes a chapter on the construction of the Greenville campus in which Johnson himself played a significant role.
