= Chad Frye =

American cartoonist and illustrator

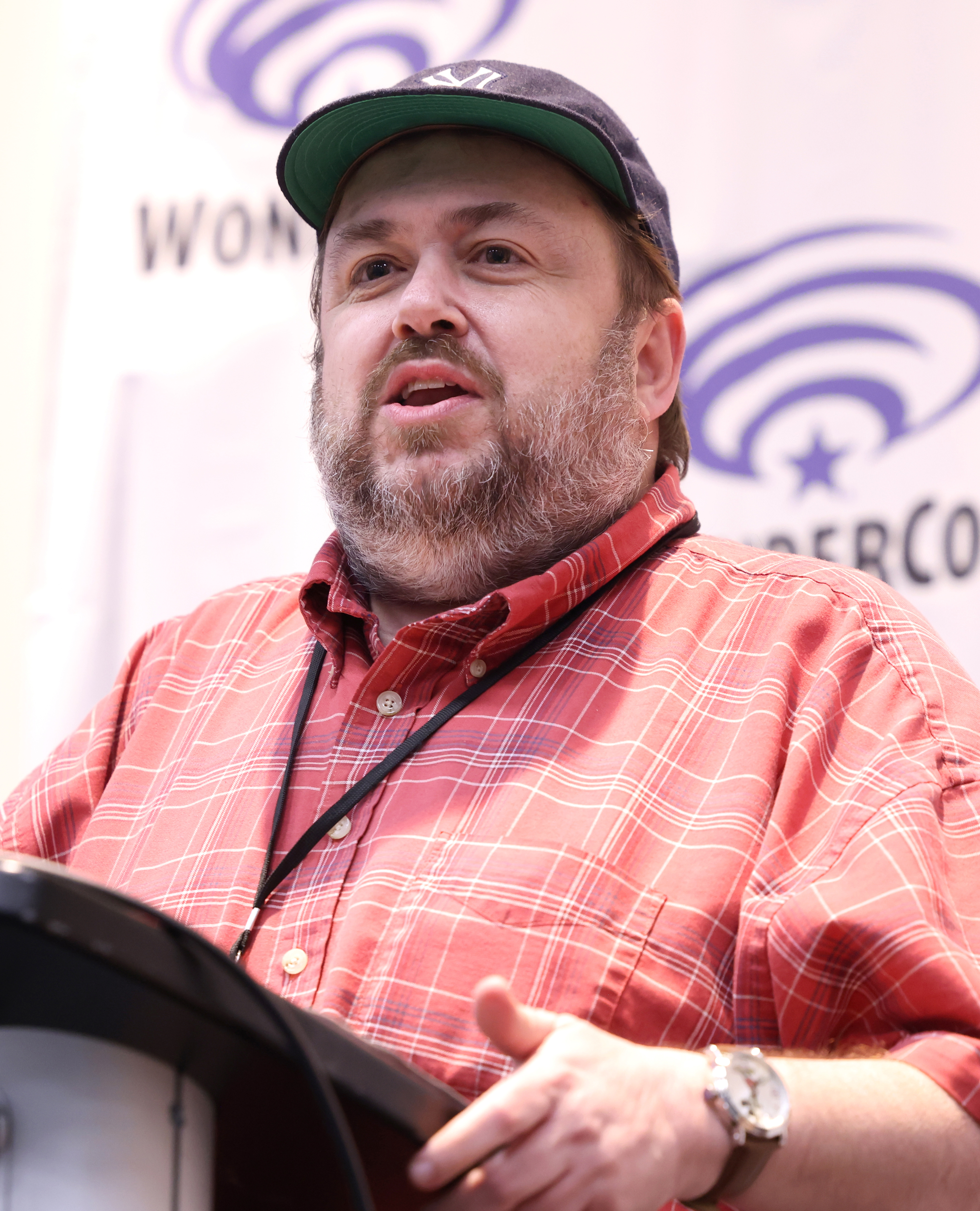
- Frye in 2025
- Born: Chad David Frye; New Jersey, U.S.
- Occupations: Cartoonist, illustrator
- Board member of: National Cartoonists Society – L.A. chapter

Chad David Frye is an American cartoonist and illustrator. He often works as a character designer and storyboard artist in animation.

== Biography ==
Frye grew up in New Jersey where he had a love to draw from childhood, and was particularly influenced by cartooning. A friend of his grandmother's, cartoonist Al Hartley, served as a mentor to the young Frye. Frye Attended Bob Jones University in South Carolina.

== Career ==
While still in college, upon the recommendation of Hartley, Frye landed his first book contract to create The Fun Bible Search Book...Find Rupert published in 1992 by Barbour Publishing ISBN 9781557483096. In October 1994, Frye's Find Rupert Again...the Fun Bible Search Book II was published by Barbour Publishing ISBN 9781557485199.

Frye illustrated over twenty children's books featuring Fisher-Price's Little People, Yogi Bear, X-Men, Mercer Mayer's Little Critter, Michigan J. Frog, Disney's Cinderella, Lady and the Tramp, Toy Story, and many other well-known characters.

While in South Carolina, Frye would be hired by a small animation company as a traditional animator for King's Quest VII computer game.

In 1997, Frye moved to Hollywood to work at Walt Disney Feature Animation on 1998's Mulan. Frye continued with Tarzan, The Emperor's New Groove, Atlantis: The Lost Empire, Treasure Planet, and Home on the Range.

In 1998, Frye illustrated Jonah and the Very Big Fish: The Book of Jonah for Children by Sarah Fletcher, published by Concordia Publishing House. ISBN 9780570075417

Frye's illustration clients include: Reading Rainbow, Two and a Half Men, Penn State, Gerber, Disney Comics, Clubhouse Magazine, Disney Publishing, International Plastics, Generations of Grace, Warner Bros., and ABC. Frye created courtroom styled illustrations to depict the music scoring session of composer Michael Giacchino for J. J. Abrams Star Trek.

Frye has designed characters for animated movies Norm of the North, several movies based on Zhu Zhu Pets toys, and television programs including Lalaloopsy and Scooby-Doo. As a storyboard artist he has contributed to commercials; television shows such as My Friends Tigger & Pooh and Mickey Mouse Clubhouse; and movies including Quest for Zhu, Tinker Bell, and Animal Crackers.

Frye has served as a board member of the L.A. Chapter of the National Cartoonists Society, CAPS – Comic Art Professional Society, and the Society of Illustrators of Los Angeles. Frye has served as an organizing force within the cartooning community, facilitating talks by other artists and charity auctions. In 2008, Frye was a contributing artist to The Sakai Project to benefit cartoonist Stan Sakai and his wife, published by Dark Horse Comics ISBN 978-1616555566. In 2015, Frye was among eight National Cartoonists Society members to participate on a USO tour to visit and draw for service members and their families based in Kuwait, Africa, and Turkey.

== Awards ==
In 2021, Frye received a nomination in the 75th annual NCS Ruben Awards in the Advertising / Product Illustration division.
