= Fulton, Keweenaw County, Michigan =

Unincorporated community in the US state of Michigan

Fulton, Michigan
- Census-designated place (CDP) & unincorporated community
- Location within the state of Michigan Location within the United States
- Coordinates: 47°17′56″N 88°21′36″W
- Country: United States
- State: Michigan
- County: Keweenaw
- Township: Allouez

Area
  - Total: 0.48 sq mi (1.2 km^{2})
  - Land: 0.48 sq mi (1.2 km^{2})
  - Water: 0.00 sq mi (0 km^{2})
- Elevation: 997 ft (304 m)

Population (2020)
  - Total: 149
  - Density: 310.42/sq mi (119.85/km^{2})
- Time zone: UTC-5 (Eastern (EST))
  - Summer (DST): UTC-4 (EDT)
- ZIP code(s): 49950 (Eagle River)
- Area code: 906
- GNIS feature ID: 626564

Fulton is an unincorporated community and census-designated place (CDP) in Keweenaw County in the U.S. state of Michigan. The CDP had a population of 149 at the 2020 census. The community is located in Allouez Township, immediately southeast of the community of Mohawk. Fulton is located in the Copper Country region of Michigan's Upper Peninsula.

== History ==
In 1847, the Forsyth Mining Company began operations at the site of present-day Fulton. In 1853, the Fulton Mining Company took over operations, and opened four new shafts, which discovered numerous deposits of copper and silver.

For the 2020 census, Fulton was included as a newly-listed census-designated place.

== Geography ==
According to the U.S. Census Bureau, the Fulton CDP has a total area of 0.48 square miles (1.24 km^{2}), all of which is land.

Fulton is located in the south of Keweenaw County, immediately southeast of the community of Mohawk. The community is located in the western Upper Peninsula of Michigan, and is located on the Keweenaw Peninsula, a smaller peninsula extending into Lake Superior.

== Demographics ==
Historical population
Census	Pop.	Note	%±
2020	149		—
U.S. Decennial Census
