= Ken Hay =

American businessman (1933–2019)

Kenneth Edward Hay (November 13, 1933 – April 2, 2019) was the founder of The Wilds, a Christian fundamentalist camp and conference center.

== Biography ==
Ken Hay, a native of California and a graduate of Oregon City High School, was the son of a pastor who took his sons to camp settings "as soon as we were old enough to walk." Hay, who was athletic and 6 ft 3 in (1.91 m), turned down several athletic scholarships to attend Bob Jones University, where he became a student leader and graduated in 1955 with a BA in Bible. He completed a master's degree at BJU in 1957. The following year he was named first director of the University's Institute of Christian Service (later the School of Applied Studies), a former BJU program for non-traditional students seeking to enter Christian ministries. He held this position for thirteen years. In 1975, BJU conferred on him an honorary Doctor of Laws.

In 1969, after directing Christian Dells Bible Camp (founded by Monroe Parker), near Trinity, Alabama, Hay founded The Wilds, a year-round 1,000-acre (4.0 km^{2}), non-denominational camp and conference center in the Blue Ridge Mountains near Rosman, North Carolina with the assistance of Walter Fremont, Joseph Henson, and Carl Blythe. More than three hundred churches now support The Wilds, its retreats attract 21,000 attendees annually, and more than a quarter-million campers have attended its summer programs, which combine recreation with Bible studies and devotional meetings. Hay reflected that while there was "no way a Christian organization can compete with the world when it comes to amusements...when you get young people away...you can have an impact."

The Wilds produces its own music CDs and has as its own missions arm CampsAbroad, an organization that assists with consulting and start-ups of Christian camps outside the United States. Hay retired as president and CEO of The Wilds in 2006, but he remained chairman of the board until his death.
