= Northland Scholars Academy =

Educational institution in Wisconsin, United States

Coordinates: 45°34′53.1″N 88°05′47.5″W

- Type: Private
- Established: 1976
- Location: W10085 Pike Plains Road, Dunbar, Wisconsin, US
- Website: northlandscholars.org

Northland Scholars Academy (formerly Northland International University) is a college prep high school, formerly a college, in Dunbar, Wisconsin, United States.

== History ==
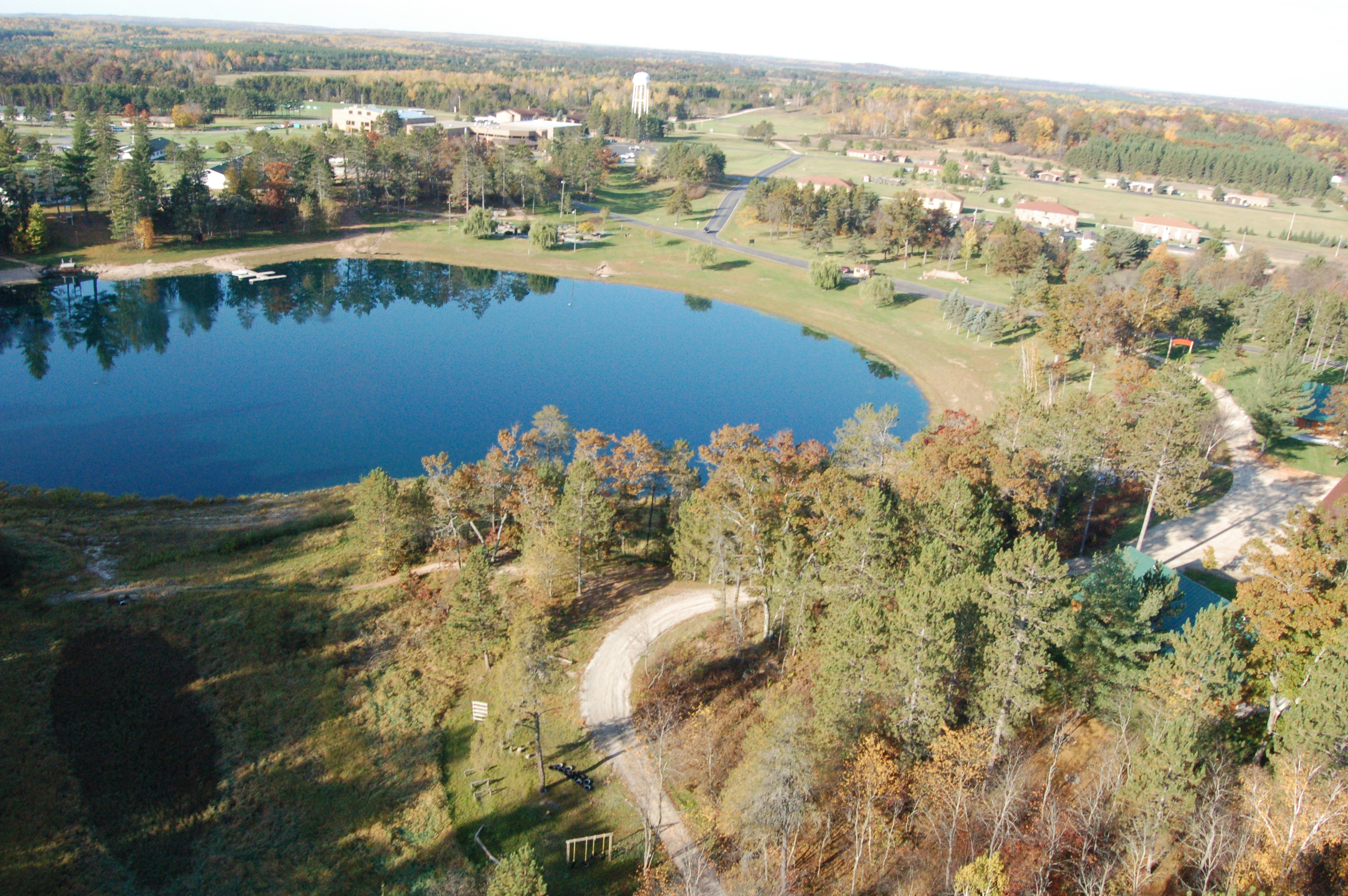
Northland International University: aerial photo of Camp Lake and many of the campus buildings

Northland Mission Camp (now Northland Camp and Conference Center) was founded on December 31, 1958, by Paul and Mamie Patz and Reverend Harold and Arlene Sailer. Sailer and his wife both graduated from Northwestern Bible College. Property for the 1,500-acre (6.1 km^{2}) facility in northeast Wisconsin was purchased in 1960. In 1976, Northland Bible Institute was started. The following year, it changed its name to Northland Baptist Bible College. On April 7, 2009, the school created the name Northland International University as a canopy name for its four entities: Northland Baptist Bible College, Northland Graduate Studies, Northland Center for Global Opportunities, and Northland Online. Northland Camp and Conference Center and Northland International University are branches of Northland Mission, Inc.

For much of its history, Northland operated without accreditation, which meant that its students were not eligible for government financial assistance. In 2004, Northland obtained provisional accreditation from the Transnational Association of Christian Colleges and Schools (TRACS), making its students eligible for federal funds. TRACS granted full accreditation in 2008.

In 2009, Northland requested inclusion in the Wisconsin Tuition Grant Program, so that undergraduate students from Wisconsin attending Northland could receive state financial assistance. In August 2009, the Wisconsin Higher Education System determined that Northland students were not eligible for state financial aid because the college's accreditation was not from a regional accreditation organization. Northland appealed the ruling to agency's board, citing TRACS' federal government recognition. A decision was expected in the fall of 2009, but students were not eligible for state aid for the 2009–2010 school year.

Northland was approved for participation in Wisconsin Tuition Grant program for the 2011–12 school year. The program was later renamed the Wisconsin Grant program beginning with the 2014–15 school year. Northland students eligible for the grant received it through the end of the 2014–15 school year, when the college ceased academic operations.

In 2018, it became a non-confessional college preparatory program under the name of Northland Scholars Academy. Students there can get associates degrees through an arrangement with Bay de Noc Community College of Escanaba, Michigan.

=== Leadership changes ===
On April 29, 2013, then-president Matthew Olson announced to all faculty, staff and students that he had been removed as president by the board. On May 8, the four board members that were not members of the founding family resigned. The remaining three board members voted to bring Olson back on as president, and on May 22, 2013 voted to install Daniel Patz as the new chairman of the board. A month later, On June 13, 2013, Olson announced to faculty and staff that he had resigned. He indicated that this would give the board the best opportunity to move forward and to succeed. On June 17 and 18, a board advisory council convened, and Mr. Daniel Patz was appointed as the university's fourth president.

=== Closure ===
In October 2014, Northland announced that the board of trustees of the Southern Baptist Theological Seminary had decided to accept the university's assets and campus as a gift and to establish an extension of Southern's Boyce college at the campus. However, on April 22, 2015, President Patz announced that The Southern Baptist Theological Seminary had reversed their previous decision and no longer intended to acquire Northland's campus. Following a meeting of the Northland Board of Trustees, Patz communicated the board's decision to close both the graduate and undergraduate schools of the university following the end of the 2014–2015 school year. Although the education branches of Northland Mission were closed, the Camp and Conference Center remain open, offering a variety of summer camps, and various youth, family, and ministerial retreats during the school year.

Northland International University ceased academic operations in 2015. Lancaster Bible College became the custodian of student academic records (transcripts). Several recordings made by the Northland Baptist Bible College Choir, such as A Heart to Praise and Holy is He, remain available.

=== Reopening ===
The reopening of the school took place in 2018 as the Northland Scholars Academy.

=== List of presidents ===
	Name	Tenure	Notes
1st	James Wooster	September 7, 1976 – 1980	
	Vacant	1980 – 1984	
2nd	Les Ollila	1984 – September 23, 2002	
3rd	Matthew R. Olson	September 23, 2002 – June 12, 2013	Dismissed by the board April 25, 2013; reinstated May 9, 2013; resigned June 12, 2013.
	Vacant	June 13, 2013 – July 23, 2013	
4th	Daniel Patz	July 24, 2013 – May 31, 2015	

== Campus ==
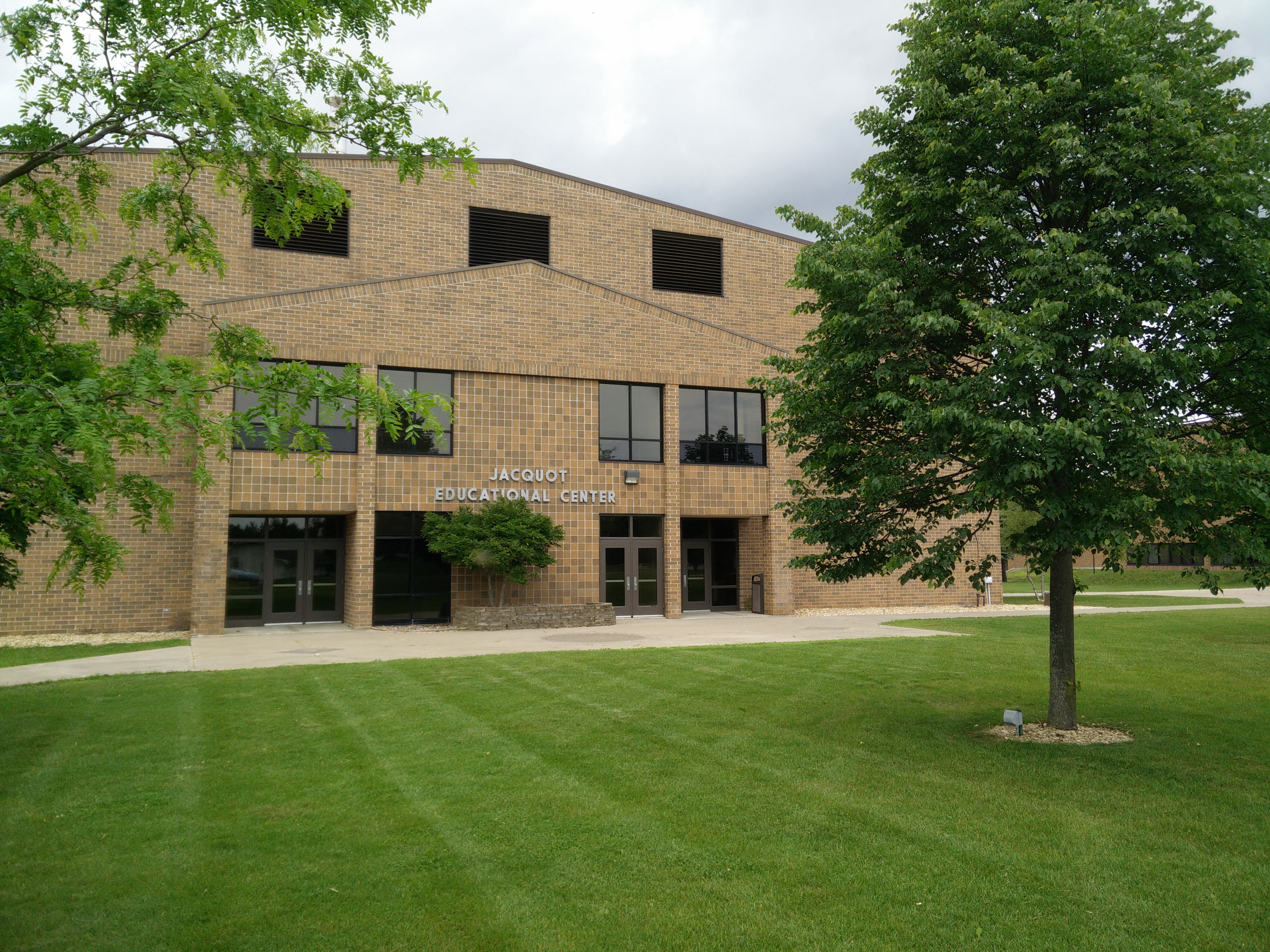
Jacquot Educational Center

Northland's 435 acre campus is located approximately 6 miles southeast of Dunbar, Wisconsin. The main classroom buildings are the Founder's Center, named in honor of the school's founder, Paul Patz; and the Jacquot Educational Center (JEC), named in honor of former dean Ardell Jacquot. The Founder's Center also housed the administrative offices, registrar's office, and business office of the university. The university library, which houses over 50,000 volumes, is located in the JEC. The campus also has a fine arts center where music classes and performances were held.

== Athletics ==
Northland's intercollegiate sports mascot was the Pioneer.The school was a Division II member of the National Christian College Athletic Association, and has competed in men's and women's soccer, men's and women's basketball, men's and women's cross-country, men's golf, and women's volleyball. Men's hockey and men's volleyball competed as athletic clubs not under the sanction of the NCCAA. Men's soccer and men's cross-country were traditionally Northland's strongest sports; as the soccer team won over ten regional championships in addition to several national championships. Their 2012 season ended with a loss in the national championship game to Moody Bible Institute, and in 2013 they earned a top three at-large bid in the national championship tournament. The cross-country teams earned four national titles in five years (2001–2003, 2005), and finished as the runner-up in 2006.
