= George W. Dollar =

American author and educator (1917–2006)

George W. Dollar (1917–2006) was a prominent Canadian-American preacher, teacher and author in Independent Fundamental Baptist circles. He is most famous as of co-founder of the Southwide Baptist Fellowship, author of 3 books including A History of Fundamentalism in America and a militant defender of his faith.

== Early history ==
Dollar was born in 1917 in a small town outside Saint John, New Brunswick as the first and only son for a young fisherman who died the same day Dollar was born. As brother to 14 younger half-siblings (although two died during childhood), Dollar would often listen to American radio thanks to a neighbor who would open the window so the children could listen. One night while listening to the radio, Dollar heard a sermon preached by British evangelist Gypsy Smith and immediately trusted in Jesus Christ for his salvation. He was ordained to the gospel ministry in 1942 by the Second Baptist Church of Newton, Massachusetts, and also pastored Bethany Baptist Church of Madison, Georgia and State Street Baptist Church in Cayce, South Carolina.

== Education ==
Dollar began studying in the Maritimes. First, he obtained a Teachers Certificate at NB Teachers College. He then studied briefly at both Acadia (NS) and then at Mount Allison University (NB). He transferred those courses and became a graduate of Gordon College (BA) and Gordon Divinity School (BD). He received the Master of Theology degree in church history from Emory University and received a Master of Arts and Doctor of Philosophy degrees from Boston University. he served as professor at Columbia Bible College, Dallas Theological Seminary (as chairman of the department of church history), Bob Jones University. and Piedmont Bible College (as vice-president). He was also dean at Central Baptist Theological Seminary of Minneapolis as well as being a pastor, conference speaker, and author.

== Southwide Baptist Fellowship ==
In 1956, Dollar co-founded the Southwide Baptist Fellowship and he authored the doctrinal statement adopted by the fellowship. In his final years, he taught and preached at the Lighthouse Ministries in Lakeland, Florida.

The final 2006 edition of his book, A History of Fundamentalism in America contains a large portion of the original 1973 scholarly work that the author wrote, the first historical reference book on the movement, and nine chapters of observations concerning the three decades since that publication. The volume represents the final research and writing of one devoted to Fundamentalism.

== Writings ==
Dollar authored three books including A History of Fundamentalism in America (1973 and 2006), The New Testament and New Pentecostalism (1978) and The Fight for Fundamentalism (1983).
