= Wine of Morning =

- Directed by: Katherine Stenholm
- Written by: Richard Girvin
- Starring: Al Carter; Joan DeVolk; Katherine Helmond
- Cinematography: Robert Craig
- Edited by: George Jensen
- Music by: Joseph Schmoll
- Release date: 1955
- Running time: 114 minutes
- Country: United States
- Language: English

Wine of Morning is a 1955 American film directed by Katherine Stenholm and starring Al Carter, Joan DeVolk, and Katherine Helmond. It has Barabbas as the subject, who was pardoned according to the Biblical report in place of Jesus Christ by Pontius Pilate.

The film is based on the novel Wine of Morning by Bob Jones Jr.

== Plot ==
On a stormy voyage Barabbas writes a letter to his friend Stephen and remembers his time in Galilean Nazareth.

There he is friends with the carpenter Josef and his son Jesus . One day he meets Irene, the future bride of his friend Stephanus, and falls in love with her. On Stephanus' and Irene's wedding in Cana, the wine goes out surprisingly. Mary asks Jesus for help, who then turns water into wine.

A little later, Joel decides to leave Nazareth and go to Capernaum. There he visits his friends Sarah and Jonathan and their son Dismas. Jonathan has been paralyzed, so Joel and Dismas supports Jonathan's business. He meets the rabid tax collector Levi and notes bitterly the oppression of the Jews by the Romans. While Joel would like to fight, Jonathan is waiting for salvation from God.

After Dismas one day watched with enthusiasm a demon exorcism by Jesus, he and Joel also bring Jonathan to Jesus. They let Jonathan down through the ceiling of the house to Jesus; Jonathan is healed.

In the meantime, Joel meets the stranger Omah, whose family was cruelly killed by the Romans. Omah takes Joel to Jesus; but to Joel's disappointment, Jesus does not choose him as a disciple. Omah recruits Joel for an underground movement fighting for the liberation of Israel.

In Jerusalem, Joel meets Prince Manean and is educated by him for six months. While performing a mission, he saves the Egyptian dancer Myra from the advances of Manean's servant Toron. Joel and Myra fall in love.

Manean plans an action against the Romans for the approaching Passover celebration . He gives Joel the name Barabbas, as he proposes to rob the necessary money from the expected pilgrims. A little later, Dismas also joins the group around Manean.

When Toron betrays Barabbas to the Romans, Barabbas escapes and kills Toron. Myra suggests Manean use Toron's funeral to escape together. Soon Barabbas is wanted by the Romans as a robber. A little later, Barabbas is caught in a robbery; Myra is coming.

At the same time, Pontius Pilate is presented Jesus as a prisoner accused of blasphemy. Pilate can not blame him, but the people demand Jesus' crucifixion. Pilate leaves the people the choice of whether to pardon Jesus or Barabbas on the occasion of the Passover feast; the people choose Barabbas. Finally, Pilate gives in to the people and condemns Jesus; Barabbas' accomplices Gestas and Dismas are crucified together with Jesus. Shaken, Barabbas follows Jesus' crucifixion on Golgotha . Jesus is mocked by those present; only Dismas holds to him.

After Barabbas' ship is shipwrecked during the storm, Barabbas is taken to Irene, who now has a son named Joel. Irene tells Barabbas of Jesus' resurrection and ascension. She and Stephen were later baptized; Stephen was stoned by the Romans for his faith. Shortly before leaving, Barabbas Irene admits that he once loved her.

In Antioch, Barabbas meets Manean, who has converted to Christianity; Barabbas also becomes a Christian. On his journey with Paul Barabbas is arrested and imprisoned. On the occasion of the death of King Herod Agrippa Barabbas has the prospect of being pardoned.

== Cast ==
- Al Carter as Joel / Barabbas
- Joan DeVolk as Myra
- Katherine Helmond as Irene
- George Hennix as Omah
- Bob Jones Jr. as Pontius Pilate
- Bob Jones III as Dismas
- Robert Pratt as Jonathan
- David Yearick as Prince Manaen
- Harvey Maddrix as Toron
- Harold Root as Manaen's Servant
- Claire Baker as Captain
- Harry Brown as Mucius, Roman soldier
- Howard Burns as Joseph
- Jack Buttram as Stephanus
- George Capps as Levi
- Vincent Cervera as Apostle Paul
- Bob Davis as Caesarean prison guard
- Elizabeth Edwards as Maria
- Velma Eubanks as Rebecca
- Dwight Gustafson as Magistrate
- R. K. Johnson as Stephanus' father
- Fannie Mae Jones as Sarah
- Bill Kinkaid as Barnabas
- George Law as Peter
- Bruce Lemmen as Caiaphas
- John Ludwig as Priest
- Melba Jo McKenzie as Claudia's maid
- Fritz Mollenkott as Priest
- Elmer Rumminger as Priest
- James Ryerson as Fremder
- Glenn Schunk as Irenes Vater
- Billy Shelton as Enos
- Clifford Wallace as Zebedee
- Zeb Wolfe as Priest
- Thomas Woodward as Herod Agrippa
- Bob Kendall as Longinus, Roman soldier
- Dan Dunkelberger as Vinicius, Roman soldier
- Jon Formo as Vestus, Roman soldier
- Roy Lichtenwalter as Sextus, Roman soldier
- Barry Thomas as: Marcus, Roman soldier
- Glenn Zachary as Octavus, Roman soldier

== Production ==
The film was created with the participation of students and staff of Bob Jones University. The basis was the novel Wine of Morning of the University President, Bob Jones, Jr., 1950, who had long been planning to write a novel about Barabbas, but did not find the time to write until a pleurisy forced him into the hospital bed for two months. Six months later, the novel was completed. The novel was finally filmed by Unusual Films; Bob Jones Jr. took over the role of Pontius Pilatus.

Wine of Morning was featured at the International Congress of Motion's Picture and Television School Directors at the Cannes International Film Festival. It was the first film to win the four major awards from the National Evangelical Film Foundation.

Wine of Morning was Katherine Helmond's film debut.
