= Katherine Stenholm =

American film director

Katherine Corne Stenholm (June 19, 1917 – November 3, 2015) was an American film director and the founding director of Unusual Films, the production company of Bob Jones University.

== Biography ==
Katherine Corne was born and reared in Hendersonville, North Carolina. As a high school student during the Depression, she supplemented her family's income by writing movie reviews for a local newspaper. Rejecting a college scholarship to Wellesley, Corne attended the fledgling Bob Jones College in Cleveland, Tennessee, after an evangelist convinced her that a Christian young person should attend a Christian college. At BJC, she majored in speech and became a private student of Bob Jones Jr., eventually helping him direct Shakespearean plays. After earning her undergraduate degree, she served on the BJC speech faculty while attending graduate school at Northwestern University for twelve summers. During this period she married Gilbert R. Stenholm (1915–89), who became an influential administrator at the institution; they had one son.

In 1950, after the college moved to Greenville and became Bob Jones University, Bob Jones Sr. and Jr. asked Stenholm to head a newly conceived campus film production company, Unusual Films. Stenholm then attended summer film school at the University of Southern California, making important professional contacts and serving an internship with Stanley Kramer. Stenholm was a quick learner and soon "became one of only a handful of women in the United States to direct feature films." Through her career she produced seventy-two films of various types including sermon films, religious documentaries, promotional films, and multi-image presentations. She directed five feature-length religious films, all costume dramas:

- Wine of Morning
- Red Runs the River
- Flame in the Wind
- Sheffey
- Beyond the Night.

The National Evangelical Film Foundation named Stenholm Director of the Year in 1953, 1955, and 1963; and her favorite film, Sheffey, received a Silver Medallion award from the International Film and Television Festival of New York.

In 1958, at the height of the Cold War, the University Film Producers Association selected Wine of Morning as its submission to the International Congress of Motion Picture and Television School Directors at the Cannes Film Festival, and Stenholm was the keynote speaker on the occasion. A U.S. State Department official who briefed Stenholm told her there had been a round of applause when the Department discovered that BJU had been chosen to represent the United States because "Bob Jones University is one school about which there is no worry!" The selection committee thought Wine of Morning would demonstrate the excellence of American cinema training and the film's frank religious message would "provide a revealing contrast to the entries from Russia and the other Communist-dominated countries."

In 1986, Stenholm suffered a stroke in the Soviet Union while taking scenic footage in preparation for another feature-length film. She retired as director of Unusual Films but continued to teach at BJU until 2001. Stenholm died in November 2015 at the age of 98.
