= Walter Fremont =

American Academic

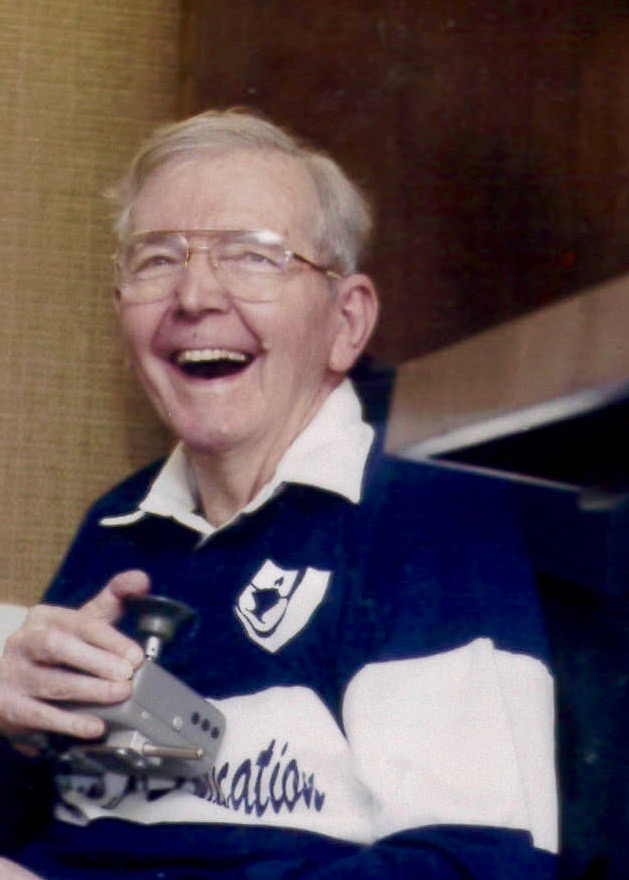
- Fremont c. 2000
- Born: July 20, 1924; Terre Haute, Illinois, U.S.
- Died: January 7, 2007 (aged 82); Greenville, South Carolina, U.S.
- Resting place: Graceland East Memorial Park, Greenville, South Carolina
- Education: University of Dayton; University of Wisconsin-Madison; Penn State University
- Occupation: educator
- Employer: Bob Jones University
- Title: Dean, School of Education
- Political party: Republican
- Board member of: The Wilds
- Spouse: Gertrude Reed

Walter Gilbert Fremont Jr. (July 20, 1924 – January 7, 2007) was dean of the School of Education, Bob Jones University (1953–1990) and "a seminal force in the inauguration and development of the Christian school movement."

== Youth and education ==
Fremont was born in Terre Haute, Indiana, but was largely reared in Wilmette, Illinois, and Southern Hills, a suburb of Dayton, Ohio. A child of the Depression, Fremont remembered his family having a maid before the crash but afterward having too little money to buy coal. Eventually the senior Fremont scrabbled back to economic prosperity and by doing so helped to inculcate in his son a belief in persistence, that "once you start something, you don't quit."

As a child, Fremont was popular, athletic, and mechanically inclined. During World War II, he was drafted and assigned by the Army to study mechanical engineering at Carnegie Institute of Technology. He then served as an engineering instructor and later as the supervisor of a mobile machine shop in Europe.

Following his discharge, Fremont earned an education degree from the University of Dayton (1947) and a Master of Science in curriculum development from the University of Wisconsin (1949). In 1947 he married Gertrude Reed, a nursing student; they had three children.

== Teacher and administrator ==
Fremont became an evangelical Christian in 1941. Even as a teenager, he made an interdenominational Bible study the focus of his spiritual and social life. In 1950, with one year of GI Bill benefits remaining, Fremont decided to study Bible at fundamentalist Bob Jones University in Greenville, South Carolina, because of the university's reputation for "instilling soul-winning fervor" into its students. Fremont was immediately asked to teach educational psychology and taught both semesters while taking thirty hours of Bible courses.

The following year he became a full-time member of the education faculty eventually teaching courses in psychology, counseling, and educational administration. Fremont was a popular teacher, humorous, dramatic, acrobatic, and wildly enthusiastic. Meanwhile, he also taught Sunday school, engaged in street preaching, and held Bible studies at a local high school. While teaching psychology, he would often privately ask a student to open an envelope in class, create a disturbance, and run out the door. Fremont would then question the class about their perceptions of the staged incident.

In 1953, during a period of upheaval at BJU, Fremont was appointed Dean of the School of Education. He was 29 and served as dean for thirty-seven years. From 1953 to 1959, Fremont worked on his doctorate at Pennsylvania State University during the summers. He completed his dissertation in about three months by writing from six in the evening until two in the morning. Fremont eventually helped expand the "meager offerings" of the BJU education department at his arrival into full-scale elementary, secondary, and graduate programs.

== Proponent of Christian education ==
Fremont's dissertation outlined principles of administration in evangelical Protestant Christian schools, a tiny segment of the educational world in the 1950s but his burden for the rest of his career. Fremont became an early mainstay of BJU Press in a successful effort to make Bob Jones University a leader in the new Christian school movement. Bob Jones III called Fremont "the John Dewey of Christian primary and secondary education," and Keith Wiebe, president of the American Association of Christian Schools referred to him as a man with a "contagious passion for Christian education." Fremont's successor as dean estimated that during Fremont's tenure the percentage of BJU education graduates who entered Christian school teaching rose from 5% to 90%.

Fremont differentiated traditional education, with its emphasis on rote memory, from Christian education, which he believed should emphasize Bible principles. Arlin Horton, founder of Pensacola Christian College, accused Fremont of promoting progressive education, and although Horton and Fremont remained personal friends, their educational philosophies diverged during the 1970s, a separation mirrored in the textbooks published by BJU Press and Horton's A Beka Book.

Fremont helped found a Children's Gospel Club in Greenville and served on the executive committee of a Greenville-based mission board. But he claimed that his most effective ministry occurred in camp settings, believing that the camping environment—one that brought people into God's creation and separated them from normal distractions—was the best place for communicating spiritual truth. In 1967, he and longtime friend, Ken Hay helped found The Wilds with Carl Blythe and Joe Henson. Fremont served on the board of directors for twenty-eight years and often spoke at couple's retreats, which were always completely booked.

== Illness and death ==
In 1986, Fremont was diagnosed with amyotrophic lateral sclerosis (Lou Gehrig's disease) and given two to five years to live. He continued to serve as dean until 1990, taught from a wheelchair for one more year, and then survived fifteen years more, co-authoring several books from his hospital bed. The Wilds dedicated a Fremont Inn in 1992, and Bob Jones University named the Fremont Fitness Center in his honor in 1993. In January 2007, Fremont died less than a hundred yards away from the Fitness Center.

== Books ==
- Formula for Family Unity: A Practical Guide for Christian Families (1980) (with Trudy Fremont) ISBN 0-89084-122-5.
- Forming a New Generation: A Practical Guide for Youth Leaders (1990) (with Trudy and Gilbert Fremont) ISBN 0-89084-511-5
- Becoming an Effective Christian Counselor (1996) (with Trudy Fremont) ISBN 0-89084-890-4
- Rambunctious Rattler (1999) (with Susan W. Young), juvenile fiction ISBN 1-57924-262-6
- Power to Serve: Living a Joyful Spirit-filled Life (2002) (with Carson K. Fremont) ISBN 978-1-57924-758-4
