= Les Ollila =

Leslie John Ollila
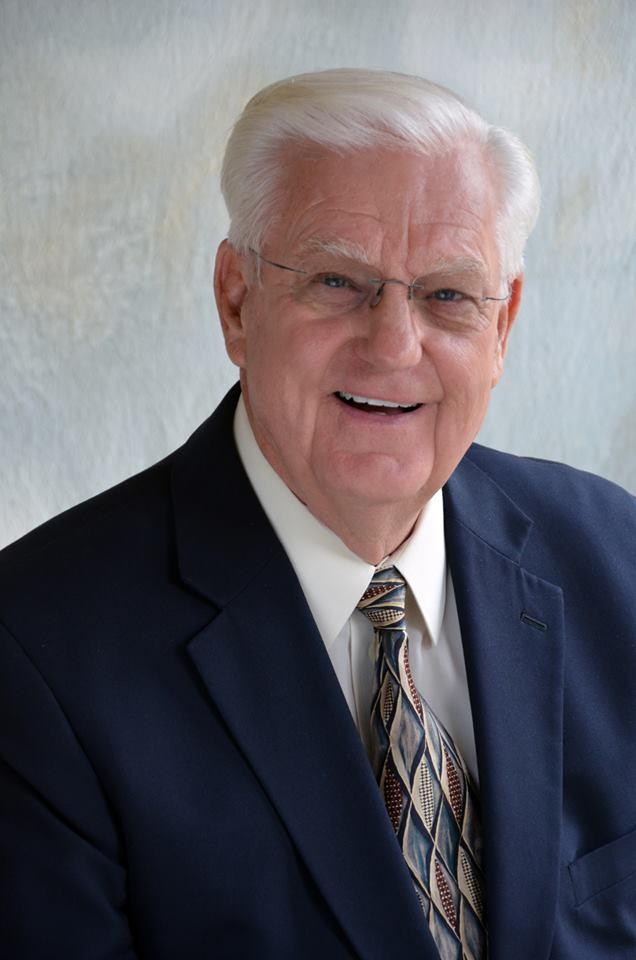
- Ollila in 2018
- Born: March 22, 1943 (age 82); Gratiot Location, Houghton County, Michigan, U.S.

Leslie John Ollila (born March 22, 1943) is an evangelist who served as the second president (1984-2002) and then chancellor (2002-2013) of Northland Baptist Bible College (1976-2015), later Northland International University.

== Biography ==
Ollila was born to Finnish parents in Gratiot Location, Houghton County, Michigan, a copper-mining company town in the Upper Peninsula. At the time, Gratiot was a rough-and-tumble place where drinking was the "main problem."

Ollila became an outstanding athlete on the Calumet High School football and track teams and was devoted to hunting, trapping, and heavy machinery. During his high school years, Ollila experienced a religious conversion under the mentoring of Pastor Charles Hart of the First Baptist Church of Calumet. After graduating from high school in 1961, Ollila worked in the logging industry and as a tree topper; but moving to Detroit, he "surrendered his life…to be a preacher."

Following his future wife to Bob Jones University, he overcame a speech impediment and gained the respect of his work supervisors as a hard worker and natural leader. Ollila served as an interim minister at a Baptist mission church in an area of Greenville known as Bootleg Corner. After graduation, he became youth pastor at Calvary Baptist Church, Roseville, Michigan (1968–75), where he proved to be charismatic youth counselor and evangelist. He later served as an evangelist with Life Action Ministries.

In 1984, having impressed inventor and businessman, Paul Patz (1911–2000), the founder of Northland Baptist Bible College, Dunbar, Wisconsin, Ollila was offered the presidency of the small school. During his term of office (1984–2002), the school grew from 125 to over 600 students.

In 2013, Ollila began "Building Great Leaders," a "ministry emphasizing servant leadership to pastors, churches, colleges and other Christian ministries both in the U.S. and overseas."

== Books ==
- Reclaiming Authentic Fundamentalism by Douglas R. McLachlan and Les Ollila (1993)
- Manna: A Daily Devotional by Les Ollila, Kraig Keck and Shannon Brown (Jan 1, 2002)
- God's Glory in Clay Pots by Les Ollila, Sam Horn and Kitty Foth-Regner (Sep 1, 2009)
- Manna: a Daily Devotional Guide by Les Ollila (1977)
- Proteens: Top Priority Manna: A Daily Devotional. Book 2 (Top Priority Manna) by Les Ollila (2003)
- Foundation: For youth programs by Les Ollila (1981)
