= Robert N. Schaper =

American preacher and theologian

Robert Newell Schaper (February 4, 1922 – September 20, 2007) was an American evangelical preacher and theologian who served as dean of the chapel and Arthur DeKruyter/Christ Church Oak Brook Professor of Preaching and Practical Theology at Fuller Theological Seminary.

== Early life and education ==
Schaper was born February 4, 1922, in Indianapolis, Indiana. He was educated at The Biblical Seminary in New York, Northern Baptist Theological Seminary, Union Theological Seminary, Winona Lake School of Theology, and Bob Jones University, eventually earning a Ph.D. in Bible. He was married to Margaret (daughter of Reed Smith and Margaret Dick), with whom he had two sons and a daughter.

== Academic and pastoral career ==
Schaper began his academic career at Bob Jones University, where he served as dean of men, director of religious activities, and dean of the school of religion before resigning in 1952. He moved to California to serve as pastor of Bethany Church of Sierra Madre. In 1967, he joined the faculty at Fuller Seminary, where he later served as dean of the chapel. Schaper was a member of the original translation team for the New American Standard Bible, and served a term as president of the Southwest Region of the National Association of Evangelicals. In 1980, he was ordained in the Episcopal Church and served at Church of Our Saviour in San Gabriel until his retirement in 2001. He died on September 20, 2007, in Aliso Viejo, California at the age of 85.

== Publications ==
- A Historical and Comparative Study of the Self-consciousness of Jesus as Found in the Synoptic Gospels (1944) Bob Jones College
- An Investigation of Supposed Discrepancies in the Gospels in the Light of Verbal Inspiration (1947) Bob Jones University
- Paul's Relations with the Corinthian Church (1964) Fuller Theological Seminary
- The Preaching of John Donne: With an Investigation of Its Mystical and Poetic Elements and Their Place in the Task of Preaching (1973) School of Theology at Claremont
- Why Me God? (1974) ISBN 0830702636
- In His Presence: Appreciating Your Worship Tradition (1984) ISBN 0840758871
