= Harold Ellsworth Crosby =

American architect

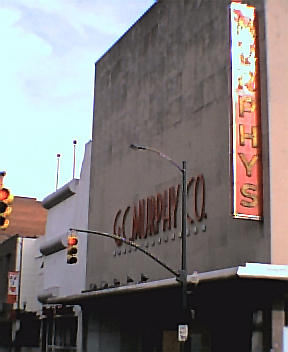
G.C. Murphy's Richmond, Virginia store on Broad Street and Fourth designed by Murphy corporate architect Harold Ellsworth Crosby. It was demolished for a parking lot in 2004.

Harold Ellsworth Crosby (January 22, 1899 – January 12, 1958) was an American architect who supervised the construction of many G. C. Murphy Co. discount department stores across the United States. Born in Maryville, Missouri, he graduated from Iowa State College with a B.A. in 1922. After marrying his wife, Lydia Ferber, in 1924, he traveled in North America, South America, and Europe. Crosby joined G. C. Murphy Co. in the late 1920s and became corporate architect. He served in World War I, and in World War II as a lieutenant colonel under Eisenhower. After returning home, he became vice-president of the construction division of G. C. Murphy from 1947 to 1955 and then became vice-president, Mack Realty Company. He was also a member of the AIA Pittsburgh. He also was the architect for the YMCA Camp named after T. Frank Soles.

Crosby's office was at 531 Fifth Avenue, McKeesport, Pennsylvania; his home, 1512 Manor Avenue, McKeesport. He died at the age of 58 on January 12, 1958, in Rockwood, Somerset County, Pennsylvania (Camp Soles), and was survived by his wife, Lydia, now deceased.

His Art Deco style store in downtown Richmond, Virginia, was demolished in 2004.
