= G. C. Murphy =

American chain of variety stores

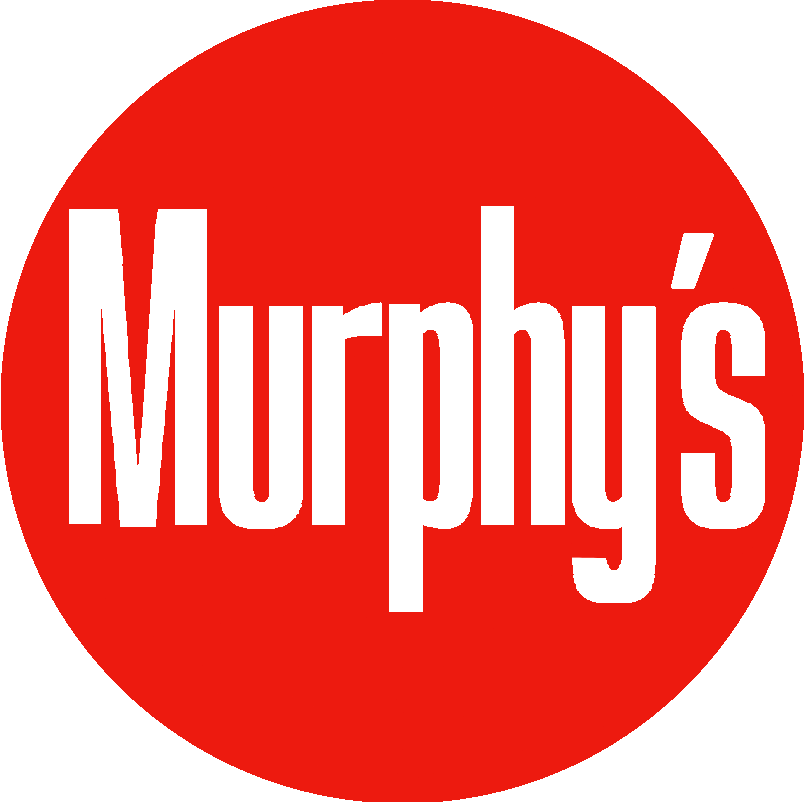

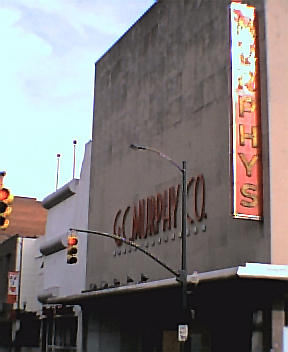
- G.C. Murphy's Richmond, Virginia, store on Broad Street and Fourth was designed by Murphy corporate architect Harold Ellsworth Crosby. In 2004, it was demolished to make way for a parking lot.
- Industry: 5&10 Variety Stores
- Founded: 1906
- Founder: George Clinton Murphy
- Defunct: 2002
- Fate: Acquired by Ames, later McCrory
- Headquarters: McKeesport, Pennsylvania
- Number of locations: 298 (1989)
- Subsidiaries: Bargain World, Terry and Ferris, Bruners, Cobbs

G.C. Murphy was a chain of five and dime or variety stores in the United States from 1906 to 2002. They also operated Murphy's Mart (full-scale discount stores), Bargain World (closeout merchandise), Terry & Ferris and Bruners (junior department stores), and Cobbs (specialty apparel) stores.

In April 1985, the company was acquired by Ames Department Stores Inc. Ames converted many of the larger "Murphy's Mart" stores and in 1989, sold the variety store division to former competitor McCrory Stores.

== History ==
=== Origins of chain ===
The chain was founded in 1906 by George Clinton Murphy in the Pittsburgh suburb of McKeesport, Pennsylvania. Murphy had gotten his start in retail as a manager of a McCrory's store in 1896. Murphy later moved to Detroit, Michigan, to manage several stores there and then returned to the Pittsburgh, Pennsylvania, area to launch his stores. His namesake chain was founded in 1906. It was one of several large retailers that originated in Pennsylvania.

Murphy died in April 1909, three years after the chain's launch. Two former McCrory executives, John Sephus Mack and Walter C. Shaw, bought the G.C. Murphy chain, which was at the time about 12 stores, that same year. The chain quickly expanded through new stores and the purchase of competitors, growing to 173 stores by 1932.

Murphy's expanded cautiously during the 1920s, letting it cope with the Great Depression better than other retailing chains: Sales in 1930 were reported to have risen about 9% ($17 million). By 1932, however, sales had dropped 3.7%. The retailing company never let go of their employees during this time, although they did have to get rid of overtime pay and dock employees for absences.

=== Overview of features ===
Murphy's stores became popular partly because of their locations; many were in small and large-sized towns that had previously been served only by stores owned by whatever mining company was based there. The lunch counters in the stores were a popular destination for quick and inexpensive meals (before the rise of fast food). Murphy's stores were designed in-house and to a high standard, led by architects like Harold Ellsworth Crosby.

=== Growth and expansion ===
G.C. Murphy expanded through the 1950s by acquiring 91 Morris stores in the Midwest and 92 Morgan & Lindsey stores in the South and Southwest. The chain also began testing more prominent locations, opening a significant location at Cermak Plaza in Berwyn, Illinois, in 1957. When company President James Stephen Mack (son of John Sephus Mack) died in 1968, the chain was up to 511 stores. In 1970, it opened its first large-scale store, branded as "Murphy's Mart," in Pittsburgh, Pennsylvania. The stores were similar in size and concept to Kmart and were often located in the suburbs. By 1980, they had grown to 448 stores.

=== Changes and suspension of business ===
In April 1985, the company was acquired by Ames Department Stores Inc. for $48 per share. Ames rebranded many of the larger "Murphy's Mart" stores. In 1989, Ames sold the G. C. Murphy and Bargain World divisions to E-II Holdings, parent of McCrory's, to help offset debt incurred during their recent acquisition of Zayre. The McCrory's chain filed for bankruptcy in 1992, closed many of its stores (including former G.C. Murphy's outlets) in 1997 and ceased its remaining operations in 2002.

== Current activities ==
Although the stores ceased business operations some time ago, the chain's foundation, the G.C. Murphy Foundation, still exists. Retirees and former employees of the stores have a volunteer organization that allows them to keep in touch.

In 2005, the Pittsburgh Post-Gazette reported that the Murphy Foundation had commissioned a writer to compile the G.C. Murphy Company's history. That history, titled For the Love of Murphy's: The Behind-the-Counter Story of a Great American Retailer, by Jason Togyer, was published in 2008 by Pennsylvania State University Press.
