= BJU Press =

University press

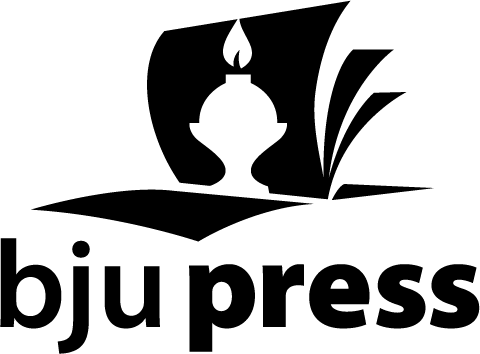
- Founded: 1973
- Founder: Bob Jones University
- Headquarters: Greenville, SC
- Parent: BJUEG (BJU Education Group)
- Website: bjupress.com

BJU Press is a publisher of textbooks for Christian schools and homeschools as well as trade and children's books.

== History ==
Although Bob Jones University published its first trade book, A History of Fundamentalism in America by George W. Dollar in 1973, BJU Press originated in the need for textbooks in the burgeoning Christian school movement. Walter Fremont, Dean of the School of Education, was an "enthusiastic supporter," and much of the early academic direction of the press was provided by the university's provost, Philip D. Smith. The press also published the university's magazine, Faith for the Family from 1973 until it was discontinued in 1986.

The first textbook published by BJU Press was Physical Science for Christian Schools (1974), written by George Mulfinger and Emmet Williams. Initially the press had planned to publish only a few texts in areas where philosophical disagreement with secular texts was substantial, but shortly the press developed a full range of K-12 texts and materials. An early decision was that BJU Press would not simply repackage secular texts, as its competitors had done, but would create new books from a Christian viewpoint.

As the homeschool movement began to grow in the 1980s, the press decided to begin selling its publications to homeschool families. This marketing strategy proved so successful that by 1988, BJU Press was the largest textbook supplier to homeschool families in the nation. It also provides testing, record-keeping and consulting services. Now, BJU Press primarily uses the Homeschool Hub as an all-in-one platform for homeschooling, which includes planning, grading, and accessing video lessons.

== Current status and divisions ==
BJU Press is the largest book publisher in South Carolina, and more than a million pre-college students around the world use BJU textbooks. The press also publishes trade books under two imprints. JourneyForth publishes Christian living titles and Bible studies for adults as well as biographies and fiction for children and teens, including wholesome books with no specific Christian references. JourneyForth Academic (formerly Bob Jones University Press) puts out ministry-related books and scholarly works. In 2006 the press had approximately 2,500 titles in print.

BJU Press "controls every aspect of publication with in-house authors, editors, compositors, computer and board artists, photo editors, page designers and its own presses," and many of its employees have worked for BJU Press for more than twenty years. In 2009, the chief publication officer, William Apelian, said, "The cornerstone of our philosophy is a Christian worldview, call it Bible integration. That's why we have control of the entire process."

== Criticism ==
In August 2008, the Association of Christian Schools International filed suit against the University of California (Association of Christian Schools International et al. v. Roman Stearns et al.) for refusing to grant high school credits for courses taken using certain BJU Press texts. U. S. District Court judge S. James Otero accepted the argument of two University of California professors that the text United States History for Christian Schools was inadequate because it claimed that the Bible was "the unerring source for analysis of historical events," attributed "historical events to divine providence rather than analyzing human action," and provided "inadequate treatment of several major ethnic groups, women and non-Christian religious groups." The judge also ruled that the book did not "encourage critical thinking skills and failed to cover 'major topics, themes and components' of U.S. history."

In 2012, The Herald of Glasgow said that BJU Press textbooks had praised aspects of the Ku Klux Klan for fighting against immorality and using the symbol of the cross, claimed dinosaurs were fire-breathing dragons, and that homosexuality is a learned behavior. According to a 2013 article in The Atlantic, some evangelical homeschoolers had rejected BJU Press materials in favor of Christian textbooks that accepted evolution.

== See also ==
- List of English-language book publishing companies
- List of university presses
