= The Wilds Christian Association =

American Protestant Christian organization

The Wilds Christian Association, Inc.
- Type: Private
- Industry: Camping; Retreats
- Founded: 1969
- Founder: Ken Hay
- Headquarters: Brevard, North Carolina
- Key people: Ken Hay; Ken Collier; Matt Collier; Rand Hummel; John Bott; Steve Stodola; Chris Anastos; Willie Partin; Joe Kopp; Noah Smith; Matt Taylor
- Website: wilds.org

The Wilds Christian Association, Inc. is a Christian organization, based in Brevard, North Carolina, United States. The organization was founded by a group of Christians at Bob Jones University who recognized the need for a Christian camp in the Southeastern United States. In 1967, the group purchased a 1,000 acres (4.0 km^{2}) property near Brevard, North Carolina and established The Wilds Christian Camp and Conference Center (commonly referred to as "The Wilds") about two years later. Today, The Wilds is one of the largest Christian camps in the United States. About 21,000 people attend annual retreats, while summer camp averages 1,100 to 1,200 campers per week.

The Wilds of the Rockies opened in 1987 near Kremmling, Colorado, though the property was sold in 2004 and converted to a residential development. A third camp, The Wilds of New England, was established in Deering, New Hampshire in 2009. Additionally, CampsAbroad was founded in 2001, which is an international program assisting Christian camping ministries in 40 countries. The Wilds Christian Association is supported by more than 300 churches, and more than 250,000 campers have attended its summer camp programs. The Wilds has a year-round staff of forty and a summer staff of about 270.

== Beliefs ==
The Chapel at the Fremont Inn

The Wilds is a conservative, fundamentalist organization. Although not affiliated with any denomination, many sponsors are Independent Baptist and Bible churches.

The Wilds mission statement is succinctly stated in the camp verse: "Whether therefore ye eat, or drink, or whatsoever ye do, do all to the glory of God" (1 Corinthians 10:31). The Wilds seeks to evangelize non-Christian campers and encourage spiritual growth among Christian campers by combining Bible study, personal discipleship, and religious services with recreational activity.

== Camping ministries ==
=== North Carolina ===
The Wilds of North Carolina is located near Rosman, North Carolina (with a mailing address in Brevard). The camp property contains approximately 1,000 acres (4.0 km^{2}) of land through which Toxaway Creek flows. Four main waterfalls on the Toxaway are on The Wilds property and are common hiking destinations for campers.

==== History ====
In the late 1960s, a group of people recognized the need for a Christian camp in the Southeastern United States. In 1967, the group discovered the property in Transylvania County, North Carolina, and first incorporated as "Hemlock Hills Christian Association" because of the abundance of hemlock trees on the property. Then someone recalled Socrates' death from drinking hemlock, and they decided to call the camp "The Wilds," a reflection of Jesus having urged His disciples to rest awhile in a secluded place. (Mark 6:31) Although the group had few resources, they eventually obtained funds to purchase the 810-acre tract of land in Transylvania County, North Carolina. By 1969, The Wilds was established by Ken Hay, Walter Fremont, Joe Henson, and Carl D. Blyth Sr., who knew each other from their association at Bob Jones University.

==== Facilities ====
The camp is one of the largest Christian camps in the United States. During the summer, the camp averages between 1,100 and 1,200 campers each week. Throughout the rest of the year the camp hosts specialized retreats that attract 21,000 attendees annually.

The campsite facilities include staff residences, an inn and chapel, dormitory and craft shop, cabins, dining hall, main office building, and a large multi-purpose building (used as an indoor basketball venue and a 1,300-seat auditorium). The property includes a man-made lake, Toxaway Creek and waterfalls, basketball courts, and athletic fields. There are also several leisure activities available such as a water slide, land trolley (zip-line), and a 65-foot (20 m) "Giant Swing."

First Falls (top) and Second Falls (bottom)

Fourth Falls

The Wilds section of Toxaway Creek has several waterfalls, which are numbered going downstream.

- "The Shoals"
  35°4′43.2″N 82°52′17.5″W
- First Falls
  35°4′40.4″N 82°52′27.3″W
- Second Falls
  35°4′41.7″N 82°52′32″W
- Third Falls
  35°4′39.9″N 82°52′36.6″W
- Fourth Falls
  35°4′35″N 82°52′39.5″W

=== Colorado ===
The Wilds of the Rockies opened in 1987 near Kremmling, Colorado and operated near Rabbit Ears Pass and Muddy Pass until it was closed in 2004 due to community issues. The Wilds sold the property to longtime supporters Jeff and Linda Peotter, and the property became a residential development.

=== New Hampshire ===
In 2007, camp operations began at The Wilds of New England (TWNE) at rented facilities. The Wilds purchased land by Lake Winnipesaukee, near Meredith, but securing permits was difficult and "the property, though beautiful, was near enough to the town to bring a number of disadvantages." In 2009, the Meredith property was sold, and The Wilds assumed the mortgage of another camp property in Deering, New Hampshire. In 2007, the Board appointed Rand Hummel, assistant director of The Wilds in North Carolina, as the director of The Wilds of New England. After the COVID-19 pandemic forced The Wilds of New England to close facilities to campers for the year, TWNE provided one-day camps across New England, New York, and Pennsylvania. In 2022, Rand Hummel became Wilds regional vice president, and Joe Kopp took his place as director.

=== International ===
CampsAbroad is a worldwide consulting program used by The Wilds to assist the cause of Christian camping around the world. The program is designed to help already established camps, as well as churches who want to start new camping ministries. Training and materials are provided to ministries at no charge, but The Wilds name is not used by these camping ministries outside the United States.

== Products ==
The Wilds produces Bible study guides, topical studies, songbooks, recorded music, and books of activity ideas for church youth groups. The Wilds is noted for its recordings of conservative Christian music produced by camp staff.
