= John Sephus Mack =

American businessman and philanthropist

John Sephus Mack (March 9, 1880 – September 27, 1940), was an American businessperson and philanthropist. He was the president of the G. C. Murphy Company, a prominent variety-store chain during the early 20th century.

== Biography ==
Mack was the son of a farmer and educated in the public schools of Indiana County, Pennsylvania and at a business college in Johnstown. "Seph" Mack began his career as a stock room clerk at McCrory Stores in Johnstown, Pennsylvania, which was owned by his cousin, J. G. McCory. By 1908, Mack had become general manager.

In 1911, he and another employee, Walter C. Shaw, resigned from McCrory and purchased G.C. Murphy Co., McKeesport, Pennsylvania, which owned about a dozen “five and dime” stores near Pittsburgh but which had begun to fail after the premature death of its founder in 1909. Mack became president and chairman of the board in 1912, and after some years of struggle turned the failing company around. The Murphy Company improved its position during the Great Depression, and from 1929 to 1934, sales increased from $15.7 million to $28 million. By 1934, there were 181 Murphy Co. stores in eleven states and Washington, D.C. At one point, Murphy Company was the third-largest variety-store chain in the country.

Employee benefits included free life insurance, two weeks paid vacation, and Christmas bonuses of up to $15 in gold. Only a few Murphy stores were organized by unions, "partially because of intense antiunion campaigns mounted by management, but, more importantly, because many of G. C. Murphy's twenty-three thousand employees didn't feel the need for protection from a company they viewed as benevolent and even generous."

Mack enjoyed maintaining and enlarging his family farm, Old Home Manor, and frequently spent his weekends tending show horses and Black Angus cattle. But he also did that to better serve his community. As a philanthropist and community booster, he donated the Ralph Gibson McGill Library to Westminster College, New Wilmington, Pennsylvania. He bought local homes in disrepair, fixed them, and rented them out. He set up a fund for the upkeep of the local cemetery, established a trust fund to care for indigent hospital patients, and gave the hospital $115,000 to build a maternity wing in memory of his parents. He also stocked some of his own 1,700 acres (6.9 km^{2}) with deer and buffalo. J. S. Mack Community Park in Indiana, Pennsylvania, the central gathering place of the town, continues to operate with funds from the J. S. Mack Foundation.

A devout Presbyterian who decorated the main assembly room of the Murphy Company with Bible verses, Mack first met Bob Jones, Sr., founder of Bob Jones College (now Bob Jones University) while serving on the organizing committee for a 1927 revival campaign in McKeesport. Mack was impressed with Jones and told him that he planned to put his “shoulder to the wheel and help you in a big way." Shortly before his death, Mack went so far as to tell Jones to "construct your buildings and send me the bill." Bob Jones College awarded Mack an honorary degree and named the library in his honor. A women's residence hall in Greenville, South Carolina is named for his wife.

== Death and interment ==
Although Mack was only 60 in 1940, his health gave way, and he died after a stroke on September 27. Four colleges sent their choirs, and Bob Jones delivered the eulogy at the funeral.
