= Christian radio =

Category of radio formats

Christian radio refers to Christian media radio formats that focus on Christian religious broadcasting or various forms of Christian music. Many such formats and programs include contemporary Christian music, gospel music, sermons, radio dramas, as well as news and talk shows covering popular culture, economics, and political topics from a Christian perspective. It encompasses various denominations of Christianity.

== History ==
=== American evangelicalism ===
In the first part of the 20th century, American revivalists saw radio as a tool for spreading the gospel. Christian radio pioneers included Aimee Semple McPherson, D. L. Moody, Charles E. Fuller, Donald Barnhouse, Walter A. Maier, Paul Rader, Lightfoot Solomon Michaux, and Percy Crawford.

In addition to preaching and sermons, other content such as news, children's programs, and gospel music were broadcast. Scholar Leah Payne states "In the 1920s, [Christian] broadcasters featured gospel quartets and trios who upheld the traditional social order and contrasted with images of 'bright young things' and flappers." Patriotism during the World Wars, teetotalism, and youth ministry were also common topics, and American celebrity culture spread to Christian radio, making celebrities of radio revivalists. Youth for Christ founder Torrey Johnson's radio program brought evangelist Billy Graham to American homes, helping launch his career.

Christian radio was also used to encourage political action; major broadcasters such as CBS and NBC, however, aired mainline Protestant content and avoided controversial themes. While Catholics, Jews, and mainline Protestants had their own broadcast organizations, various evangelical groups and fundamentalists banded together to form National Religious Broadcasters, which "spread conservative, white political views and premillennial dispensational theology". With its ability to reach significant numbers of people for potentially hours each day, at home and away, Christian radio had a formative impact on the direction of Christian media.

=== Catholic church ===
The Second Vatican Council's Decree on the Media of Social Communications (1963) sought to promote, "where it may be necessary", the establishment of Catholic radio and television stations.

== Business models ==
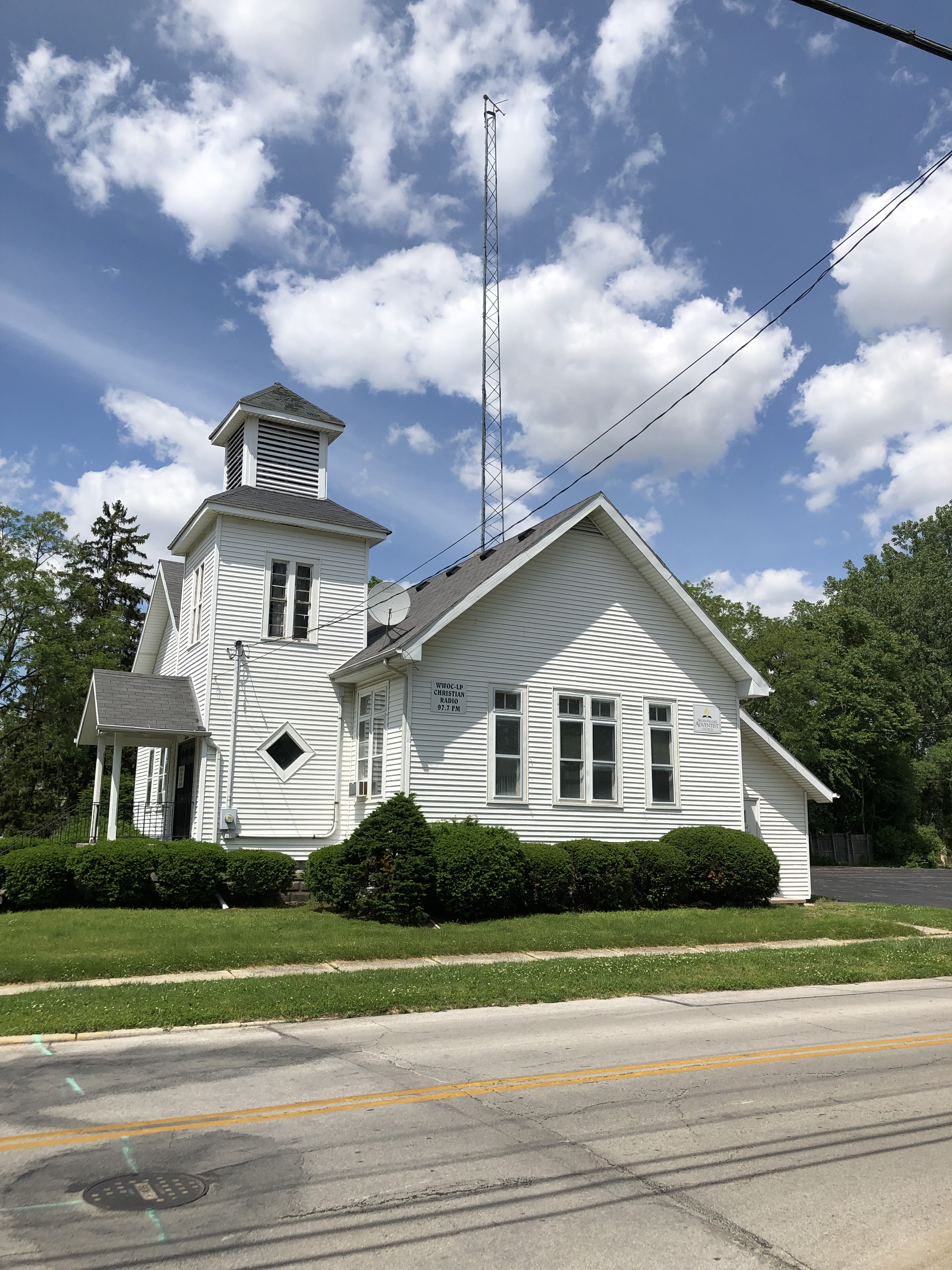
A church with its own radio station

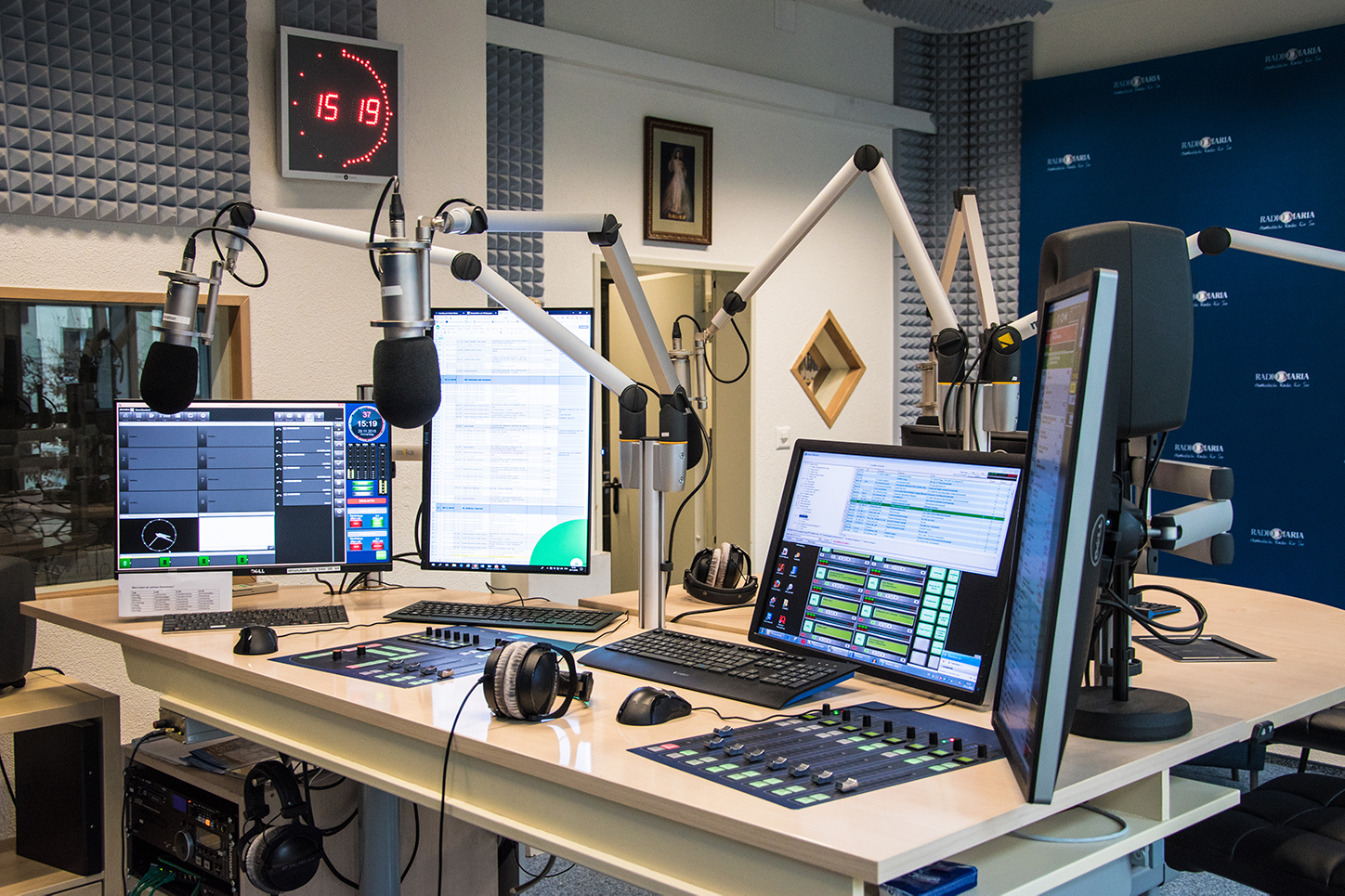
Radio Maria studio in Switzerland.

Brokered programming is a significant portion of most U.S. Christian radio stations' revenue, with stations regularly selling blocks of airtime to evangelists seeking an audience. Another revenue stream is solicitation of donations, either to the evangelists who buy the air time or to the stations or their owners themselves. In order to further encourage donations, certain evangelists may emphasize the prosperity gospel, in which they preach that tithing and donations to the ministry will result in financial blessings from God. Others may have special days of the year dedicated to fundraising, similar to many NPR stations. Although the solicitation of donations and the sale of airtime may resemble a commercial enterprise, such actions do not necessarily constitute a call to action, and thus this does not forbid them from airing on noncommercial licensed stations in the U.S. A minority of stations, typically music stations, use the traditional model for music radio and allow traditional commercial advertising.

Numerous religious broadcasters own many of their own stations. In the U.S., religious radio stations are exempt from certain rules requiring radio stations to have some local operations, which allows them to have massive networks of transmitters covering far larger areas than a radio station would otherwise be allowed and may not face the same restrictions on the number of signals a broadcaster can own within one geographic area.

== Radio formats ==
Most Christian radio stations transmit a mixture of Christian music and Christian talk and teaching.

=== Christian music ===
Christian music radio outlets mirror commercial radio in many ways, and music in a variety of different genres is available. Many stations play primarily gospel music, including Black Gospel and Southern Gospel, or contemporary worship music, while others play all formats of contemporary Christian music, including Christian pop, Christian rock, Christian rap, Christian country music, and Christian alternative rock. Many artists within the Christian music industry criticize Christian radio for only playing "safe" music, and not taking enough chances on new artists, or in some cases older artists, that may not be as appealing to the largely conservative Gospel Music Association.

Many non-religious radio stations devote some of their weekend programming to Christian music; for example, Black Gospel programming is common on Sundays on many stations featuring the urban contemporary format.

=== Christian talk, radio drama, sermons ===
Other Christian stations will present a no-music format that features talk radio-style programming (sometimes including live radio call-in shows) and/or long-form "preaching and teaching" programs. Notable examples include Focus on the Family with host Jim Daly, Amazing Facts, Living Way with pastor Jack Hayford, and Pastor Rick's Daily Hope; an example of an inspirational program are Moments of Melody and The Voice of Prophecy. Radio drama programs, long dead in most other radio formats, continue to be transmitted on Christian radio; notable examples include long-running Adventures in Odyssey, Patch the Pirate, and Unshackled! and relative newcomers such as Down Gilead Lane and A Work in Progress.

== Denominations ==
Christian radio, particularly in North America, is dominated by Protestant ministries, particularly those associated with evangelical Christianity. The predominant Roman Catholic radio services are the Eternal Word Network, founded by Mother Angelica as a spin-off of her television service EWTN, and Radio Maria USA.

The Church of Jesus Christ of Latter-day Saints, a sect whose place in Christianity is heavily debated, maintains some limited radio evangelical operations through BYU Radio, which owns a single FM station. The Seventh-day Adventists are most closely associated with Three Angels Broadcasting Network.

== North American and international availability ==
Most Christian radio stations as well as programmers based in the United States are members of the National Religious Broadcasters, a Christian organization. There are reportedly 1,600 Christian broadcasting organizations in the U.S. They range from single stations to expansive networks. It is common for religious broadcasters to purchase many small broadcast translators to create networks that stretch across large regions. Moody Radio was the first example, and still one of the largest, though most of its stations broadcast stand-alone programming as well as network feeds. Z88.3 in Orlando, Florida, the WAY-FM Network, K-LOVE, Air 1, The Joy FM, Reach Radio, 3ABN Radio, Radio 74, and the Bible Broadcasting Network are other notable examples in the world.

Christian radio expanded in the early twenty-first century. It became available in the United Kingdom with changes to broadcasting regulations. Premier Christian Radio is based in the London area where it is available on medium wave and DAB; elsewhere, it is available digitally or by Internet. United Christian Broadcasters is an international broadcasting and media company; radio stations are based in Albania, Australia, Canada, Denmark, New Zealand, the Philippines, and the United Kingdom. Trans World Radio is an evangelical media distributor broadcasting Christian programs in 190 countries in more than 300 languages, TWR-UK can be heard in the United Kingdom on Sky, Freeview and online.

== Christian radio programs ==
- Focus on the Family, an internationally syndicated daily interview produced by Focus on the Family
- Adventures in Odyssey, a scripted radio comedy/drama for children produced by Focus on the Family
- Patch the Pirate, a scripted radio musical comedy for children produced by Majesty Music
- Back to the Bible with Woodrow M. Kroll
- Unshackled! produced by Pacific Garden Mission in Chicago

== See also ==
- American Catholic Radio
- Christianity
- Christian media
- Christian pop culture
- Religious broadcasting – information on UK-based Christian TV & Radio, as well as overview of US-based networks.
- Sermonette
- Televangelism - the equivalent in television
- The World Family of Radio Maria
- Category:Christian radio stations
- List of Christian radio stations in Canada
- Islamic radio
