= Mary Lee (singer) =

Scottish singer (1921–2022)

- Born: Mary Ann McDevitt; 13 August 1921; Glasgow, Scotland
- Died: 13 March 2022 (aged 100) Glasgow, Scotland
- Genres: Vocal; jazz; British dance band; traditional pop
- Instruments: Vocals
- Years active: 1935–1994
- Labels: Decca, His Master's Voice, Parlophone

Mary Lee (born Mary Ann McDevitt; 13 August 1921 – 13 March 2022) was a Scottish singer, variety performer and broadcaster whose career spanned the 1930s to the 1990s. She achieved early recognition whilst still a teenager as a vocalist with Roy Fox's dance band, which was one of Britain's most popular in the interwar period. At the time of her death, Lee was the last surviving singer who had been active with the British dance bands in the 1930s, the heyday of their popularity. She later became known in Scottish variety through performing with her husband, comedian Jack Milroy, and presented an award-winning programme on Radio Clyde in the 1990s.

== Early life ==
Mary Ann McDevitt was born into a working-class family on 13 August 1921, in a second floor Glasgow tenement flat on Scotland Road in Kinning Park. She was the first child of Isabella and Willie McDevitt; her mother was a housewife, and her father was a lorry driver for Shell-Mex & BP. McDevitt's younger brother Eddie was born three and a half years later. As a child, she sang along to the bands on the radio at home. She attended Scotland Street Primary School and Lambhill Street School, originally planning to be a hairdresser. Aged ten, she began singing on Saturday nights at a church hall. There were no microphones, so she sang with a megaphone.

== Career ==
=== Dance band singer ===
She began singing at concerts locally, also doing impressions of popular stars like Gracie Fields and Maurice Chevalier. At 13, she read an advert in the local newspaper seeking a girl singer for a competition, and went to the auditions at the Pettigrew & Stephens department store, with the famous dance band leader Roy Fox in charge. She sang "My Kid's a Crooner", and when asked how old she was, claimed to be 14, the age requirement for the contest. At the final, held in the Glasgow Empire Theatre, McDevitt won, being given a prize of five guineas. The orchestra manager asked her to join them on a permanent basis, to which her father responded that she would not be available until her upcoming fourteenth birthday in August 1935.

McDevitt left school that June, and got a job in a slaters' office, before being sent a telegram asking her to join Fox's orchestra at the Streatham Locarno in London. She travelled down to London with a chaperone, and began singing with Fox's band. It was at this time that she began to be known as Mary Lee, with Fox announcing her as Little Mary Lee, which became her trademark. The members of the band were told not to swear in front of her or tell "unsavoury" stories. She joined Fox and his band on tour, returning to her hometown of Glasgow to perform at the Empire. Whilst with the band, she was groomed in speech, dress and manners.

She first recorded with Fox in London on 27 September 1935, aged 14. Lee sang "Mickey's Son And Daughter" and "Truckin'", but both titles were rejected by the record label, Decca. On 14 October, Lee recorded the songs with the band again, and this time, they were released. "Truckin'" had first been introduced by Cora LaRedd at the Cotton Club in New York City; as was the custom of the day, dance bands would record cover versions of popular contemporary songs.

Lee was regularly used as a featured vocalist on the band's recordings, billed on the label as "with Vocal Refrain by Mary Lee". In 1936, Fox began recording for His Master's Voice, and at his first session for the label, Lee sang "(If I Had) Rhythm In My Nursery Rhymes". The following year, by now aged 15, she recorded a duet with one of the band's male singers, Denny Dennis. They covered George Gershwin and Ira Gershwin's "Let's Call The Whole Thing Off", from the contemporary film Shall We Dance, in which it was introduced by Fred Astaire and Ginger Rogers. In June, Lee recorded vocals for Fox's version of "This Year's Kisses", a song by Irving Berlin from the musical film On the Avenue, in which it was introduced by Alice Faye.

She turned 16 in August 1937, and continued working with Fox. In October, she featured on a medley recorded by Fox, "Hit Tunes of the Years 1928-1937", in which she duetted with Sam Browne on "Let's Put Out the Lights and Go to Sleep" and sang "Stormy Weather" as a solo. That year, she was voted by readers of Melody Maker magazine as their "Best Girl Singer", with Vera Lynn in second place behind her. She appeared on BBC Television in its early days, broadcasting from Alexandra Palace, but the primary medium of the day was radio, which Lee also worked in, recording shows with the band for Radio Luxembourg.

In March 1938, Lee recorded vocals for the Fox band's version of "Whistle While You Work", from the film Snow White and the Seven Dwarfs; however, the recording was rejected by HMV, and not issued. The same year, Lee was with Fox when he recorded a number of titles for commercial radio, for a show sponsored by Reckitt's Bath Cubes. At these sessions, Lee recorded several titles, including "The Gypsy in My Soul".

She was featured on Fox's last pre-war recording session on 9 August 1938, in which she sang "You Went To My Head" at a session in London. In all, Lee provided vocals for 30 different songs which were commercially recorded by Fox and his band. She was unaware they were disbanding until she received a telegram asking her to join the orchestra of Jack Payne, another high-profile bandleader. However, she "hated" being with his band: performing "A-Tisket, A-Tasket", Payne told her to stop phrasing her singing like Ella Fitzgerald, who had popularised the song in America. Lee had not even heard Fitzgerald sing the song, and was pleased to leave the band after just three months.

From there, she joined Jack Jackson's band, and later commented that she found Jackson a "joy" to work for. She had gotten tired of touring, however, and left Jackson after staying with him for six months. Lee then began singing at a London club called The Nut House. On one occasion, her pianist was taken ill, and a young George Shearing deputised for him. Lee later said that she was never accompanied as well before or since. Years later, when Shearing was asked which singers had influenced him the most, one he named was Lee.

Still in her teens, Lee's only recording session in her own right was made for Parlophone. Billed as Little Mary Lee, her first solo 78 featured Lee singing "Christopher Robin is Saying His Prayers" (adapted from the poem 'Vespers' by children's author A. A. Milne, who had created the character of Christopher Robin), coupled with "Wynken, Blynken And Nod", accompanied by most of Fox's band. Her second and final solo record paired George H. Clutsam's "Ma Curly Headed Baby" with the Scottish song "My Ain Folk".

=== War and post-war ===
Following the outbreak of the Second World War, Lee was invited to broadcast on Saturday nights with Ambrose and his Orchestra from The May Fair Hotel, which she did for several months. By now, Lee had grown up and needed to be established as an adult artist. During the war, she also sang with The Squadronaires, a Royal Air Force (RAF) dance band. Following a summer season in Dunoon, Lee decided to stay in Scotland, and appeared in comedy sketches for a summer show at the Pavilion Theatre in Glasgow with Tommy Morgan.

She mostly remained in Scotland for the next ten years, but in 1940, she briefly joined a top of the bill variety act, Stars of the Air, appearing with Sam Browne, Max Bacon and Gloria Brent at the Shepherd's Bush Empire for six months. By 1941, she had been called up for wartime service, and enlisted with the Entertainments National Service Association. Lee subsequently sang at Catterick Camp and an RAF base on the south coast, entertaining the troops in England. In March 1941, she was back in Scotland, performing at the Victory Theatre in Paisley when the air raid sirens went off. Lee and her family stayed in the theatre, sheltering from what was the Clydebank Blitz.

It was during the war that Lee "started to take comedy seriously", she later wrote. "I still loved singing, but knew I would always make a good living from comedy. I spent most of the 1940s perfecting the art and also writing scripts." At the Gaiety Theatre in Ayr, she did a singing act and appeared with Dave Willis in sketches. Her work entertaining the troops continued when she was invited by bandleader Harry Roy to go to the Middle East with him. However, in Cairo, she had a nervous breakdown, and had to be hospitalised. Despite this setback, after a while, she got better, and returned to showbusiness. In 1949, she first met the comedian Jack Milroy. They worked together from 1952 onwards, topping the bill for three seasons at the Tivoli Theatre in Aberdeen.

=== Later life ===
Despite being an established star when she met her husband, who was just starting out in entertainment, Lee decided to put family life ahead of her showbusiness career. In later years, BBC broadcaster Alan Dell played Lee's old recordings on his show. She subsequently made contact with him, and it led to Dell inviting Lee to perform at Royal Festival Hall on two occasions. As part of BBC Radio 2's South Bank Pops series, she was featured in the 'Dance Band Days' segment of the 1976 International Festival of Light Music. Roy Fox was in the audience, and the pair became friends again. He died in March 1982, and that June, she appeared in a 1982 edition of the programme, in which Dell paid tribute to Fox. Again appearing in a 'Dance Band Days' section of the show, she and Denny Dennis reprised their 1937 duet of "Let's Call the Whole Thing Off", and Lee sang "Nice Work If You Can Get It".

Lee and her husband Jack Milroy were honoured with a dinner by the Scottish branch of the Variety Club of Great Britain in the 1980s. In 1991, she appeared as Old Woman in the Rab C. Nesbitt television series. From 1991 to 1994, Lee presented a programme on Radio Clyde, which she later described as a "homely show geared to the Golden Oldies", adding that it gave her "the chance to play all the big band stuff which was enjoyed by young and old alike." She won a Sony Award for the show in 1991.

In 2012, Lee was featured on Len Goodman's Dancing Feet: The British Ballroom Story, a BBC Four documentary hosted by Strictly Come Dancing judge Len Goodman about Britain's golden age of ballroom dancing, in which she was interviewed about her time as a dance band singer. She recalled her three years with Fox's band, commenting, "It was really brilliant. And these boys knew what they were doing. You went on and you knew you were working for the best musicians in the world. And you couldn't else but be good. It was a happy, happy time."

== Personal life and death ==
Lee married Ronald Jackley Hirsch, known professionally as Ron Jackley, in 1942; he was the brother of the comedian Nat Jackley. The couple performed together on stage, and they had a daughter, Diana, in 1946, but the marriage did not last. Lee subsequently married Jack Milroy in Aberdeen in 1952, and they had a son, Jim. Milroy became half of the famous Scottish double act Francie and Josie, in which Milroy played Francie and Rikki Fulton was Josie. Lee and Milroy also performed together, having formed a comedy and musical double act. In 1992 and 1993, they sang a duet on Scottish Television's Hogmanay shows. Their marriage lasted for over forty years, only ending with Milroy's death on 1 February 2001.

Following this, Lee's memoirs, Forever Francie: My Life with Jack Milroy, were published in 2005. The couple's son, Jim, died from heart complications at the age of 60 in December 2014. He was a drummer at the Pavilion Theatre in Glasgow, and in 2015, Lee donated her late husband's Francie and Josie red suit to the theatre, commenting, "The suit will be a nice lasting memory to both Jack and Jim because this really was their favourite venue." Lee's grandson, Darrell Currie, is a well-known sports journalist and television presenter.

She was an Honorary Member and Honorary Vice-President of the Scottish Music Hall Society. In August 2021, Lee turned 100. She died at her home in Glasgow on 13 March 2022.

== See also ==
- British dance band
- Music hall
- Variety show
