= Glen Michael =

British television presenter and entertainer (1926–2025)

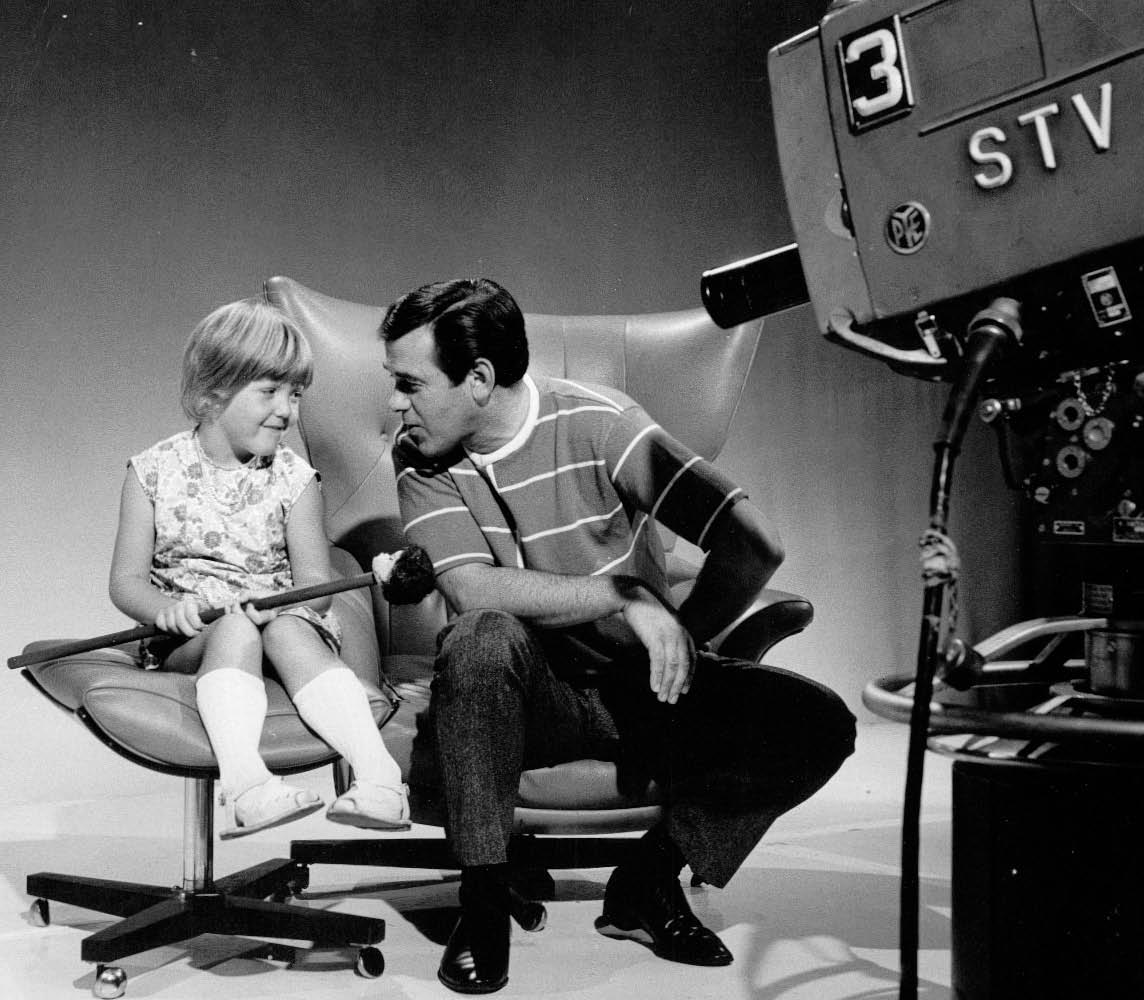
- The set of Glen Michael's Cartoon Cavalcade in 1967
- Born: Cecil Edward Buckland; 16 May 1926; Devon, England
- Died: 9 July 2025 (aged 99); Maidens, Scotland
- Occupation: Presenter; entertainer
- Known for: Glen Michael's Cartoon Cavalcade
- Spouse: Beryl Ratcliffe (m. 1947; died 2015)

Cecil Edward Buckland (16 May 1926 – 9 July 2025), known professionally as Glen Michael, was a British children's television presenter and entertainer. He hosted the popular children's television show Glen Michael's Cartoon Cavalcade, which ran for 26 years on Scottish Television from 1966. He also acted on stage across Scotland supporting comic Jack Milroy as a feed, later working with Rikki Fulton too. He appeared in the three series of The Adventures of Francie and Josie and in other television shows. He was a radio presenter for several years between 1974 and 2009.

== Early life ==
Michael was born Cecil Edward Buckland on 16 May 1926 in Paignton, Devon. His father, Arthur, was then a car salesman but always restless and the family moved to Lyme Regis where they ran a boarding house. He had a happy childhood there but then the family had a series of misfortunes. His elder brother died of measles and his father broke his leg. The boarding house failed and so his parents started a new career in service as a butler and cook. They started working for the chairman of a cheese company and were successful initially but his father fell out with the nanny and they moved on. They worked for a succession of other illustrious households including Highclere Castle but his father's volatility made their life unstable and so Michael got a chaotic education.

He left home in his late teens to pursue work as an entertainer. He joined Entertainments National Service Association (ENSA) and worked entertaining troops in many shows with roles that encompassed his talent for comedy, in particular, impersonations. His stage name, Glen Michael, was arrived at in stages. He first became known as Glenn Buckland when the MC for his first ENSA appearance forgot his first name and substituted the name of the band leader Glenn Miller. Later, in the 1950s, William Henshall, who produced revues in which his wife appeared, thought that Buckland was too long and suggested Michaels instead. Some inadvertent contractions then resulted in Glen Michael which was the form of the name which stuck.

== Stage career ==
In November 1952 he travelled to Scotland for five weeks' work at the Victoria theatre in Paisley with comedian Jack Milroy. He supported Milroy in several seasons of the Popplewell's Gaiety Whirl shows at the Gaiety Theatre, Ayr. In 1963 and 1964, Michael was in the Half Past Seven Show at the King's Theatre, Glasgow, supporting Milroy and Fulton with their Francie and Josie comedy act. By the end of 1964 he had appeared in most of the Howard and Wyndham's Half Past Seven and Five Past Eight shows in Glasgow and Edinburgh. In one show, Michael played ten different characters. In 1965 he was on stage at the Pavilion Theatre in Carry on Cranky as a villainous banker with Milroy playing the lead role. Glen had enjoyed success in theatre but had not felt ready to headline a show on stage himself; then, in 1966, Milroy left to pursue work in England.

In 1968, now a couple of years into presenting the Cartoon Cavalcade television show, he was aware how his image projected there was at odds with the stage roles he took where he was often cast as the villain. Later that year he appeared at a fundraising event at the Alhambra theatre in Glasgow which STV filmed to air on television the following month. In 1971, he appeared in High Living in Majorca, the stage adaption of High Living, the first British soap opera to be produced in Scotland.

== Television and film ==
Michael made an uncredited appearance in the Ealing Studios police drama The Blue Lamp in 1950; his character "Larry" and his date witnessed the shooting of Jack Warner (Dixon of Dock Green) as they entered a cinema.

After much work on stage, Michael eventually became involved with television work, starring in many Scottish Television productions and dramas. After signing an exclusive one-year contract with STV he was involved in the Would You Believe It?, a children's programme with a focus on interesting aspects of the natural world which was broadcast across the network, with the first episode airing in July 1968. He appeared in documentary programmes including Living With Computers, a report on computers in the mid 1960s, Past and Present (1969), and from the schools programme Think Clearly (1969) and Look and see No 8 (early 70s).

Michael was in all three series of The Adventures of Francie and Josie which were recorded in Glasgow at the Theatre Royal with a live audience and aired 1962–1965. Michael played many parts, including Josie's cousin when Jack Milroy was ill. When Rikki Fulton got a slot on STV on Sunday evenings The Rikki Fulton Hour, Michael was involved. He appeared in the Jimmy Logan Theatre Hour televised play Friends and Neighbours which screened in two parts on STV on Sunday evenings in November 1965. He was in Rikki Fulton's Grand Tour which aired on STV in January 1967. In 1967–1968 he had a main part in Over to Una, a comedy show with Una McLean. He also worked in a role as compere for Search for Beauty, a beauty pageant show that STV was involved with. He had some minor involvement in the BBC comedies The Revenue Men and The World of Wooster. He appeared on the STV's The One O'clock gang.

== Glen Michael's Cartoon Cavalcade ==
Michael achieved his best-known success with Glen Michael's Cartoon Cavalcade, which aired on Scottish Television for the first time on Wednesday 6 April 1966 as Cartoon Cavalcade. However Glen never started to present the series until 31 August 1966. The original host was Murdoch McPherson before Morag Forsyth took over from Wednesday 20 July 1966. Neither presenter made an impression with director of programmes Francis Essex, So the show's writer Jimmy McNair, got Michael audition for the series. Michael had to read a story but in his own words had “botched it” but Essex who watched Michael's audition was more impressed about the way Michael attacked the camera by smiling his way thought it, and offered Michael the show, initially on a trial basis for five weeks Michael's name was later added to the show title as the company realised that his contributions were appreciated by audiences.

The show is remembered by viewers in Central Scotland as their first exposure to many famous cartoons and for Michael's companions, Paladin the talking lamp, Totty the Robot and dogs Rudi and Rusti. Children's birthday greetings sent in by viewers was a regular popular feature, with Michael's production team also sending birthday cards to those who could not have their greetings read on air.

Although broadcast in the STV region, Cavalcade also aired periodically in the neighbouring Grampian Television region during the 1970s and 1980s. In its early years, the show was also carried by Southern Television and Westward Television

Originally airing at around 5pm on weekdays, the show moved to a 25 minute Sunday afternoon slot in July 1967. then back to Friday in September. It moved to Saturday timeslot in 1972, before moving again to Sunday afternoons in January 1974. Attracting viewing figures of over one million, Cavalcade won "best ITV programme in Scotland" at the annual awards presented in 1976 by the Radio Industries Club of Scotland. By 1984 there were more than 120 people involved in making the programme which was using Chroma key technology to superimpose Michael over scenes. The programme returned to a Saturday morning slot in September 1985, only to return to its Sunday timeslot the following April. From January 1989, Cavalcade moved to an earlier half-hour slot at 10.45am on Sunday mornings.

After over 26 years on air, Glen Michael's Cartoon Cavalcade was axed in December 1992. Michael recounted that at a small leaving event held for him, STV controller Gus Macdonald estimated that he had played to more than two billion viewers across the duration that the show had aired. STV then tried different approaches to their children's television programming. Wemyss Bay 902101 launched in 1993 and lasted for 15 months before being cancelled and replaced by Skoosh.

A few months after its final broadcast, a special one-off edition was released on VHS, featuring a selection of cartoons from the Paramount library.

== Radio ==
Michael was one of the first presenters on Radio Clyde which launched as Scotland's first commercial radio station in 1974. He had a slot on Thursday nights, playing music up until midnight. He presented for six and a half years. Michael later presented a weekly show on Saga FM every Sunday from 2004 until 2007, playing songs from stage shows and classic records.

== After Cavalcade ==
With the end of "Cavalcade", Michael continued working, taking a touring version of the show around Scotland to primary schools, assisted by his wife Beryl. He appeared playing a ventriloquist in an episode of the long-running crime drama Taggart that aired in 1995. Michael made a brief cameo in an episode of the BBC series VideoGaiden, playing himself in a speaking role. In the episode, Michael receives a coconut and some flowers in the mail (in an attempt to recreate the Nintendo game Animal Crossing) and sends a thankful letter in response.

In 2008 Michael released an autobiography called Life's a Cavalcade, in which he tells how he worked his way to becoming a performer, his life in the army and how he ended up in Scotland. Comic book writer Mark Millar cited that Cartoon Cavalcade inspired him to become a writer and none of his comic books would exist if it wasn't for Michael and his show. He invited Michael to the premiere of the film adaptation of his work Wanted. Millar helped Michael to get a cameo role in the film version of the Kick-Ass comic-book series. The footage with Michael, however, was cut from the final edit. Michael said, "I never expected to be in it at all. I think it was meant as a gesture. I think they were trying to make me feel like a real star. I had a trailer which was as big as a coach."

== Personal life and death ==
Michael married Beryl Ratcliffe in April 1947 and she died in 2015 aged 93. Six years after Beryl's death, he backed a campaign by Age Scotland to tackle loneliness and championed Erskine Veterans Charity as an ambassador. Michael died at his home after a short illness, in Maidens, Ayrshire on 9 July 2025, at the age of 99.
