= Scotch and Wry =

Scottish television comedy sketch show

- Directed by: Gordon Menzies (1978–1989); Brian Jobson (1989–1990); Ron Bain (1990–1992)
- Starring: Rikki Fulton; Gregor Fisher; Tony Roper; Claire Nielson; Juliet Cadzow; John Bett; Barbara Dickson
- Theme music composer: Reg Tilsley
- Country of origin: Scotland
- Original language: Scots
- No. of episodes: 23 (2 series & 12 specials)

Production
- Executive producer: Gordon Menzies (1990–1992)
- Producers: Gordon Menzies (1978–1989); Philip Differ (1990–1991); Tony Roper (1992)
- Production locations: BBC Broadcasting House, Glasgow, Scotland, UK
- Camera setup: Multi-camera
- Production company: BBC Scotland

Original release
- Network: BBC One Scotland
- Release: 30 September 1978 – 31 December 1992

Scotch and Wry is a Scottish television comedy sketch show produced by BBC Scotland and starring Rikki Fulton and a revolving ensemble cast which over the years included Gregor Fisher, Tony Roper, Claire Nielson, Juliet Cadzow and John Bett.

Initially running for two series from 1978 to 1979, the show went on to become a top-rating annual Hogmanay special for over a decade. The series also gave early exposure to emerging Scottish actors such as Gerard Kelly and Miriam Margolyes. In later years, cast members from sister BBC Scotland comedy show Naked Video would also make sporadic appearances.

== History ==
Scotch and Wry was developed from The Scotched Earth Show, a one-off special based on Scottish humorous writing, broadcast on New Year's Day 1977. Fulton starred in the special, having made sporadic television appearances since his ill-fated Rikki series for STV, which ended mid-run in 1967.

Scotch and Wry first aired on BBC1 Scotland at 10.30pm on Saturday 30 September 1978. Its comedic focus was on predominantly Scots and in particular Glaswegian humour, although the series also included material from London-based writers, including rejected scripts for The Two Ronnies. The show's signature tune throughout its entire run was a library track, Sexy Sox, composed by Reg Tilsley.

Overall, the viewer had to be familiar with both Scots and Glaswegian culture in order to understand many of the jokes. Much of the humour was constructed around distinctly Glaswegian themes; such as the city's suburbs, its football clubs, and even its famous sectarian divide was also played for laughs. The programmes (and some personalities) of rival ITV station STV (most notably Late Call) were frequently parodied on the show. In the later Hogmanay specials, a greater emphasis was placed on major news events that had happened during the previous year as their basis.

Another regular target in many sketches was Lanarkshire singer Sydney Devine, who later became one of the show's many guest stars, appearing in a parody of Phantom of the Opera. In the first years of the Hogmanay specials, singer Barbara Dickson performed musical interludes. It also became customary of Scotch and Wry to include a post-closing credits sketch, which was often a dig at The Hogmanay Show which followed immediately afterwards. The best remembered skit – from the 1985 special – involved Fulton interrupting a party to throw his television out of the window just before the show started.

For several years, Scotch and Wry also aired on BBC1 Northern Ireland but was given only one full networked airing by the BBC – the 1982 Hogmanay special aired outside Scotland on New Year's Day 1983. The last new episode – produced by regular cast member Tony Roper – aired on Thursday 31 December 1992.

Comedy specials have continued to air each Hogmanay on BBC1 Scotland, including Chewin' the Fat, Still Game and Only an Excuse?. Fulton also revived his Reverend I.M. Jolly character for several Hogmanay spin-off specials during the 1990s – Tis' the Season to the Jolly (1993), A Man for All Seasons (1994), Jolly: A Life (1995) and It's A Jolly Life (1999), which marked the character's farewell appearance. A specially recorded compilation, introduced by Fulton, aired in 1996 to mark the 50th anniversary of his showbusiness career.

== Characters ==
- Last Call: the programme's signature sketch was a parody of Scottish Television's nightly epilogue Late Call (its name being a play on the bar term “last call”). Each episode ended with a monologue delivered by a series of fictional ministers – each with a pun name and played by Fulton. The 'epilogues' were at first deemed controversial and blasphemous by the Church of Scotland. Fulton defended the sketches, stating Last Call was parodying the STV epilogues rather than the Kirk itself. The sketches opened and closed with an excerpt of the second movement from Tchaikovsky's Symphony No. 5. Among the ministers who delivered Last Call sermonettes:
  - Reverend I.M. Jolly, an ironically named and perpetually depressed minister who delivered the majority of the Last Call epilogues. The Jolly monologues usually contained references to his mysterious wife "Ephesia", and the antics of church organist "Mr. Bampot" – neither of which are seen (but are referred to) in the spin-off specials. After featuring in both series, Jolly went on to feature in every Hogmanay special and a number of spin-off specials during the 1990s.
  - Reverend David Goodchild: in a variant of a popular American vaudeville sketch from Red Skelton's repertoire, Goodchild's water decanter is accidentally spiked with gin by a floor manager, and as a result, he slowly gets more and more drunk as his monologue progresses. This sketch is regarded as one of the most memorable and popular in the show, and can also be regarded as one of Fulton's finest comic performances.
  - Reverend W.E Free, a hypocritical Free Presbyterian minister who uses his epilogue to go into an angry diatribe about the "sins" of his parishioners—only to reveal he envied their ability to partake in such sins.
  - Mrs Ida Closeshave, a woman who talked about the events surrounding her missionary work.
  - Father Kevin Dulally, a Roman Catholic priest who must hold his bladder through the entire epilogue, due to not being able to use the bathroom before recording.
  - The Very Rev. A. King Bones, an elderly and befuddled minister with thick eyeglasses, who misses his cues and ends up overrunning his timeslot.
  - Rev. Justin Thyme, a retiring minister who recounted his contentious departure from his congregation in a series of hymn titles.
- Andrew (Andy) Ross the Supercop, an incompetent traffic policeman with the catchphrase OK, Stirling, oot the car!, only to find himself dealing with Batman, an extraterrestrial, DCI Jim Taggart, Dr Crippen or any other unlikely traffic offender (including, in one sketch, the Reverend I.M. Jolly).
- Dirty Dickie Dandruff, an extremely unhygienic television chef billed as the Gallowgate Gourmet, based at "Dick's Delicatmessen".
- Aloycious {AKA Tam} McGlinchey, a colourful Rab C Nesbitt-esque character.
- Alky Broon, similar to the Dickie Dandruff character, who first appeared in 1983 as a terminally unhygienic barber, and later, as a cack-handed dentist.
- Are Ye Dancin?, a spoof of dancing shows featuring hosts Francie (Fulton) and Josie (Jack Milroy); a revival of a double act Fulton and Milroy had done since the 1960s.
- Ticket Clerk, an unsympathetic ticket clerk, intended to poke fun at British Rail. He regularly would pull the shutter down in front of an unfortunate passenger with the line the last train left five minutes ago.

=== Notable one-offs ===
- Rangers F.C. were regularly parodied (as were its Old Firm rival, Celtic F.C.). The best known football sketch from the series saw the Rangers manager (Fulton) being convinced by a new scout (Fisher) to sign a stand-out player (Gerard Kelly), only to discover, immediately after having signed the contract, that the young prospect is a Roman Catholic. The humour from the sketch derives from the sectarian rivalry between the traditionally Protestant Rangers and traditionally Catholic Celtic, Rangers' unwritten club rule in effect at the time barring the signing of Catholic players, and the manager's failed attempts to, as subtly as possible, find an excuse to get out of the contract and prevent him from playing.
- Big Chief Swift Half, an unemployed Glaswegian who dresses up as an American Indian to get out of getting a job.
- Michael Jackson from Jordanhill, Fulton again plays an unemployed Glaswegian trying to be hired by a nightclub manager, but dressed in a bizarre disguise as Michael Jackson (parodying Jackson's famous costume from the album Bad). When the ruse fails, he tries again, this time as "Shirley Bassey from Bearsden".
- S.W Duff, a funeral director.

Key one-off parodies included Bonnie Prince Charlie, Robert the Bruce, The Beechgrove Garden, The Curries (a send up of The Corries) and Box 2001 1/2 (a parody of STV's community broadcasting slot Box 2000). Feature guest stars from the series of Hogmanay specials included Barry McGuigan, Jim Watt, Mark McManus, Gavin Hastings, and BBC Scotland sports pundits Dougie Donnelly and Archie Macpherson.

== Repeats and releases ==
Several compilation programmes have been broadcast, including a Hogmanay special in 1996 – marking Fulton's 50-year anniversary in show business – and a six-part series, The Very Best of Scotch and Wry, aired in 2004 following the death of Rikki Fulton. The original series was also aired on UK Gold from 1994 to 1995.

Scotch and Wry first became available on VHS with four special compilations released by BBC Video during the mid to late 1980s and early 1990s. The first was Scotch & Wry, which was released in 1986, and proved such a massive hit that a second compilation, Double Scotch & Wry, followed in 1987, proving almost as popular. Each video was 90 minutes in length and featured sketches right up to the 1985 and 1986 specials respectively. A third video, Triple Scotch & Wry, was released in 1990 and finally a fourth video, Scotch & Wry 4: Prince of Pochlers, in 1992. For copyright reasons, none of the DVD releases feature the Barbara Dickson musical interludes which formed part of the early Hogmanay specials, and musical soundtracks (such as the Dirty Dick's Delicatmessen skits – which originally featured Something's Cooking in the Kitchen by Dana) have been edited out.

All four compilations were subsequently re-released on DVD in 2006, and again as part of The Ultimate Rikki Fulton Collection DVD box set in 2007. However, a full release of the first two full series and all 12 subsequent Hogmanay specials remains unlikely.
