= Rangers F.C. policy of not signing Catholics =

Rangers Football Club's former signing policy

Between the First World War and the late 1980s, the Scottish football club Rangers had an unwritten policy not to sign any player who was a Catholic, or employ Catholics in other roles. Since the early 20th century, Rangers have been viewed as a Protestant, Unionist, anti-Catholic club, in contrast to their Old Firm rivals, Celtic, who have been seen as an Irish Catholic club, although Celtic never had a similar policy. Rangers' policy was ended in 1989 when they signed former Celtic striker Mo Johnston, under manager Graeme Souness.

== History ==
=== Origins ===
Prior to the First World War, Rangers did not have any policy regarding players' religion, and at that time the club did have a number of Catholic players. In 1912, Belfast-based shipbuilding company Harland & Wolff acquired the Govan Old, Middleton and Govan New shipyards in Glasgow, and this created employment opportunities for large numbers of workers from the Belfast shipyards. This workforce was overwhelmingly Protestant and Unionist, and many of them gave their support to Rangers, who had an existing, albeit solely competitive, rivalry with Celtic. Celtic were at the time Scotland's most successful team, with Rangers comfortably second in terms of overall trophies won but posing the greatest and most sustained challenge to Celtic's dominance of Scottish football. The influx of largely loyalist workers to Glasgow also helped precipitate an increase in popularity of the Orange Order in the city and surrounding areas. Rangers players and directors attended some functions in Orange lodges, and subsequently, with the connections between Rangers and loyalism and Orangeism rapidly strengthening, the club quietly introduced an unwritten rule that they would not sign any player or employ any staff member who was openly Catholic. An indication that the policy was specifically anti-Catholic rather than Protestant-only was Rangers' signing of Egyptian international Mohamed Latif in 1934.

=== Media attention (1960s-1980s) ===
The policy was mostly ignored by the press until the 1960s. In 1965 Ralph Brand, on leaving the club for Manchester City, told the News of the World that Rangers operated a Protestants-only policy. In 1967 vice-chairman Matt Taylor was asked about perceived anti-Catholicism with the ban on Catholics at Rangers; he stated "[it is] part of our tradition ... we were formed in 1873 as a Protestant boys club. To change now would lose us considerable support".

In 1969, following violence by Rangers fans in Newcastle, some in the media started to criticise the club for its anti-Catholic policy. In 1976, a friendly at Aston Villa was abandoned because of hooliganism by Rangers fans. This included fans attacking a pub that had been bombed by the IRA two years prior, which drew particular criticism from the Orange Order. The Orange Order stated "Let us be perfectly blunt. The same examples of low animal life who force their support on Glasgow Rangers are one and the same with the foul-mouthed drunks who cause us great embarrassment every July when they turn up to 'support' our annual rallies". In response, the Rangers manager Willie Waddell declared an intent to change the media perception of Rangers being a sectarian club. While he denied the existence of the signing policy, he stated that "no religious barriers will be put up at this club regarding signing of players" and pledged to remove supporters from Ibrox Park who did not accept it. Despite this assertion, no senior Catholic players were signed by Rangers following it; these statements were understood by the media and the fans to be untrue, and a response to Rangers' fears of investigation by FIFA.

The policy extended to non-Catholic players and others who married Catholics. In 1973 David Hope, a Rangers director, was denied the chairmanship because he had married a Catholic 43 years earlier. In 1980 Graham Fyfe said that he had to leave Rangers because he had married a Catholic woman. Former Rangers player and Manchester United manager Alex Ferguson wrote that although Rangers' management knew of his decision to marry a Catholic, he experienced "poisonous hostility" from the club's PR officer Willie Allison.

Despite the policy, some Catholic players did play for Rangers during this time. South African Don Kitchenbrand kept his Catholicism secret and Laurie Blyth left the club after his Catholic faith was discovered. Promising youth player John Spencer did join the club in 1982 and quietly progressed through the ranks, while having to deal with hostility from fans of both Rangers and Celtic as a result.

Northern Irish club Linfield, which shares a similar culture to Rangers, had a policy of only employing Protestants until the mid-1990s. By contrast, Celtic never had a similar policy banning players of any religion. Jock Stein, Celtic's first Protestant manager, once stated that if he was offered a Catholic player and a Protestant player, he would sign the Protestant. When asked why he said: "Because I know Rangers would never sign the Catholic".

=== Maurice Johnston signing (1989) ===
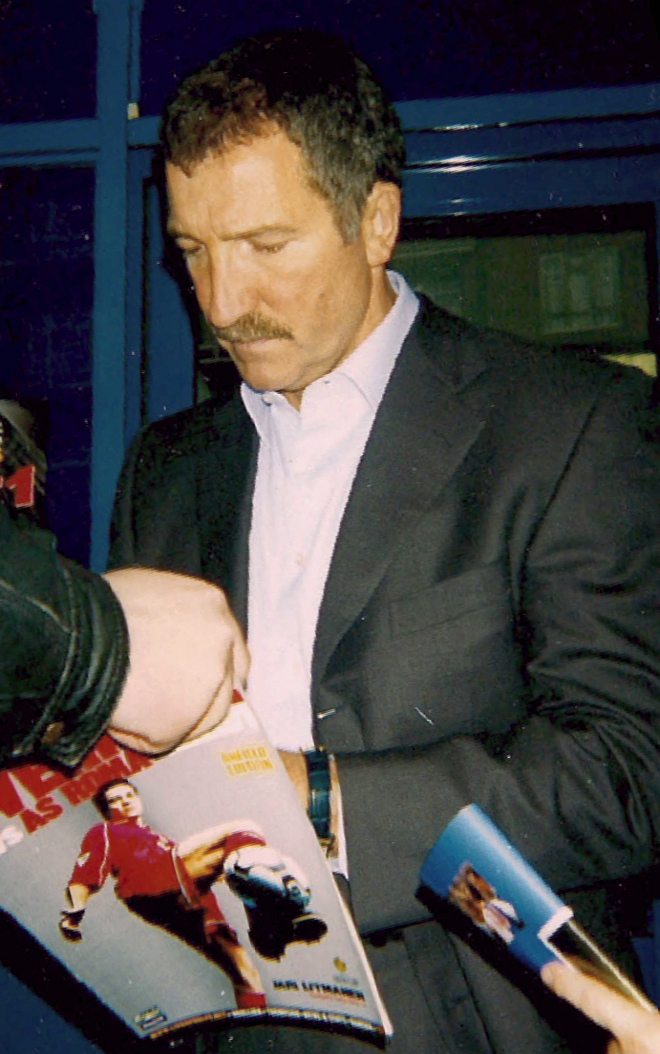
As manager of Rangers, Graeme Souness (pictured in 2001) signed Maurice Johnston, an openly Catholic player.

Graeme Souness became Rangers manager in May 1986 and declared his intent to build a team based only on merit, saying that signing players who observed another religion or had a different skin colour (Note: Souness signed Mark Walters, the first black player to play for Rangers in over 50 years, in December 1987.) "felt completely normal". In the summer of 1989, Rangers signed Mo Johnston, a former Celtic player and openly Catholic. Johnston had recently agreed to return to Celtic from Nantes, but the deal had not been completed, and signing such a prominent ex-Celtic player was an especially big coup for their rivals. This was Rangers' first signing of an openly Catholic player since the policy was introduced. There were claims in the media that it was done to counter a FIFA inquiry into sectarianism. Johnston's agent Bill McMurdo felt that Rangers would need a "very special person" to cope with the pressure of being the first player to break the policy. Before signing Johnston, Souness had also approached other Catholic players, including John Collins, Ian Rush and Ray Houghton.

Following the signing of Johnston, the general secretary of the Rangers Supporters Association, David Miller, stated "It is a sad day for Rangers. Why sign him above all others? There will be a lot of people handing in their season tickets. I don't want to see a Roman Catholic at Ibrox. It really sticks in my throat." Having received a leak that the transfer was about to happen, the Belfast Telegraph reported the deal before it was announced. This prompted a group of loyalists to gather outside the newspaper office demanding the story be retracted, while their telephone switchboard was jammed with angry callers. The Rangers kitman refused to lay out Johnston's kit before each match as a protest against a Catholic playing for Rangers. Some fans responded by burning their season tickets, although this view was not shared by all of the Rangers supporters. Some welcomed the fact that they had got one over their rivals, while the Johnston signing brought back some lapsed fans who had been troubled by religious discrimination. Rangers' attendances and season ticket sales continued to grow in the following years.

=== 1990s onwards ===
Following Mo Johnston, the club did not make another major Scottish Catholic signing until Neil McCann in 1998, although the end of limitations on the number of foreign players in that period led to far fewer Scottish players being signed in general. In that same year, Rangers lifted a ban on players making the sign of the cross at the behest of Gabriel Amato but warned them not to do it in front of supporters. Gennaro Gattuso, an Italian Catholic who played for Rangers in the 1997–98 season, alleged that his teammates ordered him to take off his crucifix necklace. In 1998, fellow Italian Lorenzo Amoruso became the first Catholic captain of Rangers, and Bob Brannan became the first club director who was a Catholic. In 2002, defender Fernando Ricksen said that Rangers' Catholic players had to hide their religion because of sectarianism at the club. He stated that he had been receiving sectarian phone calls, and "If you're Catholic and you play for Rangers, then you are a Protestant. If you play for the Protestant people, you don't play for the Catholic people."

In 2006, Rangers appointed their first Catholic manager, Paul Le Guen, and in 2013 signed Jon Daly, a high-profile Irish Catholic player.

== In popular culture ==
The policy was parodied in the BBC comedy Scotch and Wry in 1979, where the Rangers manager (played by Rikki Fulton) unwittingly agrees to sign a young Catholic player (Gerard Kelly), on the recommendation of a Rangers scout (Gregor Fisher). When the player says he had to leave a match early to attend Mass, the manager tries to find excuses for voiding the contract to avoid breaking the policy.

== See also ==
- Sectarianism in Glasgow
- Athletic Bilbao signing policy
- Yorkshire County Cricket Club
