= Ron Hamilton (musician) =

American musician (1950–2023)

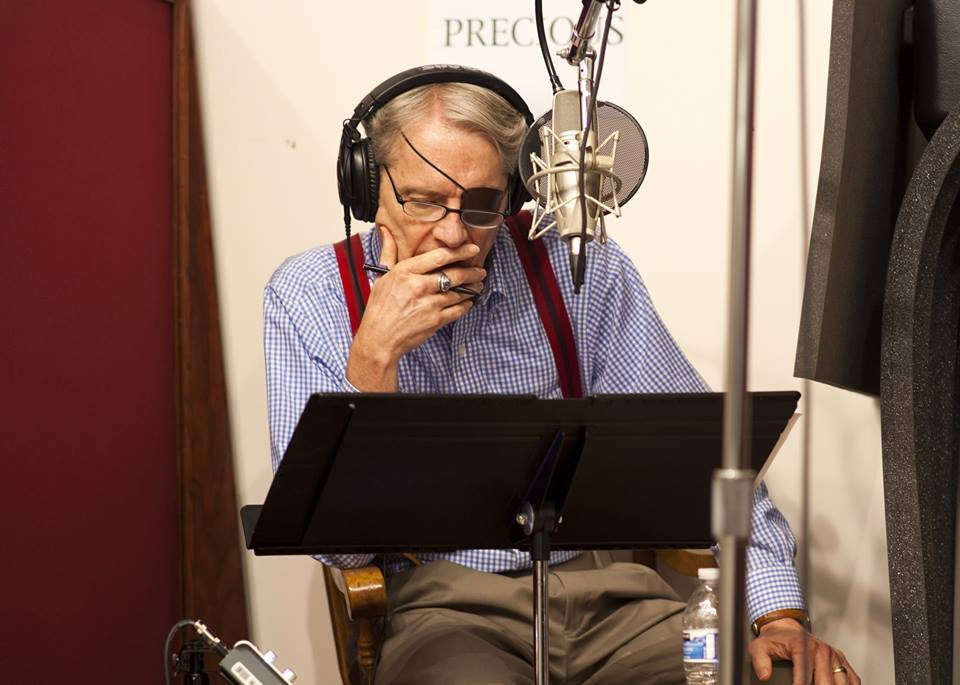
- Hamilton in 2014

Background information
- Born: Ronald Allen Hamilton; November 9, 1950; Indiana, U.S.
- Died: April 19, 2023 (aged 72)
- Occupations: Musician; composer; lyricist
- Instruments: Vocals; guitar; trombone; piano
- Years active: 1970–2018
- Label: Majesty Music
- Spouse: Shelly Garlock Hamilton

Ronald Allen Hamilton (November 9, 1950 – April 19, 2023), also known as "Patch the Pirate", was an American Christian musician, composer, preacher, and radio personality. He was president and owner of Majesty Music, a Christian music publisher, and the creator of the Patch the Pirate Adventure series. Hamilton became affectionately known as "Patch the Pirate" when he began wearing an eye patch after losing his left eye to cancer in 1978. He published hundreds of songs and hymns and wrote numerous cantatas, plays, and children's stories.

== Biography ==
Ron Hamilton was born in Indiana on November 9, 1950. His mother encouraged him to study music as a child, and he reluctantly learned to play the trombone, piano, and the guitar. As a young boy, his family would sing often together, and the children were encouraged to make up their own parts to harmonize.

Hamilton attended Bob Jones University where he received a BA in Church Music in 1973, and an MA in Church Music Composition. He married Shelly Garlock in 1975, and the couple began working at Majesty Music with his father-in-law, Dr. Frank Garlock, who was a well-known speaker in Independent Baptist circles. Ron and Shelly had five children: Jonathan, Tara, Alyssa, Megan, and Jason, who all performed as voice actors on the Patch the Pirate Adventures.

In 1978, a doctor discovered cancer in Hamilton's left eye that required his eye to be removed. As he traveled around speaking at evangelistic services in churches with Dr. Garlock, children began calling Hamilton "Patch the Pirate." Around this time, he began writing music for children to be sung in church, which Majesty Music later released as an album. In 1982, "Patch" decided to add a comedic drama script along with his children's music and called the album Patch the Pirate Goes to Space. The album was very successful and led to a new Patch the Pirate Adventure being released every year since 1982. The most recent release, A Whale of a Tale (2021), is the 42nd adventure. Patch the Pirate Adventures are broadcast on a number of radio stations internationally and are recognized by the National Religious Broadcasters as the third largest religious children's programming outreach; over two million copies have been sold.

Hamilton served as music pastor at Calvary Baptist Church in Simpsonville, South Carolina, for 21 years. Until 2018, he continued to travel as an evangelistic speaker and also served as the director of Majesty MusiColleges, which are seminars held across the United States for Christian music directors and musicians. Approximately one thousand musicians receive training at these MusiColleges each year. More recently, he and his wife had been living in Navarre, Florida. In May 2013, his first-born son, Jonathan, died from suicide after a lengthy battle with mental health issues. In 2017, Hamilton was diagnosed with early onset dementia. After the diagnosis, his son-in-law and daughter, Adam Morgan and Megan Morgan, assumed control of the family's flagship publishing company, Majesty Music. Hamilton continued traveling and performing for as long as he was able. In 2018, the Morgans took Hamilton's popular character to the big screen, releasing the first-ever Patch the Pirate animated movie based on his characters.

== Death ==
Hamilton was placed in hospice care on April 16, 2023, and died at home on April 19, 2023, at age 72.

== Songs ==
Popular songs written by Hamilton include Rejoice in the Lord, Bow the Knee, Wings as Eagles, It Is Finished, My Hope Is Jesus, David, Wiggle Worm, Beautiful Hands, Always the Same, "Here Am I, Lord", Born to Die, Little by Little, The Poochie Lip Disease, How Can I Fear, Lord, I Need You, Servant's Heart, Clean It Up, "I Am Weak, but You Are Strong", Christ Is Coming, Jonah, Call the Wambulance, That's Where Wisdom Begins, I Saw Jesus in You, A Secret Place, and Cherish the Moments. Hamilton has also authored a number of popular Christmas and Easter cantatas, including Born to Die, Klinkenschnell the Christmas Bell, Peanut Butter Christmas, and The Hope of Christmas.

== Discography ==
- Rejoice in the Lord (1978)
- Sing Along with Patch the Pirate (1981)
- Patch the Pirate Goes to Space (1982)
- Patch the Pirate Goes West (1983)
- Patch the Pirate Goes to the Jungle (1984)
- Kidnapped on I-Land (1985)
- The Great American Time Machine (1986)
- The Misterslippi River Race (1987)
- Wings as Eagles (1987)
- The Calliope Caper (1988)
- Camp Kookawacka Woods (1989)
- The Custards' Last Stand (1990)
- Patch Praises 1 (1990)
- Peanut Butter Christmas (1991)
- Christmas at Home (1991)
- The Friend Ship Mutiny (1991)
- Cherish the Moment (1991)
- Once Upon a Starry Knight (1992)
- Patch Praises 2 (1992)
- Down Under (1993)
- Harold the King (1993)
- The Evolution Revolution (1994)
- Mount Zion Marathon (1995)
- Giant Killer (1996)
- I Saw Jesus in You (1996)
- Polecat's Poison (1997)
- The Sneaky Sheik (1998)
- Patch Praises 3 (1998)
- Afraidika Fever (1999)
- The Lone Stranger (2000)
- Lord of All (2000)
- The Tumbleweed Opera (2001)
- Coldheartica (2002)
- Worship the Lord (2002)
- Limerick the Leprechaun (2003)
- Shipwrecked on Pleasure Island (2004)
- The Kashmir Kid (2005)
- The Villain of Venice (2006)
- Songs of Home & Heaven (2006)
- Only By His Grace (2006)
- The Colonel's Colossal Character Quest (2007)
- I Stand Redeemed (2007)
- Armadillo Amigos (2008)
- Kung Phooey Kid (2009)
- Shadow of the Cross (2009)
- The Legend of Stickyfoot (2010)
- We Are Your Church (2010)
- Incrediworld (2011)
- Kingdom Chronicles (2012)
- Patch Praises 4 (2012)
- Rock of Ages (2012)
- International Spy Academy (2013)
- Shout out for Joy (2013)
- Kilimanjaro (2014)
- Look Up (2014)
- Ocean Commotion (2015)
- Hymns Every Child Should Know (2015)
- Operation Arctic: Viking Invasion (2016)
- Shepherd of My Soul (2016)
- Time Twisters (2017)
- Stay the Course (2017)
- The Incredible Race (2018)
- God of Wonders (2018)
- The Final Voyage? (2019)
- Mystery Island (2020)
- A Whale of a Tale (2021)

== Feature films ==
- Operation Arctic: Viking Invasion (2018)

== Awards and honors ==
Hamilton held honorary doctorates from Bob Jones University and Pensacola Christian College.
