= Late Call =

Late Call may refer to:

- Late Call (TV programme), a Scottish short religious television programme
- Late Call (novel), a 1964 novel by Angus Wilson
  - Late Call (TV series), a 1975 miniseries based on the novel
