= Jack Milroy =

Scottish comedian (1915–2001)

- Born: James Cruden; 28 December 1915; Govanhill, Glasgow, Scotland
- Died: 1 February 2001 (aged 85); Glasgow, Scotland
- Spouse: Mary Lee (m. 1952)
- Children: 2

Jack Milroy, MBE (born James Cruden; 28 December 1915 – 1 February 2001), was a Scottish comedian. Born in Govanhill, Glasgow and educated at Shawlands Academy, Milroy is noted for his partnership with comedy actor Rikki Fulton as Francie and Josie. The pair appeared together as lovable Glasgow teddy boys on television, in theatres across Scotland and in pantomime, from 1960 until their final appearance at the King's Theatre in Glasgow in 1996.

Following service in the army during World War II, Milroy began a song-and-dance act which led him to meet his wife, Mary Lee, who was a singer. The couple married in Aberdeen in 1952. A natural comedian, Milroy appeared in Glasgow, which he continued to make his base, had his own show at the Tivoli Theatre, Aberdeen in the 1950s and was a regular favourite at the Gaiety Theatre, Ayr.

Milroy was awarded an MBE in 2000 for services to entertainment. He had a wife, as well as a son and step-daughter. He died on 1 February 2001, aged 85.
