= The Epilogue =

The Epilogue being transmitted from Broadcasting House in 1935

The Epilogue was a feature of radio and later television. Originally it was the last programme broadcast each Sunday evening lasting five to ten minutes. It was a non-denominational talk on a reflective theme usually delivered by a Christian minister or priest in a straight to-camera format. In British television terminology, an "epilogue" is an equivalent of the American sermonette. Later the format was adopted by the independent television broadcaster ITV and its franchises, including Scottish Television and Southern Television.

The Epilogue was first broadcast on BBC Radio on Sunday 26 September 1926. Originally the programme consisted of themed Bible readings but later hymns were added for listeners at home to join in with. At this time the BBC's Sunday radio broadcasts were restricted to programmes that were regarded as inoffensive and appropriate to the Sabbath, and in this area The Epilogue stood out and was greatly appreciated by its listeners. Two years later in 1928 the BBC could report that the Sunday Epilogue was "the most popular single item in all the programmes".

During the 1930s The Epilogue was transmitted from Studio 3E in Broadcasting House in London. However, during World War II the BBC moved much of its operations out of London to Bedford where the BBC Epilogue was transmitted live on the Home Service and Forces Programme at the end of each day's radio programmes at about 10.30pm. At first it was broadcast from St Paul's Church in Bedford but because of the problems caused by blacking-out the church windows the programme was later relocated to the Bunyan Chapel studio.

In 1955 ITV launched and many ITV regions aired their own versions of the programme. These included both London contractors, Southern Television and its successor TVS, Scottish Television (whose programme was called Late Call), Tyne Tees Television and TWW. The launch of 24-hour television on ITV in the late 1980s saw these programmes come to a natural end, although some did carry on for a short while after through-the-night broadcasting was launched, but all had ended by the early 1990s.
