= Adam Morgan (politician) =

American politician (born 1989)

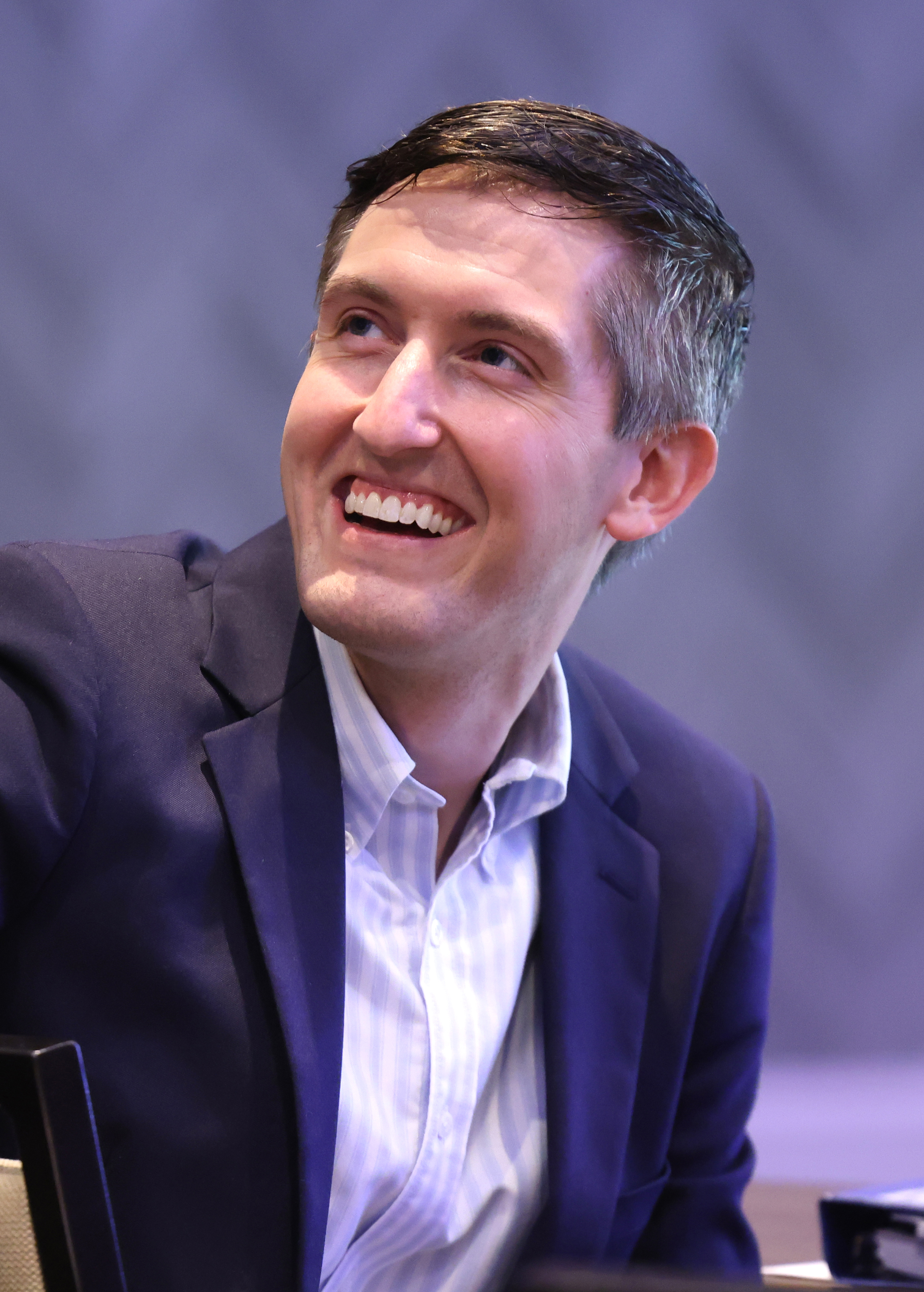

Member of the South Carolina House of Representatives from the 20th district
- In office November 12, 2018 – November 11, 2024
- Preceded by: Dan Hamilton
- Succeeded by: Stephen Frank

Personal details
- Born: April 26, 1989 (age 37) Dallas, Texas, U.S.
- Party: Republican
- Spouse: Megan Hamilton (m. 2016)
- Relations: Alan Morgan (brother)
- Children: 3
- Education: Bob Jones University (BA); University of South Carolina (JD)

Adam M. Morgan (born April 26, 1989) is an American politician, attorney, composer, radio personality, and president of Majesty Music.

Morgan is the brother of Alan Morgan, who also serves in the South Carolina State House from the 18th District.

== Early life ==
Morgan was born in Dallas, Texas, to Timothy and Michele Morgan. He graduated with a bachelor's degree from Bob Jones University in 2011, where he served as the student body president. He then graduated with a Juris Doctor (J.D.) from University of South Carolina School of Law in 2015, and became a member of the South Carolina Bar.

== Political career ==
Morgan was a member of the South Carolina House of Representatives from the 20th District, serving from November 2018 to November 2024. He represented the Eastside of Greenville, South Carolina in the Upstate of South Carolina. He is a member of the Republican Party.

In 2021 Morgan was elected as the Founding Chairman of the South Carolina Freedom Caucus He also served on the House Legislative Oversight and Education and Public Works Committees.

=== 2024 U.S. House election ===
In November 2023, Morgan announced his candidacy for South Carolina's 4th Congressional District, a seat held by William Timmons. Morgan was endorsed in the race by South Carolina's 5th Congressional District US House member Ralph Norman. Morgan lost the Republican primary to Timmons by a narrow margin, vacating his South Carolina House seat.

During the election a debate clip of Morgan went viral garnering millions of views on social media platforms thanks to Matt Gaetz, Charlie Kirk and others sharing it.

In it a Democratic Representative Todd Rutherford asked Morgan, “You’re suggesting we should listen to the people back home in your district rather than the people at [the] Commerce [Department]?” To which Morgan fired back, “I one hundred percent am going to listen to ‘the people back home’ whom I represent in this House! And you should listen to the 40,000 people in your area, and not the bureaucrats in Commerce, and not the lobbyists, and not the multi-billion dollar international corporations. You should listened to your constituents like I am.”

=== 2026 Gubernatorial election ===
On June 1, 2026 gubernatorial candidate Ralph Norman announced Morgan as his running mate for Lieutenant Governor of South Carolina.

== Entertainment career ==
Morgan is currently the president and co-owner of Majesty Music, a publishing company, recording studio, and music academy headquartered in Greenville, South Carolina. He has written numerous songs and children's books, and has written and produced the popular Patch the Pirate children's audio series since 2014.

In 2025 Morgan became a regular radio guest host on 94.5 WORD/WYRD talk radio in Upstate South Carolina.

=== Discography ===
Morgan has published more than 80 songs, including "Arise" (2015), "The One Who First Loved Me" (2015), "The Greatest Story Ever Told" (2016), "In God We Trust, In God Alone" (2016), "God of Wonders" (2017), "Only One" (2018), "Can It Be" (2019), "Justified" (2021), "At the Name of Jesus" (2021) “Always There” (2024), and “Bought with a Price” (2025). He also co-wrote several songs with his wife, Megan Morgan, and his father-in-law, Ron "Patch" Hamilton.

- Kilimanjaro (2014)
- Ocean Commotion (2015)
- Operation Arctic: Viking Invasion (2016)
- Shepherd of My Soul (2016)
- Time Twisters (2017)
- Stay the Course (2017)
- The Incredible Race (2018)
- God of Wonders (2018)
- The Final Voyage? (2019)
- Can It Be (2020)
- Mystery Island (2020)
- Justified (2021)
- Whale of a Tale (2021)
- Tale of Two Siblings (2022)
- Forgiven (2023)
- Passage to Paradise (2023)
- Danger in the Deep (2024)
- Switchersnatchers (2025)

=== Feature films ===
- Operation Arctic: Viking Invasion (2018)

== Personal life ==
In 2016, Morgan married Megan Hamilton, daughter of singer/songwriter Ron "Patch" Hamilton and Shelly Hamilton. The couple and their three children live in Taylors, South Carolina. Morgan is a member and deacon of Morningside Baptist Church.
