= Majesty Music =

Coordinates: 34.869878°N 82.377269°W

Majesty Music, Inc.
- Type: Private
- Industry: Retailing, publishing
- Founded: Greenville, South Carolina, 1973
- Headquarters: Greenville, South Carolina
- Products: Sheet music, books, hymnals, recorded music, Patch the Pirate materials
- Website: www.majestymusic.com

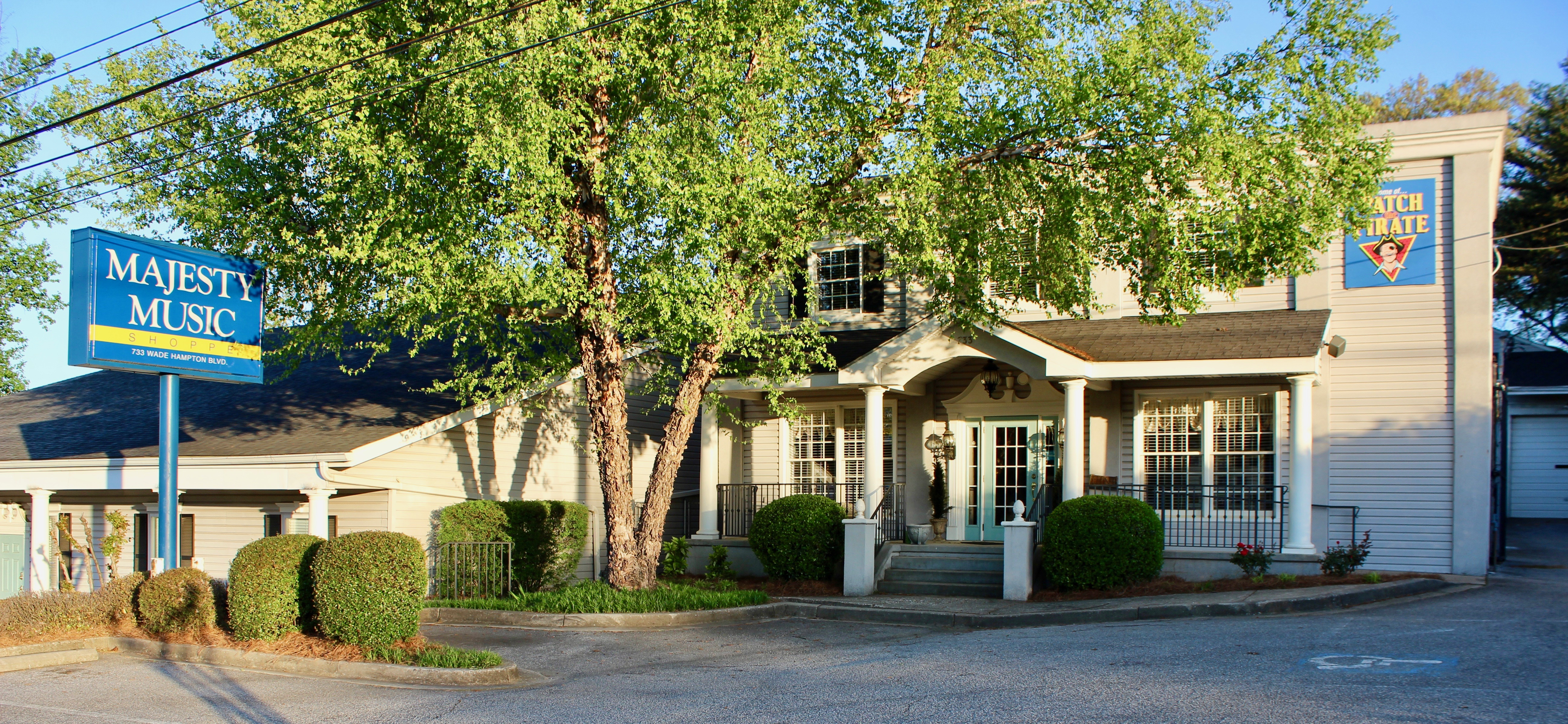
Majesty Music, Greenville, South Carolina.

Majesty Music is a privately owned, conservative evangelical Christian music and book publishing company in Greenville, South Carolina, perhaps best known for its children's adventure-story character Patch the Pirate. The company publishes sheet music, hymnals, choral collections, cantatas and Christmas plays, audio recordings, and feature-length cartoons.

== History ==
Majesty Music (originally Musical Ministries) was founded in 1973 by Frank Garlock (1930–2023), a musician with academic training from both Bob Jones University (BJU) and the Eastman School of Music. While teaching music theory at BJU, Garlock began a second career of "challenging the rock culture," denouncing contemporary music for promoting "rebellion" and "the violation of moral principles." Garlock feared that contemporary music styles were permeating evangelical churches as well as the larger society. Leaving the BJU faculty, he continued to conduct choral seminars to emphasize alternatives to contemporary music and (with the help of a wealthy friend) published, through his company, religious music written by himself, his daughter Shelly, and her husband Ron Hamilton (1950–2023).

After losing an eye to cancer, Hamilton created the character "Patch the Pirate," around which he based an album of children's songs, Sing Along with Patch the Pirate (1981). By 2018, Majesty Music had released 39 Patch the Pirate albums, sold more than a million recordings, and produced more than 800 of Hamilton's songs. In 1984, Majesty Music created Patch the Pirate clubs and published material for them that included Bible studies, devotional material, and elementary music theory lessons. Within ten years, more than 10,000 children were enrolled in the program. Majesty Music also supported an Adventures of Patch the Pirate radio broadcast, recognized by the National Religious Broadcasters as the country's third largest religious program for children, airing on more than 450 stations.

Besides the Patch the Pirate material, Majesty Music has sold its own hymnals, sheet music, cantatas, and vocal and instrumental CDs and DVDs, some of them in Spanish. The company also continued to hold two-day music conferences. At first operating from Frank Garlock's garage, Majesty Music expanded several times and eventually occupied two adjacent buildings on Wade Hampton Boulevard within walking distance of Bob Jones University. In 2018, the company repurposed its underused recording facility to accommodate a music studio, Majesty Music Academy. During the late 1990s, the Garlocks began transferring ownership of the business to the Hamiltons; and in the 2010s, the Hamiltons made similar arrangements to perpetuate the ministry through their daughter, Megan, and her husband, Adam Morgan.
