= Patch the Pirate =

Christian children's music artist

Ron Hamilton "Patch the Pirate"

Patch the Pirate is an Evangelical Christian series of character-building, comical, and musical recordings for children produced by Majesty Music. The eponymous title character, Patch the Pirate, was played by Ron "Patch" Hamilton, who was a Christian singer, songwriter, composer, evangelist, and personality. Hamilton has created and published 40 Patch the Pirate Adventures including the first release Sing Along with Patch the Pirate in 1981, and the latest release in 2019 "The Final Voyage?". Over 2 million Patch the Pirate adventures have been sold since the release of the first album. The Patch the Pirate Radio Program is recognized by the National Religious Broadcasters as the third largest religious children's programming outreach.

== History ==
In 1978, doctors discovered cancer in Hamilton's left eye resulting in the loss of the eye. After recovering from the surgery, he received an eye patch from the surgeon. Wherever Hamilton went wearing the patch, children would point at him and call him a pirate. Hamilton decided that he would either correct children the rest of his life or embrace the fact that he was now a pirate. Before he lost his eye to cancer, Hamilton and his wife, Shelly, worked at Musical Ministries, later called Majesty Music, writing and performing sacred music in churches across the United States. After losing his eye, "Patch," as he became known, released an album of children's music. This album was wildly popular and led to the creation of Patch the Pirate, which included music and original stories. Ron Hamilton wrote the stories and most of the songs, and his wife, Shelly, arranged the songs. The couple and their five children, Jonathan, Tara, Alyssa, Megan, and Jason, also starred on the recordings as members of Patch's crew.

After losing his eye, Hamilton wrote a song entitled Rejoice in the Lord, which became one of his most widely popular songs. Other famous songs written by Hamilton include Wings as Eagles, My Hope Is Jesus, Wiggle Worm, Bow the Knee, Beautiful Hands, Always the Same, Here Am I, Lord, Born to Die, Little by Little, The Poochie Lip Disease, How Can I Fear, Lord, I Need You, Servant's Heart, Clean It Up, I Am Weak, but You Are Strong, Christ Is Coming, Jonah, Call the Wambulance, That's Where Wisdom Begins, I Saw Jesus in You, A Secret Place, Cherish the Moments, and "The Incredible Race!". Hamilton has also authored a number of popular Christmas and Easter cantatas including Born to Die, Klinkenschnell the Christmas Bell, Peanut Butter Christmas, The Hope of Christmas.

== Majesty Music ==
Patch the Pirate Adventures are produced and published by Majesty Music and are sold on iTunes, Amazon, Google Play, and Spotify. Majesty Music was founded by Dr. Frank Garlock in 1973.

Patch the Pirate event

Dr. Garlock, and his new son-in-law Ron, travelled to churches across the world speaking about music, and founded Majesty Music, Inc. to produce quality sacred music for churches. Majesty Music is widely popular in the Baptist denomination, and particularly in the Independent Fundamentalist Baptist denomination. Hamilton married Dr. Garlock's daughter, Shelly, in 1975, and the couple managed Majesty Music for over 30 years. In 2014, Hamilton's son-in-law and daughter, Adam Morgan and Megan Hamilton Morgan, began writing and producing the new Patch the Pirate adventures and managing the company, continuing the family tradition. In 2017, Hamilton was diagnosed with early onset dementia, resulting in his no longer able to travel with his "crew" but they still keep performing.

Hamilton entered hospice care on April 16, 2023 and died on April 19 at the age of 72.

== Discography ==
- Sing Along with Patch the Pirate (1981)
- Patch the Pirate Goes to Space (1982)
- Patch the Pirate Goes West (1983)
- Patch the Pirate Goes to the Jungle (1984)
- Kidnapped on I-Land (1985)
- The Great American Time Machine (1986)
- The MisterSlippi River Race (1987)
- The Calliope Caper (1988)
- Camp Kookawacka Woods (1989)
- The Custards' Last Stand (1990)
- The Friendship Mutiny (1991)
- Once Upon a Starry Knight (1992)
- Down Under (1993)
- Harold the King (1993)
- The Evolution Revolution (1994)
- Mount Zion Marathon (1995)
- Giant Killer (1996)
- Polecat's Poison (1997)
- The Sneaky Sheik (1998)
- Afraidika Fever (1999)
- The Lone Stranger (2000)
- The Tumbleweed Opera (2001)
- Coldheartica (2002)
- Limerick the Leprechaun (2003)
- Shipwrecked on Pleasure Island (2004)
- The Kashmir Kid (2005)
- The Villain of Venice (2006)
- The Colonel's Colossal Character Quest (2007)
- Armadillo Amigos (2008)
- Kung Phooey Kid (2009)
- The Legend of Stickeyfoot (2010)
- Incrediworld (2011)
- Kingdom Chronicles (2012)
- International Sleuth Academy (2013) (originally titled International Spy Academy)
- Kilimanjaro (2014)
- Ocean Commotion (2015)
- Operation Arctic: Viking Invasion (2016)
- Time Twisters (2017)
- The Incredible Race (2018)
- The Final Voyage? (2019)
- Mystery Island (2020)
- Whale of a Tale (2021)
- A Tale of Two Siblings (2022)
- Passage to Paradise (2023)
- Danger in the Deep (2024)
- Switcher Snatchers (2025)
