= Dan Hamilton (politician) =

American politician

Member of the South Carolina House of Representatives from the 20th district
- In office 2008–2018
- Preceded by: Glenn Hamilton
- Succeeded by: Adam Morgan

Personal details
- Born: August 17, 1976 (age 50) Miami, Florida, U.S.
- Party: Republican
- Education: Bob Jones University (BA)

Daniel Paul Hamilton (born August 17, 1976) is an American politician. He was a member of the South Carolina House of Representatives from the 20th District, serving from 2008 to 2018, and a member of the Republican Party.

== Early life ==
Daniel Hamilton was born in Miami, Florida, on August 17, 1976, and adopted by Glenn and Joan Hamilton. He served as the Speaker of the Student Legislature of South Carolina from 1997 to 1998 and as field representative for U.S. Representative Jim DeMint from 1999 to 2001.

Hamilton graduated with a bachelor's degree in organizational communication from Bob Jones University in 1998.

== Political career ==
In 2008, Hamilton won the election to replace his father, Glenn Hamilton, who was retiring from the State House.

=== 2018 U.S. House campaign ===
Hamilton ran in the 2018 Republican primary to replace retiring Republican incumbent Trey Gowdy in South Carolina's 4th congressional district. He lost during the initial round.
