= Alan Morgan (politician) =

American politician

Member of the South Carolina House of Representatives from the 18th district
- Incumbent
- Assumed office June 15, 2022
- Preceded by: Tommy Stringer

Personal details
- Born: February 8, 1988 (age 38) Dallas, Texas, U.S.
- Party: Republican
- Spouse: Karis Elizabeth Morgan (m. 2021)
- Relations: Adam Morgan (politician) (brother)
- Education: Bob Jones University (BS)

Timothy Alan Morgan Jr. (born February 8, 1988) is an American politician. He is a member of the South Carolina House of Representatives from the 18th District. He was elected in a special election on May 24, 2022, and was sworn in on June 15, 2022. He was re-elected to office on November 8, 2022. He is a member of the Republican party.

Alan Morgan is the brother of Adam Morgan, who served in the South Carolina State House from the 20th District from 2018-2024.

Morgan is a member of the South Carolina Freedom Caucus. He also serves on the House Agriculture, Natural Resources & Environmental Affairs Committee.

== Biography ==
Morgan was born in Dallas, Texas, to Timothy and Michele Morgan. He graduated with a bachelor's degree in business administration from Bob Jones University in 2010. Before holding office, Morgan worked as a senior corporate trainer for Shellpoint Mortgage Servicing, service operations manager for Quantros, and salesforce administrator and data analyst for Polydeck.
