= Glenn Hamilton =

American politician (born 1938)

Member of the South Carolina House of Representatives from the 20th district
- In office 1997–2007
- Preceded by: Richard Herdklotz
- Succeeded by: Dan Hamilton

Personal details
- Born: January 7, 1938 (age 88) Miami, Florida, U.S.
- Party: Republican
- Education: Bob Jones University (BA)

Glenn Lewis Hamilton (born January 7, 1938) is an American politician. He was a member of the South Carolina House of Representatives from the 20th District, serving from 1997 to 2007. He is a member of the Republican Party.

== Early life and military career ==
Glenn Lewis Hamilton was born in Miami, Florida to Meade and Dorothy Hamilton. He attended Bob Jones University.

After his time at University, Hamilton served for seven years in the United States Navy. He trained as a pilot, flew antisub warfare and taught other pilots how to land on carriers. Following his military service, he was a pilot with Delta Air Lines for thirty three years.

== Political career ==
Hamilton chaired the House Interstate Cooperation Committee and served on the House Labor, Commerce and Industry Committee.

In 1997 he retired from the State House and his adopted son Dan Hamilton won the election to replace him.
