= Late Call (TV programme) =

Late Call was Scottish Television's version of The Epilogue, presenting five minutes of religious thought late at night. Launched in 1960, it was generally, but not always, the final programme of the day's transmission although it did continue for a short while after 24-hour broadcasting commenced in February 1988. The programme finally ended the following year.

It was parodied by Rikki Fulton in the comedy show Scotch and Wry where it was named "Last Call". One of his characters, Reverend I.M. Jolly, was an exaggerated version of the clerical and lay representatives from all the mainstream churches in Scotland who often featured in Late Call.

The programme was not the only programme from the Religious Department of Scottish Television, but arguably the best known. Producers were Rev. Dr Nelson Gray, a congregational minister, and Rev. Eric Hudson, a minister of the Church of Scotland.
