= American Catholic Radio =

American Catholic Radio (ACR) is a weekly half-hour program of Catholic information and inspiration aimed mainly at Catholic and Protestant Christian listeners. Originally hosted by Rev. Greg Friedman, O.F.M., Father Friedman retired from the program in December 2012. Segment producer Judy Zarick was promoted to program host and with the first weekly program broadcast in January 2013.

The program is produced weekly and distributed to broadcast stations in the United States and abroad. It began as a cooperative venture between the United States Conference of Catholic Bishops and St. Anthony Messenger Press. In 2010, St. Anthony Messenger took full ownership of the program while retaining some funding from the U.S.C.C.B. In 2012 St. Anthony Messenger Press changed its corporate name to "Franciscan Media".

The program is a "magazine" style format featuring inspiration first person interviews and topical interviews related to the teaching and practice of the Catholic Faith in America. With the change in host in January 2013 also came a change in emphasis. Complementing the theme of the United States Bishops document entitled, "Disciples Called to Witness; The New Evangelization," the American Catholic Radio program adopted the "Disciples Called to Witness" sub title and added a weekly interview with an American Catholic prelate oriented towards encouraging Catholics and Catholic parishes to adopt a focus on evangelization and nurturing disciples within their homes, communities, parishes and workplace.
