= Francie and Josie =

Scottish comedy double act (1958–1996)

- Also known as: The Adventures of Francie and Josie
- Created by: Rikki Fulton and Jack Milroy
- Starring: Rikki Fulton; Jack Milroy; Clement Ashby; Glen Michael; Ethel Scott
- Country of origin: Scotland
- No. of episodes: 32

Production
- Running time: 25 minutes

Original release
- Network: Scottish Television
- Release: 26 October 1962 – 15 August 1965

Francie and Josie were a double act performed by Scottish comedians Jack Milroy as Francie and Rikki Fulton as Josie, from 1958 until the 1990s.

== History ==
The Francie and Josie act first appeared on The Five Past Eight Show at the Alhambra Theatre Glasgow during the 1958 season, and was a brainwave of Stanley Baxter, Stan Mars and Rikki Fulton. Over the season, the idea grew and they refined the concept. There would often be a solo sketch from Francie and Josie separately, and then one with the two together at the end.

In 1962, Scottish Television gave them their own show, The Adventures of Francie and Josie, which also starred Clement Ashby, Glen Michael, and Ethel Scott (the first wife of Rikki Fulton). The show became a hit, being broadcast by Anglia, Border Television, Grampian Television, Tyne Tees and UTV, resulting in the pair appearing at the opening of many British Relay TV rental shops. Their first shop opening, in Airdrie, caused such mayhem that crowds smashed the store's windows.

In 1965, the last television series was produced, with the pair returning to The Five Past Eight Show the following year. Both Milroy and Fulton were given their own show on Scottish Television. The double act toured around Scotland, and also inspired a pantomime. In 1970, the pair successfully toured Northern Ireland.

In 1970, they released an LP, Francie & Josie, on Pye's Golden Guinea label, recorded at the Ashfield Club in Glasgow and produced by Cyril Stapleton. It featured a number of Fulton's compositions.

== Episodes ==
Over its course, 32 episodes were made between 1962 and 1965. There was no series made in 1964, due to a technicians' strike.

=== Series 1: 1962 ===
The first series consisted of reworkings of the original stage scripts.

- 26 October 1962 - "The Errant Knights"
- 2 November 1962 - "The TV Fans"
- 9 November 1962 - "The Souvenir Hunters"
- 16 November 1962 - "The Penpal"
- 23 November 1962 - "The Donors"
- 30 November 1962 - "The Patriots"

=== Series 2: 1963 ===
- 18 September 1963 - "The Guinea Pigs"
- 25 September 1963 - "The Princess"
- 2 October 1963 - "The So'jers"
- 9 October 1963 - "The Holiday"
- 16 October 1963 - "The Rivals"
- 23 October 1963 - "The Nightclub"
- 30 October 1963 - "The Banditos"
- 6 November 1963 - "The Stamp Collectors"
- 13 November 1963 - "The Housewarming"
- 20 November 1963 - "The Matchmakers"
- 27 November 1963 - "The Wallet"
- 11 December 1963 - "The Glesca Gallants"
- 31 December 1963 - "The Odd Job" (Francie absent)

=== Series 3: 1965 ===
- 2 February 1965 - "The Good Deed"
- 9 February 1965 - "The Decoy"
- 16 February 1965 - "The Birds"
- 23 February 1965 - "The Stowaways"
- 2 March 1965 - "The Volunteers"
- 9 March 1965 - "The Legacy"
- 16 March 1965 - "The Toff"
- 11 July 1965 - "The Luck o' the ...?"
- 18 July 1965 - "The Meat in the Sandwich"
- 25 July 1965 - "The Lovebirds"
- 1 August 1965 - "Licence to Kill"
- 8 August 1965 - "The Arty Crafty Brigade"
- 15 August 1965 - "Song Makers"

No episodes of The Adventures of Francie and Josie are known to have survived. Much of Scottish Television's early output was wiped and recorded over, a common practice in the television industry at the time.

== Characters ==
- Francie McKenzie — Francie is seen as the less intelligent one of the pair, but overrules Josie by telling jokes. He is more interested in "birds". He would often burst into laughter in the middle of Josie telling a story; the things he laughs at are usually not funny. For example, when Josie says: "I couldnae get a hud o' that Chinese waiter, ye know, the one wi' the funny walk." (Walk/Wok)
- Josie Tierney — Josie is the more intelligent one of the pair, interested in talking about culture and politics, prompting Francie to laugh at him. He would often muddle up his words to mean something different. Example: Josie: "There's no wonder that Glasgow has been decimated the city of architecture."
- Auntie Jessie — Auntie Jessie is the somewhat simple-minded woman who looked after Francie and Josie after both of their families had left home. She was referred to frequently in the stage shows, with the character being played by Jack Milroy's wife, Mary Lee.
- Glen Michael — Glen Michael played many parts on the show, including Josie's cousin when Milroy was ill.
- Pen-pal — The original sketches would start with an appearance by Francie's unnamed American pen-pal (called "Teenager" in the scripts), who referred to the duo as "Francis and Joseph", and puzzled over the Glaswegian slang in his letters. She was played by Fulton's wife, Ethel Scott.

== Revivals ==
After the success of the television series, the duo returned to the stage. Fulton suggested that he take over as scriptwriter as Stan Mars was moving on to America. The latter agreed, and gave Fulton licence to write the scripts.

Two revival shows were recorded at the King's Theatre, Glasgow, reuniting Fulton and Milroy: Francie and Josie (1989), which was broadcast on BBC Scotland, and The Farewell Performance (1996), which was direct-to-video.

In 2015, a show called Francie & Josie: The Return toured Scotland, starring Liam Dolan as Francie and Johnny Mac as Josie (credited as playing Milroy and Fulton, respectively).
