= Pettigrew & Stephens =

Former department store in Glasgow

Pettigrew & Stephens was a department store based in Sauchiehall Street, Glasgow.

== History ==
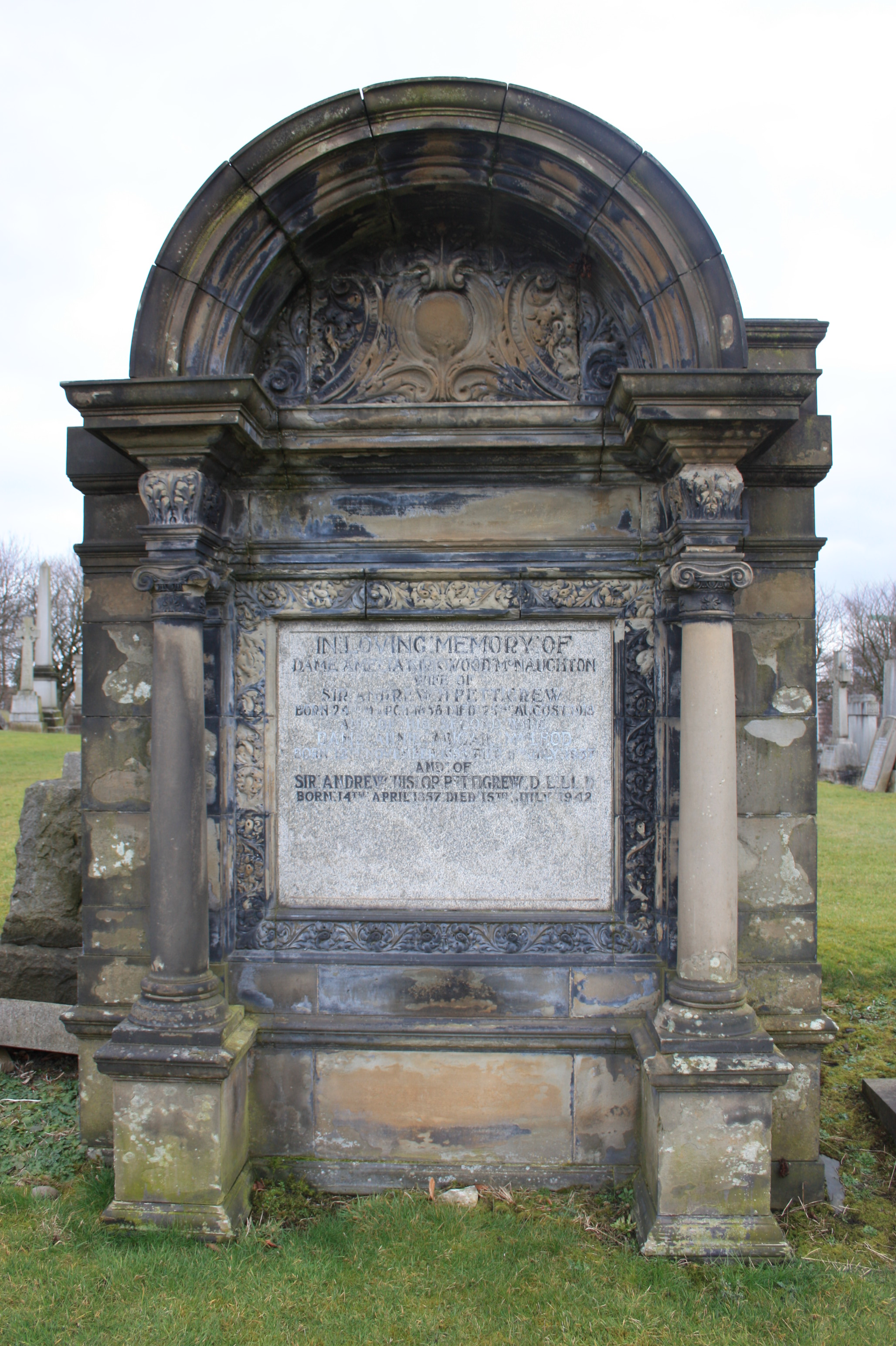
The grave of Sir Andrew Hislop Pettigrew, Glasgow Necropolis

In 1888, Andrew Hislop Pettigrew (1857-1942) and William Henry Stephens formed a partnership and opened a shop at 191-193 Sauchiehall Street (known as Manchester House) in Glasgow which Stephens already owned. However, by 1896, William Henry Stephens had died, leaving Andrew Hislop Pettigrew in sole charge.

By 1901, the store was rebuilt in a design by architects John Honeyman and John Keppie, with a gilt dome designed by Charles Rennie Mackintosh, and sold a wide range of goods, including clothes, millinery, confectionery, carpets, furniture, ironmongery and china. In 1904, Pettigrew incorporated the company, and leased the Fine Art Institute building at 171-179 Sauchiehall Street, using it as a furniture department.

During 1914, the store was extended, making it one of the biggest in Scotland, with a further extension being added in 1923 to incorporate a specialist men's department.

In 1925, Pettigrew retired and sold his shares to Austin Friars Investment Trust Ltd, of London (a Clarence Hatry company), which in turn sold the business in 1926 to the Scottish Drapery Corporation. The business was continued to be run as a separate company by the SDC until 1952, when the Corporation and all of its subsidiaries were purchased by House of Fraser.

The store continued to trade as Pettigrew & Stephens within the House of Fraser group, but its company status was wound up in 1955. In 1970, the store was moved from its location at 171-193 Sauchiehall Street to the site of Alexander Henderson, another department store recently bought by House of Fraser, as their site was earmarked for demolition (it was demolished in 1971 to make way for Sauchiehall Shopping Centre). The business continued at its new location until it closed in 1974.
