= Bill McMurdo =

Scottish football agent

William McMurdo is a Scottish football agent.

McMurdo has represented Northern Ireland international George Best. He has also represented football players such as Derek Johnstone, Mo Johnston, Frank McAvennie, Derek Ferguson and currently represents his son Lewis Ferguson.
