= Sermonette =

Sermonette (i.e., a small sermon) is a generic term for short, locally produced religious messages that were aired by many U.S. television stations during their sign-on and sign-off periods.

Sermonettes were generally about three to five minutes in length, and featured religious clergy from churches in the local station's coverage area. Reflecting the majority religious faith in the U.S., the clergy involved were almost always Christian (Protestant or Roman Catholic), although in TV markets with a large Jewish population, a rabbi would occasionally be called upon. Similarly, TV markets with a large Muslim population would call upon an imam. The segments were pre-taped for airing at their normally scheduled early morning or late night time slots.

Articles written for church bulletins are often sermonettes in essence. They contain an introduction, frequently a joke, a body or situation that is being addressed, a biblical equivalent and a wrap-up or point tying the illustration and scripture together in a meaningful way.

In the United Kingdom, similar short religious programs used to be broadcast at the end of the schedule, but were called "epilogues" (the BBC's was called The Epilogue) rather than "sermonettes" and broadcast on BBC and ITV. "Epilogue" was also the name of sermonettes aired in Australia at the end of each broadcast day. CTV affiliates in several Canadian cities aired sermonettes at the beginning or end of each broadcast day.
