= Gaiety Theatre, Ayr =

Theatre in Ayr, Scotland

Coordinates: 55.4614°N 4.6315°W

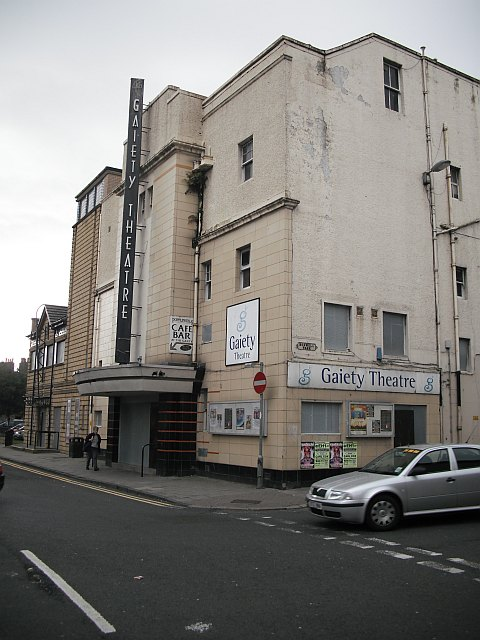
An image of Gaiety Theatre, Ayr

The Gaiety Theatre is a category B listed performing arts venue in Ayr, Scotland. It is noted for its interior rococo features, its atmosphere and its acoustics.

== Early history ==
The Ayr Gaiety was built in 1902, reconstructed after a fire in 1904, its façade remodeled in 1935, and further reinstated after a fire in 1955. In 1995, an annex was constructed, including a new café, box office, dressing rooms and studio space.

After a faltering start, which saw several years as a cinema after World War I, the theatre was bought by Ben Popplewell, from Bradford who already had a track record of success running the Pavilion theatre on Ayr seafront. For fifty years the Popplewell family ran the theatre – latterly as part of the Glasgow Pavilion business.

During this time, the Gaiety developed a reputation as a variety theatre with a ‘summer’ variety show – the Gaiety Whirl – which ran for 26 weeks at its height. Many Scottish and UK stars appeared regularly on its stage, and several started their careers there. The programme offered more than a summer show however, with several weeks of Shakespeare and regular transfers from Glasgow Citizens Theatre, being part of a varied offer.

After seventy years in private ownership the local Council acquired the Gaiety theatre freehold in 1974. It then operated as a municipal theatre under direct local authority management. The programming had much in common with the Popplewell years, with the Gaiety Whirl still a feature and the, by now, popular panto at the core of the programme. But the scope of performances developed and, while the family oriented theme continued, a wider range of presentations developed, including controversial shows such as Borderline Theatres production of Dario Fo’s Mistero Buffo and a touring version of Oh Calcutta!. After many years of successful operation the theatre began to lose audiences and the Council felt the revenue subsidy it provided and the requirement for capital investment required a new approach.

In January 2009 the theatre closed, leaving Ayr without a theatre – as the Civic Theatre, which had mainly presented drama, had been closed and demolished a little earlier due to asbestos contamination problems.

== South Ayrshire Council forced closure ==
The closure met with considerable opposition and dismay among many Ayr residents, particularly since it appeared that the required capital and revenue investment to reopen the theatre would not be available. A public meeting attracted over 400 attendees, the future of the theatre was a key issue in the local press, many Scottish performers expressed their dismay and there was extensive discussion on social media.

In early 2009 South Ayrshire Council invited tenders to take on the theatre management. Ayr Gaiety Partnership (AGP), a charity formed by local residents for the purpose in Summer 2009, secured preferred bidder status. Just over three years later, having secured financial backing from the Council and Scottish Government, as well as from local fundraising, AGP took on a 99-year lease of the theatre with a vision to do much more than simply re-open the building. Ayr Gaiety Partnerships vision is 'to re-energise the performing arts in South Ayrshire, with the Gaiety Theatre as the hub of a network of venues that will stimulate the cultural life and economic prosperity of the area ensuring that Ayr will once again be a key destination for all those interested in the performing arts.'

== Re-opening in 2012 ==
From the start the organisation set ambitious social, economic and cultural goals. But the first priority was to re-open with a successful panto. On 11 December 2012, after many last minute challenges, the Gaiety re-opened for what turned out to be a sell-out run of over 40 performances of the panto Cinderella.

== Ayr Gaiety Partnership ==
The Ayr Gaiety Partnership is a charitable body formed by local community figures, with membership open to local residents. The directors at present are: Ian Welsh, David Quayle, Chris Fremantle, Graham Peterkin, and Professor Gayle McPherson.

Membership is open to local residents and others with an interest in the theatre. Ayr Gaiety Partnership's first General Meeting is set to take place on 13 October 2014.

== Staff and volunteering at the Gaiety ==
The new Ayr Gaiety is unlike most theatres in the UK because it is largely run through voluntary effort. Most of the people undertaking front of house, technical, fundraising, marketing and maintenance are doing so on a voluntary basis. Although the volunteering effort overall is led by the Executive Director and Board- each volunteer team is supported and led by one of the staff team members.

The Gaiety's current full-time staff team consists of just nine employees led by Executive Director Jeremy Wyatt.

== Scotland's 1st learning theatre ==
The School of Media, Culture & Society at the University of the West of Scotland (UWS) and the Gaiety Theatre officially launched Scotland’s first Learning Theatre on Friday 19 September 2014. The launch event, which saw representatives from UWS, the Gaiety, as well as the National Theatre of Scotland in attendance, marks the first stage in the development of the partnership Learning Theatre, which will provide a centre for education, training and research in the area of performance and theatre craft.

UWS enjoys close links with the Gaiety and the University’s new BA Technical Theatre degree, delivered in conjunction with the Theatre, had its first intake in September. The course offers thorough vocational training for those looking to work in stage management and theatre production. Students will gain professional knowledge of the industry and will be prepared for a variety of employment opportunities from small-scale theatres to large multi-media events, venues and festivals. The course is aimed at those with a range of theatre, performance, production and related HND qualifications to enable them to build to a degree award in Technical Theatre. Students from the University's undergraduate Performance programme also make regular use of the theatre's facilities.
