= National Religious Broadcasters =

American association of evangelical Christian broadcasting groups

- National Religious Broadcasters logo
- Formation: 1944
- Headquarters: Washington, DC, United States
- Website: NRB.org

National Religious Broadcasters (NRB) is an international association of evangelical communicators. While theologically diverse within the evangelical community, NRB members are linked through a Declaration of Unity that proclaims their joint commitment and devotion to Christianity.

== History ==
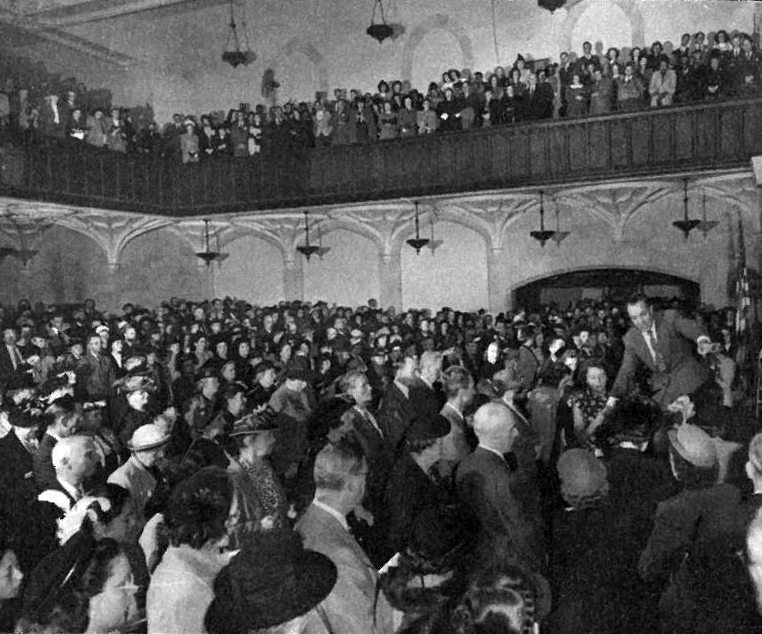
Evangelical broadcaster William Ward Ayer (far right), who would later become the first president of the National Religious Broadcasters, stands before a congregation during an altar call at New York's Calvary Baptist Church. The altar call was carried live by radio.

In the early 1940s in America, the emerging culture of hostility between mainline Protestant denominations and the rapidly growing evangelical Protestant movement reached a crisis phase in the world of radio broadcasting. Protestant denominational leaders argued for regulations that would restrict access to the radio broadcast spectrum. They claimed independent Evangelical preachers who were unaccountable to any denominational entity could not be trusted with the public airwaves.

In those early years of radio broadcasting, pioneer Evangelical broadcasters like William Ward Ayer, Paul Rader, Donald Grey Barnhouse, Walter A. Maier, and Charles Fuller had built radio audiences in the millions and were faithfully proclaiming the Gospel of Jesus Christ. By 1942, the Mutual Broadcasting System received more than 25% of its total revenue from religious broadcasters.

Yet in 1943, the Federal Council of Churches (later renamed the National Council of Churches) supported proposed regulations that would have resulted in every Evangelical broadcaster being taken off the national radio networks. They demanded that religious broadcasting should only be aired as a public service during free or "sustaining" time donated by the radio networks. They further argued that these public service slots should only be allocated to "responsible" religious broadcasters that had been approved by local and national denominational councils – like themselves.

The Federal Council of Churches persuaded all three national radio networks – NBC, CBS, and the Mutual Broadcasting System – to adopt the proposed regulations. Subsequently, every Evangelical Christian broadcaster was taken off the national radio networks, with their only access being small independent stations with a very limited audience.

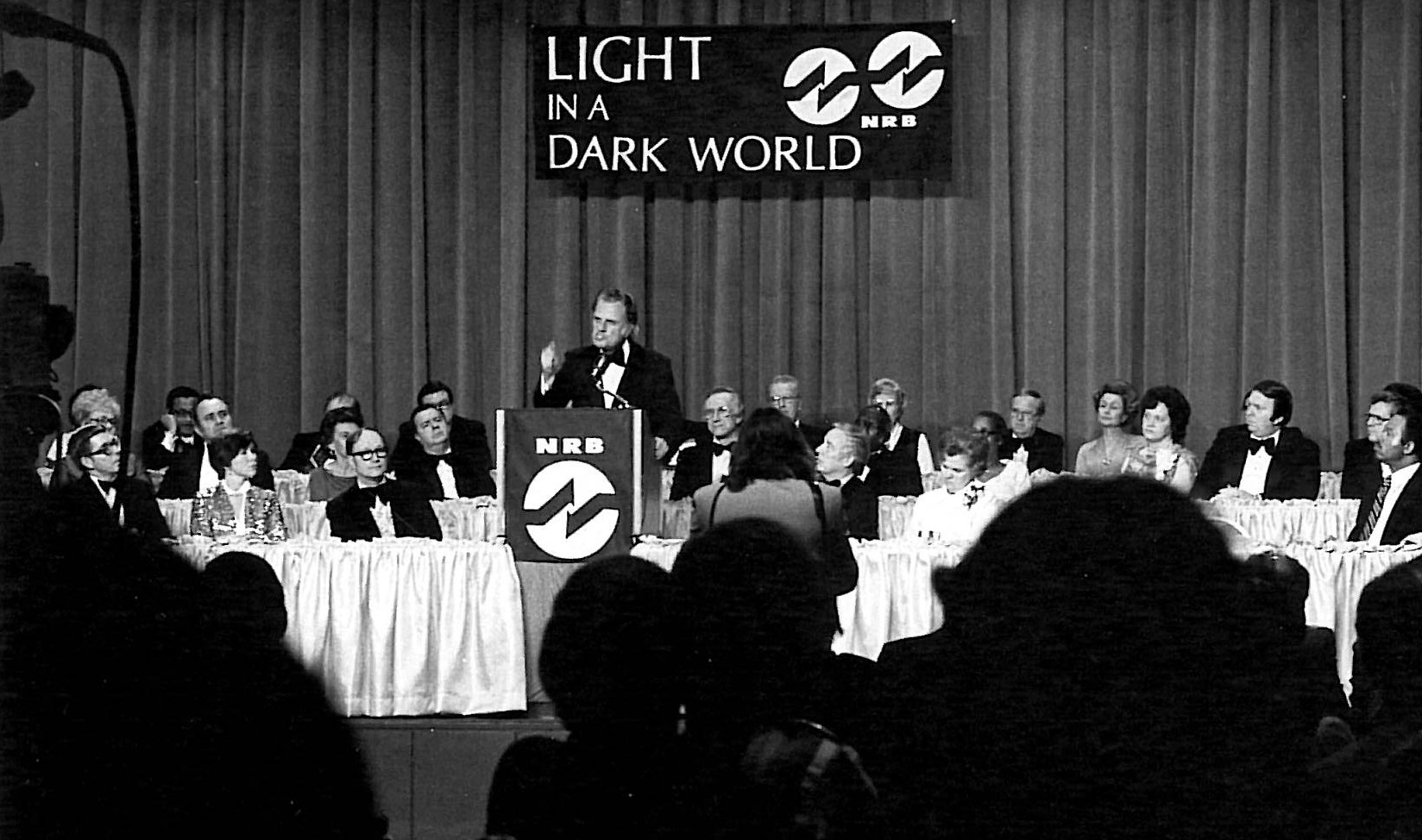
Evangelist Billy Graham speaks at the NRB convention, 1977.

In response to this challenge, 150 Evangelical Christian broadcasters and church leaders held a series of meetings which led to the formation of the National Religious Broadcasters (NRB). In the fall of 1944, members of the NRB adopted their Constitution, Bylaws, Statement of Faith, and Code of Ethics. And thus began a multi-year effort by NRB to build credibility for Evangelical broadcasters, to secure available public interest slots, and to overturn the ban on the purchase of radio airtime for religious broadcasting.

In 1949 the newly formed ABC radio network reversed the ban on paid religious broadcasting, with the other networks following their lead. In a few years, Evangelical radio broadcasters were again on major radio networks with scores of new programs.

The NRB now operates in a more complex electronic media environment, while retaining its original focus of defending and expanding access to electronic media platforms for Christian evangelism. And the audience for religious broadcasters has expanded, with 141 million Americans using Christian media at least once per month.

== Membership ==
Members of the association are required to ascribe to the Statement of Faith and adhere to the NRB Code of Ethics. NRB members must also meet the Standards of Financial Accountability set forth by the Evangelical Council for Financial Accountability (ECFA).

== Governance ==
NRB members elect a Board of Directors and five Officers for the association. The five Officers, along with five Members-At-Large elected from the board of directors, form an Executive Committee that governs the association.

== Controversy ==
On 27 August 2021 NRB fired its senior vice president of communications, Daniel Darling, because he expressed support for the use of vaccines to fight the COVID-19 pandemic. This was done in the midst of a precipitous rise in COVID-19 deaths blamed largely on low vaccination rates against the disease.

In April 2026 NRB filed a complaint with the Federal Elections Commission, asking the agency to investigate ABC over a satirical Jimmy Kimmel Live show scene.
