= Rikki Fulton =

Scottish actor (1924–2004)

Rikki Fulton OBE
- Fulton as painted by Thomas Kluge in 1997
- Born: Robert Kerr Fulton; 15 April 1924; Glasgow, Scotland
- Died: 27 January 2004 (aged 79); Glasgow, Scotland
- Years active: 1947–2002
- Spouses: Ethel Scott (m. 1949; div. 1968) Kate Matheson (m. 1969)

Robert Kerr "Rikki" Fulton (15 April 1924 – 27 January 2004) was a Scottish comedian and actor best remembered for writing and performing in the long-running BBC Scotland sketch show Scotch and Wry. He was also known for his appearances as one half of the double act, Francie and Josie, alongside Jack Milroy.

== Early life ==
The youngest of three brothers, Robert Kerr Fulton was born into a non-theatrical family at 46 Appin Road, Dennistoun, Glasgow. Fulton's mother, who was 40 at the time of his birth, developed severe postnatal depression. Due to this, Fulton grew up a "solitary child" and developed a "voracious reading habit" throughout his childhood. His father was a master locksmith who changed trades, purchasing a newsagent and stationery shop at 28 Roebank Street, Dennistoun. At the age of three, Fulton and his family moved to Riddrie, another district of Glasgow. There he attended the local primary school but later returned to Dennistoun for his secondary education at Whitehill Secondary School.

Fulton completed his education in 1939 and decided to start in the acting profession after a backstage visit at the Glasgow Pavilion Theatre. In 1941, aged 17, Fulton joined the Royal Navy. The following year he was posted to HMS Ibis, but that November the ship was sunk in the Bay of Algiers. Fulton spent five hours in the water before being rescued. He later joined the Coastal Forces for D-Day, travelling back and forth between Gosport and Arromanches with vital supplies. In 1945, four years after signing up, Fulton was invalided out of the Navy due to blackouts, leaving with the rank of sub-lieutenant.

== Career ==
Fulton began his professional acting career in straight theatre, primarily performing in repertory theatre and on BBC Radio, including The Gowrie Conspiracy in 1947. Alongside acting, he worked in the family stationery business with his brothers. After the bank withdrew its financial support, he committed himself fully to his acting career.

In the early 1950s, Fulton moved to London and became the compère of The Show Band Show, working alongside the likes of singer Frank Sinatra. After a short period, Fulton returned to Scotland to perform for Howard & Wyndham Ltd in pantomime from 1956 at the Alhambra Theatre, Glasgow with Jimmy Logan and Kenneth McKellar followed by the "Five Past Eight" summer revues with Stanley Baxter and Fay Lenore.

In 1957 he appeared, with Tommy Steele, as the Dame in the pantomime Goldilocks and the Three Bears at the Royal Court Theatre, Liverpool. His 1958 pantomime appearance was in Sinbad The Sailor at the Alhambra Theatre, Glasgow In 1959 he appeared again in Sinbad The Sailor, with Reg Varney at the King's Theatre, Edinburgh.

In 1960, he headlined in the new Scottish pantomime "A Wish for Jamie," with Kenneth McKellar, Fay Lenore and Reg Varney, which premiered at the Alhambra Theatre Glasgow, and in its sequel "A Love for Jamie," which ran for three consecutive winters. He starred in pantomime and Five Past Eight in Edinburgh and Aberdeen. While working at the King's Theatre, Edinburgh, Fulton met comedian Jack Milroy. Together they created a stage double act named "Francie and Josie", two Teddy Boys from Glasgow. In one of his first forays into television, Fulton brought the act to television in 1962's Scottish Television series, The Adventures of Francie and Josie. The series established both Fulton and Milroy as household names in Scotland. In 1970 and 1989, they were jointly named Scotland's "Light Entertainers of the Year". In 1977, Fulton produced "The Scotched Earth Show" with Gordon Menzies for the BBC. Menzies later produced Fulton's most popular sketch series, Scotch and Wry.

Fulton continued to perform regularly in pantomime and in straight theatre, mostly notably with the Royal Lyceum Company in Edinburgh and the Scottish Theatre Company based in Glasgow. However, it was the comedy sketch show, Scotch and Wry, that became a Hogmanay institution. The series featured one of Fulton's most remembered characters, the Reverend I.M. Jolly, a dour, depressed minister prone to inappropriate television conversations. The series began in 1978 and continued for 15 years, and was shown only once throughout the United Kingdom in 1983. Fulton was named Scottish Television Personality of the Year in 1963 and 1979.

In 1981, Fulton played Oliphant in the Scottish Theatre Company's production of Robert Kemp's play, Let Wives Tak Tent. In 1982, he made an appearance in the film Gorky Park, where he played a KGB officer. Director Michael Apted chose Fulton for the role because "he [Apted] had never seen such cruel eyes". He also performed in Bill Forsyth's Local Hero and Comfort and Joy. In 1985, under the pseudonym "Rabaith", Fulton, along with Denise Coffey, adapted the French playwright Molière's, Le Bourgeois Gentilhomme as A Wee Touch o' Class. He performed in the lead role at that year's Edinburgh Fringe; the Festival re-booked it for the following year and it went on tour throughout Scotland.

Fulton made several guest appearances in other BBC Scotland programmes. Alongside his Scotch and Wry co-stars Gregor Fisher and Tony Roper, Fulton made two appearances in Rab C. Nesbitt; once in 1988 and 10 years later in 1998. In 1992, Fulton was awarded the Officer of the Order of the British Empire (OBE) and a year later the Lifetime Achievement award from BAFTA Scotland. In 1994, he again appeared alongside Fisher as Dan McPhail, The Vital Spark's engineer, in The Tales of Para Handy. In 1996, after 36 years of performing as Francie and Josie, Fulton and Milroy appeared in their "Final Farewell" at the King's Theatre, Glasgow. Milroy later died in 2001, aged 85 years.

Fulton's last full performance on television came on New Year's Eve 1999 with the comedy special It's a Jolly Life and his final Last Call monologue as the Reverend I.M. Jolly. After saying his final goodbye to television, Fulton wrote and published his autobiography, Is It That Time Already? (1999). In 1994, Fulton was awarded an honorary Doctor of Arts from Abertay University, Dundee, in 1995 an honorary Doctor of Letters from the University of Strathclyde and in 2000 another honorary Doctor of Letters from the University of St Andrews.

== Personal life ==
Fulton was first married to actress Ethel Scott, who appeared with him on The Rikki Fulton Show in 1960 and 1961. While separated from their respective partners, Fulton met Audrey Matheson Craig-Brown (known as Kate Matheson), an actress 13 years his junior. Matheson saw Fulton perform in a production of Noël Coward's Hay Fever, but it would be 17 years before they met in person. After one day together, Fulton proposed and they married in 1969. In 1976, Matheson became pregnant but later lost the baby.

In 1998, Fulton began to display symptoms of Alzheimer's disease. In 2001, his wife recalled that "he [Fulton] returned home and devastatingly informed her, "I can't remember my lines any more". In 2002, after being diagnosed with the disease, Fulton remained at his own home and fronted that year's Alzheimer Scotland Christmas appeal. He grew to depend on Kate more and more until, eventually, it was decided he move into the Quayside nursing home. In 2003, after breaking his hip in a fall, he was admitted to the Western Infirmary and then to Gartnavel Royal Hospital for assessment. After contracting the "superbug" MRSA and returning to Quayside, Fulton died on 27 January 2004, aged 79.

Fulton's death sparked numerous dedications in his memory. The then-BBC Scotland Controller, John McCormick, said "he [Fulton] was a legend for people across the whole country."

Fulton's funeral took place six days after his death. In tribute to his Scotch and Wry character Supercop (a police traffic officer), police motorcyclists escorted the funeral cortège as it made its way to Clydebank Crematorium. The Reverend Alastair Symington, who was a close friend of Fulton, led the service, which featured tributes from Fulton's widow and Tony Roper. Symington had previously collaborated with Fulton on the book, For God's Sake, Ask!. Both Rikki and his wife were strong supporters of the Scottish SPCA, which received a financial donation following Fulton's funeral. A Scottish SPCA inspector represented the animal welfare organisation at the service.

Kate Matheson died in 2005 after completing a book about her relationship with Fulton, entitled Rikki & Me. For her funeral in Glasgow, Matheson requested no black ties should be worn because "we [she and Fulton] were together again".

== Theatre ==
Year	Title	Role	Company	Director	Notes
1972	Kidnapped	James More MacGregor, Duke of Argyll	Lyceum Theatre, Edinburgh	Bill Bryden	adaptation by Keith Dewhurst
1981	Let Wives Tak Tent	Oliphant	Scottish Theatre Company	Ewan Hooper, David Thompson	play by Robert Kemp
1988	Iolanthe	Lord Chancellor	Scottish Opera, Theatre Royal, Glasgow		operetta by Gilbert & Sullivan

== Filmography ==
- Laxdale Hall (1953)
- Dance Party Roof (1957–1958)
- The Rikki Fulton Show (1960)
- The Five Past Eight (1960's)
- The Adventures of Francie and Josie (1962–1965)
- The Grand Tour (1965)
- The Rikki Fulton Hour (1965)
- Rikki (1966)
- The Scotched Earth Show (1977)
- Scotch and Wry (1978)
- Out with the Old, in with the New (1978)
- The Miser (1979)
- Charles Endell Esquire (1979)
- Square Mile of Murder (1980)
- It Ain't Half Hot Mum (1980)
- The Winter's Tale (1981)
- The Dollar Bottom (1981)
- The House on the Hill (1981)
- Bergerac (1983)
- Local Hero (1983)
- Boswell for the Defence (1983)
- Gorky Park (1983)
- The Country Diary of an Edwardian Lady (1984)
- Comfort and Joy (1984)
- The Girl in the Picture (1985)
- The Holy City (1986)
- Supergran (1986)
- Rab C. Nesbitt (1988, 1998)
- Tis' the Season to Be Jolly (1993)
- Jolly: A Man for All Seasons (1994)
- The Tales of Para Handy (1994–1995)
- Jolly: A Life (1995)
- It's a Jolly Life (1999)

== Notable characters ==
- Scotch and Wry

Supercop a frequently dimwitted traffic cop who rides a motorbike, his trademark is how he removes his goggles (pings off and flies off camera), is often getting into more trouble than those he stops. Carries a small pocket sized notepad and pencil.

Rev. I. M. Jolly is portrayed as a pessimistic and world weary minister of the Church of Scotland who hosts the fictional programme Last Call. In the show, he speaks directly to the audience about events from his week in a subdued and reflective manner. His delivery is consistently understated and melancholic.

Rev. David Goodchild a minister who offered a few thoughts on "Last Call" and has an unfortunate mix up between his water and neat gin. Rev. David Goodchild is often confused with Rev. I.M. Jolly, but they were two different people.

Dickie Dandruff owner of "The Fourways Café" also goes by the moniker "The Gallowgate Gourmet" and presents a cooking segment called "Dirty Dick's Delicat'messen" where he prepares food in comedic style from his filthy café kitchen in the Gallowgate area of Glasgow.

- Francie and Josie

Josie is also another character from his comedy show "Francie and Josie" with co-star Jack Milroy who played "Francie".
