= North Central High School (Indianapolis) =

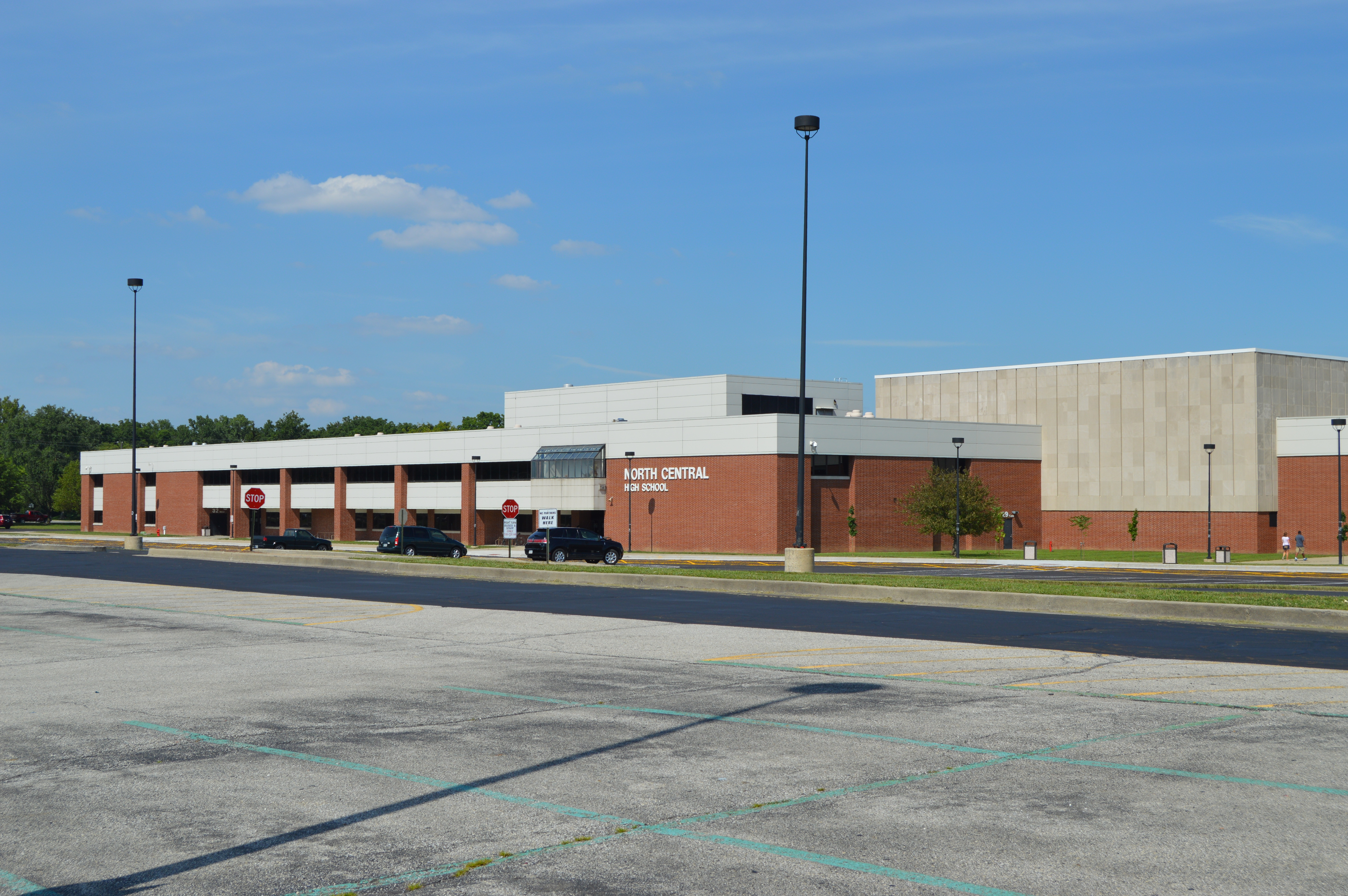

Location
- 1801 East 86th Street; Indianapolis, Marion County, Indiana 46240; United States; 39°54′40″N 86°07′45″W

Information
- Type: Public high school
- Motto: Achievement through scholarship, honesty and respect.
- Established: 1956
- School district: Metropolitan School District of Washington Township
- Principal: Jagga Rent
- Faculty: 188
- Grades: 9-12
- Enrollment: 3,616 (2023-2024)
- Color
- Athletics conference: Metropolitan Interscholastic Conference
- Mascot: Panther
- Publication: NCHS Live! (www.nchslive.com)
- Newspaper: The Northern Lights
- Yearbook: The Northerner
- Website: www.nchs.cc

North Central High School is a public high school in Indianapolis, Indiana, United States. It is part of the Metropolitan School District of Washington Township.

== History ==
North Central was established in 1956 in response to Washington Township's rapidly growing population and the desire of residents to have a local high school. Prior to this, students from the township attended Broad Ripple High School and Shortridge High School in Indianapolis. (At this time, most of the township was outside the city limits.) In 1963 the current facility was opened, and the original building was repurposed to Northview Middle School.

== Demographics ==
For the 2015–2016 school year, enrollment was 3,636 students. 41% were Black, 35% were white, 14% were Hispanic, 6% were multiracial, and 4% were Asian. 42% qualified for free lunches and 6% of the student body qualified for reduced-price lunches.

For the 2020–21 school year, enrollment was 3,754 students. Of these, 38% were Black, 33% were white, 19% were Hispanic, 6% were multiracial, and 4% were Asian. 45% of students qualified for free lunches and 2% qualified for reduced-price lunches.

== Music ==
The North Central Wind Ensemble has been named the ISSMA State Concert Band Champions six times (2004, 2006, 2007, 2009, 2010, and 2011).

The North Central High School Symphony Orchestra has been named the ISSMA State Concert Orchestra Champions ten times (1985, 1989, 1990, 1991, 1992, 1994, 2006, 2007, 2009, and 2014).

The North Central Counterpoints show choir have been named the ISSMA State Concert Choir Grand Champions fifteen times (1990, 1991, 1992, 1994, 2000, 2001, 2002, 2003, 2004, 2005, 2006, 2007, 2008, 2009, 2011) and the State Show Choir Grand Champions eleven times (2005, 2006, 2009, 2010, 2011, 2012, 2013, 2015, 2016, 2018, 2019).

== Notable alumni ==
- Adam Alexander, NASCAR Camping World Series broadcaster, SpeedTV contributor, anchor
- Charly Arnolt, sports broadcaster and right-wing TV personality
- Angela Berry-White, head coach of the IU Indy Jaguars women's soccer team
- Gregory S. Boebinger, professor of physics at Florida State University
- Tom Borton, jazz saxophonist, songwriter, composer, and former CEO of Los Angeles Post Music, Inc.
- Todd Brewster, journalist and author
- Cheryl Bridges, former marathon world record holder and first woman to obtain an athletic scholarship at a U.S. university
- Sean Buck, Navy Vice Admiral, 63rd Superintendent of the United States Naval Academy
- A'Lelia Bundles, author and journalist
- Priyanka Chopra, Indian actress, singer, film producer
- Mitch Daniels, Governor of Indiana (2005–13), president of Purdue University (2013–2022)
- Jeff Davis, former NASCAR driver
- Dorian, rapper
- Melinda Darby Dyar, planetary geologist and mineralogist
- Andrew East, American football player
- Kenneth "Babyface" Edmonds, musician, multi- platinum selling producer, with over 100 top 10 hits for various artists
- Hugh Fink, comedian, former Saturday Night Live writer (1995–2002)
- Jared Fogle, spokesperson and convicted felon
- Ray Gaddis, retired soccer player for the Philadelphia Union in Major League Soccer.
- Jason Gardner, 1999 Indiana Mr. Basketball, Final Four participant at The University of Arizona. Current director of player relations at Arizona. He briefly returned to North Central for the 2020–21 season to serve as the boys basketball head coach.
- Eric Gordon, 2007 Indiana Mr. Basketball, former Indiana Hoosiers point guard. 2008 NBA Draft: 1st round, 7th pick to Los Angeles Clippers.
- Patty Guggenheim, actress and comedian
- Amber Harris, 2006 Indiana Miss Basketball, pro basketball player for Chicago Sky, 2-time WNBA champion
- Adnan Hodžić, former professional basketball player
- Chase Infiniti, American actress
- Marie Collins Johns, former president & CEO, Verizon, mayoral candidate for Washington, D.C.
- Ro James, musician
- Ronnie Johnson, basketball player
- Scott A. Jones, co-founder of Boston Technologies and ChaCha
- Jim Jontz, former member of the United States House of Representatives
- Peter Kassig, aid worker, taken hostage and ultimately executed by The Islamic State.
- Ron Klain, White House Chief of Staff to President Joe Biden, former chief of staff to former vice president Al Gore, and was chief of staff to Biden when he was vice president
- Jon Krahulik, justice of the Indiana Supreme Court.
- Darius Latham, former NFL football player
- Brad Leaf, American-Israeli basketball player for Hapoel Galil Elyon and Maccabi Tel Aviv of the Israel Premier League
- Todd Lickliter, former Butler University and Iowa Hawkeyes head men's basketball coach
- David Logan, basketball player for Dinamo Basket Sassari
- Mary Mackey, novelist and poet
- Maicel Malone-Wallace, 1996 Olympic Gold Medalist 4x400 Relay
- Derrick Mayes football wide receiver at Notre Dame and the Green Bay Packers
- Diana Mercer, author and Huffington Post columnist
- Skip Mills, former professional basketball player
- Susan Neville, Professor of English at Butler University and Flannery O'Connor Award-winning author.
- Janis Oldham, mathematician
- Bart Peterson, politician, former mayor of Indianapolis
- Ginny Purdy, former professional tennis player
- Stephanie Reece, former professional tennis player
- Matt Reiswerg, soccer player and coach
- Courtney Roby, NFL football player, also played football at Indiana University
- Paul Scherrer, actor
- Marquese Scott, street and animation dancer
- Jordan Seabrook, former professional soccer player
- David Simon, real estate developer
- Ken Smith, former NFL football player
- Chad Spann, NFL football player
- Liz Stauber, actress, Almost Famous
- Marc Summers, television personality, Double Dare game show Nickelodeon, currently Unwrapped, Food Network
- Lars Tate, Gatorade National High School football player of the year, University of Georgia and NFL starter
- McKinley Tennyson, former professional soccer player
- Gary Thurman, Major League Baseball player
- Troy Van Voorhis, MIT chemistry professor and speaker at The Veritas Forum
- John Von Ohlen, jazz drummer who played in the bands of Woody Herman and Stan Kenton
- Ray Wallace, former NFL running back
- Lauren Weedman, writer and performer
- Kris Wilkes, 2017 Indiana Mr. Basketball and former college basketball player for UCLA
- Jordan Williams-Lambert, professional football wide receiver
- David Wolf, astronaut
- Futsum Zienasellassie, Professional long-distance runner and cross country Gatorade player of the year in 2012

== See also ==
- List of schools in Indianapolis
- List of high schools in Indiana
