= Gary Habermas =

American New Testament scholar (born 1950)

- Born: Gary Robert Habermas; June 28, 1950 (age 76); Detroit, Michigan, U.S.

Academic background
- Education: William Tyndale College (B.R.E., 1972); University of Detroit (M.A., 1973); Michigan State University (Ph.D., 1976)
- Thesis: The Resurrection of Jesus: A Rational Inquiry (1976)

Academic work
- Discipline: Theology; philosophy; New Testament studies
- School or tradition: Evangelicalism
- Institutions: Liberty University (since 1981); William Tyndale College (1979–1981)
- Main interests: Resurrection of Jesus
- Website: www.garyhabermas.com

Gary Habermas (born June 28, 1950) is an American New Testament scholar and theologian who frequently writes and lectures on the resurrection of Jesus. As Habermas states, he "has specialized in cataloging and communicating trends among scholars in the field of historical Jesus and New Testament studies." As of August 2026, Habermas was a distinguished research professor of Apologetics and Philosophy, in the Liberty University School of Divinity, in Lynchburg, Virginia, and a former chair of the Philosophy Department there.

== Early life and education ==
Habermas was born Gary Robert Habermas on June 28, 1950 in Detroit, Michigan.

Habermas earned a master's degree from the University of Detroit in philosophical theology in 1973. He received his Doctor of Philosophy degree in interdisciplinary studies from Michigan State University in 1976; his thesis was titled, "The Resurrection of Jesus: A Rational inquiry".

== Career ==
As of August 2026, Habermas was a Distinguished Research Professor of Apologetics and Philosophy, in the Liberty University School of Divinity, in Lynchburg, Virginia. He has in past been the Chairman of the Department of Philosophy there. As Habermas states in his biographical sketch at The Veritas Forum, he "has specialized in cataloging and communicating trends among scholars in the field of historical Jesus and New Testament studies."

Habermas is the creator of the "minimal facts argument," an apologetic method that uses what Habermas has claimed are widely accepted assumptions about Jesus to advocate for the historicity of his resurrection. In 2016, Habermas described the relevant "minimal facts" as those recognized by "the vast majority of even critical scholars".

== Reception ==
In his memoir Seeking Allah, Finding Jesus, Nabeel Qureshi relates how Habermas was influential in his conversion to Christianity, and describes him as looking like "a mix between Santa Claus and an offensive lineman".

== Personal life ==
Habermas formerly coached the Liberty Flames club hockey team for 9 years.

== Works ==
=== Books ===
- Habermas, Gary R.; Flew, Antony G. N. (1987). Did Jesus Rise from the Dead? The Resurrection Debate. San Francisco, CA: Harper & Row. ISBN 9780060635497. OCLC 14903934.
- ——— (1990). Dealing With Doubt. Chicago, IL: Moody Press. ISBN 9780802422507. OCLC 22971399.
- ———; Stevenson, Kenneth (1990). The Shroud and the Controversy. Nashville, TN: Thomas Nelson. ISBN 9780840771742. OCLC 20391758.
- ——— (1984). Ancient Evidence for the Life of Jesus: Historical Records of His Death and Resurrection. Nashville, TN: Thomas Nelson. ISBN 9780840759191. OCLC 11468656.
- ——— (1996). The Historical Jesus: Ancient Evidence for the Life of Christ. Joplin, MO: College Press. ISBN 9780899007328. OCLC 34549074.
- ——— (1999). The Thomas Factor: Using Your Doubts to Draw Closer to God. Nashville, TN: Broadman & Holman. ISBN 9780805417203. OCLC 39936227.
- ——— (2003). The Risen Jesus & Future Hope. Lanham, MD: Rowman & Littlefield. ISBN 9780742532861. OCLC 51799265.
- ———; Moreland, James P. (2004). Beyond Death: Exploring the Evidence for Immortality. Wheaton, IL: Crossway. ISBN 9780891079996. OCLC 38023970.
- ———; Licona, Michael R. (2004). The Case for the Resurrection of Jesus. Grand Rapids, MI: Kregel. ISBN 9780825427886. OCLC 123818389.
- ———; Flew, Antony G. N. (2005). Resurrected?: An Atheist and Theist Dialogue. Lanham, MD: Rowman & Littlefield. ISBN 9780742542259. OCLC 56371182.
- ———; Thomas, John C. (2008). What's Good about Feeling Bad?: Finding Purpose and a Path through Your Pain. Carol Stream, IL: Tyndale Press. ISBN 9781414316895. OCLC 223940588.
- ———; Flew, Antony G. N. (2009). Baggett, David (ed.). A Conversation with Gary Habermas and Antony Flew: Did the Resurrection Happen?. Veritas books. Downers Grove, IL: InterVarsity Press. ISBN 9780830837182. OCLC 300029735.
- ——— (2010). Why is God Ignoring Me?. Carol Stream, IL: Tyndale House Publishers. ISBN 9781414316888. OCLC 436617333.

=== Edited by ===
- ———; Geivett, R. Douglas, eds. (1997). In Defence of Miracles: a comprehensive case for God's action in history. Downers Grove, IL: IVP Academic. ISBN 9780830815289. OCLC 35714776.
- ———; Walls, Jerry; Baggett, David, eds. (2008). C.S. Lewis as Philosopher: truth, goodness and beauty. Downers Grove, IL: IVP Academic. ISBN 9780830828081. OCLC 183608700.
- ———; Stewart, Robert B., eds. (2010). Memories of Jesus: a critical appraisal of James D.G. Dunn's Jesus remembered. Nashville, TN: B&H Academic. ISBN 9780805448405. OCLC 462895848.
