= Michael R. Licona =

American historian

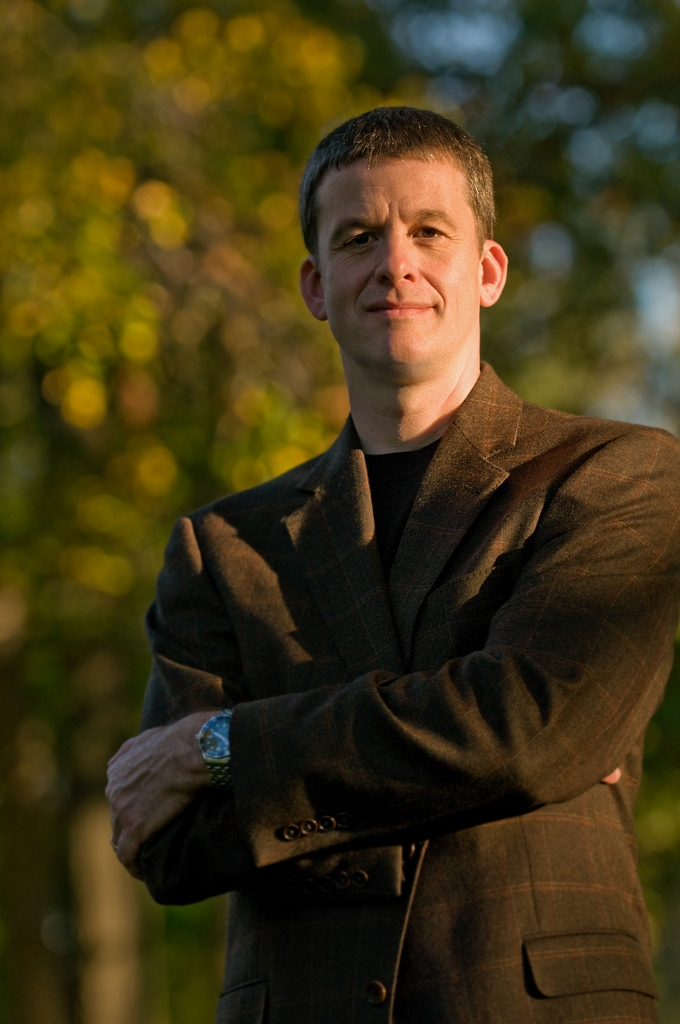
- Born: 1961 (age 64–65); Baltimore, Maryland, U.S.

Academic background
- Education: Liberty University (MA); University of Pretoria (PhD)
- Thesis: The Historicity of the Resurrection of Jesus: historiographical considerations in the light of recent debates (2008)
- Website: Risen Jesus

Michael R. Licona (born 1961) is an American New Testament scholar, author, and Christian apologist. He is Professor of New Testament Studies at Houston Christian University, Extraordinary Associate Professor of Theology at North-West University and the director of Risen Jesus, Inc. Licona specializes in the resurrection of Jesus, and in the literary analysis of the Gospels as Greco-Roman biographies.

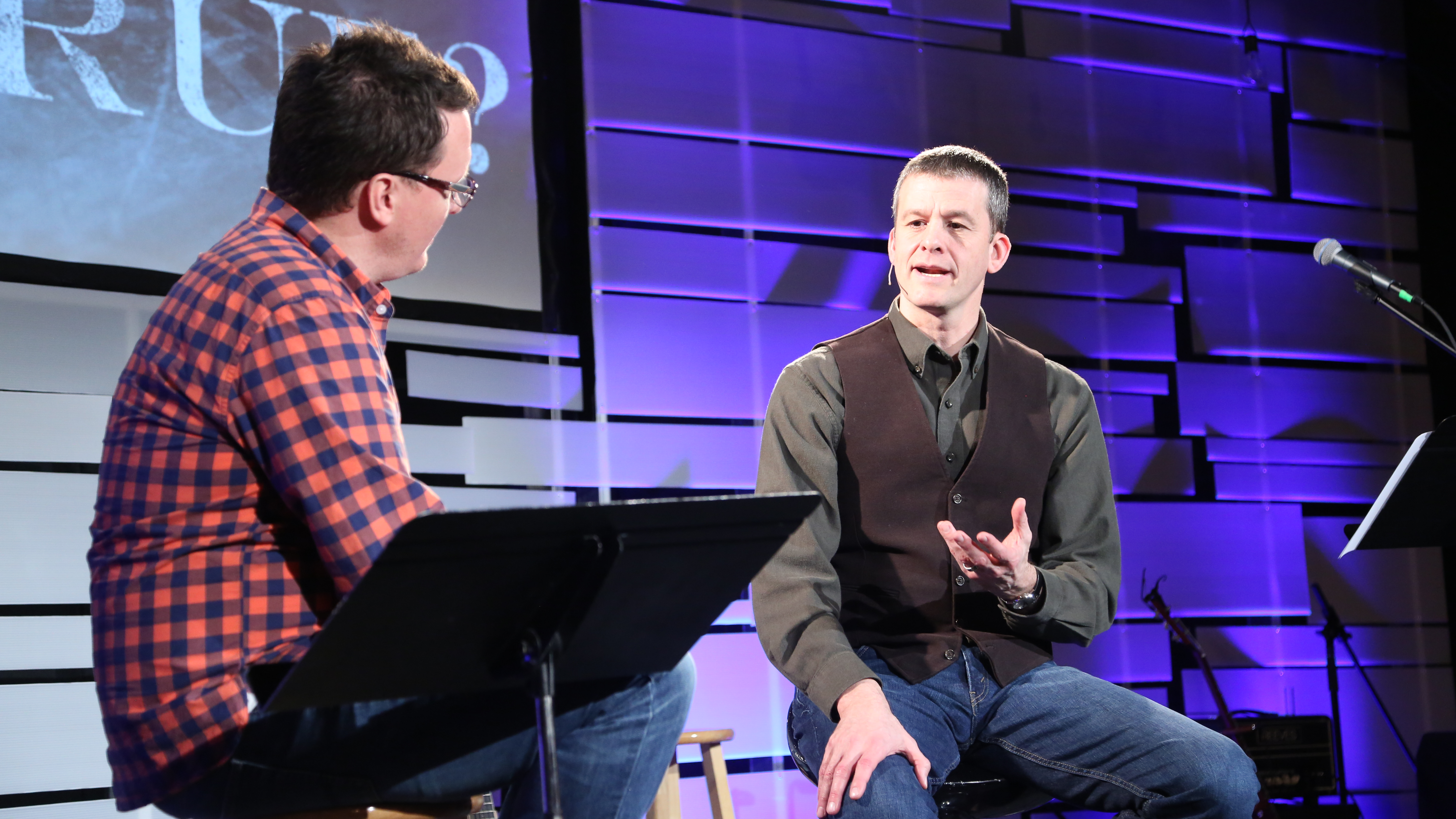
Interview with Brian Marshall at the Christian Student Fellowship at the University of Kentucky

== Biography ==
Licona was raised in a Christian family. When he entered Liberty University, he planned to become a musician and obtained a bachelor's degree in music performance (saxophone).

Licona has a M.A. in religious studies from Liberty University and a Ph.D. in New Testament studies from the University of Pretoria, which he earned with distinction. He served as an apologetics coordinator at the North American Mission Board (Southern Baptist Convention) from 2005 through 2011. Licona has lectured on more than 100 university campuses and has appeared on television and radio programs.

In 2012, Licona was hired as Associate Professor of Theology at Houston Baptist University (now Houston Christian University). In 2023, he was promoted to Professor of New Testament Studies. Since 2014 he has been Extraordinary Associate Professor of Theology at North-West University.

== Academic career ==
Licona's book The Resurrection of Jesus: A New Historiographical Approach seeks to prove Jesus's bodily resurrection, and was praised by fellow evangelicals for "the painstaking care" with which Licona researched his topic.

Licona’s book Why are there Differences in the Gospels? What we can Learn from Ancient Biography seeks to describe the differences between the gospels in terms of the compositional practices of Greco-Roman biographies, arguing against both strained harmonizations and dismissals of the gospels’ historical reliability. He received the support of classical scholars John Ramsey, Christopher Pelling, Rainer Hirsch-Luipold, and Steven L. Jones.

Licona has often debated Bart D. Ehrman over his positions about Jesus and his resurrection. Despite this, the two are personal friends, and Licona has published guest articles on Ehrman's blog.

== Reception ==
Eve-Marie Becker praised Licona’s book Why are there Differences in the Gospels? What We Can Learn from Ancient Biography for its approach to the pattern of similarities and differences in the gospels and his analysis of the gospels in light of Greco-Roman literature, though she notes that the gospels could plausibly be historiographical rather than biographies, as Licona assumes.

== Controversy ==
In a passage in The Resurrection of Jesus, Licona questioned the literal interpretation of the story of the resurrection of the saints in Matthew 27, suggesting the possibility that it might be apocalyptic imagery. Licona resigned from his position as research professor at Southern Evangelical Seminary and as apologetics coordinator for the North American Mission Board (NAMB) as a result of the controversy surrounding his book The Resurrection of Jesus: A New Historiographical Approach, which was otherwise well received. This led to Norman Geisler and Albert Mohler accusing Licona of denying Biblical inerrancy. While asserting the divine authority of the Bible and its inerrancy, Licona maintained that he could not presuppose these beliefs while engaged in historical research and objected to Geisler’s arguments for inerrancy.

Other evangelical scholars such as William Lane Craig, J.P. Moreland, and Gary Habermas voiced their support for Licona by signing an open letter to Geisler. Michael F. Bird likewise supported Licona. The Southeastern Theological Review devoted their Summer 2012 issue to discussions on Licona's book (edited by Heath Thomas and Robert Stewart), including reviews by Gary Habermas, Timothy McGrew, and C. Behan McCullagh. It also included a virtual roundtable discussion with participants Heath Thomas, Michael Licona, Craig Blomberg, Paul Copan, Charles Quarles, Michael Kruger and Daniel Akin.

== Works ==
=== Thesis ===
- ——— (2008). The Historicity of the Resurrection of Jesus: historiographical considerations in the light of recent debates (Ph.D.). Pretoria, SA: University of Pretoria.

=== Books ===
- ——— (1998). Behold, I Stand At the Door and Knock: What to Say to Mormons and Jehovah's Witnesses When They Knock on Your Door. Truth Quest Publishers. ASIN B00126UFDS.
- ———; Habermas, Gary R. (2004). The Case for the Resurrection of Jesus. Grand Rapids, MI: Kregel. ISBN 978-0-8254-2788-6. OCLC 123818389.
- ——— (2006). Paul Meets Muhammad: A Christian-Muslim Debate on the Resurrection. Grand Rapids, MI: Baker Academic. ISBN 978-0-8010-6602-3.
- ——— (2010). The Resurrection of Jesus: A New Historiographical Approach. Downer's Grove, IL: IVP Academic. ISBN 978-0-8308-2719-0.
- Licona, Michael R. (2017). Why Are There Differences in the Gospels? What We Can Learn From Ancient Biography. Oxford, UK: Oxford University Press. ISBN 9780190264260.
- Licona, Michael R. (2020). Raised on the Third Day: Defending the Historicity of the Resurrection of Jesus. Bellingham, US: Lexham Press. ISBN 9781683594321.
- Licona, Michael R. (2024). Jesus, Contradicted: Why the Gospels Tell the Same Story Differently. Zondervan Academic. ISBN 9780310159599.

=== As editor ===
- ———; Dembski, William, eds. (2010). Evidence for God: 50 Arguments for Faith from the Bible, History, Philosophy & Science. Grand Rapids, MI: Baker Academic. ISBN 978-0-8010-7260-4.

=== Articles and chapters ===
- ——— (2009). "Historians and miracles: the principle of analogy and antecedent probability reconsidered". HTS Teologiese Studies / Theological Studies. 65 (1): 6. doi:10.4102/hts.v65i1.129. hdl:2263/11088. S2CID 145496185.
- ——— (2009). "The adjudication of miracles: Rethinking the criteria of historicity". HTS Teologiese Studies / Theological Studies. 65 (1): 7. doi:10.4102/hts.v65i1.130. hdl:2263/11099. S2CID 54900116.
- ——— (2014). "Historians and Miracle Claims". Journal for the Study of the Historical Jesus. 12 (1–2): 106–129. doi:10.1163/17455197-01202002. S2CID 54694524.
- ——— (2019). "Are the Gospels "Historically Reliable"? A Focused Comparison of Suetonius's Life of Augustus and the Gospel of Mark". Religions. 10 (3): 148. doi:10.3390/rel10030148. S2CID 150829429.
