= Veritas Forum =

Organization

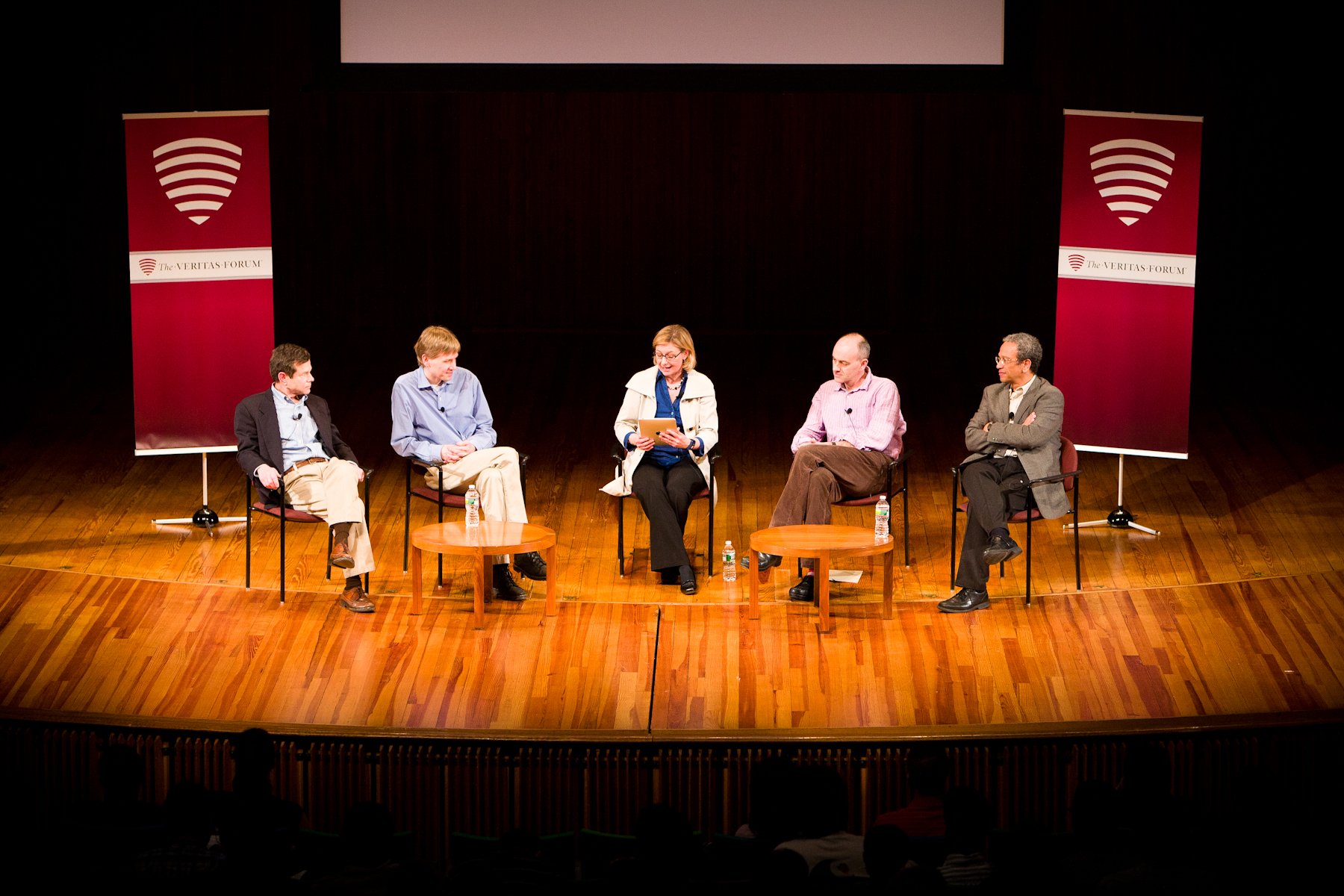
MIT professors Alan Lightman, Troy Van Voorhis, Alex Byrne, and Daniel Hastings speak on "Life, the Universe, and MIT" in a discussion moderated by Rosalind Picard.

The Veritas Forum is a non-profit organization that works with Christian students on college campuses to host forums centered on the exploration of truth and its relevancy in human life, through the questions of philosophy, religion, science, and other disciplines. The organization, named after the Latin word for truth, aims to "create university events engaging students and faculty in exploring life's hardest questions and the relevance of Jesus Christ to all of life." The first Veritas Forum was held at Harvard University in 1992. By 2008, 300,000 students had attended over 300 forums at 100 campuses across the US, Canada, France, England, and the Netherlands. In the 2010–2011 academic year, Veritas Forums were held at over 50 institutions of higher education. Veritas Forums are available for viewing online, and the organization has published several books with InterVarsity Press.

== Forums ==
To plan a Forum, Veritas partners with Christian student groups, who organize and host the Forum, typically co-sponsored by other student organizations and academic departments. Typical events include evening keynote addresses, workshops, debates, and discussions. Common topics include the existence of God; the relationship between science and religion; social justice work; questions of social ethics; feminism and women's issues; questions of meaning or purpose in human life, evil, or beauty; human sexuality and relationships; the existence of objective truth; religion and art; Christianity and popular culture; and the historical validity of the Bible.

Kelly Monroe Kullberg founded the organization, The Veritas Forum, but has not had any affiliation with it since 2016.

The Veritas Forum has hosted several discussion events with prominent speakers representing secular or non-Christian points of view, including Peter Singer, Steven Pinker, Antony Flew, Christopher Hitchens, Shelly Kagan, Alan Lightman, and Jeffrey Sachs.

Recent discussion events include the following: the 2009 Veritas Forum at MIT with atheist philosopher Peter Singer, Christian philosophical theologian John E. Hare, and philosopher and religious scholar Eric Gregory; the 2010 Veritas Forum in the Sheldonian Theatre of the University of Oxford, with atheist and journalist Christopher Hitchens alongside Catholic philosopher and ethicist John Joseph Haldane; and the 2010 Veritas Forum at UCLA with Christian mathematician and apologist John Lennox being interviewed by UCLA Law Professor Daniel Lowenstein.

== History ==
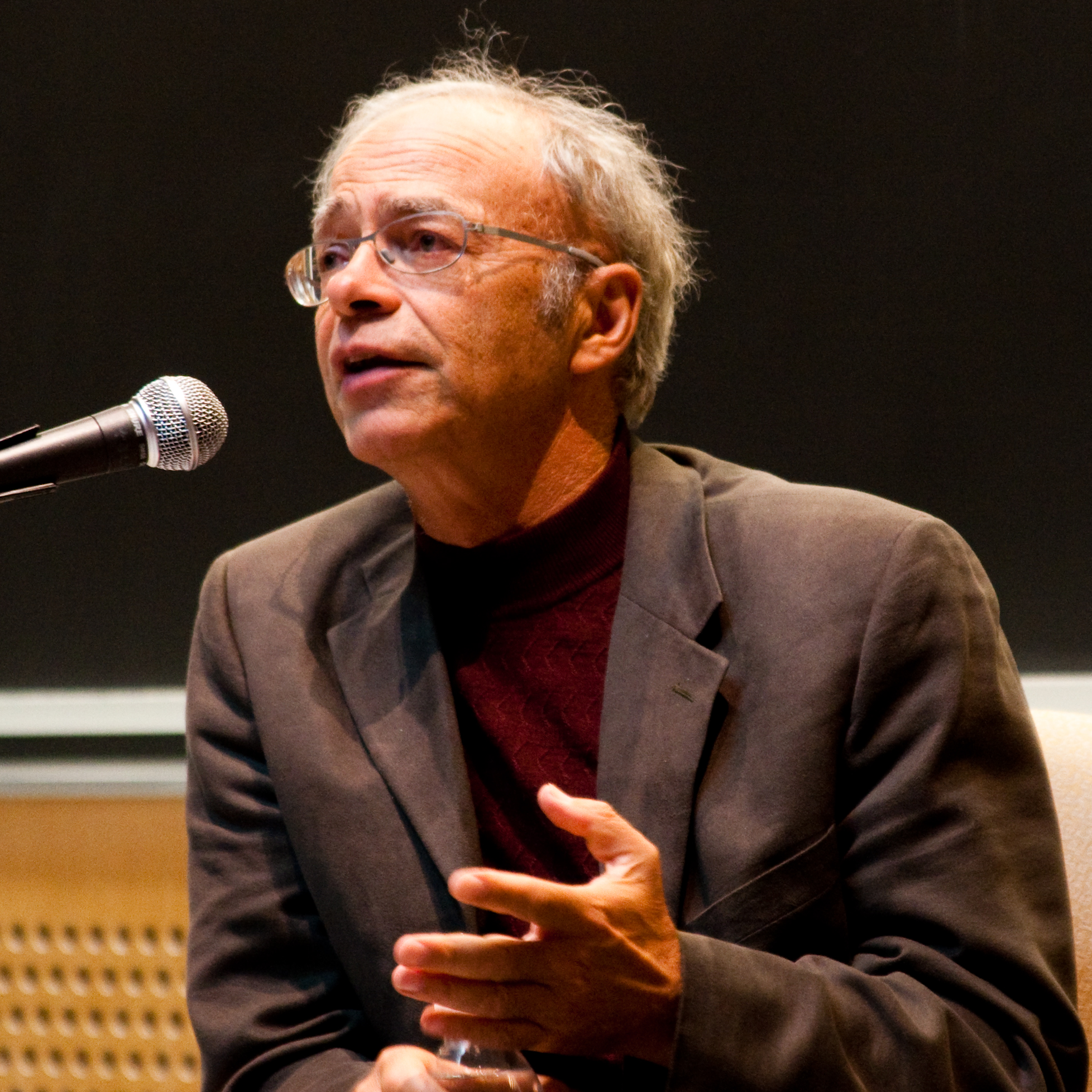
Peter Singer addresses a Veritas Forum at MIT about human worth and dignity.

The first forum took place at Harvard University in 1986, and was organized as an academic conference in Christian apologetics. Peter Gomes, Harvard's campus minister, participated in the forum in 1986. The Forum's name derives from Harvard's motto, Veritas, meaning Truth. Harvard's motto reflects the school's Christian heritage: although it is popularly trimmed to the one word Veritas, it officially reads "Veritas Christo et Ecclesiae," or Truth for Christ and the Church. With this name, Veritas seeks to remind the university community of the centrality of Christ to its founding. At the first Veritas Forum writers of the book Finding God at Harvard gathered to share their own questions, sufferings, journeys, and discoveries with the Harvard community.

After its first forum at Harvard, Veritas Forums spread to the University of Michigan, Ohio State, the University of Virginia, Yale and eventually across the country to Berkeley, Stanford, UC Davis, and UCLA.

France had its first Veritas Forum in 2006; England and the Netherlands in 2007; Macedonia in 2010. In the academic year 2010-2011, Forums were held at over forty American institutions of higher education. To date, over 400 speakers have presented at a Veritas event, representing a variety of disciplines and worldviews.

== Past speakers ==
=== Christian speakers ===
- Denis Alexander - Director of the Faraday Institute for Science and Religion at St Edmund's College, Cambridge
- Justin L. Barrett - psychologist and member of the Thrive Center for Human Development
- Jeremy Begbie - scholar of Christianity and the arts at Duke Divinity School
- Craig Blomberg - American New Testament scholar at Denver Seminary
- Mia Chung - pianist, and professor of Interpretive Analysis at Curtis Institute of Music
- Francis Collins - American physicist-geneticist, former head of the Human Genome Project
- Caroline Cox - member of the British House of Lords and CEO of the Humanitarian Aid Relief Trust
- William Lane Craig - American apologist, theologian, analytic philosopher and professor at Talbot School of Theology
- Marla Frederick - professor of African-American Studies and the Study of Religion at Harvard University
- Robert P. George - professor of jurisprudence at Princeton University
- Owen Gingerich - professor of astronomy and the history of science at Harvard University
- Os Guinness - noted author and apologist
- Gary Habermas - American philosopher of religion
- William Hurlbut - physician and consulting professor in the Neuroscience Institute at Stanford University
- Ian Hutchinson - nuclear physicist at the Massachusetts Institute of Technology
- Timothy Keller - Christian pastor in New York City and author of Reason for God
- Peter Kreeft - professor of philosophy at Boston College
- Madeleine L'Engle - American author of A Wrinkle in Time
- Michael Licona - American apologist, historian and New Testament scholar
- John Lennox - Irish apologist, mathematician and philosopher of science
- Ard Louis - reader of theoretical physics at Oxford University
- Paul L. Maier - American historian and writer
- George Marsden - historian and professor at the University of Notre Dame
- Frederica Mathewes-Green - Eastern Orthodox author and speaker on religion
- Alister McGrath - Anglican priest, theologian, professor at King's College London
- Kenneth R. Miller - American professor of biology and author of "Finding Darwin's God"
- J.P. Moreland - American philosopher, theologian, and apologist
- Richard John Neuhaus - prominent Christian cleric, founder and editor of "First Things"
- Rosalind Picard - professor of media arts and sciences at MIT, director of the Affective Computing Research Group at the MIT Media Lab
- Alvin Plantinga - American analytic philosopher and former professor at the University of Notre Dame
- John Polkinghorne - English theoretical physicist, Anglican priest, and professor at Cambridge University
- Mary Poplin - professor of education at Claremont Graduate University
- Vinoth Ramachandra - Sri Lankan Christian theologian and Secretary for Dialogue and Social Engagement for the International Fellowship of Evangelical Students
- Hugh Ross - Canadian astrophysicist and Christian apologist
- Fritz Schaefer - computational and theoretical chemist, professor at the University of Georgia
- John Stott - English Christian leader and Anglican cleric, principal author of the Lausanne Covenant
- S. Joshua Swamidass -American scientist in computational biology, professor at Washington University in St. Louis
- Peter Thiel - American investor and venture capitalist
- Troy Van Voorhis - MIT chemistry professor
- Miroslav Volf - Croatian professor of Christian theology at Yale University
- John H. Walton, theologian and Old Testament scholar at Wheaton College
- Dallas Willard - American philosopher, formerly a professor at the University of Southern California
- Peter J. Williams - British Bible scholar and lecturer
- Lauren Winner - author and lecturer, professor at Duke Divinity School
- Jennifer Wiseman - American astronomer at NASA Goddard Space Flight Center
- Nicholas Wolterstorff - philosopher at Yale University
- N.T. Wright - noted scholar and professor at the University of St. Andrews

=== Non-Christian speakers ===
- Colin Adams - mathematician, author, and professor at Williams College
- Dan Barker - American atheist and former Christian preacher
- Akeel Bilgrami - Indian-born philosopher of language and mind
- Sean M. Carroll - American physicist and theoretical cosmologist
- Veena Das - professor of anthropology at Johns Hopkins University
- David Eisenbach - historian and professor at Columbia University
- Antony Flew - British philosopher of religion and former atheist
- Marcelo Gleiser - Brazilian physicist at Dartmouth College, astronomer, and author of A Tear at the Edge of Creation
- Garrett Hardin - American ecologist, coiner of the phrase "tragedy of the commons," professor at University of California at Santa Barbara
- David Helfand - chair of the Astronomy department at Columbia University
- Christopher Hitchens - British author, journalist, and advocate of atheism
- Donald Hubin - professor of philosophy at Ohio State University
- Shelly Kagan - professor of philosophy at Yale University
- Nicholas D. Kristof - American journalist and winner of two Pulitzer prizes
- Alan Lightman - MIT professor and author of Einstein's Dreams
- Gerd Lüdemann - German critical New Testament scholar and atheist
- Steven Pinker - Harvard University professor of psychology and atheist
- Jeffrey Sachs - American economist, Director of the Earth Institute at Columbia University
- Scott Sehon - professor of philosophy at Bowdoin College
- Peter Singer - Australian philosopher, professor of bioethics at Princeton University, and hedonistic utilitarian

== Books and media ==
Veritas Forum recordings are freely available on the Veritas website.

Veritas Forum Books seek to provide "academically engaging, culturally relevant and distinctively Christian points of view" to the public. Current titles include the following:

- A Place for Truth edited by Dallas Willard, published in the fall of 2010
- The Dawkins Delusion by Alister McGrath and Joanna Collicutt McGrath
- Finding Calcutta by Mary Poplin
- Did the Resurrection Happen? featuring a discussion between Gary Habermas and Antony Flew
