= Veritas International University =

Evangelical Christian University

Coordinates: 33°42′00″N 117°54′40″W

Veritas International University (VIU) is a non-profit accredited Christian university in Albuquerque, New Mexico. Founded in 2008, the university began as a seminary before transitioning to a university with the addition of undergraduate and post-graduate degrees. The university now offers doctoral degrees as well.

== History ==
Veritas International University was established by Norman Geisler and Joseph Holden in Early 2008 as Veritas Evangelical Seminary in Santa Ana, California. The founders envisioned a school which would become like Southern Evangelical Seminary for the western U.S. Beginning with the objective to introduce Christian leaders into classical Christian apologetics, the seminary expanded degree programs, including archaeology, Biblical History, Education, and Theology.

The first classes were held at Calvary Chapel Bible College while it was based in Murrieta Hot Springs prior to a main campus being established in Santa Ana.

Veritas International University was accredited by the Transnational Association of Christian Colleges and Schools (TRACS) in 2014, and is recognized by the United States Department of Education.

The name change to Veritas International University was approved in late 2017, and implemented in January 2018.

== Academics ==
Veritas International University has nine degree programs, held within three schools: Veritas College & Seminary, VIU School of Archaeology, and the VIU Norman L. Geisler School of Apologetics. Each school is part of the university, emphasizing their respective areas of study that includes Christian studies, Biblical studies, Theological studies, Near Eastern archaeology and history, apologetics, missions, and pastoral studies.

The Best Schools and Colleges ranked Veritas International University's graduate program in Christian apologetics as the sixth best in the United States.

Government grants of $96,732 constituted 20% of the institution's total revenue for 2023. The chairman of the school's board of directors is vaccine developer Dr. Luman Wing.

== Doctrinal stance ==
Veritas International University has an evangelical doctrinal statement that emphasizes "three legs" of biblical authority: inspiration, infallibility, and biblical inerrancy. In addition to its approach to biblical studies, Veritas maintains a focus on classical theology, apologetics, and Thomistic philosophy.

== Campus ==
Veritas International University's main campus is based in Albuquerque, New Mexico. The university has additionally begun more distance learning programs.

== Notable Current and Former Faculty ==
- Scott Stripling, Historian & Director of Excavations for the Associates for Biblical Research at ancient Shiloh
- Steven Collins, author and archaeologist
- Norman Geisler, author, theologian
- Skip Heitzig, pastor and author
- Joseph Holden, Current President & Co-Founder. Additionally serves as Senior Pastor of Calvary Chapel Temecula Valley and Adjunct Faculty at Calvary Chapel Bible College
- Daniel Janosik, Islamic Expert
