= Chicago Statement =

Chicago Statement may refer to:

- Chicago Principles: freedom of expression on college campuses in the United States

or some late twentieth century Protestant theological considerations:

- Chicago Statement on Biblical Inerrancy
- Chicago Statement on Biblical Hermeneutics
- Chicago Statement on Biblical Application
