= William Tyndale College =

Private non-denominational Christian college located in Michigan, United States

Coordinates: 42°29′56″N 83°24′4″W

- Former names: Detroit Bible Institute; Detroit Bible College
- Motto: The Will of God: Nothing More, Nothing Less, Nothing Else
- Type: Private college
- Active: 1945–2005
- Religious affiliation: Nondenominational Christianity
- Location: Farmington Hills, Michigan, United States
- Campus: Suburban
- Nickname: Lancers

William Tyndale College was a private Christian college located in Farmington Hills, Michigan, United States. Named after 16th-century Protestant scholar William Tyndale, the college was founded as the Detroit Bible Institute in 1945, and became accredited by the American Association of Bible Colleges in 1954 and the North Central Association of Colleges and Schools in 1988. William Tyndale College closed on December 31, 2004. Its motto was In essentials, unity; in non-essentials, liberty; and in all things, charity.

== History ==
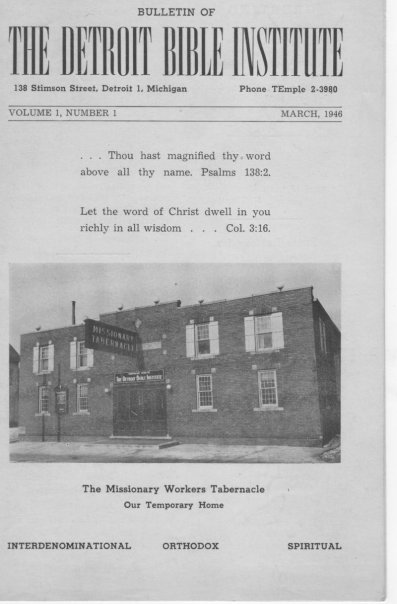
First Bulletin of Detroit Bible Institute 1946

The college opened its doors in September 1945 as the Detroit Bible Institute, organized by the Christian Business Men's Committee of Detroit. Classes were held in the Missionary Workers Tabernacle and later at Highland Park Baptist Church and Elim Baptist Church until the first campus was built at 17370 Meyers Road in northwest Detroit in 1950. The institute became a bachelor's-degree-granting college in 1960. In 1976, the college sold its Meyers Road campus to Lewis College of Business and moved to a temporary location in a former elementary school on Franklin Road in Southfield. DBC relocated to newly built facilities on a 28-acre campus at 35700 W. Twelve Mile Road in Farmington Hills, Michigan, in 1978. As a means of maintaining its historic connection with urban churches in Detroit following its move to suburban Oakland County, the college began offering undergraduate courses in Urban Ministry as well as non-credit continuing education courses at Greater New Mt. Moriah Baptist Church. In 1981 Detroit Bible College changed its name to William Tyndale College. In 1993 the continuing education component became Tyndale Bible Institute, offering a Bible Base Curriculum, in eight Metro-Detroit churches.

During the years from 1945 to 1980 when it was Detroit Bible Institute and then Detroit Bible College, the school's motto was "The will of God, nothing more, nothing less, nothing else." Numerous students graduated and went on to become pastors, missionaries and Christian teachers. The Detroit Bible College Chorale, a student vocal music group, toured the great lakes area every Easter vacation, presenting Scriptures and choral music to churches in that region.

Tyndale offered the Bachelor of Theology (Th.B.), Bachelor of Arts (B.A.), Bachelor of Religious Education (B.R.Ed.) Bachelor of Music (B.Mus.) and Associate of Arts (A.A.) degrees.

Five presidents led the college: Dr. Roy L. Aldrich, Dr. Wendell G. Johnston, Dr. William A. Shoemaker, Dr. James C. McHann, and Dr. Robert Hagerty. Notable faculty who served over the years include Dr. Charles H. Shaw, Dr. Herbert Cocking, Dr. Matthew Parker, and Dr. Henry W. Holloman.

== Theological connections ==
Although the college was not affiliated with a particular denomination, its early theological identity was tied to the dispensationalism theology that was characteristic of similar mid-20th-century Bible institutions, such as Dallas Theological Seminary, Moody Bible Institute and Philadelphia College of Bible. Through the early 1980s, the first two presidents and many of the college's administrators and Bible faculty were graduates of Dallas Seminary. Nonetheless, the student body represented a cross-section of conservative Protestant and independent churches, such as various Baptist groups, Assembly of God, Plymouth Brethren, Evangelical Presbyterian, Church of God in Christ, Bible churches, Trinitarian Pentecostal churches, and others. With the appointment of William Shoemaker as president in the mid-1980s, the college began to broaden its theological teaching perspective, a process that was met with mixed reaction from alumni and traditional constituents.

== Closure ==
In 2001, Congressman Joe Knollenberg worked with Tyndale's President James C. McHann to secure almost $1.5 million in federal funding for the college. In that same year, United States Senator Debbie Stabenow and Sen. Carl Levin also helped the college receive federal funding totaling $461,000. Prior to its closing, Tyndale was held afloat financially by Regent University for a short time, beginning in 2003.

In 2001, former President McHann and former Vice President W. Howard Burkeen and other school officials acquired a branch of Computer Learning Centers, Inc. and renamed it the NorthStar Institute of Technology. In November 2001, the school was raided under charges that NorthStar improperly provided federal aid to their students through Tyndale. At the conclusion of the case in 2005, Burkeen was ordered to repay the U.S. Department of Education over $300,000. McHann was acquitted of all charges.

== Notable alumni ==
- Norman Geisler, Christian apologetic and former president of the Southern Evangelical Seminary, received a degree from Detroit Bible College in 1955.
- Gary Habermas, Christian apologetic and professor at Liberty University, received a degree from DBC in 1972.
- Ed Hindson, dean of the Liberty University School of Divinity, received a bachelor's degree from Detroit Bible College.
- Dieumème Noelliste, professor of theological ethics and director of the Grounds Institute for Public Ethics, Denver Seminary received a ThB from William Tyndale College.
- Gilbert E. Patterson (1939–2007), late presiding bishop and chief apostle of the Church of God in Christ (COGIC), attended the Detroit Bible Institute.
- William L. Rowe, professor emeritus of philosophy at Purdue University, attended Detroit Bible Institute.
- Jack Van Impe, televangelist, received a diploma from Detroit Bible Institute in 1952.
