= Troy Van Voorhis =

American chemist

Troy A. Van Voorhis
- Born: January 22, 1976 (age 50)
- Education: Rice University; University of California, Berkeley
- Scientific career
- Institutions: MIT
- Doctoral advisor: Martin Head-Gordon
- Other academic advisors: Gustavo Scuseria; Eric J. Heller; David R. Reichman
- Website: vanvoorhisgroup.mit.edu

Troy A. Van Voorhis (born 1976) is an American chemist. He is currently the Haslam and Dewey Professor of Chemistry at Massachusetts Institute of Technology.

== Early life and education ==
Troy Van Voorhis graduated from North Central High School, Indianapolis, Indiana, in 1994. He graduated with a B.A. from Rice University in 1997. While at Rice, Van Voorhis conducted research under Gus Scuseria, notably developing the first practical implementation of a Meta-GGA in density functional theory (DFT). He went on to pursue a Ph.D. in theoretical chemistry under Martin Head-Gordon at the University of California, Berkeley, graduating in 2001. He went on to Harvard University for postdoctoral research with Eric J. Heller and David R. Reichman. In 2003, he joined the department of chemistry at MIT as a faculty member and was promoted to full professor in 2012. Since 2019, he has been the head of the department of chemistry at MIT.

Besides scientific research, he has made numerous videos with the Veritas Forum, in which he discusses his belief that science and religion are not in conflict.
