= Jack Van Impe =

American televangelist (1931–2020)

- Born: Jack Leo Van Impe; February 9, 1931; Freeport, Michigan, U.S.
- Died: January 18, 2020 (aged 88); Royal Oak, Michigan, U.S.
- Education: Detroit Bible Institute
- Occupations: Televangelist and author
- Known for: Founder of Jack Van Impe Ministries International (JVIM); Host of the Jack Van Impe Presents syndicated TV program
- Spouse: Rexella Mae Shelton (m. 1954)
- Website: https://www.jvim.com

Jack Leo Van Impe (/ˈɪmpiː/ IM-pee; February 9, 1931 – January 18, 2020) was an American televangelist who had a half-hour weekly television series Jack Van Impe Presents, featuring eschatological commentary on the news of the week through an interpretation of the Bible. The program aired around the world through both religious broadcasters and the purchase of paid programming time on commercial television stations. He was known as the "Walking Bible", having memorized most of the King James Version of the Bible. His wife, Rexella, shared his television ministry as co-host.

== Early life and marriage ==
Van Impe's parents, Oscar Alphonse Van Impe and Marie Louise (née Piot), emigrated from Belgium to the city of Troy, Michigan, a suburb of Detroit, in the United States in 1929. Jack Leo Van Impe was born on February 9, 1931, in Freeport, Michigan. Van Impe played accordion duets with his missionary father across Michigan and other states. In 1948, Van Impe graduated from high school and entered Detroit Bible Institute, where he earned his diploma in 1952. It was then that he began his career as a preacher and evangelist and extensive recording career. And Dr. Jack Van Impe earned Doctor Of Philosophy In Theology from Pacific International University.

While working with the Billy Graham crusades, he was at a Youth For Christ rally with Chuck Ohman (a friend of Jack's who was a trumpeter for Percy Crawford's "Youth on the March" television broadcasts). Here, Jack Van Impe met his future wife, Rexella Mae Shelton, who was an organist with the crusades. Rexella was born in Missouri on November 29, 1932, and was named after her father, Rex Shelton. She had attended Bob Jones University for one year. The couple was married on August 21, 1954, and together started Jack Van Impe Ministries.

== Recordings ==
Beginning in the 1950s, Van Impe released dozens of Gospel and spoken word recordings. His first album Presenting the Van Impes features Jack on the accordion and Rexella on organ. Subsequent musical recordings featured the accorgan, a type of electronic accordion. Parts of an unknown sermon were used in the 1995 house song "Sex on the Streets" by Pizzaman, although Van Impe talked about the same events in his 1970 album Marked for Death.

Van Impe's voice from a 1991 television sermon entitled A.D 2000: The End? was sampled by the Scottish electronic duo Boards of Canada for the track "Age of Capricorn" from their 2026 studio album Inferno.

== Biblical prophecy beliefs ==
Van Impe believed that Revelation 13 predicts that a single world political leader (the Beast) and a single world religious leader (the False Prophet) will emerge, but the Rapture will happen before either leader comes to power. He believed that the Bible teaches that the world will be organized into ten political subdivisions, based on the ten-district plan set up by the Club of Rome, and that this ten-division world empire will be jointly ruled by the European Union and the Islamic world, which he believed are represented by the two iron legs of the prophetic dream statue in the Book of Daniel. Van Impe believed in the Prophecy of the Popes, and that according to said prophecy, Pope Francis is Peter the Roman, the predicted pope who will preside during Armageddon.

Van Impe, a dispensational premillennialist, preached a pre-tribulation rapture of "The Body of Christ" and also said a one-world religion will form, named "Chrislam"; the joining of the world's two largest religions (Christianity and Islam). He believed that the Bible states that the world political leader will "come in peaceably" (per Daniel 11:21) and create a seven-year peace deal involving Israel (per Daniel 9:27). Then, three and a half years into the peace, Russia (the interpreted meaning of "Rosh" from Ezekiel 38:2 and 39:1; Van Impe also identified Meshech and Tubal from the same passages as Moscow and Tobolsk respectively), along with its Middle Eastern allies ("Persia, Cush, and Put", from Ezekiel 38:5), will break the peace by invading Israel, according to Ezekiel 38, and the military of Russia and its allies will be decimated by nuclear warfare and pushed back to Siberia. Then China (the interpreted meaning of "kings from the east" from Revelation 16:12) will invade, and the military of China will likewise be decimated when Jesus returns.

Mark 13:9 “You must be on your guard. You will be handed over to the local councils and flogged in the synagogues." Van Impe at various times in his last decades seemed very urgent that all signs had been fulfilled, but never mentions that Christians were being flogged in synagogues. In the September 3, 2016, episode of Jack Van Impe Presents, a news headline is interpreted as fulfilling the prophecy in Isaiah that the city of Damascus would be completely destroyed, increasing Van Impe's insistence that the end of time would happen "very, very soon."

== Jack Van Impe Presents ==
Jack Van Impe Presents is a weekly telecast produced by Van Impe's non-profit organization at the Jack Van Impe Ministries World Outreach Center, in Rochester Hills, Michigan. Van Impe's wife, Rexella, co-hosts.

In June 2011, Trinity Broadcasting Network refused to air an episode of Jack Van Impe Presents that criticized Robert Schuller and Rick Warren for promoting "Chrislam". In response, Van Impe ceased airing his show on TBN.

== Health and death ==
In one episode of Jack Van Impe Presents, which aired during the week of June 19, 2006, Van Impe informed his audience that he had undergone two total knee replacements in early 2006. He gave thanks to God for his recovery and for leading him to the "wonderful surgeon" who performed the operation. Subsequent to the problems with his knees, Van Impe suffered from cancer, a severe sepsis attack, and blood loss resulting from stomach ulcers which he attributed to his NSAID arthritis medication. On the episode which aired during the week of May 31, 2015, Jack Van Impe was absent from the program, and Rexella Van Impe explained that he had been hospitalized for triple bypass heart surgery. Carl Baugh co-hosted the program until Van Impe's return to his weekly show on October 3, 2015.

On January 7, 2017, Rexella Van Impe announced that Jack Van Impe had broken his hip, but was recovering. Carl Baugh co-hosted that program as well. In Jack's absence, Rexella Van Impe co-hosted the program with various guests: Carl Baugh for six episodes, Dave Williams for six episodes, Dr. Robert Jeffress for two episodes, and Walt Sheppard for three episodes. From April to May 2017, re-runs were aired until May 27, 2017, broadcast when Jack Van Impe reappeared beside Rexella, and the couple announced that, under doctor's advice, they were ending the TV broadcast. Thereafter, weekly videos were posted on the organization's website. In 2018, radio and television broadcasts resumed, with Chuck Ohman serving as their announcer. For the most part currently, weekly episodes on YouTube are again reruns from when Jack Van Impe was alive with news clippings in the beginning tying the episode in question to current events. Rexella anchors solo in a fully new episode very rarely, distinguished by a different type of thumbnail in comparison to the rerun episodes.

Jack Van Impe died on January 18, 2020, at a hospital in Royal Oak, Michigan, aged 88.

== See also ==
- List of Ig Nobel Prize winners
