= Alex McFarland =

American public speaker and author

Alex McFarland is an American public speaker, author, educator, and advocate for Christian apologetics. In the Alex McFarland Speaker Series, Alex McFarland hosted Charlie Kirk (just weeks before Charlie's assassination) on August 21, 2025. Alex McFarland also co-hosts "Exploring the Word" on the American Family Radio Network, airing daily on nearly 200 radio stations across the U.S. His TV program, the “Alex McFarland Show,” airs weekly on NRB TV and YouTube. The “Alex McFarland Show” podcast is available at alexmcfarland.com/podcasts or wherever you listen to podcasts.

McFarland was President of the Southern Evangelical Seminary from 2006 - 2011. Later, he served as director of the Center for Christian Worldview and Apologetics at North Greenville University.

McFarland is a speaker for evangelical Christian audiences.

== Childhood and education ==
Alex McFarland was born and raised in North Carolina where he attended the University of North Carolina at Greensboro. He later completed a master's degree from Liberty University in Lynchburg, Virginia in Christian Thought and Apologetics. In 2017 he returned as the university's Convocation speaker.

He lives in North Carolina with his wife.

== Career ==
McFarland's 2000 Tour of Truth saw him preach the Gospel in all 50 states in 50 days. Hawaii was the first stop in a 17,000-mile tour during which McFarland preached in one church in each of the fifty states. McFarland and his wife traveled in an RV accompanied by three college students working as interns, and a married couple who did the driving. In Easley, South Carolina on day 32, a lightning strike fried the computer modem, and a German Shepherd bit McFarland's arm outside a Chase, Maryland church. He wrote his first book, 50 States in 50 Days: The "Tour of Truth" Story, and How 9 People Made the Journey of a Lifetime Across America.

McFarland later served at James Dobson's Focus on the Family as Director of Teen Apologetics based on Colorado Springs, Colorado. In 2006, he accepted the position as third president of Southern Evangelical Seminary in Charlotte, North Carolina where he served for nearly five years.

Since 2011, McFarland has served as Director of the Christian Worldview Center at North Greenville University in Greenville, South Carolina. In addition, he co-hosts a radio program called "Exploring the Word" on American Family Radio.

McFarland created the Truth for a New Generation apologetics conferences. He argues that the United States, especially on university campuses, has become hostile to Christian believers. In his 2017 book 2017 Abandoned Faith: Why Millennials Are Walking Away and How You Can Lead Them Home, McFarland and his co-author Jason Jimenez argue millennials drift away due to "the breakdown of the family," in America.

== Bibliography ==
- Abandoned Faith: Why Millennials Are Walking Away and How You Can Lead Them Homewith Jason Jimenez (Focus on the Family, 2017) ISBN 978-1589978829
- 10 Issues That Divide Christians
- 10 Answers for Atheists: How to Have an Intelligent Discussion About the Existence of God
- 10 Answers for Skeptics
- 10 Questions about Prayer Every Christian Must Answer: Thoughtful Responses about our Communication with God
- 10 Questions Every Christian Must Answer: Thoughtful Responses to Strengthen Your Faith (with Elmer Towns)
- 50 States In 50 Days: The "Tour of Truth" Story, and How 9 People Made the Journey of a Lifetime Across America
- Stand Strong: In College
- STAND: Core Truths You Must Know for an Unshakable Faith
- Stand: Seeking the Way of God: A Discovery of Genesis 37–47
- Stand: Diving into God's Words: A Discovery of Psalm 119
- The 10 Most Common Objections to Christianity
- The 21 Toughest Questions Your Kids Will Ask about Christianity: & How to Answer Them Confidently
- The Assault on America
- 100 Bible Questions and Answers
