= Norman Geisler =

American evangelical philosopher (1932–2019)

- Born: Norman Leo Geisler; July 21, 1932; Warren, Michigan, U.S.
- Died: July 1, 2019 (aged 86); Charlotte, North Carolina, U.S.

Education
- Education: Wheaton College (BA, MA); William Tyndale College (ThB); Loyola University Chicago (PhD)
- Thesis: Religious Transcendence: Some Criteria (1970)

Philosophical work
- Era: 20th-century philosophy
- Region: Western Philosophy
- School: Non-denominational Evangelical Christian, Amyraldism, Neo-Thomistic Philosophy, Premillennial-Dispensational, Free grace theology
- Institutions: Detroit Bible College; Dallas Theological Seminary; Southern Evangelical Seminary; Veritas International University; Trinity College; Trinity Evangelical Divinity School
- Main interests: Philosophy of religion, Christian apologetics, Systematic theology, Philosophy, Thomism/Neo-Thomism, Biblical inerrancy, Bible difficulties, Creationism versus Evolution, Calvinism-Arminianism, Roman Catholicism and Evangelicalism (differences and agreements), Christian Ethics
- Notable ideas: 12 point apologetic argument, Chicago Statement on Biblical Inerrancy, Chicago Statement on Biblical Hermeneutics

Norman Leo Geisler (July 21, 1932 – July 1, 2019) was an American Christian systematic theologian, philosopher, and apologist. He was the co-founder of two non-denominational evangelical seminaries (Veritas International University and Southern Evangelical Seminary).

Geisler held a Ph.D. in philosophy from Loyola University and made scholarly contributions to the subjects of classical Christian apologetics, systematic theology, the history of philosophy, philosophy of religion, Calvinism, Roman Catholicism, Biblical inerrancy, Bible difficulties, ethics, and more. He was the author, coauthor, or editor of over 90 books and hundreds of articles.

One of the primary architects of the Chicago Statement on Biblical Inerrancy, Geisler was well noted within the United States evangelical community for his stalwart defense of Biblical inerrancy.

== Biography ==
Norman Leo Geisler was born on July 21, 1932, in Warren, Michigan, a suburb of Detroit. He attended a nondenominational, evangelical church from age nine; and converted into Christianity at age of eighteen. He immediately began attempting to share his faith with others in various evangelistic endeavors—door-to-door, street meetings, jail services, rescue missions, and Youth for Christ venues.

Some of Geisler's conversations during this period forced him to realize he needed to find better answers to the objections he was hearing. He subsequently earned two bachelor's degrees, two master's degrees, and a Doctorate. These included a B.A. in philosophy (1958) and M.A. in theology from Wheaton College, a Th.B. (1964) from William Tyndale College, and a Ph.D. in philosophy from Loyola University. He had additional graduate work at Wayne State University, the University of Detroit, and Northwestern University in Evanston, Illinois. Throughout his life, Geisler also served in various pastoral roles in Michigan, Illinois, Texas, and North Carolina.

Geisler's decades of degree work overlapped a professorial and academic career begun at Detroit Bible College (1959–66) and continued at Trinity Evangelical Divinity School (1969–70), and Trinity College (1970–71). Beginning in 1970, he served as the Chairman of Philosophy of Religion at Trinity Evangelical Divinity School (1970–79), and later as Professor of Systematic Theology at Dallas Theological Seminary (1979–88).

Beginning in the 1970s, Geisler began engaging in formal public debates on various subjects, starting with a debate at the College of Lake County in 1973 with Milton J. Rosenberg on the question of God's existence. In 1974, Geisler debated Michael Scriven at the University of Calgary on the question "Is Christianity Credible?"

Geisler was a key figure in founding the Evangelical Philosophical Society, serving as its first President from 1976-77 as well as the first editor of its journal, which was then called the Bulletin of the Evangelical Philosophical Society.

From 1977-87, Geisler served as the General Editor and Director of Publications for the International Council on Biblical Inerrancy (ICBI), where he also served as the Member of the Drafting Committee. Geisler was the author of the official ICBI Commentary on the Chicago Statement on Biblical Hermeneutics. In 1981, Geisler debated Norman A. Beck on the issue of Biblical inerrancy.

In 1981, Geisler testified in "the Scopes II trial" (McLean v. Arkansas Board of Education). Duane Gish, a creationist, remarked: "Geisler was... the lead witness for the creationist side and one of its most brilliant witnesses. His testimony, in my view (I was present during the entire trial), effectively demolished the most important thrust of the case by the ACLU. Unfortunately, in my opinion, no testimony, and no effort by any team of lawyers, no matter how brilliant, could have won the case for the creationist side." From 1982-83, Geisler engaged in multiple debates regarding the Creation/Evolution controversy, including with Paul Edwards and Steven Schafersman.

In 1984, Geisler debated Harold Kushner on the John Ankerberg Show on the question "Why do Bad Things Happen to Good People?" He would return in 1986 to debate Paul Kurtz on the subject of Christianity versus secular humanism. In 1988, Geisler debated John B. Cobb on the topic of process vs. classical theism.

From 1989-91, Geisler served as the Dean of Liberty Center for Research and Scholarship at Liberty University. In 1992, Geisler co-founded Southern Evangelical Seminary & Bible College with Ross Rhoads in Charlotte, North Carolina. At its founding, Geisler was appointed as the first Dean of the seminary, a position he held until 1999, and which he would hold again from 2006-07. Geisler served as President of Southern Evangelical Seminary from 1999-2006. In 1994, Geisler engaged in his final public debate with Farrell Till on the question "Did Jesus Rise from the Dead?" In 1997, Geisler co-authored When Cultists Ask: A Popular Handbook on Cultic Misinterpretation. He contributed to The Counterfeit Gospel of Mormonism.

While acting as the Dean of Southern Evangelical, Geisler served as the President of the Evangelical Theological Society (ETS) in 1998, but left in 2003 after the Society did not expel Clark Pinnock, who had advocated in favor of open theism. Additionally, he was a co-founder and first president of the International Society of Christian Apologetics (ISCA), acting as the first President of the Society from 2006-08. In 1999, Geisler and his co-author and student Frank Turek won the Gold Medallion Award for their book Legislating Morality.

In 2008, Geisler co-founded the Veritas Evangelical Seminary (now Veritas International University) in Murrieta, California alongside Joseph M. Holden. Geisler served as Chancellor, Distinguished Professor of Apologetics and Theology, and occupant of the Norman L. Geisler Chair of Christian Apologetics. He retired from this post in May 2019. Before retiring from teaching and writing in 2019, Geisler served as the General Editor of Defending Inerrancy from 2014-19.

== Personal ==
Geisler was married to Barbara Jean Cate for 64 years, and together they had six children: Ruth, David, Daniel, Rhoda, Paul, and Rachel. He died of cerebral thrombosis at a hospital in Charlotte, North Carolina on July 1, 2019, 20 days before his 87th birthday. Geisler's funeral was held at Calvary Church in Charlotte, North Carolina. Ravi Zacharias gave the eulogy.

== Apologetics ==
Geisler is known first and foremost as a classical Christian apologist. Between 1970 and 1990 he participated in dozens of public debates and gained a reputation as a defender of theism, biblical miracles, the resurrection of Jesus, and the reliability of the Bible.

=== Outline of Geisler's Apologetic Method ===
The first attempt to publish an outline of his apologetic method showed up in an appendix of his 1990 book When Skeptics Ask. The appendix is titled "Reasoning to Christianity from Ground Zero" and presents a high-level view of the holistic system of classical apologetics Geisler had been developing over the years. The first outline contained fourteen points of argument:

1. There are self-evident truths (e.g., "I exist," "Logic applies to reality").
2. Truth corresponds to reality.
3. Truth is knowable (all other views are self-defeating).
4. One can proceed from self-evident truths to the existence of God.
  1. The argument from Creation (proceeds from "I exist")
  2. The argument from morals (proceeds from "Values are undeniable")
  3. The argument from design (proceeds from "Design implies a designer")
5. God is a necessary Being (argument from being).
6. My existence is not necessary (evident from the definition of a necessary Being).
7. Therefore, theism is true (there is a necessary Being beyond the world who has created the contingent things in the world and intervenes in the world).
  1. The objection from the problem of evil can be solved.
  2. The objection to miracles can be solved.
8. The Bible is a historically reliable document.
  1. History is an objective study of the past.
  2. There is great historical, archaeological, and scientific evidence to confirm the reliability of the Bible. (Corollary: The Bible gives a reliable record of the teaching of Jesus Christ.)
9. Jesus claimed to be both fully human and fully God.
10. He gave evidence to support this claim.
  1. The fulfillment of prophecy
  2. His miraculous and sinless life
  3. His resurrection
11. Therefore, Jesus is both fully human and fully God.
12. Whatever God teaches is true.
13. Jesus (God) taught that the Old Testament was the inspired Word of God and He promised the New Testament.
14. Therefore, both the Old and New Testaments are the inspired Word of God.

The overview of his system was later streamlined slightly into a 12-point schema. As of 1999, it could be summarized as follows:

1. Truth about reality is knowable.
2. Opposites cannot both be true (The Law of Noncontradiction).
3. It is true the theistic God exists.
4. If God exists, then miracles are possible.
5. Miracles performed in connection with a truth claim are acts of God to confirm the truth of God through a messenger of God.
6. The New Testament is historically reliable.
7. As witnessed in the New Testament, Jesus claimed to be God.
8. Jesus's claim to divinity was proven by miracles, especially the Resurrection.
9. Therefore, Jesus is God.
10. Because Jesus is God, whatever Jesus affirmed as true, is true.
11. Jesus affirmed that the Bible is the Word of God.
12. Therefore, it is true that the Bible is the Word of God and whatever is opposed to any biblical truth is false.

These same twelve steps served as the framework for the chapters of the highly popular book I Don't Have Enough Faith to be an Atheist (co-authored with Frank Turek and published in 2004), and in Geisler's 2012 book Twelve Points that Show Christianity is True.

=== Geisler's Philosophical Argument for the Existence of God (Theism) ===
As an evangelical Thomist, Norman Geisler contributed the following Thomistic argument for God's existence, which was described as "his own unique contribution to the cosmological class of argument for the existence of God," and which "he developed and refined over sixty years (1956 to 2015)."

==== The Argument Outlined in Seven Points ====
1. Something exists (e.g., I do).
2. Nothing cannot produce something.
3. Therefore, something exists eternally and necessarily.
4. It exists eternally because if ever there was absolutely nothing, then there would always be absolutely nothing because nothing cannot produce something.
5. It exists necessarily because everything cannot be a contingent being because all contingent beings need a cause of their existence.
6. I am not a necessary and eternal being (since I change).
7. Therefore, both God (a Necessary Being) and I (a contingent being) exist (= theism).

==== The Argument in Eighteen Points ====
The longer form of the argument, presented in eighteen points, is as follows:

1. Being is. That is, something exists.
2. Being is being. A thing is identical to itself.
3. Being is not non-being.
4. Either being or non-being. Something cannot both exist and not exist at the same time.
5. Non-being cannot cause being. Nothing cannot cause something.
6. A caused being is similar to its Cause.
7. A being is either necessary or contingent but not both.
8. A necessary being cannot cause another necessary being to come to be.
9. A contingent being cannot be the efficient cause of another contingent being.
10. A necessary being is a being of Pure Actuality with no potentiality.
11. A Being of Pure Actuality cannot cause another being with Pure Actuality to exist.
12. A being that is caused by a Being of Pure Actuality must have both actuality and potentiality.
13. Every being that is caused by a being of Pure Actuality must be both like and dislike its Cause.
14. I am a contingent being.
15. But only a necessary being can cause a contingent being to exist.
16. Therefore, a Necessary Being (of Pure Actuality) exists who caused me (and every other contingent being there may be) to exist.
17. This Necessary Being of Pure Actuality (with no potentiality) has certain necessary attributes:
  1. It cannot change (= is immutable)
  2. It cannot be temporal (= is eternal)
  3. It cannot be material (= immaterial)
  4. It cannot be finite (= infinite)
  5. It cannot be divided or divisible (= simple)
  6. It must be an uncaused being since it is a necessary being
  7. It must be only One being
  8. It must be infinitely knowing (= omniscient) Being
  9. It must be all-powerful (omnipotent) Being
  10. It must be an absolutely morally perfect Being
  11. It must be a personal Being
  12. This being is appropriately called "God."
18. Therefore, one infinite, uncaused, personal, morally perfect, all-knowing, all-powerful Being who caused all finite being(s) to exist exists. This is what is meant by a theistic God. Hence, a theistic God exists.

=== Geisler's Argument for Biblical Miracles ===
Geisler addressed the debate over biblical miracles in multiple works, including Miracles and the Modern Mind, Baker Encyclopedia of Christian Apologetics, and Twelve Points Which Show Christianity is True. In I Don't Have Enough Faith to Be An Atheist, Geisler and Frank Turek claim "since we know that God exists, miracles are possible. Any argument against miracles that can be concocted, including that of David Hume, is destroyed by that one fact. For if there is a God who can act, there can be acts of God (miracles)." This claim is reiterated in Geisler's work Miracles and the Modern Mind, where he claims "If a theistic God exists, then there is no reason to rule out the possibility of miracles."

Geisler argues in Miracles and the Modern Mind that miracles are possible, credible, rational, not unscientific, identifiable, not mythological, historical, not antinatural, distinguishable, and actual. Geisler further argues miracles are essential to Christianity and are definable. Concerning whether miracles are actual, Geisler makes the claim that "[t]he very cosmological argument, by which we know God exists, also proves that a supernatural event has occurred. For if the universe had a beginning and, therefore, a Beginner [...] then God brought the universe into existence out of nothing [...] But ex nihilo creation out of nothing is the greatest supernatural event of all. [...] So, the surprising conclusion is that, if the Creator exists, then the miraculous is not only possible but actual."

In Twelve Points That Show Christianity is True, Geisler presents the following criteria for a valid miracle which confirms a truth claim is genuinely from God:

1. The events must be truly supernatural.
2. There must be multiple miracles.
3. The miraculous events must be connected with some truth claim in the name of God.
4. The miraculous events must be unique.
5. A predictive element is helpful in confirming a divine claim.

In Miracles and the Modern Mind, Geisler takes the above criteria and presents the following argument:

1. Only Christianity has unique miracle claims confirmed by sufficient testimony.
2. What has unique miraculous confirmation of its claims is true (as opposed to contrary views).
3. Therefore, Christianity is true (as opposed to contrary views).

==== Criticism of C. S. Lewis ====
Geisler was a critic of C. S. Lewis' higher critical view of the miracles recorded in the Old Testament, claiming Lewis "[relegated] many Old Testament miracles to the realm of myth." In Is Man the Measure? Geisler provides C. S. Lewis' writings as an example of Christian humanism, in which Lewis' views on the Old Testament and its miracles are also subject to criticism.

== Theology ==
Geisler was an evangelical scholar who wrote a four-volume systematic theology, which was later condensed into a 1,660 page one-volume tome, and subsequently republished in four volumes in 2025.

=== Biblical Inerrancy ===
Geisler defended the full inerrancy of the Bible, being one of the co-founders and framers of the "Chicago Statement on Biblical Inerrancy" (1978) and editor of the book Inerrancy (Zondervan, 1978). His notoriety as a defender of the Bible started to grow after co-authoring (with William Nix) General Introduction to the Bible (Moody Press, 1968, 1986) and From God to Us, revised (Moody, 1974, 2012). He co-authored Defending Inerrancy with William Roach (Baker, 2013) and proceeded to start the blogsite Defending Inerrancy with William Roach and others. He wrote the foreword to the book Explaining Biblical Inerrancy, a compilation which includes the Chicago Statements on Biblical Inerrancy, Biblical Hermeneutics, and Biblical Application, the official ICBI commentary on the Statement on Biblical Inerrancy by R.C. Sproul, and the official ICBI commentary on the Statement on Biblical Hermeneutics authored by Geisler. The last book Geisler wrote on the subject was Preserving Orthodoxy, in which he explains how to "maintain continuity with the historic Christian faith on Scripture," and gives his perspective on the inerrancy-related controversies in which he had been engaged with Robert Gundry, Clark Pinnock, and Michael Licona.

=== Calvinism ===
Geisler considered himself a "moderate Calvinist", as expressed in his book Chosen but Free (Harvest House, 2001) and Systematic Theology, in One Volume (Harvest House, 2012). Geisler, in his book Chosen but Free, distinguishes his moderate Calvinism in many ways from more extreme views of Calvinism. he summarizes his view of the five points of Calvinism as follows:

| TULIP | Extreme Calvinism | Moderate Calvinism |
|---|---|---|
| Total depravity | Destructive | Corruptive |
| Unconditional Election | Unconditional for both man and God | Unconditional for God, conditional for man |
| Limited atonement | Limited to the elect | Limited in result, made for all men |
| Irresistible grace | Compulsive | Persuasive |
| Perseverance of the Saints | No saint will die in sin | No saint will be lost, even if he dies in sin |

This form of moderate Calvinism has been taught by multiple Dispensational Calvinists such as Lewis Sperry Chafer, John Walvoord and Charles Ryrie. Norman Geisler argued that his view of election strongly resembles that of Thomas Aquinas.

==== Election ====
Norman Geisler spoke of election being "in according with" God's foreknowledge instead of being "based on" his foreknowledge, and is additionally unconditional for God, but conditional for man. To explain how he understood his doctrine of election, Geisler used the illustration of a young man contemplating on potentially proposing to one of two ladies. The man chooses to propose to the first lady because he knew that she would respond to the action, while he does not propose to the second woman because he knew that she would not respond. Geisler thus believed that God effectually calls those whom he knows will respond to this call.

==== Perseverance of the Saints ====
Geisler also distinguished his view of the perseverance of the saints from the extreme Calvinist view. Geisler believed an elect person would not be lost even if they die in sin, and he strongly protested against the view that a person cannot be sure that he is one of the elect until he gets to heaven. Unlike some Calvinists, Geisler understood warnings in the New Testament such as that in Hebrews 10 as pertaining to a loss of eternal rewards, instead of speaking of false believers.

=== Dispensationalism ===
Norman Geisler believed in dispensational premillennialism, however he criticized progressive dispensationalism, ultradispensationalism and hyperdispensationalism. Contrary to progressive dispensationalism's rejection of the human author's meaning in biblical exegesis, Geisler affirmed that although God knows more about the topic and sees more implications in any given text, the text cannot mean more than the human author intended.

=== Other views ===
Geisler has been associated with the Free Grace movement alongside Lewis Sperry Chafer and Miles Stanford. Geisler articulated a moderate free grace view in his Systematic Theology, vol. 3, as opposed to what he described as the Lordship Salvation and extreme Free Grace positions. He also strongly advocated for the classical form of divine simplicity, arguing that God's attributes are identical to his essence.

== Philosophy ==
Geisler was a self-described evangelical Thomist as it pertained to his philosophical commitments. In the first volume of his Systematic Theology, Geisler affirms Thomism as superior to atomism, Platonism, and Aristotelianism as it pertains to their respective responses to the Parmenidean dilemma of the one and the many. Geisler further evaluated Thomism in light of evangelical Christianity as well as the compatibility between the two in his work, Thomas Aquinas: An Evangelical Appraisal.

When interviewed by Christianity Today in 2002, Geisler gave his evaluation of Thomas Aquinas, which was juxtaposed by Christianity Today against Ronald Nash's previous 1974 article wherein Nash described Aquinas as "unsuitable for a biblically centered Christian philosophy." Geisler also held that a consistent Thomist need not be a Roman Catholic, and that Thomism did not necessarily lead to Catholicism, a claim which Geisler's contemporaries, (such as R. C. Sproul), also held.

== Ethics ==
Geisler wrote two significant books on ethics: Christian Ethics and The Christian Love Ethic. He provided his perspective on ethical options, abortion, infanticide, euthanasia, biomedical issues, capital punishment, war, civil disobedience, sexual issues, homosexuality, marriage and divorce, ecology, animal rights, drugs, gambling, pornography, birth control, and more.

Of the six major ethical systems (antinomianism, situationalism, generalism, unqualified absolutism, conflicting absolutism, and graded absolutism), Geisler advocated graded absolutism, which is a theory of moral absolutism which affirms that in moral conflicts we are obligated to perform the higher moral duty. Moral absolutism is the ethical view that certain actions are absolutely right or wrong regardless of other contexts such as their consequences or the intentions behind them. Graded absolutism is moral absolutism but clarifies that a moral absolute, like "Do not kill", can be greater or lesser than another moral absolute, like "Do not lie". Graded absolutism is also called "contextual absolutism" but is not to be confused with situational ethics. The conflict is resolved in acting according to the greater absolute. That is why graded absolutism is also called the "greater good view", but is not to be confused with utilitarianism (see also prima facie right).

Geisler believed the American Revolution was not justified by the standards of either the Bible or just war theory. However, he was not a pacifist, believing that defensive wars are justified but revolutions are not.

== Works ==
The following is a list of books authored, co-authored or edited by Norman Geisler.

- A General Introduction to the Bible (Moody, 1968)
- Christ the Theme of the Bible (Moody, 1968 | Bastion Books, 2012)
- Ethics: Alternatives and Issues (Zondervan, 1971)
- The Christian Ethic of Love (Zondervan, 1973)
- Philosophy of Religion (Zondervan, 1974)
- From God to Us (Moody, 1974)
- To Understand the Bible Look for Jesus (1975, reprint and retitle of Christ: The Theme of the Bible)
- Christian Apologetics (Baker, 1976)
- A Popular Survey of the Old Testament (Baker, 1977)
- The Roots of Evil (Zondervan, 1978) (Second edition, Zondervan, 1981)
- Inerrancy (Zondervan, 1979)
- Introduction to Philosophy: A Christian Perspective (Baker, 1980)
- Options in Contemporary Christian Ethics (Baker, 1981)
- Biblical Errancy: Its Philosophical Roots (Zondervan, 1981 | Bastion Books, 2013)
- Decide for Yourself: How History Views the Bible (Zondervan, 1982)
- The Creator in the Courtroom “Scopes II “: The 1981 Arkansas Creation-Evolution Trial (Baker, 1982)
- What Augustine Says (Baker, 1982 | Bastion Books, 2013)
- Is Man the Measure? An Evaluation of Contemporary Humanism (Baker, 1983)
- Cosmos: Carl Sagan's Religion for the Scientific Mind (Quest, 1983)
- Religion of the Force (Quest, 1983)
- To Drink or Not to Drink: A Sober Look at the Problem (Quest, 1984)
- Perspectives: Understanding and Evaluating Today's World Views (Here's Life, 1984)
- Christianity Under Attack (Quest, 1985)
- False Gods of Our Time: A Defense of the Christian Faith (Harvest House, 1985)
- A General Introduction to the Bible, Second Edition, Revised and Expanded (Moody, 1986)(Third Edition with revisions and expansion underway as of 2019 with projected publish date in 2021.)
- Reincarnation Sensation (Tyndale, 1986)
- Origin Science (Baker, 1987)
- Philosophy of Religion (Expansion and Revision of #5. Baker, 1988| Bastion Books, 2021?)
- Signs and Wonders (Tyndale, 1988 | Bastion Books, 2019)
- Worlds Apart : A Handbook on World Views (Baker. Reprint and retitle of #22)
- Knowing the Truth About Creation (Servant, 1989 | Bastion Books, 2013)
- The Infiltration of the New Age (Tyndale, 1989)
- The Battle for the Resurrection (Thomas Nelson, 1989 | Bastion Books, 2013)
- Apologetics in the New Age (Baker, 1990)
- Come Let Us Reason: An Introduction to Logical Thinking (Baker, 1990)
- When Skeptics Ask: A Handbook on Christian Evidences (Baker, 1990, 2013)
- Gambling: A Bad Bet (Fleming H. Revel, 1990 | Bastion Books, 2013)
- The Life and Death Debate (Greenwood, 1990)
- In Defense of the Resurrection (Quest, 1991 | Bastion Books, 2015)
- Thomas Aquinas: An Evangelical Appraisal (Baker, 1991)
- Matters of Life and Death: Calm Answers to Tough Questions (Baker, 1991)
- Miracles and the Modern Mind: A Defense of Biblical Miracles (Baker, 1992 | Bastion Books, 2012)
- When Critics Ask: A Handbook on Bible Difficulties (Victor, 1992)
- Answering Islam (Baker, 1993)
- Roman Catholics and Evangelicals: Agreements and Differences (Baker, 1995)
- Love is Always Right (Word, 1996)
- Creating God in the Image of Man? (Bethany, 1997)
- When Cultists Ask (Baker, 1997)
- The Counterfeit Gospel of Mormonism (Harvest House, 1998)
- Legislating Morality (Bethany, 1998)
- Baker's Encyclopedia of Christian Apologetics (Baker, 1999)
- Chosen But Free : A Balanced view of God's Sovereignty and Free Will (Bethany, 1999)
- Unshakable Foundations (Bethany, 2001)
- Why I Am a Christian : Leading Thinkers Explain Why they Believe (Baker, 2001)
- The Battle for God: Responding to the Challenge of Neotheism (Kregel, 2001)
- Living Loud: Defending Your Faith (Broadman & Holman, 2002)
- Answering Islam, Updated and Revised (Bethany, 2002)
- Who Made God? (Zondervan, 2003)
- Is Your Church Ready? Motivating Leaders to Live an Apologetic Life (Zondervan, 2003)
- I Don't Have Enough Faith to Be an Atheist (Crossway, 2004)
- Systematic Theology, Vol. 1 (Bethany, 2002)
- Systematic Theology, Vol. 2 (Bethany, 2003)
- Systematic Theology, Vol. 3 (Bethany, 2004)
- Systematic Theology, Vol. 4 (Bethany, 2005)
- Bringing Your Faith to Work: Answers for Break-Room Skeptics (Baker, 2005)
- Correcting the Cults: Expert Responses to Their Scripture Twisting (Baker, 2005, reprint of #....)
- * Why I Am a Christian : Leading Thinkers Explain why They Believe (revised for Baker, 2006)
- Integrity at Work : Finding Your Ethical Compass in a Post-Enron World (Baker, 2007)
- Creation and the Courts: Eighty Years of Conflict in the Classroom and the Courtroom (Crossway, 2007)
- A Popular Survey of the New Testament (Baker, 2007)
- Love Your Neighbor: Thinking Wisely about Right and Wrong (Crossway, 2007)
- Reasons for Faith: Making a Case for the Christian Faith (Crossway, 2007)
- Conviction Without Compromise: Standing Strong in the Core Beliefs of the Christian Faith (Harvest House, 2008)
- The Apologetics of Jesus: A Caring Approach to Dealing with Doubters (Baker, 2008)
- Conversational Evangelism (Harvest House, 2008)
- Is Rome the True Church? (Crossway, 2008)
- The Big Book of Bible Difficulties (Baker 2008, reprint of #43)
- Making Sense of Bible Difficulties (Baker, 2009, abridgement of #43)
- Chosen But Free: A Balanced View of God's Sovereignty and Free Will (third edition, revised and expanded, Bethany, 2010)
- Christian Ethics, Second Edition (Baker, 2010)
- If God, Why Evil? (Bethany, 2011)
- Systematic Theology in One Volume (Bethany, 2011)
- Defending Inerrancy: Affirming the Accuracy of Scriptures for a New Generation (Baker, 2012) (Revision and expansion underway as of 2019 by Bill Roach will include much of Norm's thought and writings on the defense of inerrancy between 2011 and 2019.)
- Reasons for Belief : Easy-to-Understand Answers to 10 Essential Questions (Bethany, 2012)
- Reasons for Belief Study Guide (Bastion Books, 2014)
- A Popular Handbook of Biblical Archaeology: Discoveries that Confirm the Reliability of Scripture (Bethany, 2012)
- The Big Book of Christian Apologetics (Baker, 2012) (Minor revision of The Baker Encyclopedia of Christian Apologetics)
- Christian Apologetics (revised, Baker, 2012)
- Twelve Points that Show Christianity is True (NGIM, 2012)
- Explaining Biblical Inerrancy: The Chicago Statements on Biblical Inerrancy, Hermeneutics, and Application with Official ICBI Commentary (Bastion Books, 2013)
- The Christian Ethic of Love (2012, a minor revision of #4)
- From God to Us (Moody, 2012) (a major revision and update of #6 with some additions from #25.)
- Is the Pope Infallible: A Look at the Evidence (Bastion Books, 2012)
- The Roots of Evil, Third Edition (Bastion Books, 2013. A Minor revision of #4)
- Should Believers Make Ashes of Themselves? Cremation, the Burning Question (Bastion, 2013)
- Should Old Aquinas Be Forgotten? (Bastion Books, 2013. Revision and expansion of #37)
- The Atheist's Fatal Flaw (Baker, 2014)
- The Jesus Quest: the Danger from Within (Xulon, 2014)
- The Bible's Answer to 100 of Life's Biggest Questions (Baker, 2015)
- The Shack: Helpful or Hurtful? (Bastion Books, 2011)
- Teacher's Guide to Twelve Points That Show Christianity is True (NGIM, 2012).
- Beware of Philosophy (Bastion Books, 2012)
- A History of Western Philosophy: Vol 1: Ancient and Medieval (Bastion Books, 2012)
- A History of Western Philosophy: Vol 2: Modern and Contemporary (Bastion Books, 2012)
- A Handbook on World Views: A Catalogue for Worldview Shoppers (Bastion Books, 2013) (A minor revision of Worlds Apart)
- Biblical Inerrancy: The Historical Evidence (Bastion Books, 2013) (A minor Revision of #15)
- What in Cremation is Going On? (Bastion Books, 2014) (Abridgement of # 86)
- The Official Study Guide to I Don't Have Enough Faith to be an Atheist (Xulon Press, 2014)
- The Religion of the Force (Bastion Books, 2015) (Update and expansion of #19)
- God: A Philosophical Argument (Bastion Books, 2015)
- Evidence of an Early New Testament Canon (Bastion Books, 2015)
- Romans in Logical Form (Bastion Books, 2015)
- Vital Issues in the Inerrancy Debate (Wipf & Stock, 2016) (review)
- How to Know God (Bastion Books, 2016) (In English and Spanish)
- A Prolegomena to Evangelical Theology (Bastion Books, 2016)
- A Popular Survey of Bible Doctrine (Bastion Books, 2015)
- A Prolegomena to Evangelical Theology (Bastion Books, 2016)
- The Bible: Its Origin, Nature and Collection: NGIM Guide to Bible Doctrine, Book 1 (NGIM.org, 2015)
- The Doctrine of God: NGIM Guide to Bible Doctrine, Book 2 (NGIM.org, 2015)
- The Doctrine of Christ: NGIM Guide to Bible Doctrine, Book 3 (NGIM.org, 2016)
- The Doctrine of Creation: NGIM Guide to Bible Doctrine, Book 4 (NGIM.org, 2016)
- The Doctrine of Angels & Demons: NGIM Guide to Bible Doctrine, Book 5 (NGIM.org, 2016)
- Preserving Orthodoxy: Maintaining Continuity with the Historic Christian Faith on Scripture (Bastion Books, 2017)
- Somewhere Under the Rainbow: A Christian look at Same-Sex “Marriage” (Bastion Books, 2017)
- Having Fun Under the Sun: A Study of Ecclesiastes (Bastion Books, 2018)
- The Collected Work of Norm Geisler, Volumes 1-5 (Bastion Books, 2019) Vol. 1 (1964–1979) | Vol. 2 (19xx-19xx)| Vol. 3 (19xx-19xx)| Vol. 4 (19xx-19xx)| Vol. 5 (19xx-19xx)
- *Conviction without Compromise: Standing Strong in the Core Beliefs of the Christian Faith (NGIM.org, 2021) (An unrevised republishing of #73)
- Is Man the Measure? An Evaluation of Contemporary Humanism and Transhumanism (Bastion Books, 2021? – Forthcoming) (A major update to and expansion of #18)

== Publications ==
- Geisler, Norman L (1971), Ethics: Alternatives and Issues, Zondervan.
- Geisler, Norman L (1973), The Christian Ethic of Love, Zondervan.
- Geisler, Norman L (1974), From God to Us, Moody.
- Geisler, Norman L (1975), To Understand the Bible—Look for Jesus, Moody.
- Geisler, Norman L (1976), Christian Apologetics, Baker.
- Geisler, Norman L (1977), A Popular Survey of the Old Testament, Baker.
- Geisler, Norman L (1978), The Roots of Evil, Zondervan.
- Geisler, Norman L (1979), Inerrancy, Zondervan.
- Geisler, Norman L (1980), Introduction to Philosophy: A Christian Perspective, Baker.
- Geisler, Norman L (1981), Options in Contemporary Christian Ethics, Baker.
- Geisler, Norman L (1981), Biblical Errancy: Its Philosophical Roots, Zondervan.
- Geisler, Norman L (1982), Decide for Yourself: How History Views the Bible, Zondervan.
- Geisler, Norman L (1982), The Creator in the Courtroom—Scopes II, et al, Baker.
- Geisler, Norman L (1981), What Augustine Says, Baker.
- Geisler, Norman L (1983), Is Man the Measure?, Baker.
- Geisler, Norman L (1983), Cosmos: Carl Sagan's Religion for the Scientific Mind, Quest.
- Geisler, Norman L (1983), Religion of the Force, Quest.
- Geisler, Norman L (1984), To Drink or Not to Drink: A Sober Look at the Problem, Quest.
- Geisler, Norman L (1984), Perspectives: Understanding and Evaluating Today's World Views, Here's Life.
- Geisler, Norman L (1985), Christianity Under Attack (book, video series), Quest.
- Geisler, Norman L (1985), False Gods of Our Time, Harvest.
- Geisler, Normal L (1986) [1968], General Introduction to the Bible (revised & expanded ed.), Moody.
- Geisler, Norman L (1986), Reincarnation Sensation, Tyndale.
- Geisler, Norman L (1987), Origin Science, Baker.
- Geisler, Norman L (1988) [1974], Philosophy of Religion, Zondervan.
- Geisler, Norman L (1988), Signs and Wonders, Tyndale.
- Geisler, Norman L (September 1, 1989), Christian Ethics: Options and Issues (8 impr ed.), Baker, ISBN 978-0-80103832-7.
- Geisler, Norman L (1989a), World's Apart, Baker.
- Geisler, Norman L (1989b), Knowing The Truth About Creation, Servant.
- Geisler, Norman L (1989c), The Infiltration of the New Age, Tyndale.
- Geisler, Norman L (1989d), The Battle for the Resurrection, Thomas Nelson.
- Geisler, Norman L (1990), Apologetics in the New Age, Baker.
- Geisler, Norman L (1990), Come Let Us Reason: An Introduction to Logical Thinking, Baker.
- Geisler, Norman L (1990), Gambling: A Bad Bet, Fleming H Revell.
- Geisler, Norman L (1990), The Life and Death Debate, Greenwood.
- Geisler, Norman L (1991), In Defense of the Resurrection, Quest.
- Geisler, Norman L (1991), Thomas Aquinas: An Evangelical Appraisal.
- Geisler, Norman L (1991), Matters of Life and Death: Calm Answers to Tough Questions about Abortion and Euthanasia, Baker.
- Geisler, Norman L (1991), Miracles and the Modern Mind: A Defense of Biblical Miracles, Baker.
- Geisler, Norman L (1992), When Critics Ask: A Handbook on Bible Difficulties, Victor.
- Geisler, Norman L (1992), Miracles and the Modern Mind: A Defense of Biblical Miracles, Baker.
- Geisler, Norman L (1993), Answering Islam, Baker.
- Geisler, Norman L (1995), Roman Catholics and Evangelicals.
- Geisler, Norman L (1996), Love Is Always Right, Word.
- Geisler, Norman L (1997), Creating God in the Image of Man?, Bethany.
- Geisler, Norman L; Rhodes, Ron (1997), When Cultists Ask: A Popular Handbook on Cultic Misinterpretation, Baker.
- Geisler, Norman L (1998a), The Counterfeit Gospel of Mormonism, Eugene, OR: Harvest House.
- Geisler, Norman L (1998b), Legislating Morality, Bethany House.
- Geisler, Norman L (1999a), Encyclopedia of Christian Apologetics, Baker.
- Geisler, Norman L (1999b), Chosen But Free, Bethany.
- Geisler, Norman L (2001), Unshakable Foundations, Bethany.
- Geisler, Norman L (2001), Why I Am a Christian, Baker.
- Geisler, Norman L (2001), Battle for God, Kregel.
- Geisler, Norman L (2002), Living Loud: Defending Your Faith, Broadman & Holman.
- Geisler, Norman L (2002), Systematic Theology, vol. 1. Introduction – Bible, Bethany.
- Geisler, Norman L (2003), Systematic Theology, vol. 2. God – Creation, Bethany.
- Geisler, Norman L (2003), Is Your Church Ready?, Zondervan.
- Geisler, Norman L (2003), Who Made God?, Zondervan.
- Geisler, Norman L (2004), Systematic Theology, vol. 3. Sin – Salvation, Bethany.
- Geisler, Norman L (2004), I Don't Have Enough Faith to Be an Atheist, Crossway.
- Geisler, Norman L (2005), Systematic Theology, vol. 4. Church – Last Things, Bethany.
- Geisler, Norman L (2005), Bringing Your Faith To Work, Baker.
- Geisler, Norman L; Rhodes, Ron (2005), Correcting The Cults, Baker.
- Geisler, Norman L (2007), Love Your Neighbor, Crossway.
- Geisler, Norman L (2007), Essential Doctrine Made Easy, Rose.
- Geisler, Norman L (2008), A Popular Survey of the Old Testament, Baker.
- Geisler, Norman L (2008), A Popular Survey of the New Testament, Baker.
- Geisler, Norman L; Rhodes, Ron (2008), Conviction Without Compromise, Harvest House.
- Geisler, Norman L (2008), Is Rome the True Church?: A Consideration of the Roman Catholic Claim, Crossway.
- Geisler, Norman L (2008), When Skeptics Ask, Baker.
- Geisler, Norman L (2008), The Big Book of Bible Difficulties, Baker.
- Geisler, Norman L (April 17, 2009), "Any Absolutes? Absolutely!", Equip, Christian Research Institute, DE198.
- Geisler, Norman L (2009a), The Apologetics of Jesus, Baker.
- Geisler, Norman L (2009b), Making Sense of Bible Difficulties, Baker.
- Geisler, Norman L (January 1, 2010) [1989], Christian Ethics: Contemporary Issues and Options [Christian Ethics: Options and Issues] (2 ed.), Grand Rapids, MI: Baker Academic, ISBN 978-0-80103879-2.
- Geisler, Norman L (2011), If God, Why Evil?, Bethany.
- Geisler, Norman L (2011), Systematic Theology: In One Volume, Bethany, ISBN 978-0-76420603-0.
- Geisler, Norman L; Roach, William C (2012), Defending Inerrancy: Affirming the Accuracy of Scripture for a New Generation, Packer, JI foreword, Baker, ISBN 978-0-80101434-5.
- Geisler, Norman L; Nix, William E (2012), From God To Us Revised and Expanded: How We Got Our Bible, Moody, ISBN 978-0-80242882-0.
- Geisler, Norman L (2012), Big Book of Christian Apologetics, The: An A to Z Guide, A to Z Guides, Baker, ISBN 978-0-80101417-8.
- Geisler, Norman L; Tunnicliffe, Patty (2013), Reasons for Belief: Easy-to-Understand Answers to 10 Essential Questions, Bethany, ISBN 978-0-76421057-0.
- Geisler, Norman L; Brooks, Norman L (2013), When Skeptics Ask: A Handbook on Christian Evidences, Baker, ISBN 978-0-80101498-7.
- Geisler, Norman L (2013) [1976], Christian Apologetics (revised & expanded ed.), Baker, ISBN 978-0-80104854-8.
