= Angela Berry-White =

American soccer player (born 1968)

Personal information
- Full name: Angela Berry White
- Birth name: Angela Christine Berry
- Date of birth: August 7, 1968 (age 58)
- Place of birth: Indianapolis, Indiana
- Height: 5 ft 7 in (1.70 m)
- Position: Defender

Youth career
- 1982–1986: North Central High School

College career
Years	Team	Apps	(Gls)
1986–1989	George Mason Patriots		

International career
1992–1993	United States	2	(0)

Managerial career
- 1991–1992: Butler Bulldogs (assistant)
- 1993–1997: Indiana Hoosiers (assistant)
- 2014–2024: Brebeuf Jesuit Preparatory School
- 2025–: IU Indy

Angela Berry White (born Angela Christine Berry; August 7, 1968) is a soccer coach and former player. She is currently the head coach of the IU Indy Jaguars women's soccer team.

== Playing career ==
Angela Berry White played soccer at George Mason University. While at George Mason in the 1980s, she was a three-time All-American soccer player. She was a member of the United States national team in 1992 and 1993. She played in the USWISL for Cincinnati and Columbus. She was inducted into the Indiana Soccer Hall of Fame in 2007.

== Coaching career ==
Berry-White began her coaching career as an assistant women's soccer coach at Butler University and Indiana University. She was the girls' soccer head coach of Brebeuf Jesuit Preparatory School for eleven years, from 2014 to 2024.

Berry-White was hired as the head coach at Indiana University Indianapolis (IU Indy) prior to the 2025 season.

== Career statistics ==
Appearances and goals by national team and year
National team	Year	Apps	Goals
United States	1992	1	0
United States	1993	1	0
Total		2	0
