= Frank Turek =

Christian apologist and author (born 1961)

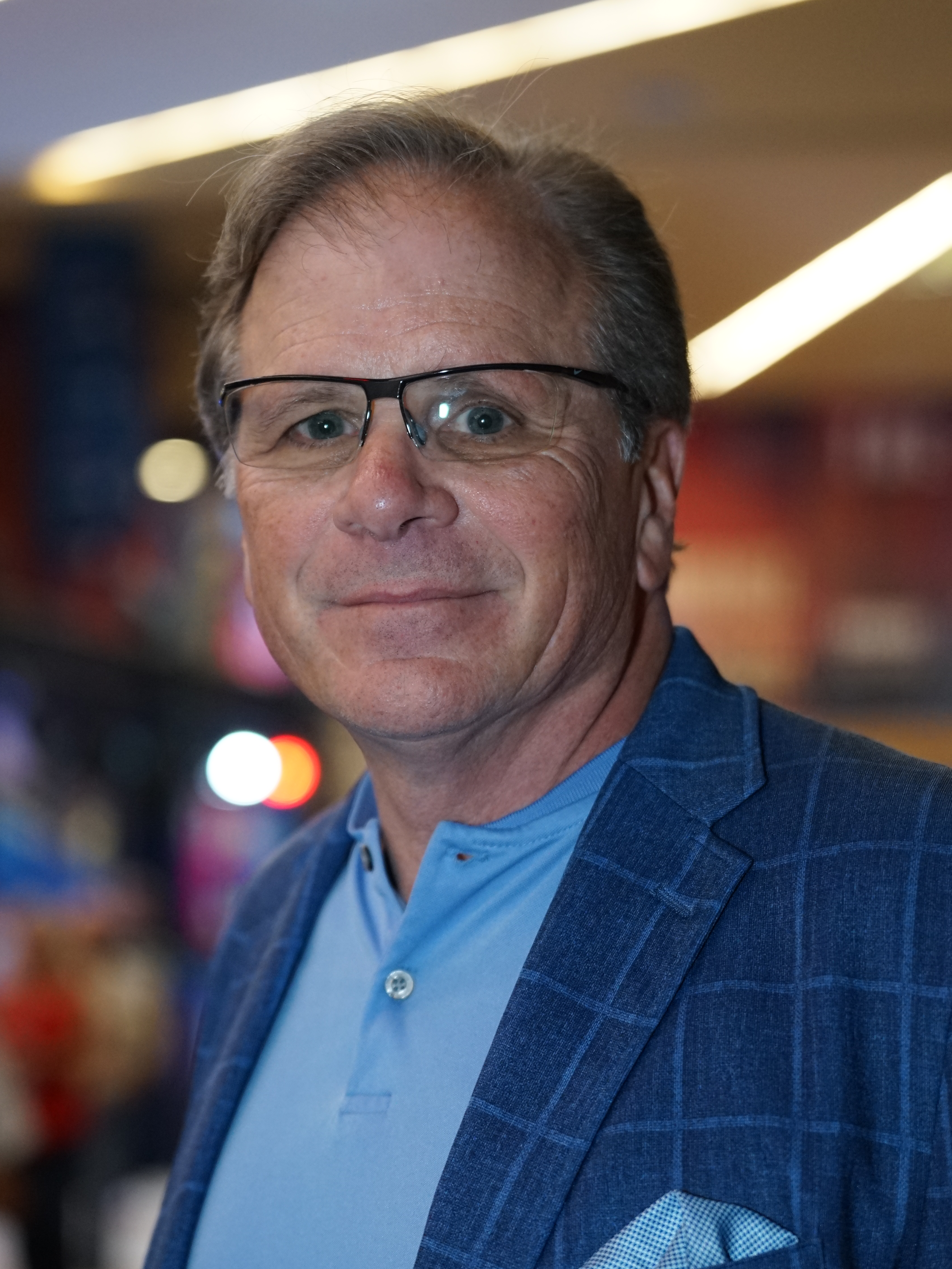
- Turek in 2025
- Born: November 20, 1961 (age 64); Neptune Township, New Jersey, U.S.
- Education: George Washington University (MPA); Southern Evangelical Seminary (DMin)
- Occupations: Christian apologist, author
- Title: President of CrossExamined.org
- Political party: Independent
- Military career
- Branch: United States Navy
- Rank: Naval flight officer
- Website: crossexamined.org

Frank Turek (born November 20, 1961) is an American Christian apologist and author. He is best known as the founder and president of the Christian apologetics ministry CrossExamined.org. Turek has co-authored two books with Christian philosopher Norman Geisler: Legislating Morality and I Don't Have Enough Faith to Be an Atheist. He is also the author of the books Correct, Not Politically Correct and Stealing from God.

Turek hosts a call-in talk show called CrossExamined on American Family Radio. He also hosts a television show, I Don't Have Enough Faith to Be an Atheist, which airs on the NRB Network.

== Early life ==
Turek was born in Neptune, New Jersey, on November 20, 1961. He was raised Catholic, but he became a Protestant during his time as a flight officer in the U.S. Navy after being recommended apologetic books written by Josh McDowell, in particular Evidence That Demands a Verdict and More Than a Carpenter.

Turek earned a Master of Public Administration degree from George Washington University. He also earned a Doctor of Ministry in Apologetics degree from Southern Evangelical Seminary. He has taught classes in Leadership and Management at George Washington University.

== Career ==
=== Christian Apologetics ===
Turek co-authored the book I Don't Have Enough Faith to Be an Atheist with Norman Geisler. Turek frequently delivers seminars based on the book at universities and churches throughout America. He is a creationist advocating for the pseudoscientific argument of intelligent design. He is a critic of macroevolution, but believes that adaptations in species occur over time.

In 2008, Turek and atheist Christopher Hitchens debated the existence of God. On March 31, 2009, Turek and Hitchens debated the topic of atheism or theism best explaining reality at the College of New Jersey in Trenton, New Jersey.

In 2023, New Testament professor Clark Bates edited a festschrift honoring Turek's contributions to apologetics, titled Faith Examined: New Arguments for Persistent Questions.

=== Other ===
On September 10, 2025, Turek was present during the assassination of Charlie Kirk, whom he described as "my dear friend." Turek was in the SUV assisting the team evacuating Kirk to the hospital. He later spoke at Kirk's memorial service on September 21.

== Views ==
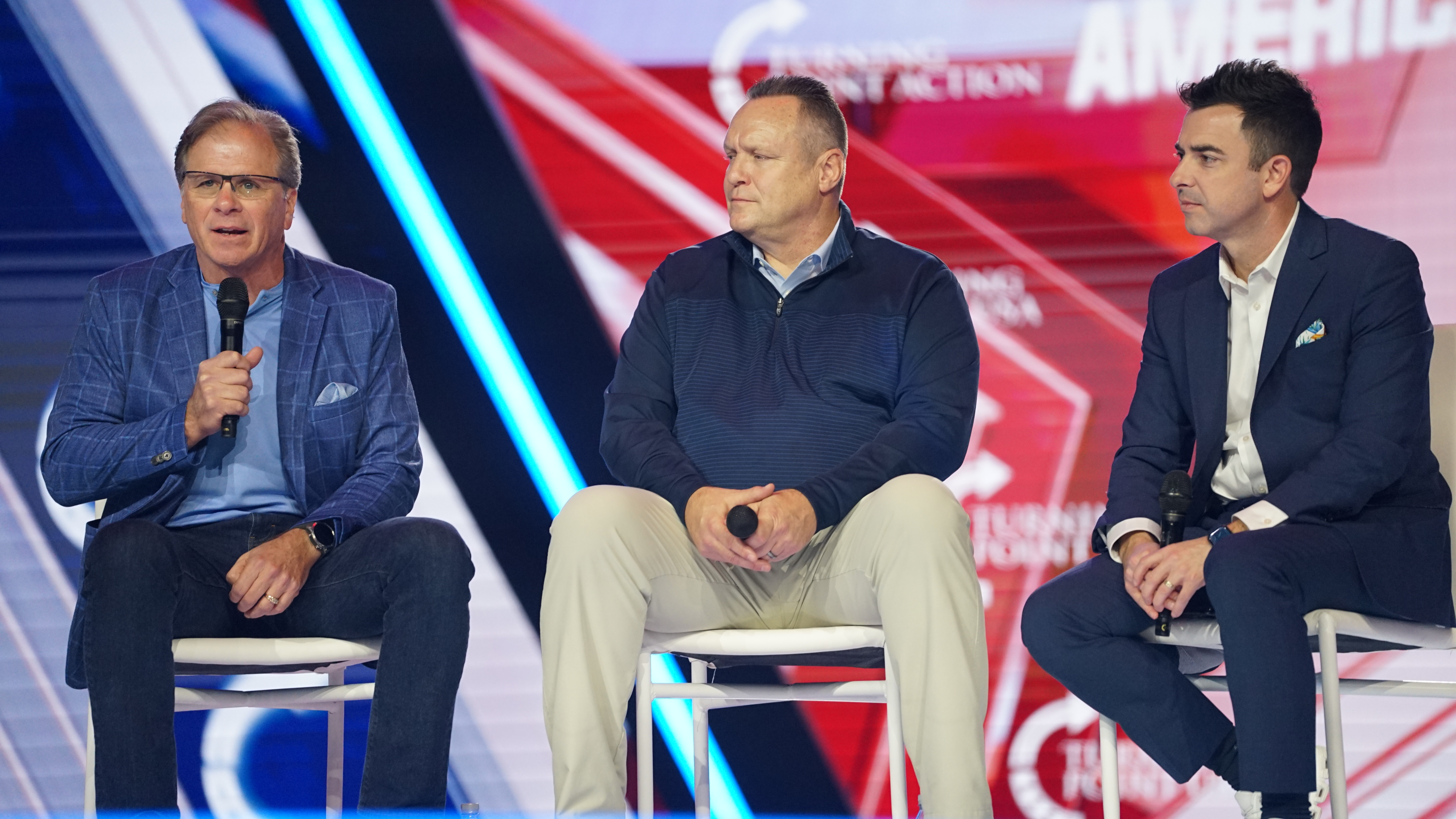
Turek, Scott Baller, Lucas Miles at AmericaFest 2025

In the book I Don't Have Enough Faith to Be an Atheist, Geisler and Turek state that American culture demands truth, but does not typically do so when it comes to morality or religion. The authors argue that truth is based in correspondence to an absolute reality, and is therefore not subjective. On this basis, Geisler and Turek argue that religious truth is also objective, and for one to claim that "all truth is relative" or "there are no absolutes" is self-refuting.

After arguing for the objectivity of truth, Geisler and Turek argue for the objectivity of knowledge. They ask those who argue that one cannot know anything for sure, whether they can know that for sure. They argue that if the proponent is sure, the statement presented is, therefore, self-refuting; and, if the proponent is not sure, the presented argument collapses. Geisler and Turek conclude that people cannot be skeptics about everything, as the proponent would logically have to doubt skepticism: the more one doubts skepticism, the more certain they become.

Geisler and Turek argue that the existence of God implies the possibility of miracles. Borrowing an illustration seminary professor Ronald H. Nash created (a metaphor of the universe representing an open box from a theistic worldview perspective), they argue that the universe is effectively open for the creator of the universe to reach in and perform what one might call miracles. Geisler and Turek expand on the metaphor by claiming "a worldview is like a box top that allows you to place the many pieces of life's puzzle into a complete, cohesive picture."

=== Marriage ===
Turek argues in Correct, Not Politically Correct: How Same-Sex Marriage Hurts Everyone that marriage lengthens the lifespans of men and women, civilizes men, protects women, protects mothers, lowers welfare costs, and encourages a replacement birth rate. He argues that same-sex marriage does none of these.

In 2010, a student in a Cisco leadership seminar that Turek taught discovered Turek's views on marriage and reported them to the company's human resources department; consequently, Turek lost his position as consultant for Cisco. Bank of America cancelled a seminar presentation for the same reason.

== Bibliography ==
Turek's co-authored book Legislating Morality: Is It Wise? Is It Legal? Is It Possible? was the winner of the Evangelical Christian Publishers Association's Gold Medallion Book Award in the "Christianity and Society" category in 1999.

- Legislating Morality: Is it Wise? Is it Legal? Is it Possible? (1998) ISBN 978-0764220944
- I Don't Have Enough Faith to Be an Atheist (2004) ISBN 978-1581345612
- Correct, Not Politically Correct: How Same-Sex Marriage Hurts Everyone (2008) ISBN 978-1607081623
- Stealing from God: Why Atheists Need God to Make Their Case (2014) ISBN 978-1-61291-701-6
- Hollywood Heroes: How Your Favorite Movies Reveal God (2021) ISBN 978-1-64158-351-0
- The War on Reality: Recovering Truth in a World that Celebrates Lies (2026) ISBN 978-0-7369-9363-0
