= Melinda Darby Dyar =

American planetary geologist, mineralogist and spectroscopist

- Occupations: Kennedy-Schelkunoff Professor of Astronomy and Chair of Astronomy at Mount Holyoke College

Academic background
- Education: Wellesley College, Massachusetts Institute of Technology

Academic work
- Discipline: planetary geologist, mineralogist, and spectroscopist

Melinda Darby Dyar is a planetary geologist, mineralogist, and spectroscopist whose research relates to the evolution of the Solar System. She studies the redox state of iron and the abundance of hydrogen using Mössbauer, x-ray absorption, and FTIR spectroscopy in the Solar System planets, specifically Earth, Moon, Mars, Mercury, and Venus.

== Personal life and education ==
Dyar attended North Central High School in Indianapolis, Indiana. Her father was an engineer who worked on gas turbine engines at General Motors in Indianapolis where he also helped build the Apollo Lunar Modules.

In 1980, Dyar graduated from Wellesley College where she double-majored in art history and geology. For her senior thesis, she identified rock formations along the Charles River in the Broadmoor Wildlife Sanctuary, run by the Massachusetts Audubon Society, in Natick, Massachusetts. She received her Ph.D. in the geochemistry doctoral program at Massachusetts Institute of Technology in 1985.

== Career ==
In 1985, Dyar wrote an influential review paper on the use of Mössbauer spectroscopy, which utilizes the Mössbauer effect in order to measure the absorption of gamma rays emitted by a nucleus without energy being lost in recoil. Dyar determined the concentrations of oxygen that were present at the time of formation from measurements of the valence levels of iron.

Dyar serves on three of the eight NASA Solar System Exploration Virtual Institutes. She and her team helped calibrate NASA's Curiosity rover and contributed by using the Chemistry and Camera (ChemCam) tool that sits on the front of the rover to analyze Martian minerals for hydrogen and soil.

Dyar is a senior scientist at the Planetary Science Institute and at Toolbox for Research and Exploration (TREX).

In 1986, she served as a professor of geology at the University of Oregon in Eugene. She currently is a Kennedy-Schelkunoff Professor of Astronomy and Chair of Astronomy at Mount Holyoke College where she supports undergraduate researchers in her Mineral Spectroscopy Laboratory. She has written more than 260 peer-reviewed papers in scientific journals, analyzing geologic materials using Raman, LIBS, XANES, and FTIR, and two textbooks on mineralogy and geo-statistics that have been widely adopted in college classrooms. Dyar has recently received a grant from the National Aeronautics and Space Association (NASA) for Collaborative Research: Redox Ratios in Amphiboles as Proxies for Volatile Budgets in Igneous Systems. This project is three years.

Dyar is the deputy principal investigator for the VERITAS (spacecraft) mission to Venus selected by NASA on June 2, 2021.

== Achievements ==
Dyar has been awarded more than $10 million in diverse grants from NASA and NSF.

On September 27, 2016, Dyar received the G.K. Gilbert Award from the Planetary Geology Division of the Geological Society of America for her outstanding contributions to the solution of fundamental problems in planetary geology. She became the fourth woman and the second Wellesley alumnus to receive the award.

In 2017, Dyar was awarded the Hawley Medal from the Mineralogical Society of Canada.

In 2018, she received the Eugene Shoemaker Distinguished Scientist Medal from NASA's Solar System Exploration Research Virtual Institute for her extensive contributions to the field of lunar science.

In 2020, Dyar was named as a recipient of Wellesley College's Alumnae Achievement Award.

== Publications ==
- M. Darby Dyar; Caleb I. Fassett; Stephen Giguere; Kate Lepore; Sarah Byrne; Thomas Boucher; CJ Carey; Sridhar Mahadevan (September 2016). "Comparison of univariate and multivariate models for prediction of major and minor elements from laser-induced breakdown spectra with and without masking". Spectrochimica Acta Part B. 123: 93–104. Bibcode:2016AcSpe.123...93D. doi:10.1016/J.SAB.2016.07.010. ISSN 0584-8547. Wikidata Q106567984.
- M. Darby Dyar; Stephen Giguere; CJ Carey; Thomas Boucher (December 2016). "Comparison of baseline removal methods for laser-induced breakdown spectroscopy of geological samples". Spectrochimica Acta Part B. 126: 53–64. Bibcode:2016AcSpe.126...53D. doi:10.1016/J.SAB.2016.10.018. ISSN 0584-8547. Wikidata Q106568000.
- M. Darby Dyar; Elly A. Breves; Mickey E. Gunter; et al. (May 2016). "Use of multivariate analysis for synchrotron micro-XANES analysis of iron valence state in amphiboles". American Mineralogist. 101 (5): 1171–1189. Bibcode:2016AmMin.101.1171D. doi:10.2138/AM-2016-5556. ISSN 0003-004X. Wikidata Q106568005.
