= Scott B. Rae =

Scott Bothic Rae

Academic background
- Education: Southern Methodist University, Dallas Theological Seminary, University of Southern California
- Thesis: (1992)

Academic work
- Discipline: Biblical Studies
- Sub-discipline: Old Testament Studies, Biblical Ethics
- Institutions: Biola University

Scott Bothic Rae is an American Old Testament scholar, theologian, and professor of Christian ethics. He serves as dean of the faculty and chair of the department of philosophy at Biola University's Talbot School of Theology. In 2014, Rae was elected to serve a term as president of the Evangelical Theological Society. He is a senior fellow for The Center for Bioethics & Human Dignity.

Rae earned his B.A.S. in economics from Southern Methodist University (1976), his Th.M. in Old Testament from Dallas Theological Seminary (1981), and his Ph.D. in social ethics from the University of Southern California (1992). Prior to beginning his tenure at Talbot School of Theology in 1989, he served as an associate pastor for five years at Mariners Church and for five years before that as an instructor in Old Testament at the International School of Theology in San Bernardino, California.

Rae has defended Thomistic substance dualism.

== Publications ==
Rae has authored or coauthored over 11 books, including:

- Rae, Scott B. (1993). Reproductive Technologies and the Theology of the Family. Evangelical Theological Society papers. Vol. ETS-4541. Evangelical Theological Society. OCLC 31273482.
- ——— (1994). The Ethics of Commercial Surrogate Motherhood: brave new families?. Westport, CT: Praeger. ISBN 978-0-2759-4679-1. OCLC 28065098.
- ——— (1995). Moral Choices: An Introduction to Ethics (1st ed.). Grand Rapids, MI: Zondervan Publishing House. ISBN 031020013X.
- ———; Wong, Kenman L. (1996). Beyond Integrity: A Judeo-Christian Approach to Business Ethics (1st ed.). Grand Rapids, MI: Zondervan. ISBN 9780310201731. OCLC 34046805.
- ——— (1996). Brave New Families: Biblical Ethics and Reproductive Technologies. Grand Rapids, MI: Baker Books. ISBN 978-0-801-02077-3. OCLC 34474117. (Review)
- ———; Cox, Paul M. (1999). Bioethics: A Christian Approach in a Pluralistic Age. Grand Rapids, MI: Eerdmans Publishing. ISBN 978-0-802-84595-5. OCLC 41184971. (Review)
- ———; Moreland, James Porter (2000). Body & Soul: Human Nature & the Crisis in Ethics. Downers Grove, IL: InterVarsity Press. ISBN 978-0-830-81577-7. OCLC 43245896.
- ——— (2000). Moral Choices: An Introduction to Ethics (2nd ed.). Grand Rapids, MI: Zondervan Publishing House. ISBN 9780310230151. OCLC 43951984.
- ———; Hill, Austin (2010). The Virtues of Capitalism: A Moral Case for Free Markets. Chicago, IL: Northfield Pub. ISBN 978-0-802-48456-7. OCLC 462894101.
- ———; Riley, D. Joy (2010). Outside the Womb: Moral Guidance for Assisted Reproduction. Chicago, IL: Moody Publishers. ISBN 978-0-8024-5042-5. OCLC 642841937.
- ——— (2011). Business for the Common Good: A Christian Vision for the Marketplace. Christian worldview integration series. Downers Grove, IL: IVP Academic. ISBN 978-0-830-82816-6. OCLC 666573604.
- ———; Wong, Kenman L. (2012). Beyond Integrity: A Judeo-Christian Approach to Business Ethics (2nd revised ed.). Grand Rapids, MI: Zondervan. ISBN 978-0310291107.
- ——— (2013). Doing the Right Thing: Making Moral Choices in a World Full of Options. Grand Rapids, MI: Zondervan. ISBN 978-0-310-51399-5. OCLC 843228559.
