= Jerry Walls =

American philosopher

Jerry L. Walls

Education
- Education: University of Notre Dame (PhD), Yale Divinity School (STM), Princeton Seminary (MDiv), Houghton College (BA)

Philosophical work
- Era: 21st-century philosophy
- Region: Western philosophy
- Institutions: Houston Christian University
- Main interests: philosophy of religion, Christian apologetics

Jerry L. Walls is an American philosopher and Professor of Philosophy at Houston Christian University. He is known for his works on Christian apologetics and philosophy of religion.

== Books ==
- Hell: The Logic of Damnation, University of Notre Dame Press, 1992
- Heaven: The Logic of Eternal Joy, Oxford University Press, 2002
- Purgatory: The Logic of Total Transformation, Oxford University Press, 2011
- Good God: The Theistic Foundations of Morality, with David Baggett, Oxford University Press, 2011
- God and Cosmos: Moral Truth and Human Meaning, with David Baggett, Oxford University Press, 2016
- Two Dozen (or so) Arguments for God: the Plantinga Project, with Trent Dougherty, Oxford University Press, 2018
