= Chicago Statement on Biblical Inerrancy =

1978 statement formulated by evangelical leaders

The Chicago Statement on Biblical Inerrancy is a written statement of belief that was formulated by more than 200 evangelical leaders at a conference convened by the International Council on Biblical Inerrancy and held in Chicago in October 1978. The statement was designed to defend the position of biblical inerrancy against a trend toward liberal conceptions of Scripture.

The subsequent November 1982 Chicago Statement on Biblical Hermeneutics recognised the need to add a hermeneutical framework to the statement.

Finally the December 1986 conference adopted the Chicago Statement on Biblical Application.

== Inerrancy statement ==
The inerrancy statement elaborates on various details in articles formed as couplets of "We affirm ..." and "We deny ...". Under the statement, inerrancy applies only to the "original manuscripts" which no longer exist, but which, its adherents claim, "can be ascertained from available manuscripts with great accuracy" (Article 10). In the statement, inerrancy does not refer to a blind literal interpretation, and that "history must be treated as history, poetry as poetry, hyperbole and metaphor as hyperbole and metaphor, generalization and approximation as what they are, and so forth". It also makes it clear that the signers deny "that Biblical infallibility and inerrancy are limited to spiritual, religious, or redemptive themes, exclusive of assertions in the fields of history and science. We further deny that scientific hypotheses about earth history may properly be used to overturn the teaching of Scripture on creation and the flood."

Signatories to the statement came from a variety of evangelical Christian denominations, and included Robert Preus, James Montgomery Boice, Kenneth Kantzer, J. I. Packer, Francis Schaeffer, R. C. Sproul, and John F. MacArthur.

== Hermeneutics statement ==
The hermeneutics statement recognized that "the values of a commitment [to inerrancy] are only as real as one's understanding of the meaning of Scripture". It particularly aimed to address "the meaning of the 'grammatico-historical exegesis' mentioned in Article XIII".

== Biblical application statement ==
The foci of the summit on biblical application were "the Trinitarian foundations that must give shape to all the church's life and witness, and then on a number of community concerns that come under the heading of Christian social ethics. These themes were chosen partly for their intrinsic importance and partly because there is need to dispel doubts as to whether Bible believers can ever agree on how to respond to them. ... [It] offers a high degree of consensus as to how a trusted Bible directs prayer, planning and action in today's drifting society."

== Notable signers ==
- Gleason Archer Jr.
- Greg Bahnsen
- James Montgomery Boice
- D. A. Carson
- W. A. Criswell
- John Feinberg
- Norman Geisler
- Ralph Earle Jr.
- Robert Godfrey
- Wayne Grudem
- Stanley N. Gundry
- Howard Hendricks
- D. James Kennedy
- Hal Lindsey
- Josh McDowell
- Jack MacArthur
- John F. MacArthur
- Allan MacRae
- J. P. Moreland
- Harold Ockenga
- J. I. Packer
- Luis Palau
- Paige Patterson
- Paul Pressler
- Robert Preus
- Francis Schaeffer
- Frank Schaeffer
- R. C. Sproul
- Marten Woudstra

== Reception ==
=== Criticism within evangelicalism ===
Old Testament theologian Peter Enns was greatly critical of the statement, saying, "Much of what burdens CSBI can be summed up as failing to reflect adequately on the nature of inspiration. The irony is clear. In their efforts to protect biblical authority, the framers define inspiration in a way that does not account well for how the Bible actually behaves."

Theologian Roger Olson recognised the political elements of the statements: "In all such efforts, projects, there is a perceived 'enemy' to be excluded." He adds: "When I look at the Chicago Statement on inerrancy and its signatories I believe it is more a political (in the broad sense) statement than a clear, precise, statement of perfect agreement among the signatories. In other words, what was really going on there... was driven by a shared concern to establish and patrol 'evangelical boundaries'."

=== Criticism of position on evolution ===
The Hermeneutics statement specifically came out against what it called "evolutionism":

- Article 19: "WE DENY that Scripture should be required to fit alien preunderstandings, inconsistent with itself, such as naturalism, evolutionism, scientism, secular humanism, and relativism."
- Article 22: "WE DENY that the teachings of Genesis 1-11 are mythical and that scientific hypotheses about earth history or the origin of humanity may be invoked to overthrow what Scripture teaches about creation."

The official commentary was forthright: "...a recognition of the factual nature of the account of the creation of the universe, all living things, the special creation of man, the Fall, and the Flood. These accounts are all factual, that is, they are about space-time events which actually happened as reported in the book of Genesis. ... Likewise, the use of the term 'creation' was meant to exclude the belief in macro-evolution, whether of the atheistic or theistic varieties.

The Biblical Application statement was also forthright in its denial of evolutionary thought: "Mainstream Protestantism ... provides a cautionary tale in this regard, for it has erred in a radical way by acquiring the habit of regularly relativizing biblical teaching to current secular fashion, whether rationalist, historicist, evolutionist, existentialist, Marxist, or whatever. But this is to forget how sin darkens and misdirects the human intellect..." and "for our secular society insists on judging itself, not by the revelation of the Creator that the Bible sets forth, but by evolutionary, permissive, materialistic, hedonistic, and this-worldly yardsticks...".

The statements' rejection of the scientific consensus about evolution has been strongly criticised by thinkers within the evangelical community itself, such as Richard Wright: "the important Chicago Inerrancy statements simply miss the target when addressing the relationship between science and the bible. ... [D]iscussions on science and the bible touch upon very important and profound theological issues, which require some amount of expounding, but none was given. The statements supply a surprisingly large number of articles and other declarations that insist that all the bible is literal, historical truth, including Genesis. Those articles, combined with Geisler's commentary to those articles, reveal contradictions, inconsistencies, and a healthy dose of lazy theology."
