= Diana Mercer =

Divorce mediator (born 1964)

- Born: March 10, 1964 (age 62)
- Occupations: Attorney, mediator
- Known for: Divorce mediation

Diana L. Mercer (born March 10, 1964) is an American attorney and divorce mediator. She is the founder of Peace Talks Mediation Services in Los Angeles, California.

== Career ==
Mercer earned a Bachelor of Arts degree in 1985 and a Juris Doctor in 1988, both from Indiana University. In 1993, she became a founding partner at Noyes & Mercer, P.C., a family law litigation and mediation practice in New Haven, Connecticut. In 2000, Mercer left the firm to establish Peace Talks Mediation Services, Inc., in Los Angeles, which pairs attorneys and mental health professionals as co-mediators during divorce resolution sessions. She has since retired from practice.

Mercer holds bar admissions in California, New York, Connecticut, Pennsylvania, and before the Supreme Court of the United States. In 2006, she received a Make Mine a $Million Business Award from Count Me In.

== Books and publications ==
Mercer co-authored two books on family conflict resolution:

- Your Divorce Advisor: A Lawyer and a Psychologist Guide You Through the Legal and Emotional Landscape of Divorce, with Marsha Kline Pruett (Fireside, 2001).
- Making Divorce Work: 8 Essential Keys to Resolving Conflict and Rebuilding Your Life, with Katie Jane Wennechuk (Tarcher, 2010).

Your Divorce Advisor was reviewed in the Daily Journal and in Family Advocate, a publication of the American Bar Association's Family Law Section. Making Divorce Work received a favorable review in Library Journal.

She has also written articles for professional and trade publications, including:

- "A Therapist's Guide to Understanding Mediation and Child Custody Evaluations", The Therapist (July/August 2003).
