= J. P. Moreland =

American theologian

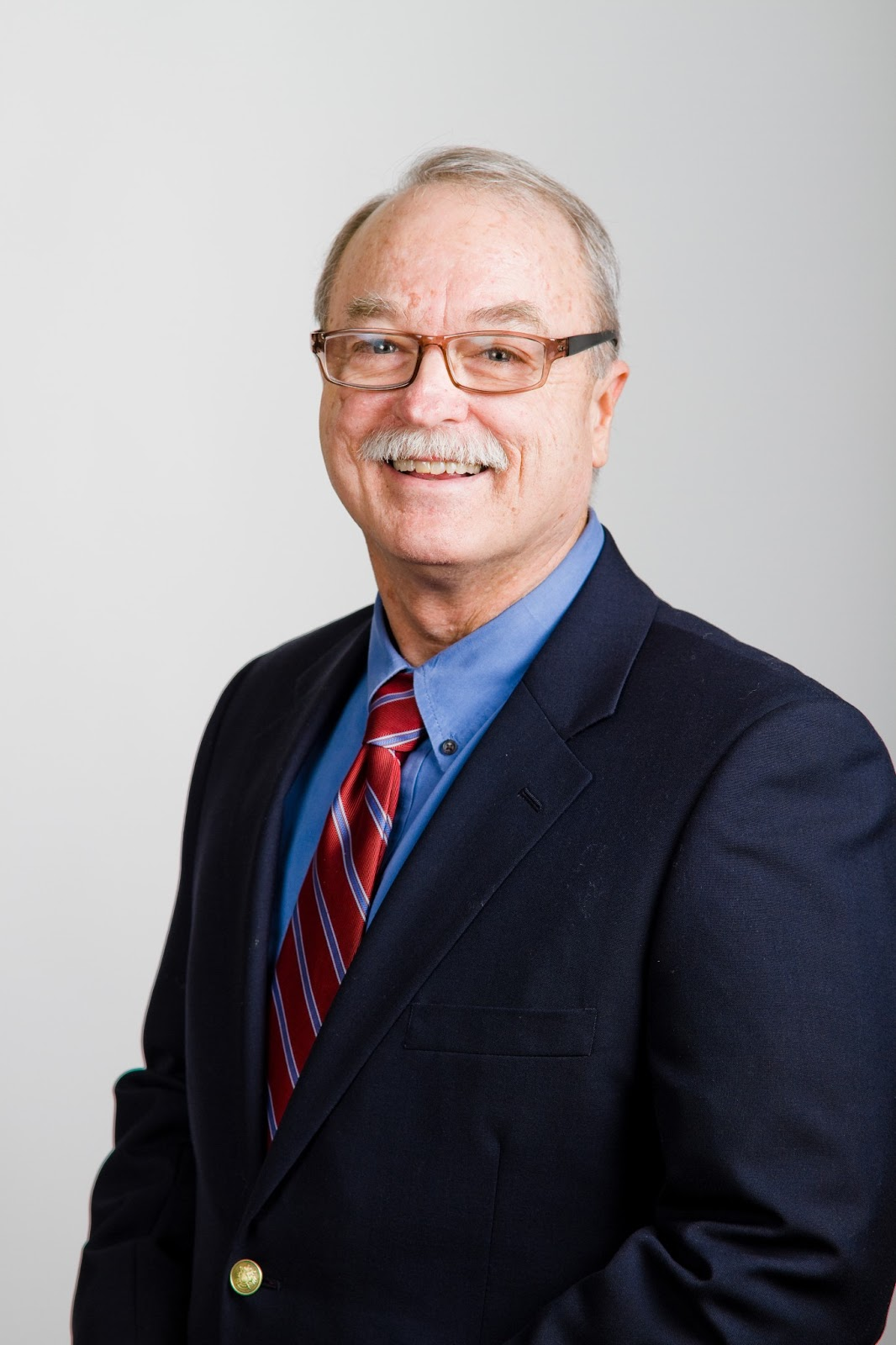
- Born: March 9, 1948 (age 78)
- Spouse: Hope Moreland

Education
- Education: University of Missouri (BA); University of California, Riverside (MA); Dallas Theological Seminary (ThM); University of Southern California (PhD)

Philosophical work
- Era: 20th-century philosophy
- Region: Western philosophy
- School: Analytic philosophy
- Institutions: Biola University
- Main interests: Ontology, epistemology, philosophy of science, philosophy of mind, theology
- Website: www.jpmoreland.com

James Porter Moreland (born March 9, 1948) is an American philosopher, theologian, and Christian apologist. He is a Distinguished Professor of Philosophy at the Talbot School of Theology at Biola University in La Mirada, California.

Moreland specializes in metaphysics, philosophy of mind, and Christian philosophy, having had his work published in journals such as Metaphilosophy and the American Philosophical Quarterly. He has also had his work published by presses such as Intervarsity Press, NavPress, Zondervan, Oxford University Press, Routledge, Rutgers University Press, and Prometheus.

In 2018, he edited The Blackwell Companion to Substance Dualism.

== Early life and education ==
Moreland earned his undergraduate degree from the University of Missouri, an M.A. in philosophy with highest honors from the University of California, Riverside, and a Th.M. in theology from Dallas Theological Seminary. In 1985, he earned his Ph.D. in philosophy from the University of Southern California. His dissertation was titled, Universals and the Qualities of Things: A defense of Realism. His dissertation advisor was Dallas Willard. Moreland is married to Hope and together they have two children and four grandchildren.

== Career ==
Moreland teaches at the Talbot School of Theology at Biola University in La Mirada, California. He is a member of the Board of Advisors for the Center on Culture and Civil Society at the Independent Institute. He served for eight years as a bioethicist for Personal Care Nursing Homes, Inc. in Baltimore, Maryland. Moreland is a fellow of the Discovery Institute.

He has debated Clancy Martin over the existence of God as well as Canadian philosopher Kai Nielsen and Eddie Tabash on whether the supernatural exists. He has been a frequent guest on the PBS television series Closer to Truth.

== Views ==
Moreland has defended Thomistic substance dualism, libertarian free will, and life after death. Moreland has defended the existence of angels and demons, arguing that he knows they exist due to both Christian doctrine and personal experience. He is an old earth creationist who is a critic of fideism.

In 1978, Moreland signed the Chicago Statement on Biblical Inerrancy. In 2017, he signed the Nashville Statement.

In 2022, Moreland co-authored a paper with American theologian Dr. Tim Stratton, entitled "An Explanation and Defense of the Free-Thinking Argument". The paper argued that determinism could not account for "epistemic responsibility", whereby people are held accountable for what they do or not believe, and further argued that God is a "deity of deception", if determinism is true. The paper has come under scrutiny, though it has also found some intellectual support.

== Awards and honors ==
- Awarded fellowship for Ph.D. in nuclear chemistry, University of Colorado (1970).
- Rollin Thomas Chafer Award in Christian Apologetics, Dallas Seminary (1978–79).
- Academic Excellence Award, International School of Theology (1982–83).
- Winner of the Outstanding Professor of the Year Award, Lakin School of Religion, Liberty University, (1988–89).
- Elected as a Member of the executive committee for the Society of Christian Philosophers, (1997–99).
- Fellow of the Center for the Renewal of Science & Culture, Discovery Institute. (2000–present)
- Winner of the Robert Fischer Faculty Member of the Year Award, Biola University,(1998–99).
- Member of the advisory board for Philosophia Christi, (1999 to 2003).
- Member of the executive committee for the Evangelical Philosophical Society (1999-2003, 2006 to present).
- Fellow of the Wilberforce Forum, 2001 to present.

== Works ==
Moreland has authored or edited numerous publications, including:

=== Books ===
- Moreland, J. P. (1987). Scaling the Secular City: A Defense of Christianity. Grand Rapids, MI: Baker Book House. ISBN 9780801062223. OCLC 16807427.
- ——— (1989). Christianity and the Nature of Science: A Philosophical Examination. Grand Rapids, MI: Baker Book House. ISBN 9780801062490. OCLC 19556070.
- ———; Geisler, Norman (1990). The Life and Death Debate: Moral Issues of Our Time. Contributions in Philosophy. Vol. 43. New York: Greenwood Press. ISBN 9780313275562. OCLC 21592792.
- ———; Nielsen, Kai (1990). Does God Exist?: The Debate Between Atheists and Theists. Nashville, TN: Thomas Nelson.
- ——— (1997). Love Your God With All Your Mind: The Role of Reason in the Life of the Soul. Colorado Springs, CO: NavPress. ISBN 9781576830161. OCLC 36327354.
- ———; Rae, Scott B. (2000). Body and Soul: Human Nature and the Crisis of Ethics. Downers Grove, IL: InterVarsity Press. ISBN 9780830815777. OCLC 43245896.
- ———; Craig, William Lane (2003). Philosophical Foundations for a Christian Worldview. Downers Grove, IL: InterVarsity Press. ISBN 9780830826940. OCLC 51093246.
- ———; DeWeese, Garret J. (2005). Philosophy Made Slightly Less Difficult: A Beginner's Guide to Life's Biggest Questions. Downers Grove, IL: InterVarsity Press. ISBN 9780830827664. OCLC 60188295.
- ——— (2007). Kingdom Triangle: Recover the Christian Mind, Renovate the Soul, Restore the Spirit's Power. Grand Rapids, MI: Zondervan. ISBN 9780310590002. OCLC 993636161.
- ——— (2009). Consciousness and the Existence of God. Routledge Studies in the Philosophy of Religion. New York: Routledge. ISBN 9780203929339. OCLC 229867243.
- ——— (2009). The Recalcitrant Imago Dei: human persons and the failure of naturalism. London: SCM Press. ISBN 9780334042150. OCLC 695838789.
- ——— (2009). The God Question: An Invitation to a Life of Meaning. ConversantLife.com Series. Eugene, OR: Harvest House. ISBN 9780736924887.

=== Edited by ===
- ———, ed. (1994). The Creation Hypothesis: Scientific Evidence for An Intelligent Designer. Downers Grove, IL: InterVarsity Press. ISBN 9780830816989. OCLC 29478326.
- ———; Craig, William Lane, eds. (2000). Naturalism: A Critical Analysis. Routledge Studies in Twentieth Century Philosophy. London & New York: Routledge. ISBN 9780203186138. OCLC 252705993.
- ———; Sweis, Khaldoun A.; Meister, Chad V., eds. (2013). Debating Christian Theism. Oxford: Oxford University Press. ISBN 9780199981434. OCLC 854973516.

=== Chapters ===
- ——— (1994). "Theistic science & methodological naturalism". In ——— (ed.). The Creation Hypothesis: Scientific Evidence for An Intelligent Designer. Downers Grove, IL: InterVarsity Press. pp. 41–66. ISBN 9780830816989. OCLC 29478326.

== See also ==
- American philosophy
- List of American philosophers
