= Southern Evangelical Seminary =

Christian college in North Carolina, U.S.

- Type: Private
- Established: 1992
- Affiliations: Non-denominational
- Academic affiliations: TRACS
- President: Judge Phil Ginn
- Location: Charlotte, North Carolina, United States; 35.04215°N 80.86178°W
- Website: www.ses.edu

Southern Evangelical Seminary is a Christian college and seminary that started in Charlotte, North Carolina in 1992, United States. In April of 2025, the schools moved to Rock Hill, SC.

== History ==
The seminary was established in 1992 by Norman Geisler and Ross Rhoads. The college, Southern Evangelical Bible College (SEBC), was established in 2004. SES has also been a member organization of the Evangelical Council for Financial Accountability since 1999.

Southern Evangelical Seminary is notable for the large number of faculty, students, and alumni who have converted to Roman Catholicism, partly through the emphasis placed on the work of Thomas Aquinas. A collection of these conversion testimonies, Evangelical Exodus: Evangelical Seminarians and Their Paths to Rome, was published by Ignatius Press in 2016.

== Seminary presidents ==
1999 - 2006 Norman Geisler
2006 - 2011 Alex McFarland
2011 - 2013 Bob Westra
2013 - 2021 Richard Land
2021–Present Judge Phil Ginn

== Faculty ==
SES (& SEBC) faculty includes Frank Turek and Hugh Ross.
