= Ross Rhoads =

American pastor (1932–2017)

Ross Rhoads (June 20, 1932 – May 24, 2017) was an American megachurch pastor who served at Charlotte's Calvary Church based in Charlotte, North Carolina from 1973 to 1995. He had a wife, with whom he had three children.

Rhoads died on May 24, 2017.
