= National Christian Association =

American organization (1868–1983)

National Christian Association (acronym, NCA; also known as The National Association of Christians Opposed to Secret Societies; 1868–1983) was an American organization opposed to secret societies. Headquartered in Chicago, Illinois, it consisted mostly of Protestant ministers of various denominations. It was the only society in the U.S. which has for its avowed object to "expose, withstand, and remove secret societies." It was organized in 1868, soon after the close of the Civil War, when such Protestant leaders as Jonathan Blanchard, Philo Carpenter, Joseph Goodwin (J.G.) Terrill, Ezra A. Cook, Alexander McLeod Milligan, D. McDill, and others saw with alarm that "the convicted enemy of State and Church was creeping back into favor and power."

== Precursor ==
For a while, it had been supposed that the revelations of 1826-1832 had destroyed the influence of Freemasonry and secret societies generally in the U.S. But during the Civil War, lodge agents followed the camps of soldiers and initiated a multitude of young men, who were assured that if they would be captured by the enemy, the grip and sign would secure favors, if not liberty for them. When the war ended, many "true patriots" asked: What shall be done in view of the secretism that has come upon the land like a flood? The Free Methodists suggested the establishment of a non-sectarian, inter-denominational, and national association, which should furnish a rallying point for all Christians who had come to understand and recognize these foes of our civil and religious liberties.

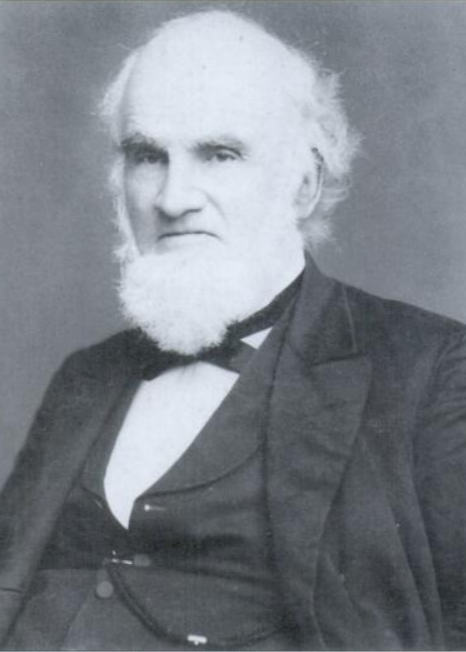
Jonathan Blanchard

A group of Christian men called a convention to meet in the City Hall, Aurora, Illinois, in October 1867. The attendance was large and enthusiastic. President Jonathan Blanchard was made chairman, and delivered the principal address. Speeches were also made by the Rev. I. A. Hart, a seceding Mason, and others.

== Establishment ==
As a result of the 1867 convention, a national meeting was held at Pittsburgh, Pennsylvania, in May 1868, and representatives of seventeen denominations were enrolled. At this time "The National Association of Christians Opposed to Secret Societies" was formed as a nonsectarian association, which would furnish "a rallying-point for all Christians who had come to understand and recognize this great antichrist of our age." Until 1874, the Association had no legal existence.

== Incorporation ==
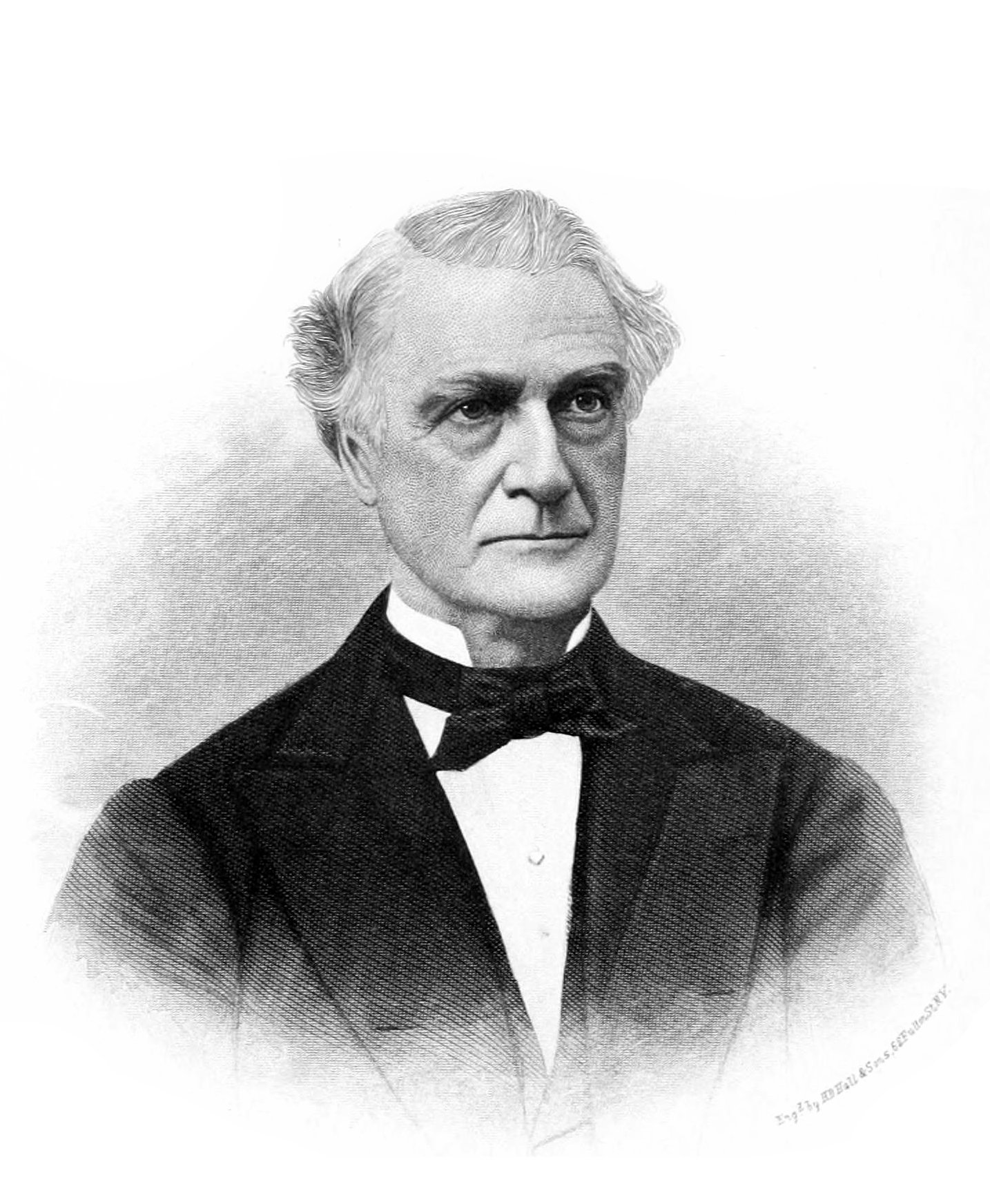
Philo Carpenter

In 1874, the body incorporated as "The National Christian Association," articles having been filed with the Secretary of State of Illinois and a certificate of incorporation issued. Hon. Philo Carpenter, of Chicago, one of the prime movers in this opposition to the lodge, who at that time had given more money to aid in the work than any other man, offered to the association a home, "so that its work of removing the obstacles to the coming kingdom of God might go on." Annual meetings were held in Chicago, Cincinnati, O., Worcester, Mass., Oberlin, O., Syracuse, N. Y., and in many other places; in 1921 in Grand Rapids, Mich., and in 1922 in Omaha, Nebr.

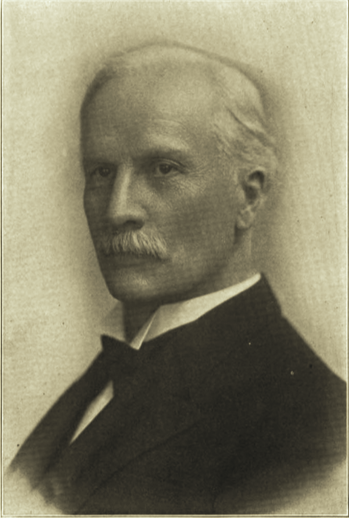
Charles A. Blanchard

Charles A. Blanchard, president of Wheaton College (d. 1925), was the first agent and lecturer, 1870–72. He was succeeded by Rev. J. P. Stoddard as secretary and general agent. William I. Phillips served as general secretary and treasurer for a quarter of a century. By 1927, Rev. John F. Heemstra, Holland, Michigan, was the president of the association. He had been preceded by President Blanchard, Bishop D. S. Warner, and the Rev. J. Groen. Lecturers included the Rev. W. B. Stoddard, Eastern secretary; Prof. Silas W. Bond, Western secretary; the Rev. Francis J. Davidson, Southern agent; and Mrs. Lizzie Woods Robertson, representative at large.

Five members of the board of directors of the NCA responded to calls for lectures whenever possible.

Among the denominations which were committed by vote of their legislative assemblies or by constitution to the exclusion of Freemasons from church-membership were the United Presbyterians, United Brethren in Christ, Seventh-day Adventists, Christian Reformed Church, Primitive Baptists, Seventh-day Baptists, Scandinavian Baptists, Church of the United Brethren in Christ, Friends, Norwegian Lutherans, Danish Lutherans, Swedish Lutherans, German Lutherans, Church of God in Christ, Mennonites, Moravians, Plymouth Brethren, Associate Presbyterians, Reformed Presbyterians, Free Methodists, Wesleyan Methodists, Hollanders of the Reformed and the Christian Reformed churches, Pentecostal Church of the Nazarene, Christian and Missionary Alliance, and various independent churches, such as the Moody Church, Chicago; Wheaton College Church (Cong.), Wheaton, Illinois.

== Closure ==
The organization became defunct in 1983. Some of the association's papers are held by the Wheaton College Archives.

== Publications ==
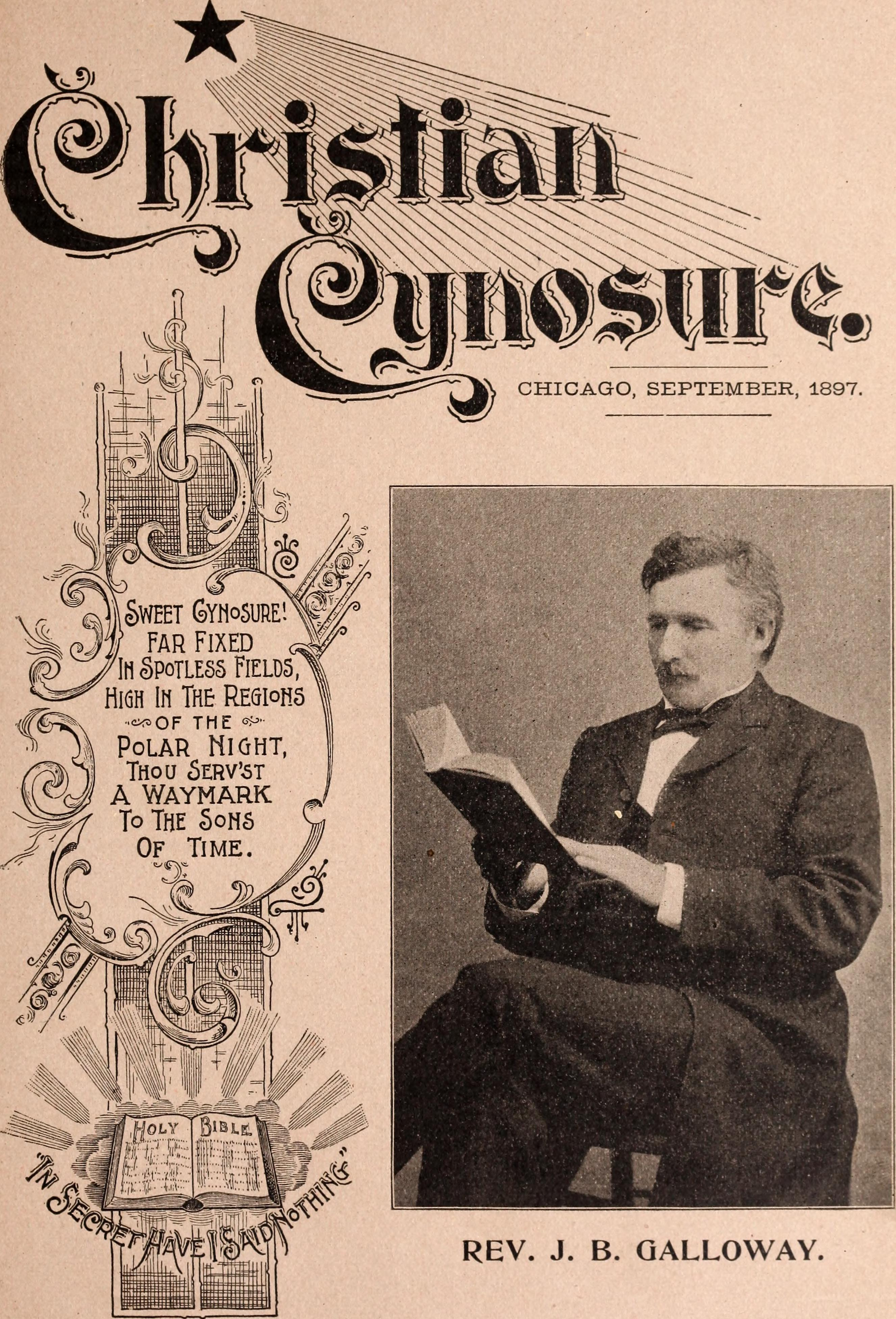
Christian Cynosure (1897)

The magazine, Christian Cynosure, was started in 1868 and was the official organ. Initially a fortnightly, in 1871 it became a 16-page weekly, with many departments in addition to the one on secret societies. In 1897, it became a 32-page monthly, with only one general object, viz., to give the news of this special movement, and the arguments by which its position was maintained.

As a result of the movement inaugurated by the association, books were printed and a large number of tracts issued, and by the aid of thousands of coworkers, millions were distributed in the U.S. and foreign countries. Modern Secret Societies, a book of 300 pages, was put upon the market in 1903. Six editions of it were printed. The NCA also kept in stock and for sale books and pamphlets dealing with some sixteen different lodges-Masons, Odd Fellows, Knights of Pythias, and others. It also had 50 other publications, in the form of books and pamphlets, discussing the principles of "Secretism." Catalogues of either of the above classes of literature were sent upon application. All of the publications of the Association were laid under contribution by Arthur Preuss, the compiler of A Dictionary of Secret and Other Societies.
