= Edman Memorial Chapel =

Coordinates: 41.86991°N 88.10065°W

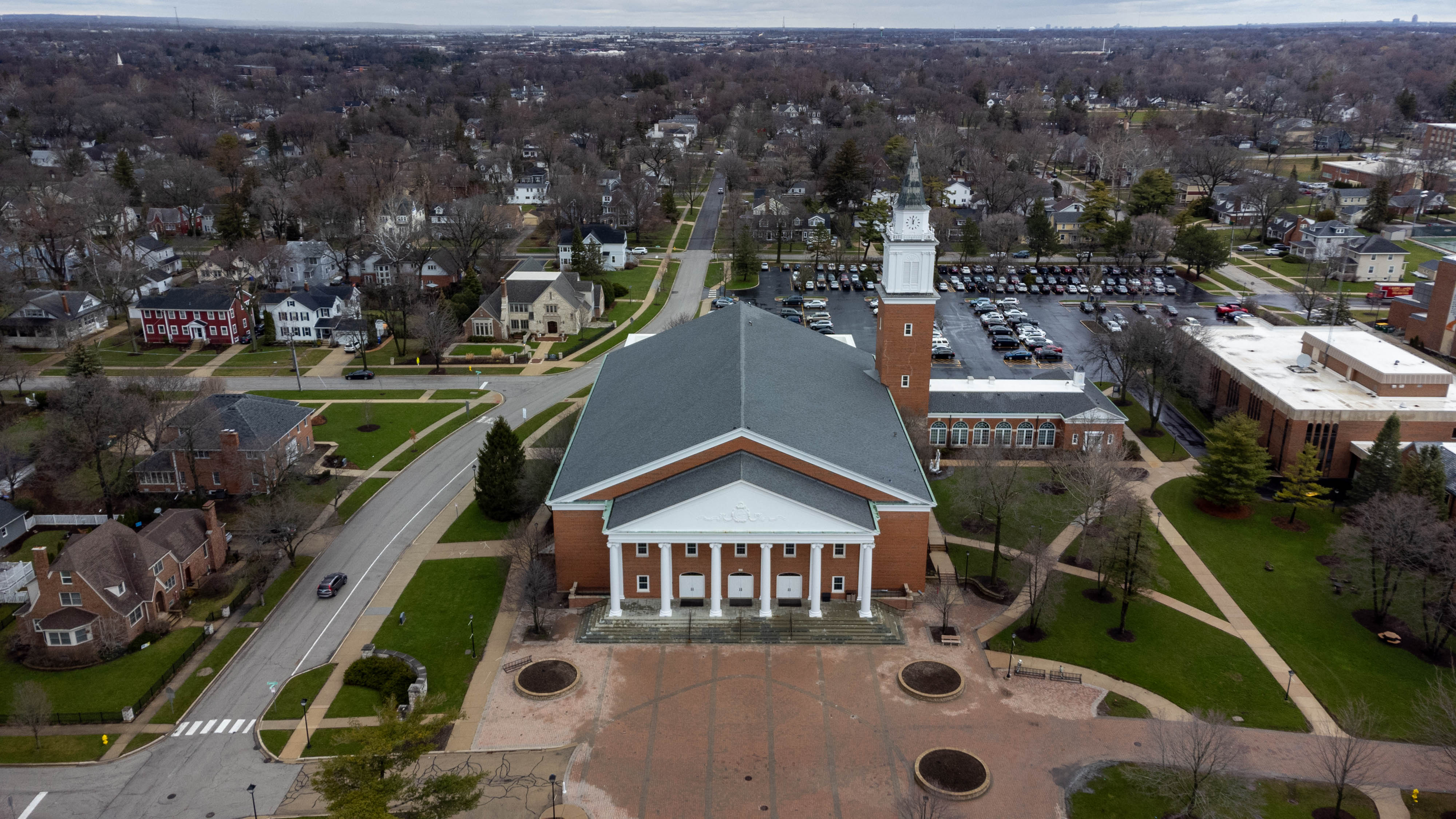
Edman Memorial Chapel at Wheaton College

Edman Memorial Chapel is an auditorium facility on the campus of Wheaton College in Wheaton, Illinois. Its primary purpose is as a chapel, though it is also used for numerous concerts and other large events. The auditorium itself seats almost 2400; the facility also includes support space for the auditorium, separate event spaces in its East Wing, and instructional space for the College's music program. The facility is located at the northeast corner of Washington and Franklin Streets in Wheaton; its tower is visible for miles around.

== History ==
The chapel was part of Wheaton College's expansion program for its centennial year of 1960. At the time, the College had two spaces for large audiences, but neither could accommodate the audiences for many all-campus events. After two rejected proposals, the plans for a new chapel-auditorium drawn by the firm of J. Emil Anderson and Son were finally chosen in the summer of 1959. Ground was broken at Commencement 1959.

The first regular morning chapel service was held in the new chapel-auditorium on May 16, 1960. At that time, the entire student body, both undergraduate and graduate, as well as the entire faculty and staff, could be comfortably accommodated in the auditorium, with room to spare for friends and visitors from the community. A month later, at Commencement, the building was named in honor of Wheaton's then-president, Dr. V. Raymond Edman.

== Organ ==
In 2001, a four-manual, 50-stop, 70-rank Casavant Tracker Pipe Organ was installed. The instrument is the largest of its type in the area.

== Usage ==
During the fall and spring semesters, the auditorium is the location of regular undergraduate chapel, every Monday, Wednesday, and Friday morning at 10:35. The auditorium is also used for major Conservatory concerts and the Wheaton College Artist Series, a series of professional performing artists. Commencement exercises, major lectures, and many other special large events are held in the auditorium as well.

Uses outside of Wheaton College programming include an annual concert series presented by the Chicago Symphony Orchestra.

== 2009 renovation ==
As part of the 2005-2010 Promise of Wheaton Campaign, an addition was constructed at the back of Edman Chapel to provide instructional space for the Wheaton College Conservatory of Music, which had outgrown its quarters in nearby McAlister Hall and Pierce Chapel. This addition includes a large rehearsal hall for the band and orchestra, named for alumni John Nelson and his wife, Anita. The addition also included instructional space for harp, percussion, and string bass.

== See also ==
- Wheaton College Men's Glee Club
