= Ellen R. Thompson =

Ellen Reed Thompson (October 16, 1928 – September 14, 2014) was an American composer and music educator who taught at Wheaton College Conservatory of Music for many years.

Thompson was born in Rutherford, New Jersey to Norman and Isabelle Mauger Thompson. She was the fourth of six children. She earned her undergraduate music degree at Houghton College, a Master of Arts degree in music education at Columbia University Teachers College, and a Masters of Music degree from the American Conservatory of Music. Her teachers included Lillian Powers-Wadsworth and Stella Roberts.

Thompson taught piano and music theory at Wheaton College Conservatory of Music for 39 years. She chaired the theory department for 25 years, and was voted Senior Teacher of the Year in 1976. She directed the Concert Choir and the Women's Glee Club, and belonged to the Central Midwest Theory Conference and the College Music Society.

While teaching at Wheaton, Thompson directed the youth and chancel choirs at College Church, which commissioned her to compose an oratorio in 1978 and a hymn in 1993. From 1960 to 1984, she also worked as a composer, arranger, and editor for Scripture Press, which was acquired by David C. Cook in 1995. Her papers are archived at Wheaton College Library.

Thompson's works were published by Kjos-West and Scripture Press (today David C. Cook). Her publications include:

== Book ==
- Teaching and Understanding Contemporary Piano Music

== Hymn ==
- "Soli Deo Gloria"!

== Oratorio ==
- Temple of God
