= Ellen Thompson =

Ellen Thompson may refer to:

- Ellen Powell Thompson, American naturalist and botanist
- Ellen R. Thompson, American composer and music educator
- Elaine Thompson-Herah, née Thompson, Jamaican sprinter

== See also ==
- Ellen Mosley-Thompson, glaciologist and climatologist
