= Charles Blanchard =

Charles Blanchard may refer to:

- Charles Blanchard, UFC fighter in The Ultimate Fighter: Team Liddell vs. Team Ortiz
- Charles A. Blanchard (academic administrator) (1848–1925), second President of Wheaton College
- Émile Blanchard (Charles Émile Blanchard, 1819–1900), French biologist
- Charles V. Blanchard (1866–1939), American politician
- Charles A. Blanchard (lawyer) (born 1959), U.S. Air Force general counsel
- Charles D. Blanchard, politician, see Members of the South Dakota State Senate
