= Armerding =

Armerding is a surname. Notable people with the surname include:

- Hudson Armerding (1918–2009), American university president
- Jake Armerding, American folk musician and multi-instrumentalist
