= Jonathan Blanchard (abolitionist) =

American pastor and educator (1811–1892)

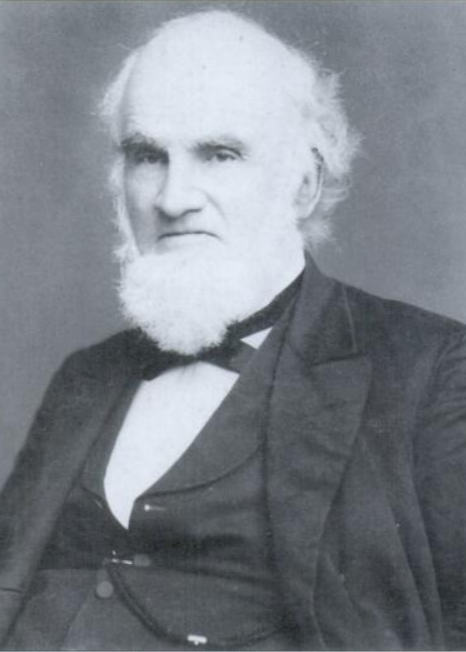
- Born: January 19, 1811; Rockingham, Vermont, U.S.
- Died: May 14, 1892 (aged 81); Wheaton, Illinois, U.S.
- Education: Middlebury College; Lane Seminary
- Occupations: Abolitionist, College President, Editor
- Political party: Liberty, Free Soil, Anti-Masonic
- Spouse: Mary Avery Bent
- Children: 12, including Charles A. Blanchard

Jonathan Blanchard (January 19, 1811 – May 14, 1892) was an American pastor, educator, social reformer, and abolitionist. Born in Vermont, Blanchard attended Middlebury College before accepting a teaching position in New York. In 1834, he left to study at Andover Theological Seminary, but departed in 1836 after the college rejected agents from the American Anti-Slavery Society. Blanchard joined the group as one of Theodore Dwight Weld's "seventy" and preached in favor of abolition in southern Pennsylvania.

Blanchard graduated from Lane Seminary in 1838 and was soon ordained to preach at Sixth Presbyterian Church in Cincinnati, Ohio. There, he helped publish abolitionist newspaper The Philanthropist and represented Ohio at the 1843 World Anti-Slavery Convention. In 1845, he was named president of Knox College in Illinois, but was forced out thirteen years later. Blanchard is credited with founding Wheaton College in 1860, where he presided until 1882.

Following the Civil War, Blanchard focused on fighting secret societies through his National Christian Association (NCA). He was a leader in the resurrected Anti-Masonic Party and once campaigned for its Presidential nomination. Along with his son Charles Albert, who succeeded him as Wheaton College president, he is the namesake of the college's Blanchard Hall.

== Early life ==
Jonathan Blanchard was born in Rockingham, Vermont on January 19, 1811. He was the eleventh of fifteen children born to Polly (Lovell) and Jonathan Blanchard, Sr. When he was three years old, he heard his brother discuss the recent Battle of Plattsburgh, an engagement of the War of 1812. Blanchard later credited this encounter as an influential moment in the development of his pacifist views. As a child, Blanchard attended public schools and helped on the family farm. When he was fourteen, he took his first job teaching a school. Like his brothers, Blanchard opposed the consumption of alcohol. He published his first article advocating temperance in 1825.

After preparatory studies at Chester Academy in Chester, Vermont, Blanchard matriculated at Middlebury College in 1828. Upon graduation in 1831, he was named preceptor of Plattsburg Academy in Plattsburgh, New York. He taught for two years but found the work dissatisfying. Blanchard first supported abolitionism in 1834, believing slavery to be inconsistent with Biblical teachings. He then enrolled at the Andover Theological Seminary in Andover, Massachusetts. While there, the school denounced the American Anti-Slavery Society (AASS) and demanded that students reject abolitionist views. Blanchard left the school in 1836 to join the society, which assigned him to preach in southern Pennsylvania as one of Theodore Dwight Weld's "seventy". Blanchard was stoned in the streets by citizens in Harrisburg, Pennsylvania, in 1837. Nonetheless, he was considered one of the most effective agents of the AASS and is credited with converting Thaddeus Stevens to the abolitionist cause.

The next year, Blanchard moved to Cincinnati, Ohio, to attend Lane Seminary, where he graduated in 1838. He assisted with the publication of abolitionist newspaper The Philanthropist until it was forced to close in the aftermath of the Cincinnati riots of 1836. Blanchard was ordained in that city to preach at Sixth Presbyterian Church, a New School congregation. The church provided Blanchard with an opportunity to spread abolitionist ideals without eschewing mainstream Christianity. Calvin Ellis Stowe and Lyman Beecher attended Blanchard's ordination; Blanchard's wife was a close friend of Beecher's daughter Harriet.

After delivering a rousing commencement address at Oberlin College in 1839, the school offered Blanchard a professorship, but he declined. In 1841, Blanchard founded the Presbyterian of the West, later known as the Herald and Presbyter, a radical Presbyterian weekly journal. He represented the Ohio State Anti-Slavery Society as a delegate to the 1843 World Anti-Slavery Convention in London, England, and was elected its American vice president. In early October 1845, in Cincinnati, Ohio, Blanchard debated the morality of slavery with fellow Presbyterian minister Nathan Lewis Rice (December 29, 1807 - June 11, 1877). This debate was recorded in full, and later published as A Debate on Slavery Held in the City of Cincinnati (Cincinnati: William H. Moore & Co., 1846). Blanchard's first opposition to Freemasonry came in 1845, when he condemned a Covington, Kentucky, lodge that refused aid to a widow of a long-time member. A mob of over fifty men attacked him over the article. The next Sunday, Blanchard preached against secret societies, a position that he would hold for the rest of his life.

== College presidencies ==
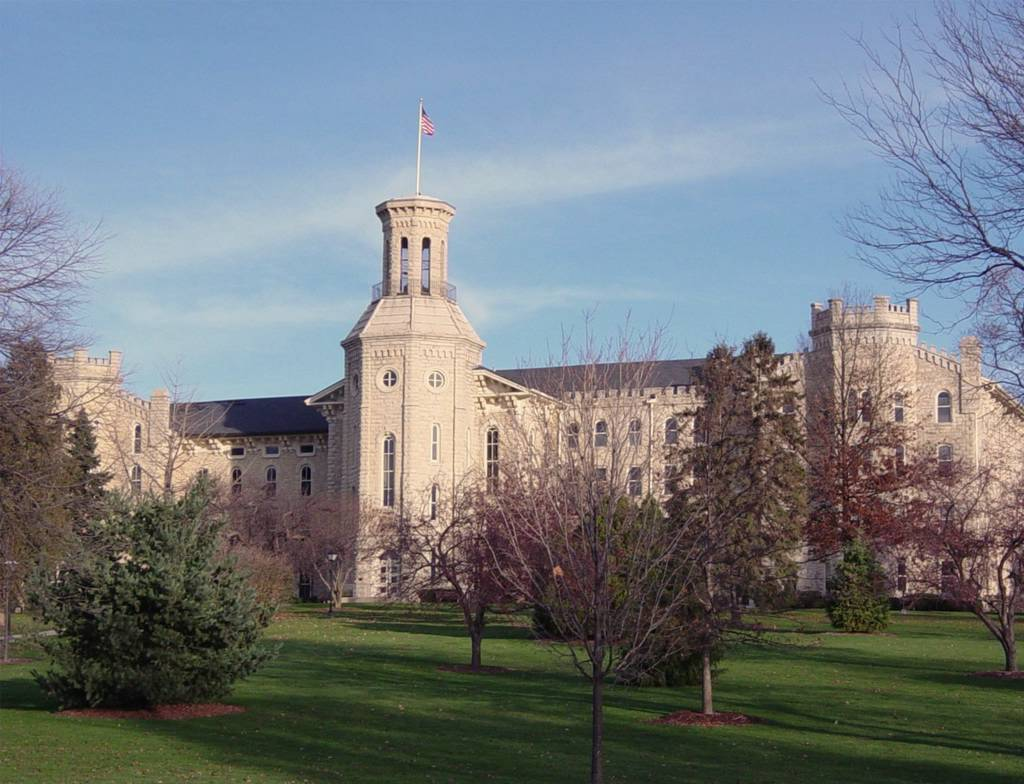
Blanchard Hall, Wheaton College

Later in 1845, he accepted the presidency of Knox College in Galesburg, Illinois. The school had recently been opened by anti-slavery social reformers who sought a Christian utopia. The school was deeply in debt but, thanks to donations by Charles E. Phelps and J. P. Williston, Blanchard was able to secure financial stability. The Old Main building, now recognized as a National Historic Landmark, was constructed during his tenure. When Senator Stephen A. Douglas assisted with the passage of the Fugitive Slave Act of 1850, Blanchard harshly criticized him in a newspaper article. He would do the same after Douglas' support for the Kansas–Nebraska Act. The two met in Knoxville, Illinois, on October 13, 1854 to publicly debate the issues. In 1855, Blanchard went on a lecture circuit of Kentucky with fellow abolitionists Cassius Marcellus Clay and John Gregg Fee.

Shortly after his arrival to Galesburg, Blanchard became associated with the Congregational church, leaving the Presbyterian church because of their uncertain stance on slavery. College founder George Washington Gale was instead a devout Presbyterian. Uncertainties surrounding the school's ties to either church led to controversy among the faculty. Furthermore, Blanchard supported the Liberty Party (later the Free Soil Party), a political threat to Gale's Whig Party. Blanchard served as a presidential elector for the Free Soilers in 1848. In 1857, the Knox College board of trust requested that both Blanchard and Gale resign their positions, and both agreed. However, the decision proved controversial, as local civic leaders such as Edward Beecher protested the ruling. A school committee then re-admitted Blanchard as president, who served until the board elected Harvey Curtis the next year.

Blanchard lectured in the region for the next two years. In 1860, Blanchard was named president of the Illinois Institute, a small college in Wheaton, Illinois, founded a few years earlier by Wesleyans. When Warren L. Wheaton donated his farmland to the college later that year, Blanchard renamed the school after him and it became known as Wheaton College. Under Blanchard's leadership, the school was remodeled after Oberlin College, a school that was open to all students and that taught both a classic curriculum and radical social ideals. Blanchard would allow African-American students at Wheaton College to board in his house. His anti-Masonry views prohibited the founding of fraternities or sororities on campus. Blanchard believed that morality and Christian beliefs were innately experienced by man; this put him in line with most Scottish Common Sense Realists. Blanchard saw Wheaton College "as an 'arsenal' and 'drill camp' for the hosts of righteousness in the moral warfare of the world . . . a means of training social activists . . . ." In 1861, Jonathan Blanchard organized College Church in Wheaton. The church first met on the campus of Wheaton College as "The First Church of Christ in Wheaton." Blanchard wanted the church to be known for its opposition to slavery, secret societies, and alcohol use.

After a spell of poor health, Blanchard traveled with his son to the Montana Territory in 1864, ostensibly to explore on behalf of the American Missionary Association. While there, he recommended that the society found the First Congregational Churches of Denver and Salt Lake City.

== After the Civil War ==
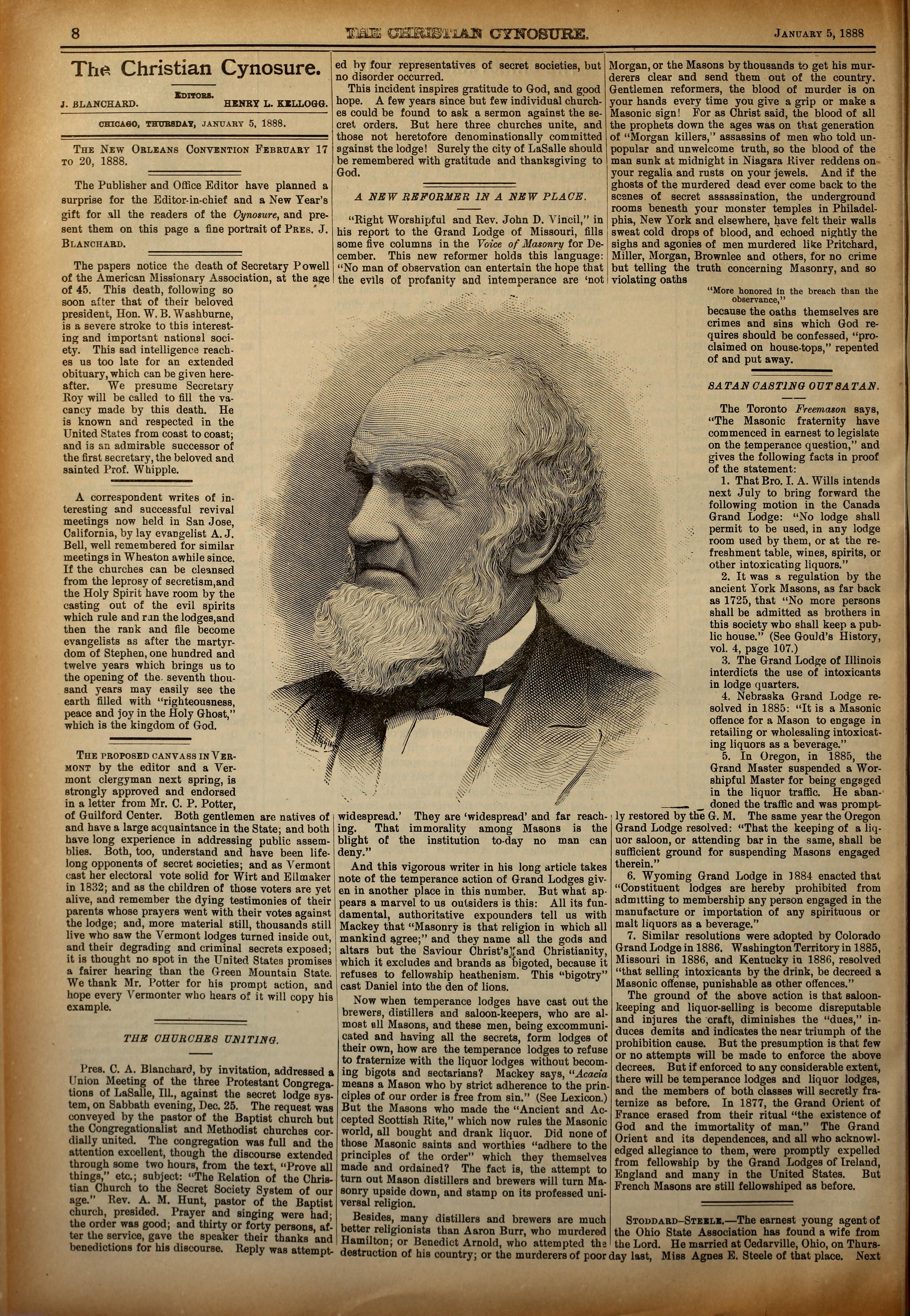
Portrait of Blanchard in Christian Cynosure (1887)

After the Civil War, during which the slaves were liberated, Blanchard turned his attention to fighting secret societies like the Freemasons. He co-founded the NCA in 1868 and edited its newspaper, the Christian Cynosure, until his death. In 1872, the NCA reorganized the Anti-Masonic Party, which had been dormant since its merge with the Whig Party in 1840. The platform of the anti-Masonic Party was very brief, and espoused Christianity, temperance, the abolition of secret societies, and a direct vote for President and Vice-President of the United States instead of an electoral college.

In 1884, Blanchard unsuccessfully sought the candidacy of the American Prohibition Party, the successor of the Anti-Masonic Party, for President of the United States. Jonathan Blanchard's son, Charles A. Blanchard, succeeded him as college president in 1882 and served Wheaton in that capacity until his death in 1925.

== Personal life ==
Blanchard married Mary Avery Bent on September 17, 1838. Bent left her family home of Middlebury, Vermont in 1835 for Pennsylvania, where she became principal of the Girls' High School in Harrisburg. She met Blanchard in that city when he was with the AASS. They had twelve children: Jonathan Edwards (died an infant), Mary Avery, William Walter (died an infant), Catherine Lucretia, Charles Albert, Williston (died a child), Nora Emily, Sonora Caroline, Julia Waters, Cyrus Louis, and Geraldine Cecilia. Blanchard died suddenly at his home in Wheaton on May 14, 1892. He had suffered through influenza the previous week. He was buried in Wheaton Cemetery. Wheaton's most recognizable and oldest building is Blanchard Hall, a limestone tower built as the Central College Building in 1853 and, subsequently, named in honor of the college's first two presidents.

Academic offices
Preceded by Hiram Huntington Kellogg Sr.	President of Knox College; 1845–1858	Succeeded by Harvey Curtis
New institution	President of Wheaton College; 1860–1882	Succeeded by Charles A. Blanchard
