= V. Raymond Edman =

American minister and author (1900–1967)

Victor Raymond Edman (May 9, 1900 – September 22, 1967) was an American minister and author who served as the fourth president of Wheaton College in Illinois from 1941 to 1965.

Edman was born in Chicago, Illinois, as one of six children to Swedish immigrants Anders and Alma Edman. He attended Columbia University, but left to serve in World War I in 1918–1919. After the War, Edman returned to attend the University of Illinois, Nyack College, and then Boston University where he received his B.A. Edman served as a missionary to the Quichua people in Ecuador from 1923 to 1927. While serving as a missionary, Edman married Edith Marie Olson in the fall of 1923, also an American. Together, they had four sons: Charles Raymond Edman, Victor Roland Edman, David Arthur Edman, and Norman Elner Edman. After four years as a missionary, Edman was forced to return to the United States after contracting a tropical disease. Upon his return, Edman became the pastor of the Gospel Tabernacle Christian & Missionary Alliance church in Worcester, Massachusetts.

In 1933 Edman graduated from Clark University with a M.A. and Ph.D. in international relations focusing on Latin American studies. Edman was chosen as an associate professor of history at Wheaton College in 1936 and then became the college's fourth president in 1940 serving until 1965. During this time he made various physical and financial improvements to the campus. In 1965 Edman became chancellor at Wheaton. He was also elected as the senior vice president of the Billy Graham Evangelistic Association. Edman was a friend and colleague of Billy Graham who was a student during Edman's presidency of Wheaton.

Edman spoke in various countries around the world and wrote nineteen books and various articles. On September 22, 1967, while delivering a chapel message titled, "In the Presence of the King," Edman suffered a fatal heart attack. He was buried at the Wheaton Cemetery, DuPage County, Illinois. The Edman Memorial Chapel at Wheaton College is named in his honor.

== Selected works ==
- The light in dark ages;: Eighteen centuries of missions from the giving of the great commission to the beginning of modern missions under William Carey (1949)
- Storms and Starlight (1951)
- Sweeter than honey;: A little book of deep and personal devotion to the Saviour (1956)
- He Leadeth Me - Lessons on God's Gracious Guidance in the Lives of Those Who Love and Trust Him (1959)
- They Found The Secret: Twenty transformed lives that reveal a touch of eternity (1960)
- But God!: Little Lessons of Large Importance Learned from the Holy Scriptures (1962)
- In step with God (1965)
- The Disciplines of Life (1948) On Christian discipleship.

Academic offices
Preceded by J. Oliver Buswell	President of Wheaton College; 1941–1965	Succeeded by Hudson Armerding
