= Wheaton Bible Church =

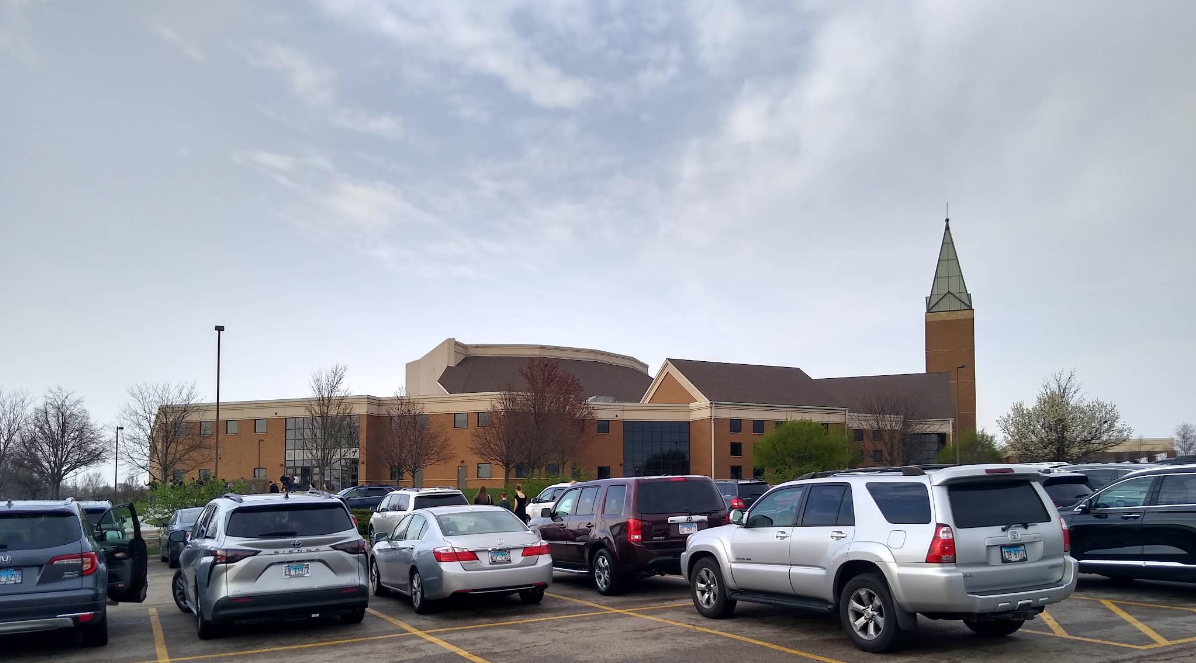
- Exterior view facing northwest towards the southwestern facade of the building
- Wheaton Bible Church
- 41°54′43″N 88°09′30″W
- Location: West Chicago, Illinois
- Country: United States
- Denomination: non-denominational Evangelicalism
- Website: www.wheatonbible.org

History
- Founded: 1929

Wheaton Bible Church is a non-denominational evangelical Christian megachurch located in West Chicago, Illinois, United States.

== History ==
The church was founded in the 1929. Rob Bugh became the senior pastor in 1994 and Hannibal Rodriguez became the senior pastor in 2021.

Until 2008, the church was located in Wheaton, Illinois, and retained the geographically oriented name when it relocated to a new campus.

Alongside First Presbyterian of Wheaton, Wheaton Bible Church split from College Church early in its history. The church holds $42,560,676 in assets and their annual budget for 2021 is $11,678,000.

== Ministries ==
Locally, the church's Puente del Pueblo outreach is the largest social service provider in West Chicago, with offices in the Timber Lake and Main Park apartments offering case management services for families, adult literacy programming, summer programs, and after school programming for children and youth. In addition, the church actively supports hunger ministries, partners with World Relief in refugee resettlement, and hosts an annual Carefest which involves thousands of volunteer service hours at local schools, individual homes, local ministry partners, and other not-for-profits.

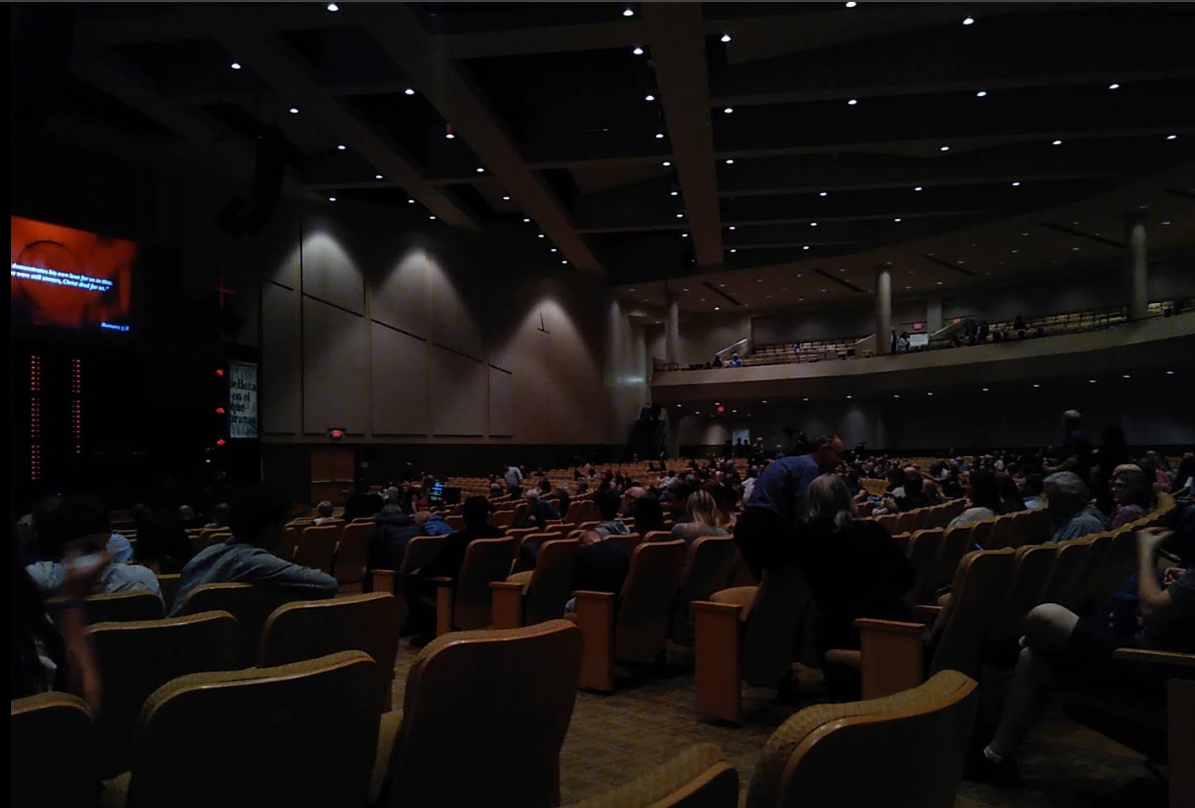
Good Friday service 2025 at Wheaton Bible

It has a large and active ministry to Hispanic residents of the region, with a full offering of Spanish worship services and other common church programs offered by Spanish-speaking ministers. Additionally, the church has partnered with World Relief to provide accommodation and care for Iraqi refugees.
