= Christian Cynosure =

American newspaper (1868–1983)

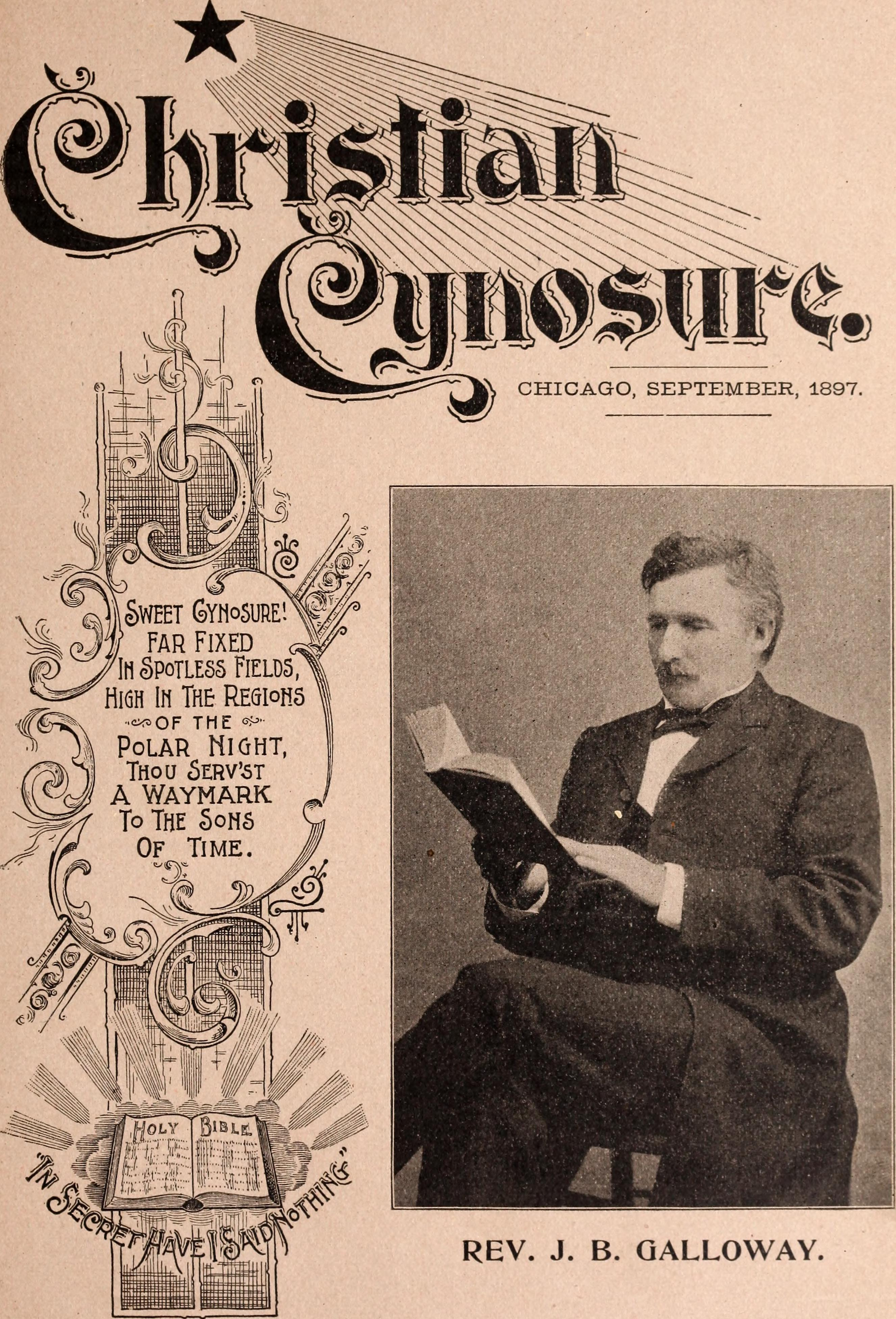
Christian Cynosure (1897)

The Christian Cynosure was a newspaper in existence from 1868 to 1983. Published in Chicago by the National Christian Association of Jonathan Blanchard, it was devoted to opposing secret societies such as the Freemasons and The Grange, featuring "emotional tirades and exposés which explained to God's servants why they should not belong to any secret organizations".
