= Wheaton College Men's Glee Club =

- Motto: Veritas. Integritas. Fraternitas.
- Motto in English: "Truth. Integrity. Brotherhood."
- Type: All-male Glee Club
- Established: 1907
- Director: Dr. Annika Stucky
- Location: Wheaton, Illinois, United States

The Wheaton College Men's Glee Club is an all-male glee club (or choir) at Wheaton College in Wheaton, Illinois, currently conducted by Dr. Annika Stucky.

Founded in 1907, the Men's Glee Club has maintained a long tradition of traditions under its three founding pillars: veritas, integritas, and fraternitas. The group is composed of around 40 men who hail from many different areas of study and many different parts of the world. They perform a wide range of sacred and secular repertoire, from the traditional MGC processional "Rise Up, O Men of God!" to the Scottish folk song "Loch Lomond."

== History ==
=== Early years ===
The first Men's Glee Club was organized in 1907 under the leadership of Miss Virginia Graham. The activity and size of this organization were seriously limited throughout the First World War. The Club was reorganized in 1921 under Professor George Karzenborn, who directed the group until 1927. In 1925 the Men's Glee Club made its first broadcast over WLS, "the Sears Roebuck station in Chicago." Later, the Glee Club was heard on the same station in 1961 when it sang on the College's "Chapel on the Campus" summer programs on Sundays.

Professor Leroy Hamps served as Club director from 1927 to 1931. During this period, the Glee Club members sang with the Women's Glee Club (now Women's Chorale) for the first time (1928) and took their first out-of-state tour (1929). The practice of extended tours began in 1931 when Dr. William "Uncle Bill" Nordin accompanied the first tour to the East Coast from Boston to Philadelphia. Both Men's and Women's Clubs toured the East again in 1933. The first West Coast tour was in 1937.

=== Halvorsen years ===
In 1958, Professor Clayton E. Halvorsen became director of the Glee Club. During his tenure, the group continued to tour the United States; it also began touring Europe in 1963. During those foreign tours, the club has sung in Notre Dame Cathedral in Paris, Grossmunster in Zurich, and before Queen Juliana of the Netherlands; the Men's Glee Club also performed in Soviet and Eastern Bloc countries while the Iron Curtain was still in existence.

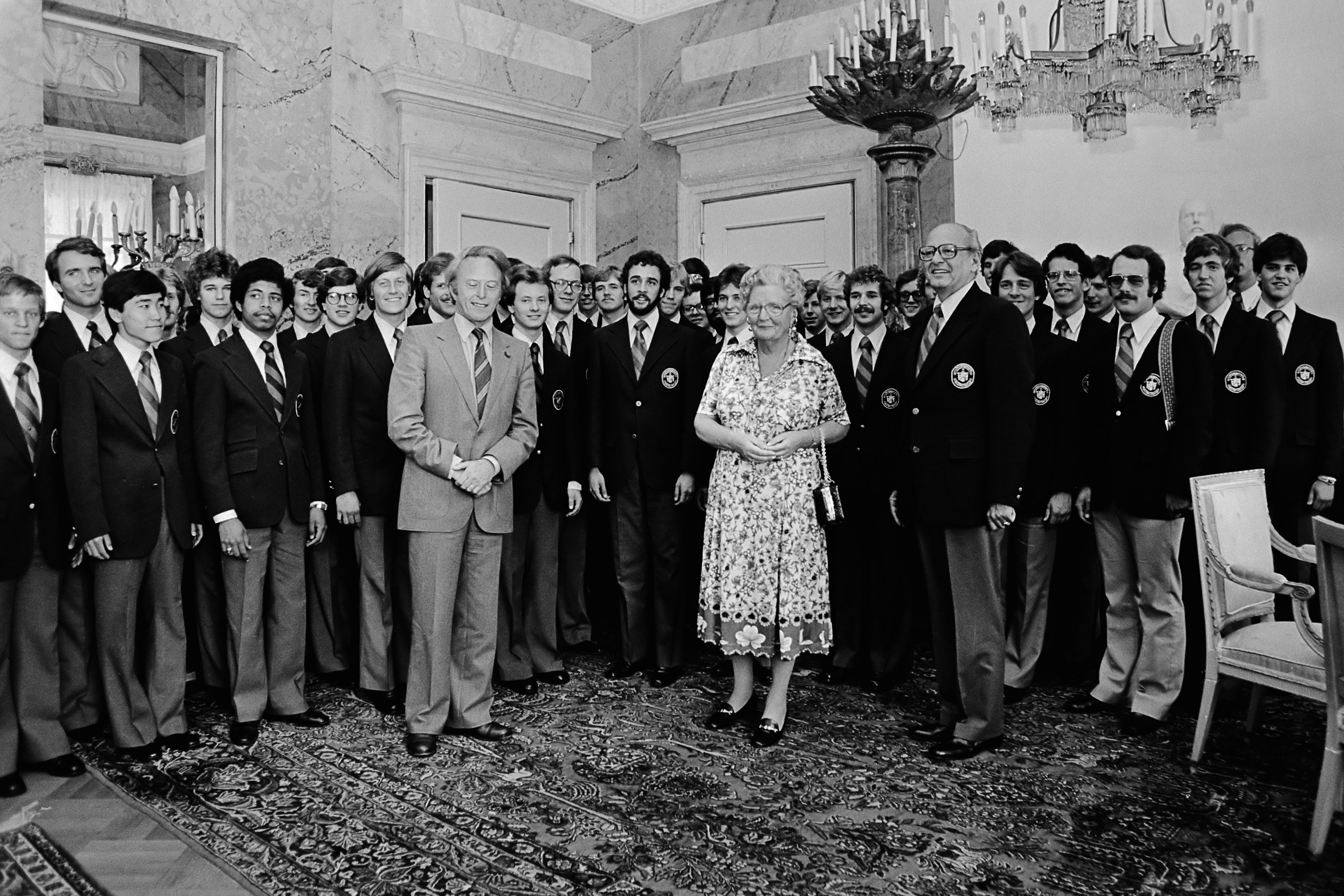
Wheaton College Men's Glee Club visiting Queen Juliana of the Netherlands (1979)

In 1979 and again in 1983, the group won first prize in the male chorus division at the International Choral Festival in The Hague, the Netherlands. On its European tour in 1983, the Club won two first prizes at the International Choirfest in Limberg, West Germany. From 1984 until recently, the Glee Club sang the national anthem at the Chicago Bears' football games, and in February 1988, the Glee Club performed at the National Prayer Breakfast in Washington, D.C.

=== Recent history ===
In 1988, Dr. Gerard B. Sundberg came from Minnesota's Bethel College to become the sixth conductor of the Club. Under Dr. Sundberg's direction, the group completed tours to Ontario, New York, Pennsylvania, Texas, Louisiana, Florida, Minnesota, California, Colorado, the West Coast, and the Southeastern States. In 1991, Dr. Sundberg's First European tour with the Glee Club highlighted performances in Bach's church in Leipzig, the Kaiser Wilheim Memorial Cathedral in Berlin, and in the Filedelfia Church in Stockholm. The Glee Club collaborated with the Women's Chorale in several pops concerts, most recently in the spring of 2001, as well as in performances of West Side Story in 1992 and The Pirates of Penzance in 1993.

In 2001, Dr. Mary Hopper, longtime director of Women's Chorale, became the seventh director of the Men's Glee Club. The Club went abroad in the summer of 2003 with a trip to Eastern Europe, where it last appeared with the Women's Chorale in 1994. John Nelson conducted the Glee Club and other campus choirs in several large works during this time, including Handel’s Messiah, Britten’s War Requiem, the Berlioz Requiem and most recently in 2010 with the performance of the Brahms' Ein Deutsches Requiem. Also in October 2010, the Club took a trip to the wilds of the "Great White North", performing in churches and schools in the Twin Cities area.

In 2007 the Club commemorated 100 years of existence by inviting all Old Men to campus for the Spring Concert and several other events. And in the summer of 2013, the Club reignited a long tradition of touring Europe by performing a number of concerts throughout France.

In 2017, the Men's Glee Club was invited to sing at the 2017 Silk Road Maritime Choral Festival in Hainan, China. This is the first time that the Club had toured in Asia. After performing in several Beijing churches, the Glee Club sang in the international festival with choirs from around the globe. The Glee Club performed with choirs from nations including Malaysia, Russia, and Pakistan. The club repertoire included "Sure on This Shining Night," "Betelehemu," "I Want Jesus to Walk with Me," and "Walk in Jerusalem."

In 2022 Dr. Mary Hopper retired after directing the Men's Glee Club and Women's Chorale for 21 years. Dr. Jerry Blackstone was chosen to serve as the interim director for the 2022-24 academic years. After his two-year appointment, John Swedberg lead the Club for the 2024-2025 academic year. In the spring of 2025, Dr. Annika Stucky was chosen as Dr. Mary Hopper's successor in leading both Men's Glee Club and Women's Chorale as Assistant Professor of Music, Choral Conductor in the Wheaton College Conservatory of Music.

== Motto ==
The motto of the Men's Glee Club, "Veritas. Integritas. Fraternitas." means "Truth. Integrity. Brotherhood." Veritas refers to the Club's foremost and undying commitment to the truth of the Gospel of the Christ Jesus. This leads to their commitment to Integritas, living a life of integrity worthy of the calling which they have received. And finally, this leads to Fraternitas, the love that binds brothers together through their love in Jesus. Veritas leads to Integritas which in turn leads to Fraternitas.

== Directors and terms ==
- Virginia Graham, 1907–1921
- George Karzenborn, 1921–1927
- LeRoy Hamps, 1927–1931
- Dr. William “Uncle Bill” Nordin, 1931–1958
- Clayton E. Halvorsen, 1958–1988
- Dr. Gerard Sundberg, 1988–2001
- Dr. Mary Hopper, 2001–2022
- Dr. Jerry Blackstone, 2022-2024
- John Swedberg, 2024-2025
- Dr. Annika Stucky, 2025–present

== Notable "Old Men" ==
- Hudson T. Armerding '41, President - Wheaton College, President - National Association of Evangelicals
- Richard C. Halverson '39, Chaplain - United States Senate, Chairman - World Vision U.S.
- Martin O'Donnell '77, Composer - best known for his work on the Halo soundtrack.
- Dr. James R. Appleton, President - University of Redlands
- Jonathan Lewis '72, President/CEO - Partners International
- Dr. Eugene Frost '75, Head of School - Wheaton Academy
- Jerry Blackstone - Grammy Award Winning Choral Conductor
- Niel Nielson - Covenant College, President
- Will Liverman - Grammy Award Winning Operatic Baritone
