= Perry Mastodon =

Perry Mastodon (sometimes called Perry, the Mastodon) is the name for some mastodon skeletal remains that were discovered along Riford Road in Glen Ellyn, Illinois. The remains were found on the property of Judge Joseph Sam Perry and Mrs. Nelle Perry on October 16, 1963, thus inspiring naming the remains after them. The remains can be seen in a recreated state on the campus of Wheaton College in Wheaton, Illinois at the science building, where the Geology Department also is housed.

The mastodon inspired some Wheaton College alumni to submit Mastodons as a suggestion for the school's mascot when the school was seeking to change its mascot.

Perry Mastodon also inspired a song called Perry, the Mastodon by college campus band, The Two Twangs.

The mastodon has been the victim of many pranks over the years. The most legendary occurred on Parents' Day 1975, when a bogus tape recording was inserted in place of the true story of the Mastodon. This prank was written up in the 1976 yearbook, the school newspaper, the Wheaton Daily Journal, and the official history of the college by Paul Bechtel.
