= Blanchard Hall =

- U.S. National Register of Historic Places
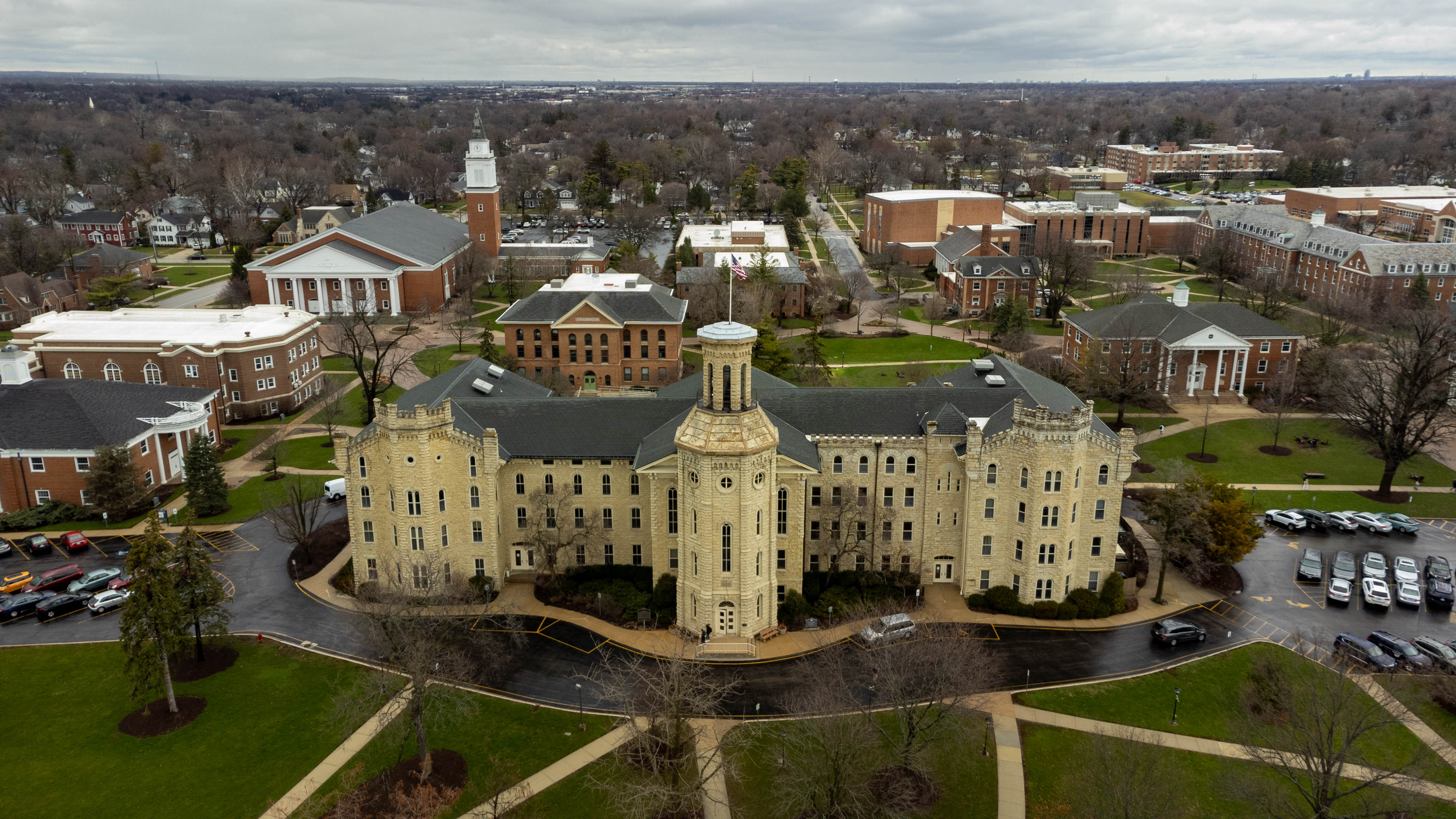

- Location within Illinois Location within the United States
- Location: Wheaton College campus Wheaton, DuPage County, Illinois
- Coordinates: 41°52′6.60″N 88°5′58.67″W
- Area: less than one acre
- Built: 1853; 173 years ago
- Architectural style: Romanesque
- NRHP reference No.: 79000836

Blanchard Hall is a limestone building on the campus of Wheaton College in Wheaton, Illinois. It was built in five phases starting in 1853. The first phase was completed in 1858 and the last in 1927.

== History ==
Blanchard Hall is the main building of Wheaton College in Wheaton, Illinois. Construction of Blanchard Hall began in 1853, and the building was completed in 1927. The building takes its name from Jonathan Blanchard, the founder of the college, and his son Charles A. Blanchard. The elder Blanchard sought to make the building a symbol of the power of Evangelical Protestantism. The building was completed shortly after the younger Blanchard finished his stint as University President.

The limestone for the building was quarried form Batavia, Illinois, and the architecture is based on buildings at Oxford University. The Classical Revival is the dominant form of the building, although there are details of Italianate and Romanesque Revival design. The building features a 1,000-pound copper bell with the school's motto engraved on it.

It is currently used by the Humanities and Social Sciences departments, Human Resources, Accounting, and also houses the offices of the President, Provost, and Chief Financial Officer. There have been no major changes since 1927. On November 14, 1979, the building was recognized by the National Park Service with a listing on the National Register of Historic Places.

== Architecture ==
The building was completed in five stages. The first phase was a two-story building that opened in 1858; this section is now in the center, excluding the tower. Its two-story narrow arched windows can still be seen behind the tower. The 80-foot (24 m), five-sided tower was added to the middle of the main facade (facing south) in 1871. Two years later, a three-story wing was added to the west. A four-story eastern wing was added in 1890. The building was finally made symmetrical in 1927 with and addition to the east wing. Limestone quoins decorate window bays. The roof is decorated with a stone battlement.
