= College Church =

Christian evangelical nondenominational church in Wheaton, Illinois, US

Coordinates: 41°52′4″N 88°6′6″W

College Church is an evangelical nondenominational church in the broadly Reformed, congregationalist tradition located in Wheaton, Illinois. It was founded in 1861 by Jonathan Blanchard, who was also the first president of Wheaton College, an unaffiliated university. College Church is located across two city blocks facing the Wheaton College campus; however, Wheaton College is not formally tied to College Church. Josh Moody has been the Senior Pastor of College Church since 2009. It reported regular membership of 1,290 in 2022.

The Church owns a Georgian revival building that faces the college campus on Washington Street.

== History ==
College Church was organized in 1861 by Jonathan Blanchard in 1861. The church first met on the campus of Wheaton College as "The First Church of Christ in Wheaton." Blanchard wanted the church to be known for its opposition to: slavery, secret societies, and alcohol use.

The church was first affiliated with the Congregational Association of Illinois. Blanchard's involvement as the first president of Wheaton College and as the founder of College Church caused the two institutions to share statements of faith and facilities. The church suffered divisions over doctrine and affiliation during the years after its founding, leading to the creation of what are now First Presbyterian Church in Wheaton and Wheaton Bible Church. After a reorganization in 1878 the church was renamed the College Church of Christ. It gained its current name, College Church, in 1963, in an effort to distinguish itself from the Churches of Christ movement, which has a different theology.

Although it is not formally associated with Wheaton College, College Church has long been closely associated with the college and drawn large numbers of students and members of the faculty to its services. Pastoral leadership throughout its history is as follows:

- Jonathan Blanchard (1860–62)
- Charles A. Blanchard (1878–1883)
- Evan Welsh (1933–1946)
- Robert G. Rayburn (1947–50)
- Carl Armerding (1951–1955)
- L. P. McClenny (1958–1972)
- Nathan Goff (1973–1977)
- R. Kent Hughes (1979–2006)
- Joshua Moody (2009–present)
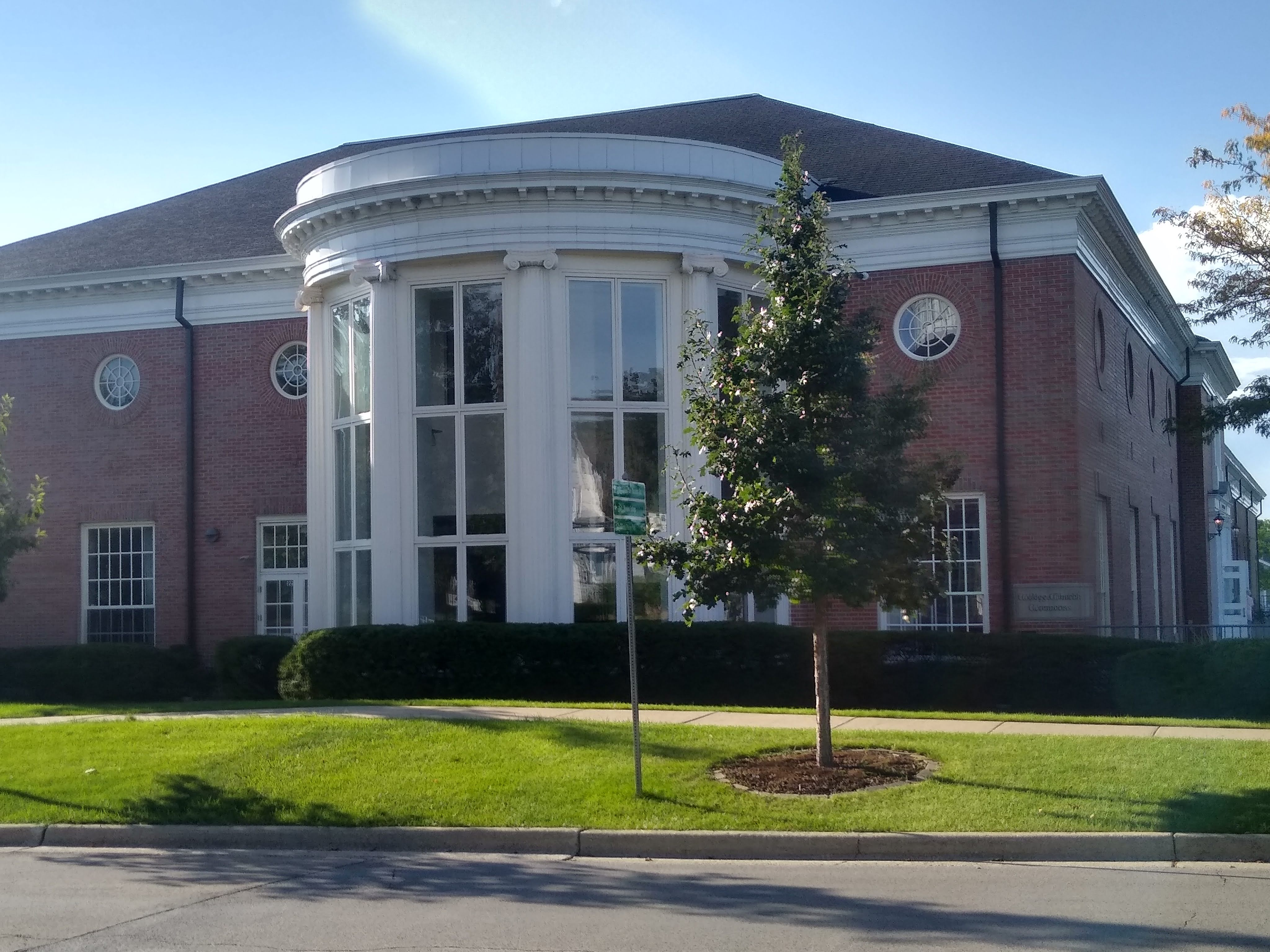

== Ministries ==
College Church's local ministries include a children's, youth and college ministry. The high school ministry was formerly led by Zach Fallon, now serving as an incoming senior pastor for a church plant in the Atlanta, Georgia south metro area. The college ministry was led by Ben Panner. The church offers the disability ministry STARS (Seeking to Always Reflect the Savior) "to make access to worship, ministry, and fellowship a reality for any child or adult with special needs." College Church has ties with church plant congregations in Chicago, Batavia, Lombard, and Naperville. It has connections with the Outreach Community Center, and two resale shops. It runs a pastoral training program for pastoral residents. This training program is modelled after the medical residency system.

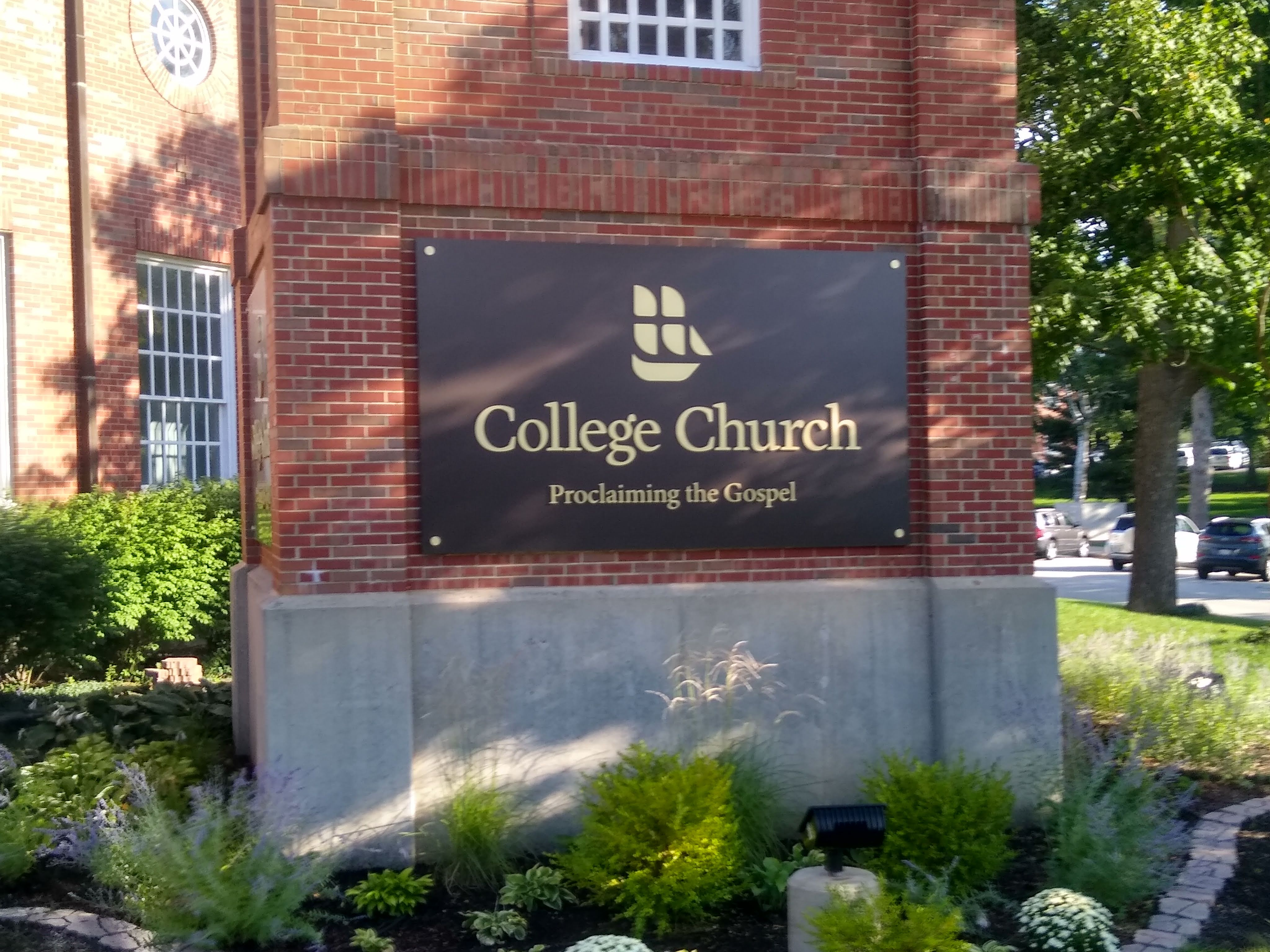

== Aerial photos and maps ==
- "satellite view of College Church" (Map). Google Maps.

== Bibliography ==
- "Teen angels". Chicago Sun-Times. May 12, 2001. p. 26. "More than 100 junior high kids have signed the Covenant for Biblical Sexuality at College Church in Wheaton."
- Minutes of the First Church of Christ in Wheaton, 1866–1879.
- Minutes of the First Congregational Church 1879–1909.
- Minutes of the First Presbyterian Church 1909–1952.
- A History of DuPage County, Richmond & Vallette 1857.
- A History of DuPage County, C. W. Richmond 1876.
- History of DuPage County, Rufus Blanchard 1882.
- Report of Council of Congregational Churches, Held in Wheaton in February 1879.
- "College Church in Wheaton". New York: American Guild of Organists. Archived from the original on May 19, 2011. "The present, spacious sanctuary was built in 1991 and 1992. The Reginald Gerig Organ (College Church organist, 1953–1991) was built for the present sanctuary..."
