= Wheaton College Conservatory of Music =

Conservatory of Music Wheaton College

Location
- Wheaton, Illinois; USA; 41°52′07″N 88°05′58″W

Information
- Type: Department and Professional School of Wheaton College
- Dean: Michael D. Wilder, PhD
- Campus: Suburban
- Website: wheaton.edu/Conservatory

The Conservatory of Music at Wheaton College is a music conservatory located in Wheaton, Illinois. It is both a department and professional school of Wheaton College. It currently has 21 full-time faculty members and approximately 200 undergraduate music majors, and is fully accredited by the National Association of Schools of Music. The Conservatory also operates a Community School of the Arts, serving the music and arts education needs of the surrounding community.

== Academics ==
The Conservatory offers both the Bachelor of Music and Bachelor of Music Education degrees. Majors for the Bachelor of Music include composition, history/literature, pedagogy, performance (orchestral instruments, organ, piano, and voice), and elective studies in an outside field. The Bachelor of Music Education degree offers emphases in choral or instrumental music.

The Conservatory seeks to train its students in four broad areas: composition, performance, teaching, and scholarship. All music degrees require a core of music theory, ear training, and music history. Performance studies are an integral part of the curriculum: all degrees require regular jury examinations on major instruments and participation in large ensembles. This broad approach reflects the liberal arts context of the whole of Wheaton College, of which the Conservatory is a constituent academic unit.

The Conservatory also offers a Bachelor of Arts in Music program, which combines 40 hours of music classes with the liberal arts general education track. A music minor is also available.

== Administration ==
In 2008, Dr. Michael Wilder was appointed Wheaton's Dean of the Conservatory, Art, and Communication. Upon his arrival, the administrative structure of the Conservatory was reorganized to reflect its duality as both a department of the college and a professional school. Reporting to the dean, in addition to the chairs of the Art Department and Communication Department, are a tier of directors managing the Conservatory's programs.

- Director of Academic Studies in Music: Dr. R. Edward Zimmerman - oversight of music theory and composition, music history, conducting, and technology
- Director of the Community School of the Arts: Mrs. Paula Cisar
- Director of Conservatory Special Programs: Dr. Tony Payne - oversight of the Artist Series at Wheaton College, a series of professional performing artists, and the Conservatory's two summer programs, Arts in London and Music and Ministry in the Great Cities of Europe
- Director of Music Education: Dr. Brady McNeil - oversight of the music education program
- Director of Performance Studies: Dr. Benjamin Klemme - oversight of Conservatory large ensembles

== Ensembles ==
Ensembles are the most visible part of the Conservatory and provide students an opportunity both for application of their musical training and for fellowship and social involvement.

=== Large ensembles ===
The Conservatory has several large ensembles that are open to any Wheaton College student with sufficient skill. Each maintains an active performance schedule of home concerts, run-outs, and tours. Membership of each ensemble is established by an annual audition.

- Men's Glee Club: TTBB ensemble, directed by Annika Stucky
- Women's Chorale: SSAA ensemble, directed by Annika Stucky
- Jazz Ensemble: directed by Deanna Witkowski
- Symphony Orchestra: the college's full orchestra, directed by Benjamin Klemme
- Concert Choir: SATB ensemble, directed by John Trotter
- Symphonic Band: wind and percussion ensemble, directed by Brady McNeil

=== Chamber music ===
The Conservatory also has an extensive chamber music program. Standing chamber groups include the percussion ensemble, under the direction of Dr. Kathleen Kastner, which presents a fall and spring concert; Opera Music Theater, under the direction of Dr. Sarah Holman; piano ensemble, under the direction of Dr. Karin Edwards; and the trombone choir, under the direction of Mr. John Mindeman. Other groups of traditional and non-traditional instrument combinations are formed on an annual basis. The annual Chamber Music Competition is a showcase of these ensembles. A recent, related addition to the program are the jazz combos.

== Facilities ==
The Conservatory complex consists of four buildings on Wheaton's main campus in Wheaton, Illinois.

=== Edman Memorial Chapel ===
In addition to holding undergraduate chapel services and numerous large special events such as Commencement and the annual Talent Show, Edman Memorial Chapel is the Conservatory's primary large ensemble performance venue. The auditorium seats 2400 and houses a 70 rank Casavant organ, Opus 3796, installed in 2001. A backstage addition was completed in 2009 including a new instrumental rehearsal hall and instructional space for harp, harpsichord, percussion, and string bass.

=== McAlister Hall ===
Built in the 1960s, McAlister Hall housed classrooms, practice rooms, the department offices, and many teaching studios until 2017, when most functions were moved to the newly renovated Armerding Center. In 2023 McAlister Hall was renovated to house the Modern and Classical Languages department.

=== Pierce Chapel ===
Built in the 1920s in a joint venture between Wheaton College and College Interdenominational Church of Christ, Pierce Chapel once served as the Conservatory's recital hall. The building's lower-level houses organ practice rooms, teaching studios, the music technology lab, and two large classrooms, and the upper level, above the recital hall, houses offices for the Community School of the Arts. In addition to serving as the venue for student and faculty performers, the recital hall also was used for student prayer and worship services throughout the year. In 2011, a two-manual, seventeen-rank mechanical-action organ built by Charles Hendrickson was donated to Wheaton and installed in the rear of the chapel.

=== Armerding Center for Music and the Arts ===
The former Armerding Science Center at the northern end of campus began an extensive renovation culminating in the opening of the new Armerding Center for Music and the Arts in October 2017. As of late 2017, many functions previously housed in McAlister Hall and Pierce Chapel have been moved into the new building.

== Notable alumni ==
- Sylvia McNair, Grammy Award-winning singer
- John Nelson, conductor and advocate for sacred music
- Marty O'Donnell, composer for Bungie's Halo video game series
- Elliot Leung, composer of the highest grossing non-English film of all time, The Battle at Lake Changjin
- Camille and Kennerly Kitt, twin harpists and actresses

== Special programs ==
=== Wheaton College Artist Series ===
The Artist Series brings professional performing arts groups to campus, with several events spaced throughout the school year. Orchestras, dance companies, soloists, and world music ensembles are all included in the Series' offerings. Recent guests have been as varied as Bobby McFerrin, Canadian Brass, the King's Singers, the Royal Philharmonic Orchestra, and the Russian National Ballet. Most years include one event featuring Conservatory ensembles performing a choral-orchestral masterwork or joining with other special artists.

=== Arts in London ===
Arts in London is a month-long study program occurring at the beginning of alternate summers. Faculty from the Conservatory, as well as the Theater and Art Departments, teach courses in art, music, and theater on-site in London's museums, theaters, and concert halls. The program also includes a weekend trip to Paris to further explore the European arts tradition.

=== Music and Ministry in the Great Cities of Europe ===
Music and Ministry in the Great Cities of Europe was the Conservatory's international missions program. MMGCE was a three-week trip occurring at the beginning of alternate summers. A group of students, would form a choir and have a student brass ensemble accompany, traveled and performed in such cities as Budapest, London, Moscow, and Vienna, among others, depending on the year.
