= Wheaton College (Illinois) =

Christian private college in Wheaton, Illinois, U.S.

- Motto: Christo et Regno Ejus
- Motto in English: For Christ and His Kingdom
- Type: Private liberal arts college
- Established: 1860; 166 years ago
- Religious affiliation: Evangelical
- Academic affiliations: Council for Christian Colleges and Universities; Consortium of Liberal Arts Colleges; Christian College Consortium
- Endowment: $672.2 million (2025)
- President: Philip Ryken
- Faculty: 194 full-time, 143 part-time (fall 2023)
- Students: 2,799 (fall 2023)
- Undergraduates: 2,119 (fall 2023)
- Postgraduates: 680 (fall 2023)
- Location: Wheaton, Illinois, United States; 41°52′13″N 88°05′55″W
- Campus: 80 acres (32.4 ha); Suburban
- Colors: Blue and Orange
- Nickname: Thunder
- Sporting affiliations: NCAA Division III – CCIW
- Mascot: Tor the Mastodon
- Website: www.wheaton.edu

Wheaton College is a private Evangelical Christian college in Wheaton, Illinois, United States. A four-year liberal arts school, it was founded by evangelical abolitionists in 1860. Wheaton College was a stop on the Underground Railroad and graduated one of Illinois' first Black college graduates. It has been considered one of the leading Christian universities in the United States and an influential institution in North American evangelicalism and as an anchor of the "Bible belt" centered around the Wheaton area.

== History ==
Wheaton College was founded in 1860. Its predecessor, the Illinois Institute, had been founded in late 1853 by Wesleyan Methodists as a college and preparatory school. Wheaton's first president, Jonathan Blanchard, was a former president of Knox College in Galesburg, Illinois, and a staunch abolitionist with ties to Oberlin College. Mired in financial trouble and unable to sustain the institution, the Wesleyans looked to Blanchard for new leadership. He took on the role as president in 1860, having suggested several Congregationalist appointees to the board of trustees the previous year. The Wesleyans, similar in spirit and mission to the Congregationalists, were happy to relinquish control of the Illinois Institute. Blanchard officially separated the college from any denominational support and was responsible for its new name, given in honor of trustee and benefactor Warren L. Wheaton, who founded the town of Wheaton after moving to Illinois from New England.

A dogged reformer, Blanchard began his public campaign for abolitionism with the American Anti-Slavery Society in 1836, at the age of twenty-five. Later in his life, after the Civil War, he began a sustained campaign against Freemasonry. This culminated in a national presidential campaign on the American Anti-Masonic Party ticket in 1884.

- Blanchard Hall, Wheaton College
- U.S. National Register of Historic Places
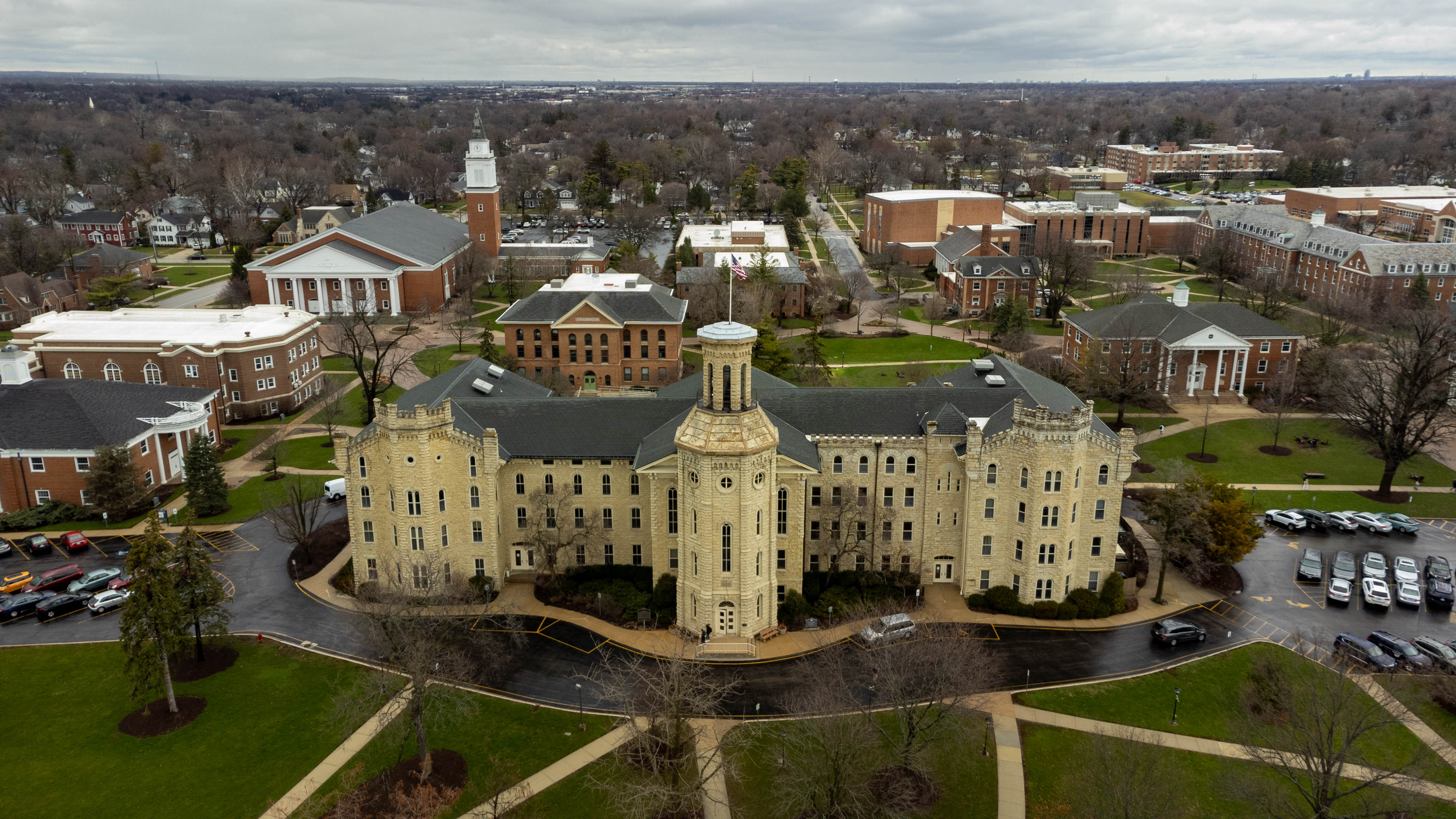
- Blanchard Hall
- Location: 501 College Ave., Wheaton, Illinois
- Area: Less than one acre
- Built: 1853
- Architectural style: Classical Revival, Romanesque
- NRHP reference No.: 79000836
- Added to NRHP: November 14, 1979

Under Blanchard's leadership, the college was a stop on the Underground Railroad. The confirmation came from the letters of Ezra Cook, one of Blanchard's relatives by marriage, who notes that the town and college's anti-slavery beliefs were so widely held that he, along with hundreds of other Wheaton residents, had seen and spoken with fugitive slaves.

Blanchard consistently lobbied for universal co-education and was a strong proponent of reform through strong public education open to all. At this time, Wheaton was the only school in Illinois with a college-level women's program. Also, Wheaton saw its first graduate of color in 1866, when Edward Breathitte Sellers took his degree. Additionally, he is one of the first African-American college graduates in Illinois. In 1882, Charles A. Blanchard succeeded his father as president of the college.

In 1925, J. Oliver Buswell, an outspoken Presbyterian, delivered a series of lectures at Wheaton College. Shortly after that, President Charles Blanchard died, and Buswell was called to be the third president of Wheaton. Upon his installation in April 1926, he became the nation's youngest college president at age 31. Buswell's tenure was characterized by expanding enrollment (from approximately 400 in 1925 to 1,100 in 1940), a building program, strong academic development, and a boom in the institution's reputation. It was also known for growing divisiveness over faculty scholarship and personality clashes. In 1940, this tension led to the firing of Buswell for being, as two college historians put it, "too argumentative in temperament and too intellectual in his approach to Christianity." By the late 1940s, Wheaton was emerging as a standard-bearer of Evangelicalism.

By 1950, enrollment at the college had surpassed 1,600. In the second half of the twentieth century, enrollment growth and more selective admissions accompanied athletic success, additional and improved facilities, and expanded programs.

In 1951, Honey Rock, a camp in Three Lakes, Wisconsin, was purchased by the college.

The school changed its nickname from the Crusaders to the Thunder in 2000. The national press noted the change, and some alumni objected. Wheaton rejected other suggestions for a new mascot name, including the Mastodons — a reference to Perry Mastodon, which is a mastodon skeleton that was excavated nearby and is now on display on the college campus in the science building. While still known by the nickname "Thunder", in 2011, the college officially changed its mascot to a mastodon named "Tor Thunder" to integrate the nickname and mascot.

In 2003, Wheaton revised its long-standing conduct code to allow faculty to drink alcohol and smoke in private and to permit students to dance off campus and at approved campus events, while still banning alcohol and tobacco use on campus. The change reflected a broader shift among evangelicals away from viewing drinking and dancing as absolute moral prohibitions and toward treating them as matters of personal discretion.

On October 13, 2007, Stanton L. Jones, a Provost of Wheaton College, signed the interfaith document "Loving God and Neighbor Together: A Christian Response to A Common Word Between Us and You," agreeing that Islam and Christianity can be at peace with each other.

In 2010, the public phase of "The Promise of Wheaton" campaign came to a close with $250.7 million (~$361 million in 2025) raised, an "unprecedented 5-1/2 year campaign figure for Wheaton College". In the same year, Wheaton College became the first American Associate University of the Tony Blair Faith Foundation's Faith and Globalization Initiative. Tony Blair noted that the partnership will "give emerging leaders in the United States and the United Kingdom the opportunity to explore in depth the critical issues of how faith impacts the modern world today through different faith and cultural lenses" and that Wheaton's participation will "greatly enrich the Initiative".

=== Presidents ===
- Jonathan Blanchard (1860–1882)
- Charles A. Blanchard (1882–1925)
- J. Oliver Buswell (1926–1940)
- V. Raymond Edman (1941–1965)
- Hudson Armerding (1965–1982)
- J. Richard Chase (1982–1993)
- A. Duane Litfin (1993–2010)
- Philip G. Ryken (2010–present)

== Controversies ==
In 2004, Wheaton College dismissed Joshua Hochschild, assistant professor of philosophy, for converting to Roman Catholicism. Wheaton's president said his "personal desire" to retain Hochschild, "a gifted brother in Christ", was outweighed by his duty to employ "faculty who embody the institution's Protestant convictions".

In 2008, English professor Kent Gramm resigned after declining to give the college administration details of his pending divorce from his wife of 30 years.

In December 2015, Wheaton College suspended a tenured professor of political science Larycia Hawkins, due to "significant questions regarding the theological implications" of comments she made about religious solidarity between Muslims and Christians. The two officially parted ways in February 2016.

== Campus ==
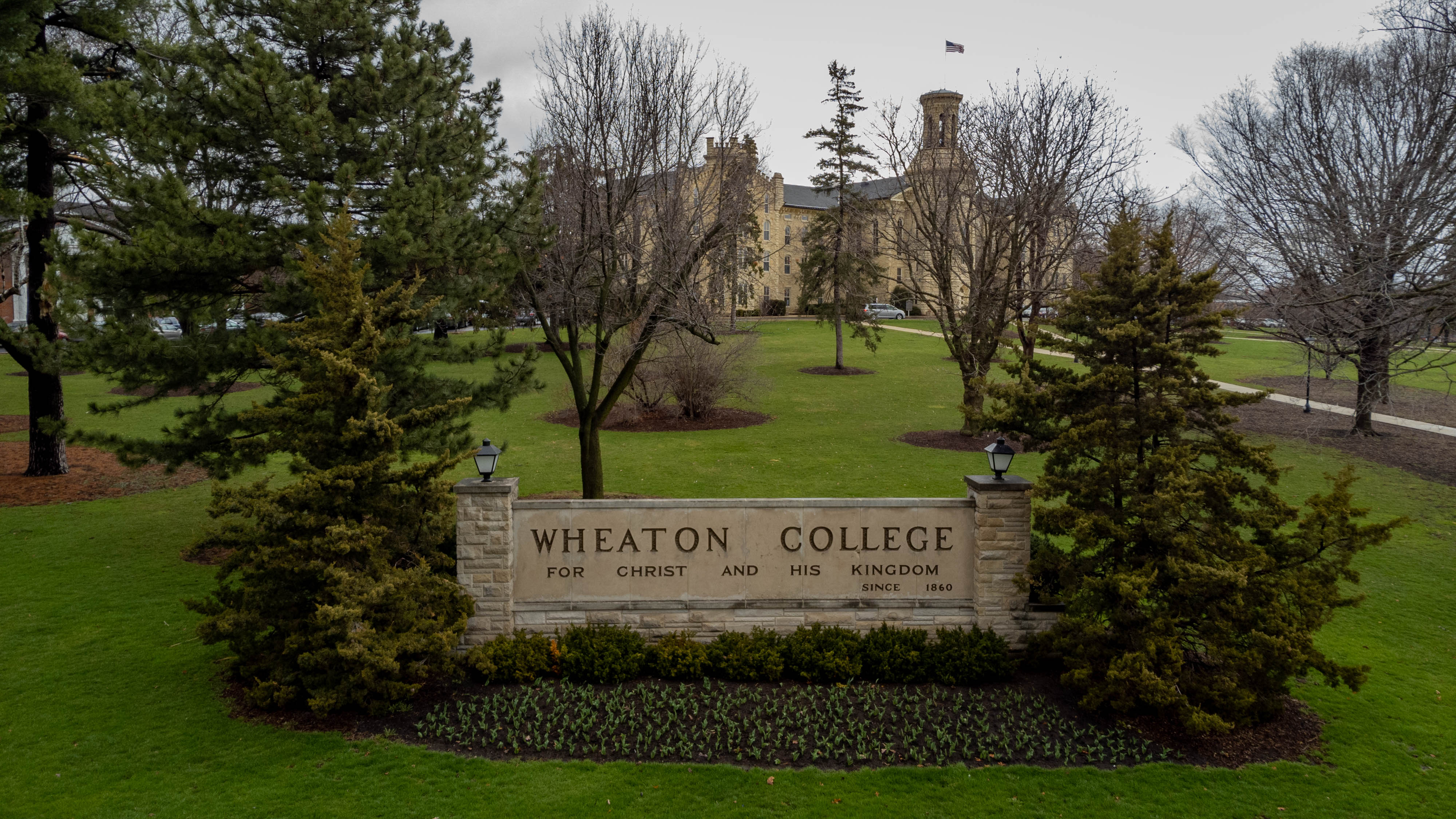
Wheaton College was established in 1860

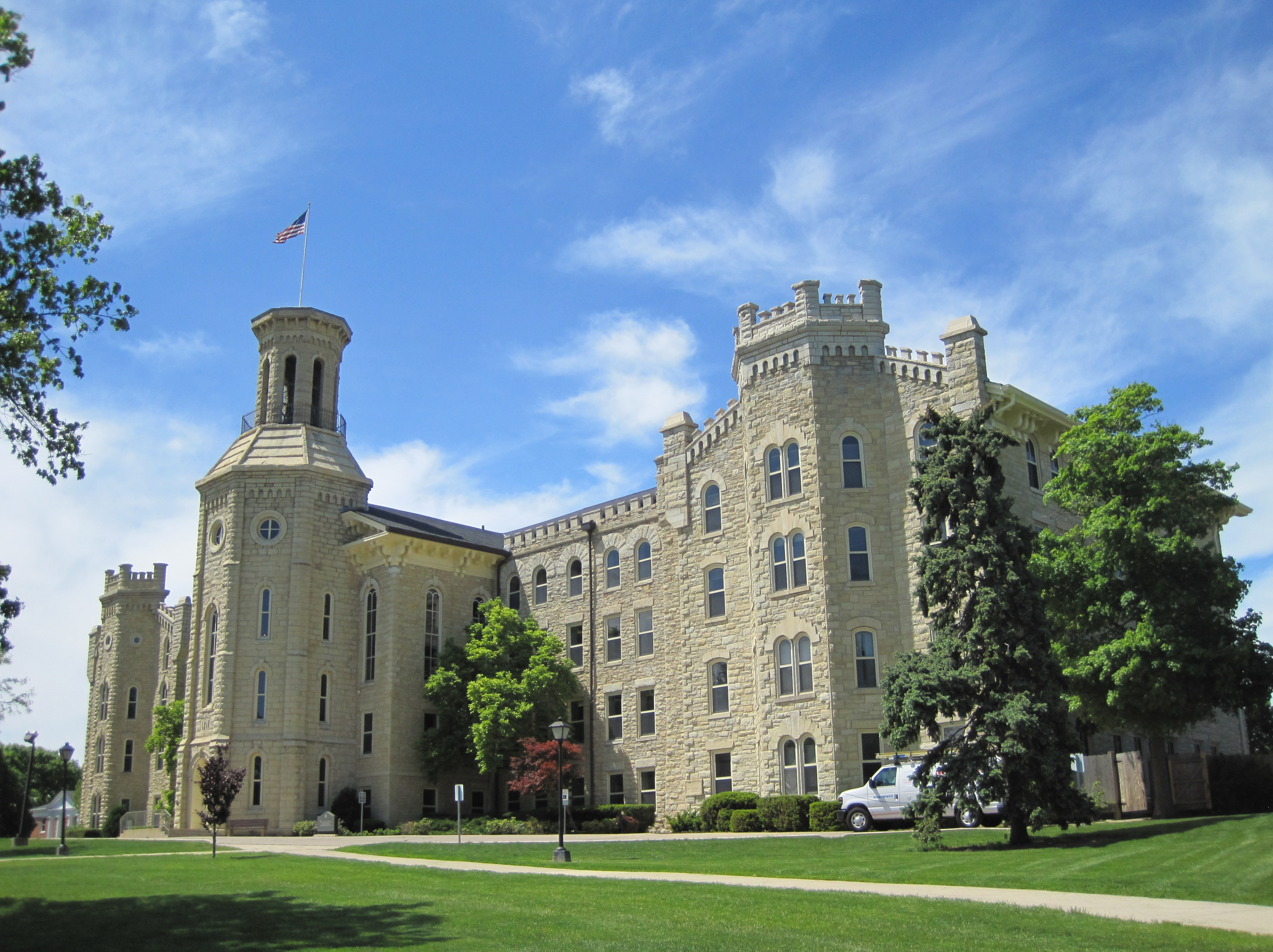
Blanchard Hall houses offices for departments in the Humanities and Social Sciences as well as the offices of the President, the Provost, Vice-Presidents, and Academic Affairs.

Wheaton's most recognizable and oldest building is Blanchard Hall, a limestone structure erected in 1853 to join the two-story "boarding hall" at the foot of the hill as the only two on campus. Jonathan Blanchard had a vision for the expansion of this structure into its present castle-like edifice. Wheaton contends that it patterns its campus architecture after buildings at the University of Oxford, which Blanchard admired on a trip to England in 1843. After four additions (1871, 1873, 1890, 1927), Wheaton completed the Main Building in 1927. That year, under college president J. Oliver Buswell, Jr., Wheaton renamed the Main Building Blanchard Hall to honor Wheaton's first two presidents, Jonathan Blanchard and his son Charles.

Blanchard Hall served as a stop on the Underground Railroad.

=== Academic ===
In 1900, Wheaton built the brick "Industrial Building". From 1917 to 1945 it housed the Wheaton Academy, and from 1945 to 1960 the Graduate School. In 1960 it was renamed Buswell Hall, and in 1980 renamed Schell Hall in honor of Edward R. Schell.

Wheaton housed its science departments in Breyer (chemistry) and Armerding (biology, geology, math, and physics) halls until the 2010–11 school year when Wheaton completed a new Meyer Science Center. Armerding Hall was also the home to the Wheaton College Observatory (a feature of the college since the presidency of Charles Blanchard in the late nineteenth century), which Wheaton relocated to the Meyer Science Center.

The Wheaton College Conservatory of Music, housed in the Armerding Center for Music and Arts (previously in McAlister Hall and Pierce Memorial Chapel), is an internationally recognized music school and is the only conservatory within an Evangelical school of higher education. The approximately 200 students within the conservatory focus on various fields of music, including education, performance, composition, and history. Student recitals, required for graduation with a music degree, are held in the Armerding recital hall.

== Academics ==
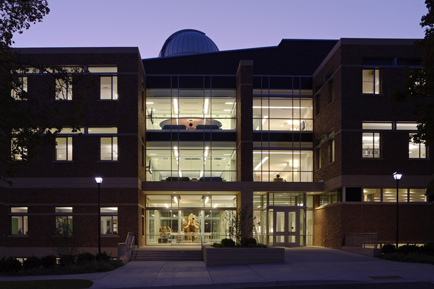
LEED Gold rated Meyer Science Center houses classrooms, laboratories, greenhouse, and rooftop observatory

Wheaton College is accredited by the Higher Learning Commission.

According to The Princeton Review's "The Best 351 Colleges", "If the integration of faith and learning is what you want out of a college, Wheaton is arguably the best school in the nation with a Christ-based worldview." Students may choose from about 40 majors in many liberal arts disciplines and the sciences. The most popular undergraduate majors, based on 2021 graduates, were:

- Business/Managerial Economics (64)
- Psychology (46)
- Biology/Biological Sciences (33)
- English Language and Literature (30)
- Elementary Education and Teaching (28)
- Health Services/Allied Health/Health Sciences (28)
- International Relations and Affairs (28)

In 2025, U.S. News & World Report ranked Wheaton College at 53 out of 265 Best National Liberal Arts Colleges. Wheaton continued to achieve high rankings in several areas of the report:

- No. 36 in freshmen retention (2025 Report)
- No. 38 in top performers on social mobility (2025 Report)

Wheaton College ranked ninth in the nation in the total number of graduates (all fields) who went on to earn doctorates (from 1986 to 1995) according to Franklin & Marshall College's 2004 survey, which included more than 900 private colleges and universities.

A “Statement of Faith and Educational Purpose” must be reaffirmed annually by all members of Wheaton’s Board of Trustees, faculty, and staff as a condition of continued employment. Signers affirm belief in a set of evangelical Protestant doctrines that include biblical inerrancy, the historical existence of a “directly created” Adam and Eve, and the existence of Satan.

Wheaton's acceptance of evolutionary biology in the science departments has been controversial to religious creationists. Wheaton College was prominently featured in the 2001 PBS documentary Evolution, which showcased Wheaton professors' acceptance of theistic evolution.

Forbes magazine ranked Wheaton College 75th in their annual list of 650 best undergraduate institutions and gave Wheaton a financial grade of "A". Forbes also lists Wheaton among the Top 100 ROI Colleges in 2014.

Throughout 2010-2020, Wheaton College ranked 18th in the National Center for Science and Engineering Statistics' survey of baccalaureate-origin institutions of non-Science-and-Engineering doctorate recipients. This ranking uses an institutional yield weighted by an institution's number of graduates.

=== Conservatory of Music ===
Wheaton College is home to a Conservatory of Music accredited by the National Association of Schools of Music. The conservatory offers two professional music degrees: the Bachelor of Music (with emphases in performance, pedagogy, composition, history, and literature, or elective studies) and the Bachelor of Music Education. There are approximately 200 music majors in the conservatory, with a student-faculty ratio of 7:1. Music majors and liberal arts majors alike perform in the conservatory's nine ensembles: concert choir, jazz ensemble, men's glee club, symphonic band, symphony orchestra, and women's chorale. Graduates include conductor John Nelson, Grammy Award-winning American soprano Sylvia McNair, and Wendy White of the Metropolitan Opera.

=== Artist Series ===
The Artist Series at Wheaton College, operating under the umbrella of the Conservatory of Music, is a concert series that brings world-class performers to the Wheaton College community. Previous Artist Series performers include the Chicago Symphony Orchestra, the Royal Philharmonic Orchestra, The King's Singers, violinist Midori, pianist Emanuel Ax, violinist Ray Chen, Lorin Maazel and the Symphonica Toscanini, Ladysmith Black Mambazo, the Canadian Brass, and the Royal Scots Dragoon Guards & Band of the Coldstream Guard. The Artist Series frequently partners with Wheaton College Conservatory graduates, including the baritone Will Liverman, soprano Sylvia McNair and the conductor John Nelson.

=== Graduate school ===
The Wheaton College Graduate School was founded in 1937 to provide further theological training and ministry skills. The college and graduate school are on an 80-acre campus in Wheaton, Illinois, a 45-minute train ride west of downtown Chicago. There are approximately 550 graduate students enrolled, with a 14:1 student/faculty ratio.

The graduate school comprises six academic departments; Biblical and Theological Studies, Christian Formation & Ministry, Evangelism and Leadership, Intercultural Studies, Psychology, and Teaching. The Duane Liftin Divinity School, housing the Bible and Theology and Ministry/Leadership programs is undergoing the process of Association of Theological Schools accreditation as a seminary as of 2026. The Graduate School offers 14 Master of Arts programs and two doctoral programs, a Ph.D. in Biblical & Theological Studies and a Psy.D. in Clinical Psychology. The American Psychological Association and Council for the Accreditation of Educator Preparation accredit graduate school programs.

Five of the master's programs provide a flexible degree option. Wheaton offers a Biblical Studies program as a part-time, evening cohort model. The school offers Missional Church Movements and TESOL and Intercultural Studies in a summer-only format. The college also offers an Evangelism & Leadership the Christian Formation and Ministry – Outdoor and Adventure Ministry concentration in a year-round modular format.

=== Library and collections ===
The library, named after college trustee Robert E. Nicholas, opened in January 1952. In 1975 Buswell Memorial Library, named for the college's third president J. Oliver Buswell, Jr., was built adjacent to the Nicholas Library, and an interior corridor linked the two, creating the college's main library. The building also contains the Peter Stam Music Library, located downstairs and named in honor of the Conservatory of Music's first head, Peter Stam. Buswell Memorial Library's physical collections contain over one million items, making Buswell the largest library collection of liberal arts colleges in Illinois. In September 2001, the Marion E. Wade Center, formerly housed in Buswell Library, moved to its new purpose-built home. Established in 1965 by professor of English Clyde S. Kilby, the Wade Center is an extensive research library and museum of the books and papers of seven British writers: C. S. Lewis, G. K. Chesterton, J. R. R. Tolkien, Owen Barfield, Dorothy L. Sayers, George MacDonald, and Charles Williams. The Wade Center has memorabilia of the Inklings, including C. S. Lewis's writing desk and a wardrobe from his childhood home constructed by his grandfather, widely thought to have inspired the Chronicles of Narnia series (although Westmont College also owns a wardrobe that once belonged to Lewis), Charles Williams's bookcases, J. R. R. Tolkien's writing desk where he wrote the entirety of The Hobbit and worked on The Lord of the Rings, and Pauline Baynes's original map of Narnia.

Buswell Library's special collections also include the archived correspondence, manuscripts, articles, photos, and other papers of Madeleine L'Engle, the Newbery Medal-winning author of A Wrinkle in Time. With items dating as early as 1919, the collection is composed largely of material sent to the college by L'Engle, supplemented with books and other supporting materials. The collection is the most comprehensive research center for L'Engle's work.

=== Off-campus study ===
Wheaton gives students several off-campus study opportunities.

The college sponsors study-abroad programs in Asia, England, France, Germany, Israel, Latin America, and Spain, as well as a summer program in Washington, D.C. Participants in Wheaton-in-England, one of the most popular annual programs, take 2–3 courses in literature while studying in London and St. Anne's College, Oxford.

Many students also participate in the Human Needs and Global Resources program. The HNGR program matches select students with six-month internships in the Third World, including opportunities in Africa, Asia, and Latin America.

Wheaton also sponsors a semester-long, experiential, residential program called Wheaton in Chicago. In Chicago, students complete internships and take advanced interdisciplinary coursework. Founded in 1998, it has enrolled students from more than 20 majors.

In 1935, Wheaton established the Wheaton College Science Station in the Black Hills of South Dakota for field instruction in the natural sciences.

In 1951, HoneyRock, the outdoor center for leadership development at Wheaton College, was established in Three Lakes, Wisconsin. HoneyRock is not only a year-round camp for young people, but it offers a variety of leadership schools and courses for students. Nearly 3,000 people utilize HoneyRock each year.

Due to Wheaton's membership in the Council for Christian Colleges & Universities, Wheaton students may also study at the Wycliffe Hall, Oxford, the Los Angeles Film Studies Center, Excelsia College in Australia, and Xi'an Foreign Language University in China. The CCCU also sponsors programs in American studies, Latin American studies, Middle Eastern studies, Russian studies, and journalism.

== Student life ==
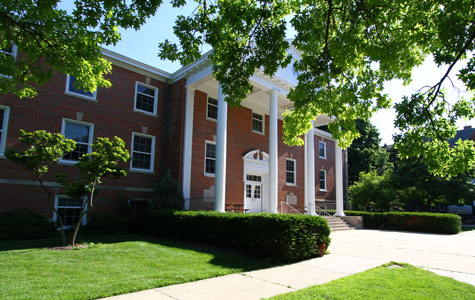
LEED-certified Memorial Student Center houses the Business and Economics department, the Politics and International Relations department, and the Center for Faith, Politics, and Economics

Wheaton dedicated the Memorial Student Center (MSC) on June 11, 1951. The college built the center in memory of over 1,600 former students and graduates who served in World War II and in honor of those 39 who gave their lives. The center housed the Student Union Café, nicknamed "the Stupe" (which has since moved to the Beamer Center). An early pamphlet described the new building and listed some rules for its use, such as No Rook Playing and No Playing of Boogie-Woogie, Jazz, or Otherwise Abusing the Piano. The MSC was remodeled during the Fall semester of 2007 for academic use and is now home to the Business Economics department, the Political Science and International Relations department, and the Wheaton College Center for Faith, Politics, and Economics.

Wheaton remodeled the MSC according to the U.S. Green Building Council's Leadership in Energy and Environmental Design (LEED). The MSC was the first building renovated according to these standards and exceeded existing EPA standards. Many of the materials used were post-consumer, and over 20% of the materials were manufactured within a 500-mile (800 km) radius of the College. The MSC remodeling is part of the current capital campaign, The Promise of Wheaton.

The Dining Hall (now the "Student Services Building") opened on January 4, 1953. Today it houses Student Development, Undergraduate Admissions, and the College Bookstore.

Jenks Hall is home to the Arena Theater, which was established in the Fall of 1974 and has staged over 100 full-length productions.

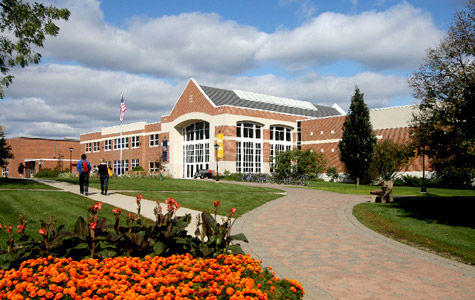
The Chrouser Sports Complex (CSC) features three student recreational gyms, an 8,000-square-foot weight room, an elevated jogging track, a climbing wall, "smart" classrooms, and conference rooms, and a new physiology lab.

In the fall of 2004, the Todd M. Beamer Student Center opened. Beamer, a Wheaton alumnus, was part of a small group of passengers who stormed hijackers on United Flight 93, bringing down the plane in rural Pennsylvania during the September 11, 2001, attacks, and preventing it from reaching its target. The building that bears his name was a $20+ million project commissioned to meet the needs of the growing college community. Along with its spacious and sleek modern design, the Beamer Center features a convenience store known as the "C-Store", the "Stupe" (the name derives from students shortening the previous nickname for the campus Student Union, "Stupid Onion", which in turn is a jocular mispronunciation of Student Union), a bakery café named "Sam's" (named after the former vice president of student development, Sam Shellhammer, who retired following the 2007–08 school year after serving Wheaton's campus community for thirty years), several reading rooms and lounges, a recreation/game room, a prayer chapel, an expanded college post office, the offices for several organizations and departments, and several other event rooms. In the fall of 2006, intense rain storms created a flood that destroyed the lower level of the Beamer Center. Wheaton College has since restored the flood-damaged building.

The official student newspaper at Wheaton College is the Wheaton Record, a weekly publication with a circulation of 3400, in existence since 1876. The Record is produced by students, published by the college, and distributed each Friday after chapel free of charge. The Record was the recipient of the 2006 John David Reed General Excellence Award and has received 13 other awards from the Illinois College Press Association, of which it is a member. The Record is also a member of the Associated Collegiate Press.

In addition, Wheaton College has many organizations on campus that range from helping the poor and needy in Chicago to the arts and improvisation.

Juniors and seniors are also eligible to live in one of thirteen campus houses, apartments (five complexes), or off-campus.

=== Spirituality ===
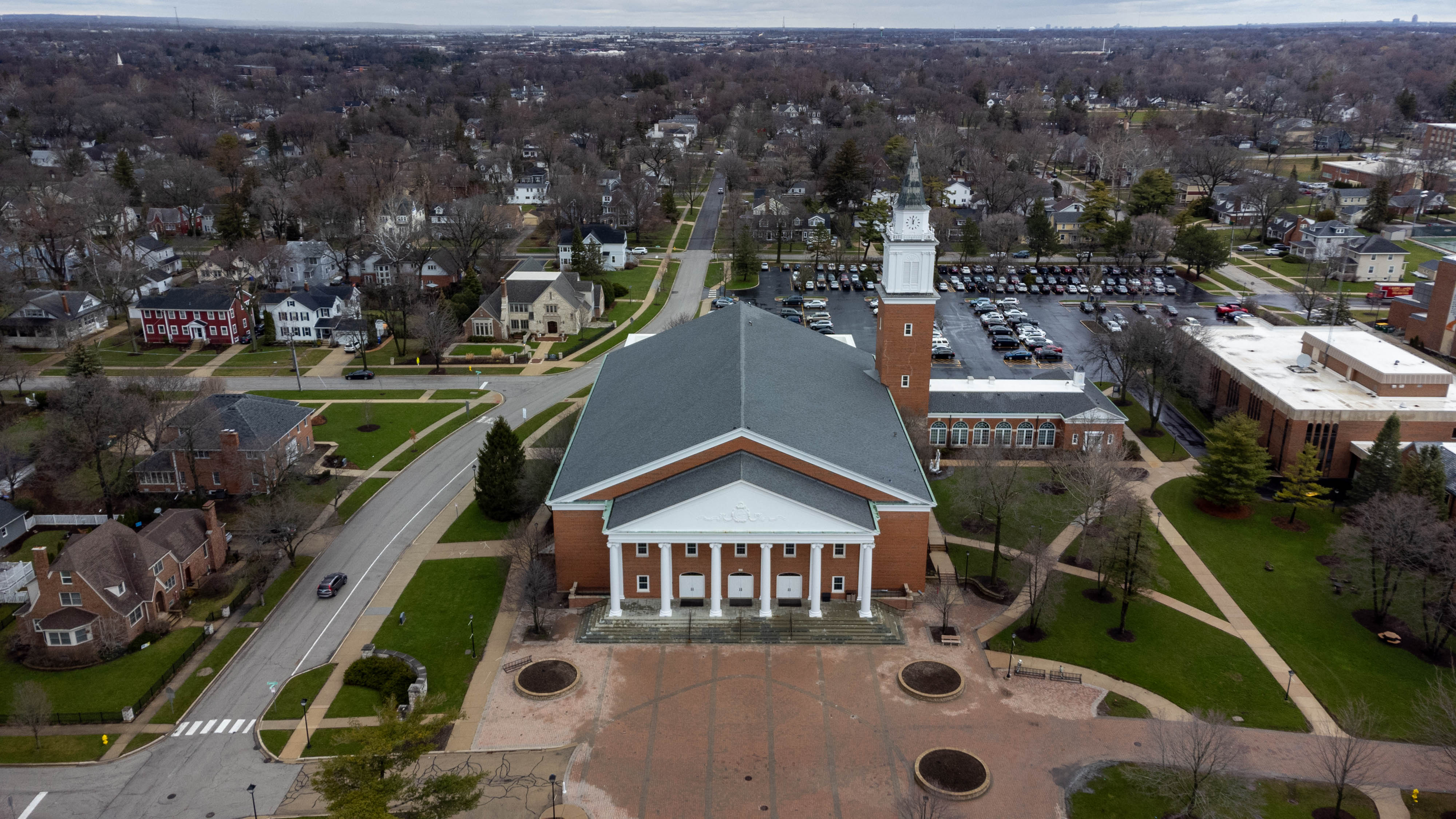
Edman Memorial Chapel at Wheaton College

The chapel, on the corner of Washington and Franklin streets, was dedicated on November 15, 1925. The college also used the building for commencements and other assemblies. In 1936–37, Wheaton renamed it the Orlinda Childs Pierce Memorial Chapel. Neighboring McAlister Hall was home to the Conservatory of Music and housed conservatory faculty offices.

College Church, across Washington Street from the college, is not formally associated with the college, although it has long been informally closely associated with the college.

The college holds regular chapel services in Edman Memorial Chapel, named for V. Raymond Edman, the fourth college president, which seats 2,400. Edman died in 1967 while speaking in chapel. He was preaching about being in the presence of the King, and the recording is available in the Wheaton chapel archives. The college also uses the chapel for many events of Wheaton's performing arts programs. In 2000, an entirely handcrafted organ made by the Casavant Organ Company of Quebec, Canada, was installed.

=== LGBT prohibition ===
Students and employees at Wheaton must sign a Community Covenant that classifies "homosexual behavior" as a form of immorality condemned by scripture which they must avoid. The college is listed among the least hospitable in the United States for LGBT students by Campus Pride and The Princeton Review because, among other reasons, the college featured an ex-gay movement speaker in a chapel service.

In 2011, a group of Wheaton alumni established OneWheaton, with the stated purpose of providing allied support to lesbian, gay, bisexual, transgender, and similar students and alums at Wheaton and other colleges.

In 2014 Wheaton hired a gay Christian blogger, Julie Rodgers, as a ministry associate who could reach out to LGBT students while being committed to celibacy. Rodgers reported that college officials asked her not to identify herself as gay and to portray being gay exclusively as a form of "brokenness" rather than something to be celebrated. Having shifted in her position on same-sex marriage, Rodgers could no longer personally endorse Wheaton's policy on sexual ethics, and consequentially resigned from Wheaton in 2015.

=== Other ===
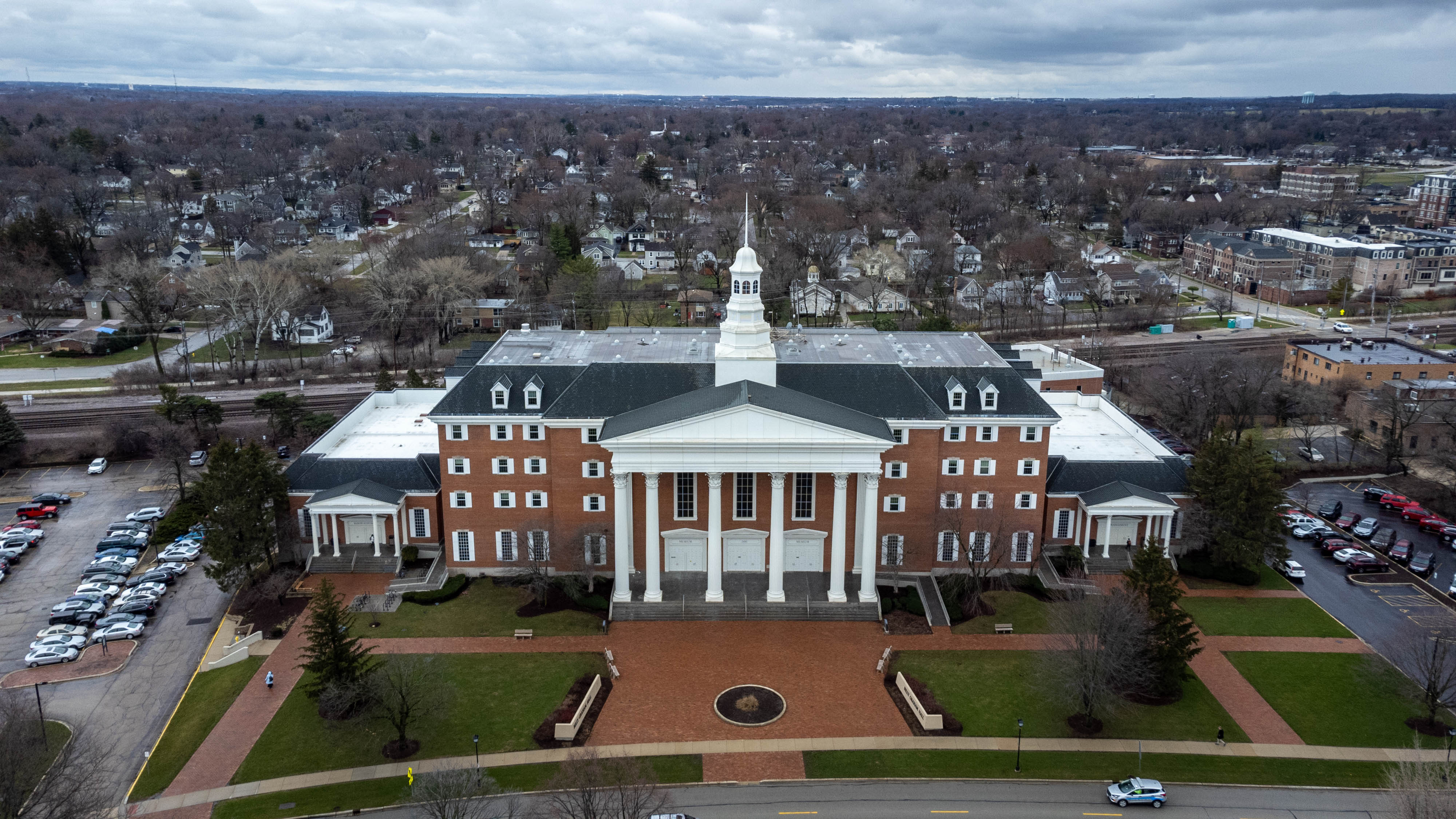
Billy Graham Hall at Wheaton College

The building was formally named the Billy Graham Center when it housed the evangelist's corporate records repository. But, in 2018, after Graham's death, the Billy Graham Evangelistic Association now spearheaded by Graham's son, Franklin, moved the archives to Charlotte, mainly due to disagreements about the culturally progressive leanings of the college. Though the Billy Graham Evangelistic Association raised the funds to build the building on Wheaton's Campus, it is now called "Billy Graham Hall". It does not represent the ministry in any way.

The BGC houses an auditorium, classrooms, several evangelism institutes, a museum of the history of evangelism, the college's Archives and Special Collections, and the Wheaton College Graduate School. It also housed the school radio station, WETN 88.1 FM, until its sale in February 2017.

The Women's Building renamed Williston Hall in 1930–31 (in honor of longtime Blanchard friend and donor J. P. Williston), was built in 1895. Its construction required the college to borrow $6,000. After seventy-eight years of housing only women, Williston Hall is now a coed dormitory for sophomore students. It opened to men starting in the fall semester of 2009 with the dream that it would become a creative hotspot on campus.

The President's House, or Westgate, formerly owned by college trustee John M. Oury, was presented to President Buswell on the tenth anniversary of his inauguration, April 23, 1936. The house served as the home of three of Wheaton's subsequent presidents. It now houses the Office of Alumni Relations.

In 1951, HoneyRock, Center for Leadership Development at Wheaton College, was established in Three Lakes, Wisconsin. HoneyRock is not only a year-round camp for young people, but it offers a variety of leadership schools and courses for students. Nearly 3,000 people utilize HoneyRock each year. Through HoneyRock the college owns nearly 800 acres (323.7 ha) in Northern Wisconsin.

In July 2012, Wheaton College filed a lawsuit alongside The Catholic University of America in the U.S. District Court for the District of Columbia, opposing the Health and Human Services Preventative Services regulation. The regulation, promulgated under the Patient Protection and Affordable Care Act, would have required both institutions to provide access to emergency contraceptive drugs or pay fines. The case was decided in favor of Wheaton College in 2018, resulting in an exemption from the mandate.

== Athletics ==
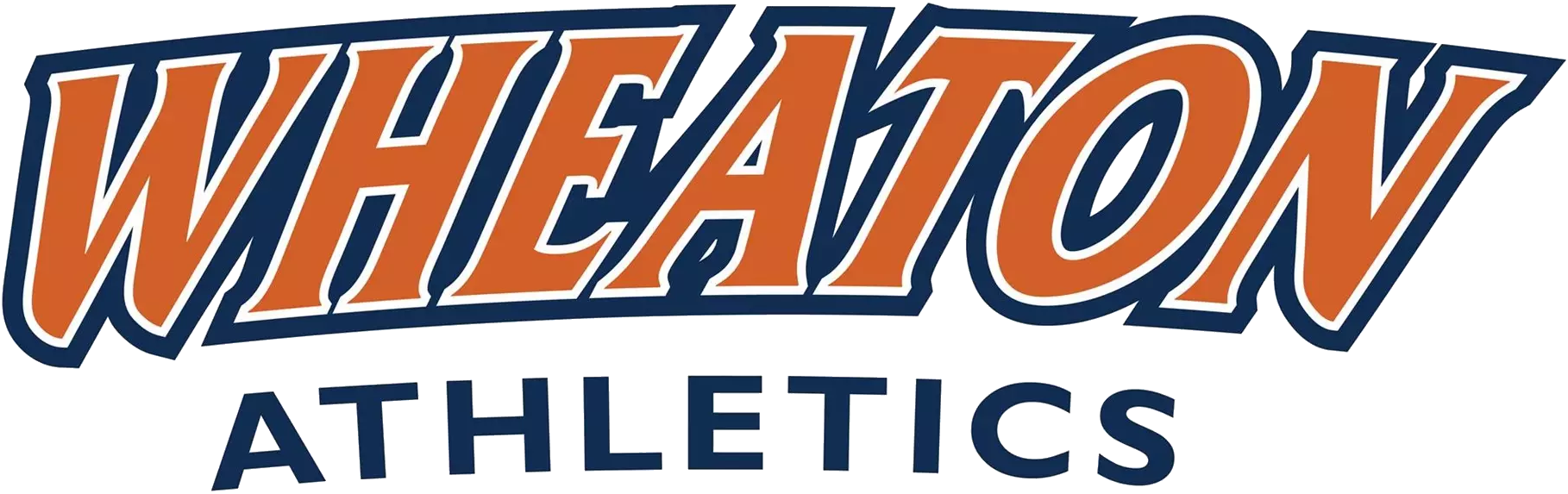
Wheaton athletics wordmark

Wheaton's athletic teams are the Thunder. The college is a member of the Division III level of the National Collegiate Athletic Association (NCAA), primarily competing in the College Conference of Illinois and Wisconsin (CCIW) since the 1967–68 academic year; which they were a member on a previous stint from 1946–47 to 1959–60. The Thunder previously competed in the Illinois Intercollegiate Athletic Conference (IIAC) from 1919–20 to 1936–37.

Wheaton competes in 19 intercollegiate varsity sports: Men's sports include baseball, basketball, cross country, football, golf, soccer, swimming & diving, tennis, track & field, and wrestling; while women's sports include basketball, cross country, golf, soccer, softball, swimming & diving, tennis, track & field, and volleyball. Wheaton also competes in men's and women's collegiate rowing, lacrosse, and club soccer.

Wheaton built a gymnasium, later renamed Adams Hall, in 1898. The college renovated it in early 2010 to house the Art Department. Alumni Gymnasium (renamed the Edward A. Coray Alumni Gymnasium in 1968, in honor of Coach Ed Coray's long service), was built during the Edman presidency and paid for by alums. The college laid the cornerstone at homecoming on October 11, 1941. The college placed a copper box in the cornerstone containing a copy of the Wheaton Record, the Wheaton Daily Journal, a college catalog, a student directory, and a copy of the Homecoming program. Wyngarten Health Center was built in 1958, followed by Centennial Gymnasium in 1959–60, which was extensively renovated and expanded in 2000. Now known as King Arena, it is part of the Chrouser Sports Complex (CSC) and houses most of the college's athletic and fitness facilities.

=== Accomplishments ===
The men's basketball team won the first NCAA College Division National Championship in 1957, defeating Kentucky Wesleyan in the finals, 89–65. The Wheaton men's soccer team captured the NCAA Division III Men's Soccer Championship in 1984 and 1997, to go with runner-up finishes in 1999, 2006, and 2014. The women's soccer team won the NCAA Division III Women's Soccer Championship in 2004, 2006, and 2007. Wheaton athletes competed in basketball at the 1904 Summer Olympics. The 1967–68 women's basketball team finished their season undefeated in 11 games, including a victory over the University of Iowa.

Gil Dodds (MA '48), the one-time world record holder for the indoor mile, NCAA cross country champion, and three-time Wanamaker Mile champion, coached men's track & field at Wheaton in the late 1940s and 1950s.

=== Rowing ===
Wheaton College Crew is the official collegiate rowing club of Wheaton College. Wheaton Crew was established in 1989 by Rachel Mariner '89 who had returned from her junior year at Exeter College, Oxford. It was first solely women's crew using the University of Chicago boathouse. Later a group of students, alumni, and donors competing with both men's and women's boats; both crews are members of the American Collegiate Rowing Association (ACRA) in the Great Lakes Region. The Wheaton College Crew is registered as a club sport affiliated with Wheaton College Thunder Athletics. The club program is currently the highest level of competitive rowing offered at Wheaton College.

The crew team rows on the Fox River from the dock of Fox Valley Christian Action's Riverwoods Campus in St. Charles, Illinois. The Fox is shared with the St. Charles Rowing Club (SCRC) on a residential, no-wake 7 km stretch of river. While no boathouse has been established due to complications with Wheaton College, Wheaton Crew hosts land practices, ergometer training, and tryouts in the Chrouser Sports Complex on Wheaton's campus.

Wheaton Crew competes and trains for Head Races in the fall season and 2 km sprints in the spring. Wheaton competes in regattas including the Head of the Hooch, Head of the Charles Regatta and the John Hunter Regatta on Lake Lanier's Olympic Park and the Illinois Collegiate Rowing Invitational in Farmer City, Illinois. It does not compete on Sunday in agreement with Wheaton College and Wheaton College Thunder regulations.

The Wheaton Crew Cheer is a long-standing oral tradition of Wheaton oarsmen at the launch of Wheaton boats at regattas. As a strictly oral tradition, this cheer cannot be written down for any purpose. Memorizing the cheer is a rite of passage for Wheaton rowers.

At the transition of captains, both the Men's and Women's captains are given the first flag and oar of Wheaton Crew as a symbol of power passing from one generation of Wheaton rowers to another. The team introduced the Golden Cox-Tool in 2017 as a similar relic for the Head Coxswain's transition.

The 1939 hymn "Victory in Jesus" is sung at the end of every Wheaton Crew racing event following Wheaton College's affiliations as an Evangelical Christian establishment.

== Notable alumni ==
- Todd Beamer – software salesperson & passenger on United Airlines Flight 93 during the September 11 attacks
- Rob Bell – author, speaker, podcaster, and founder/former pastor of Mars Hill Bible Church in Michigan
- Suessa Baldridge Blaine – writer of temperance pageants
- William Lane Craig – apologist, professor of philosophy at Talbot School of Theology, author of the Kalam Cosmological Argument
- Wesley Earl Craven – prominent film director, writer, producer, and actor known for contributions to the horror genre
- Bart D. Ehrman – American New Testament scholar focusing on textual criticism of the New Testament, the historical Jesus, and the origins and development of early Christianity
- Philip James "Jim" Elliot – martyred missionary to Ecuador
- Michael Gerson – speechwriter for President George W. Bush
- Bill Gothard – evangelist and educator
- Billy Graham – prominent Christian evangelist
- Jason Harrod – singer/songwriter
- David Iglesias – Judge Advocate (JAG), at the Pentagon, member of the legal team that was the inspiration for the film A Few Good Men, United States Attorney for the District of New Mexico
- Robert W. Lane – former CEO of John Deere
- Josh McDowell – evangelical Christian apologist author
- Mark Noll – historian and author
- Zac Niringiye – Masters in Theology – Ugandan Anglican Bishop and activist
- C. Herbert Oliver – civil rights activist
- Sophy Parfin – entomologist
- John Piper – Reformed Baptist theologian and founder of the Christian hedonism movement
- Philip Ryken – president of Wheaton College
- Edward Breathitte Sellers - one of Illinois' first black college graduates (1866)
- Robert Van Kampen – founder of mutual fund company Van Kampen Investments
- Russell Vought – director of the Office of Management and Budget under the Trump administration
