= Hudson Armerding =

Hudson Taylor Armerding
- Born: June 21, 1918; Albuquerque, New Mexico, US
- Died: December 1, 2009 (aged 91); Carol Stream, Illinois
- Occupations: Educator, historian, professor, college president
- Known for: President of Wheaton College (1965–1982), President of National Association of Evangelicals (NAE) (1970–1972), major building program at Wheaton College, steering a small liberal arts college through anti-war protests in Vietnam Era

Hudson Taylor Armerding (June 21, 1918 – December 1, 2009) was President of Wheaton College, Wheaton, Illinois, from 1965 to 1982. He was also president of the National Association of Evangelicals from 1970 to 1972.

== Biography ==
Born in Albuquerque, New Mexico, Armerding was the son of an itinerant preacher and grew up in a variety of places in the Southwest U.S. His high school graduation in San Diego, California was in 1935. For two years after his high school graduation, he lived in Wellington, New Zealand, working on a farm.

Armerding earned an undergraduate degree in history from Wheaton in 1941, where he was a classmate and good friend of Billy Graham (who had transferred in to Wheaton from Bob Jones University via the Florida Bible Institute), and received a master's degree in international affairs from Clark University in 1942.

In World War II, Armerding served as a line officer in the Pacific Ocean aboard the heavy cruiser USS Wichita, which participated in 11 naval engagements, including the invasion of Okinawa. After the war, Armerding helped liberate a Japanese prisoner-of-war camp near Nagasaki.

In 1948, Armerding earned a doctorate (PhD) in history at the University of Chicago.

From 1949 until 1961, Armerding taught and served as a dean and eventually acting president at Gordon College and Gordon Seminary in Wenham, Mass. In 1961, he was appointed professor of history at Wheaton and a year later, in 1962, became Provost.

In 1965, Armerding succeeded the retiring V. Raymond Edman as Wheaton's president and Edman became Chancellor.

During Armerding's Presidency, Wheaton College constructed a new library and a new science building, eventually renamed Armerding Hall. Armerding retired from Wheaton in 1982.

Armerding served as a vice president of the Quarryville Presbyterian Retirement Community in Quarryville, Pennsylvania from 1985 until 1999.

In 2007, he was moved to Windsor Park Manor in Carol Stream, Illinois, where he battled with dementia until his death (in his home) in 2009.

== See also ==
- List of Wheaton College (Illinois) alumni

Academic offices
Preceded by V. Raymond Edman	President of Wheaton College; 1965–1982	Succeeded by J. Richard Chase
