= Charles A. Blanchard (academic administrator) =

Second president of Wheaton College

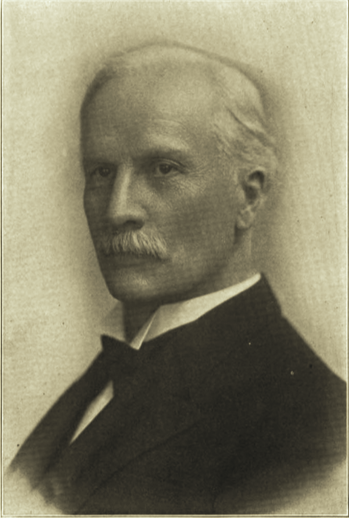
At age 65

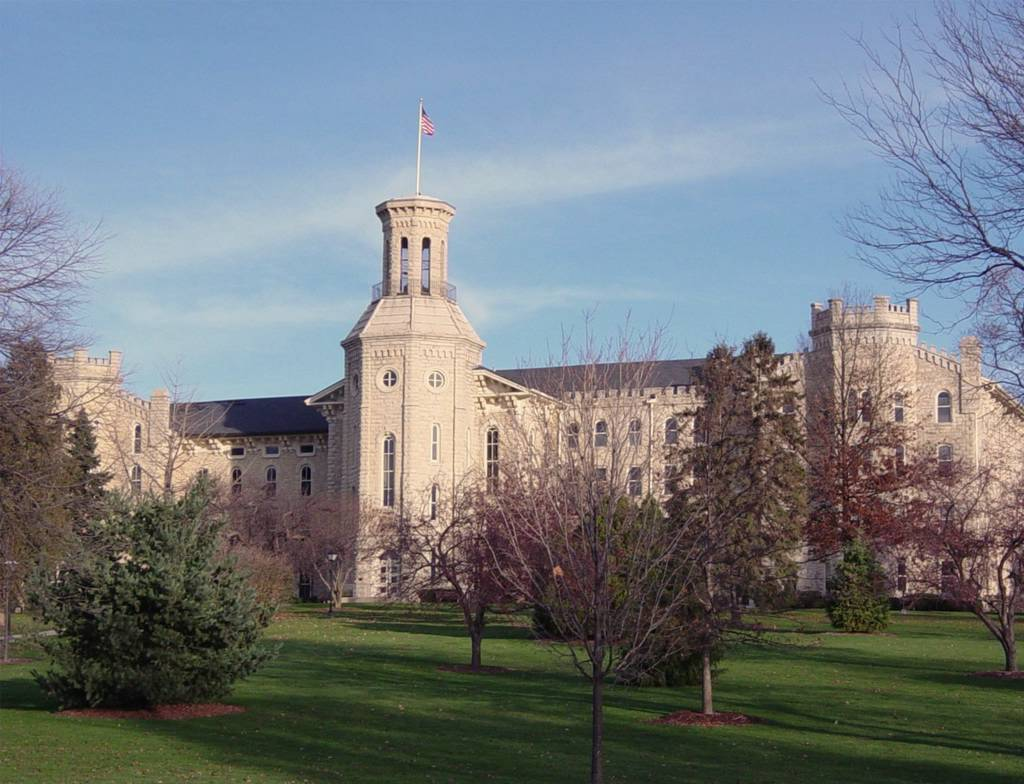
Blanchard Hall, Wheaton College

Charles A. Blanchard (November 8, 1848 – December 20, 1925) was the second president of Wheaton College in Wheaton, Illinois. He succeeded his father, Jonathan Blanchard, to the office in 1882 and served Wheaton in that capacity until his death, in 1925. He also served for two years as senior pastor of the Moody Church in Chicago.

Named after the King of Sardinia, Charles Albert Blanchard was ten years old when his father left the Galesburg, Illinois area to assume the presidency of the Illinois Institute, which was soon to become Wheaton College. During his youth, Charles had a close perspective on the efforts of his father and his tenure as president. This gave the younger Blanchard a solid foundation upon which to build his 43-year administration.

Frank Earl Herrick of the 1899 graduating class composed a poem in Blanchard's honor.

== Ancestry ==
Ancestors of Charles A. Blanchard (academic administrator)

4. Jonathan Blanchard
2. Jonathan Blanchard
5. Mary Lovell
1. Charles A. Blanchard
6. Samuel Bent
3. Mary Avery Bent

Academic offices
Preceded by Jonathan Blanchard	President of Wheaton College; 1882–1925	Succeeded by J. Oliver Buswell
