= Ed Stetzer =

American Christian evangelical (born 1966)

Edward J. "Ed" Stetzer
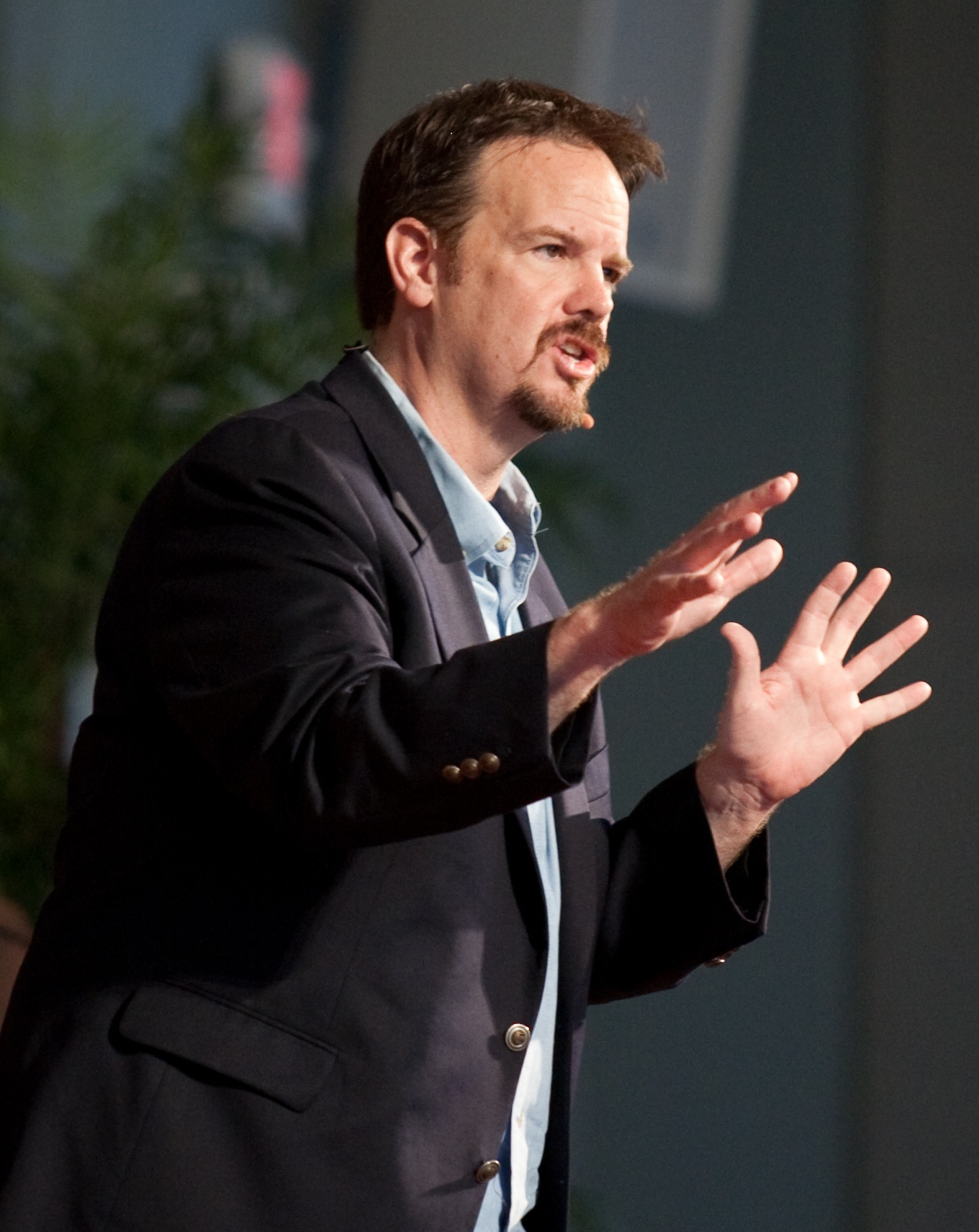
- Born: September 2, 1966 (age 59); Long Island, New York, U.S.
- Education: Liberty University (MA); Southern Baptist Theological Seminary (MDiv, PhD); Beeson Divinity School (DMin)
- Occupations: Missiologist, author, pastor, educator
- Years active: 1990s–present
- Organizations: Talbot School of Theology (Biola University); Billy Graham Center (Wheaton College); Lausanne Movement; Outreach Magazine; LifeWay Research
- Notable work: Planting Missional Churches (2006); Transformational Church (2010); Compelled by Love (2012); Subversive Kingdom (2012); Christians in the Age of Outrage (2018)
- Spouse: Donna Stetzer
- Children: Three

Edward John Stetzer (born 1966) is an American author, pastor, and Christian missiologist. He is Dean and Professor of Leadership and Christian Ministry at Talbot School of Theology at Biola University. Previously, he served as the Billy Graham Distinguished Chair for Church, Mission, and Evangelism at Wheaton College. He also serves as Distinguished Visiting Scholar at Wycliffe Hall at Oxford University. Stetzer is Regional Director for Lausanne North America and editor-in-chief of Outreach. Stetzer has written for USA Today and CNN.

== Early life and education ==
Stetzer was born in Long Island and grew up Catholic in Levittown, New York, outside New York City. He holds a bachelor's degree from Shorter University, master's degrees from Liberty University School of Divinity and the Southern Baptist Theological Seminary, a Doctor of Ministry from Beeson Divinity School, and a Ph.D. from the Southern Baptist Theological Seminary.

== Ministry ==
Stetzer was Executive Director of LifeWay Research, a division of LifeWay Christian Resources, and LifeWay's Missiologist in Residence. He worked as Dean of the Graduate School of Mission, Ministry, and Leadership, as well as Professor, Church, Mission, and Evangelism at Wheaton College and Executive Director of the Billy Graham Center at Wheaton. He has also served as Director of Research and Missiologist-In-Residence for the North American Mission Board.

Stetzer served as interim senior pastor at Moody Church in Chicago from 2016 to 2020, after the retirement of longtime pastor Erwin Lutzer.

Stetzer became Visiting Professor of Research and Missiology at Trinity Evangelical Divinity School in 2019.

== Published books ==
- Planting New Churches in a Postmodern Age (B&H Publishing Group, 2003)
- Perimeters of Light: Biblical Boundaries for the Emerging Church, with Elmer Towns, Moody Publishing, 2004)
- Breaking the Missional Code (with David Putman; B&H Publishing Group, 2006)
- Planting Missional Churches (B&H Publishers, 2006)
- Comeback Churches, with Mike Dodson (B&H Publishing Group, 2007)
- 11 Innovations in the Local Church, with Elmer Towns and Warren Bird; Regal Publishing, 2007)
- Compelled by Love: The Most Excellent Way to Missional Living, with Philip Nation (New Hope Publishers, 2008)
- Lost and Found: The Younger Unchurched and the Churches that Reach Them, with Richie Stanley and Jason Hayes (B&H Publishers, 2009)
- MissionShift: Global Mission Issues in the Third Millennium, with David Hesselgrave (B&H Publishing Group, 2010)
- Viral Churches: Helping Church Planters Become Movement Makers, with Warren Bird (Jossey-Bass, 2010)
- Transformational Church: Creating a New Scorecard for Congregations, with Thom S. Rainer (B&H Publishing Group, 2010)
- Subversive Kingdom: Living as Agents of Gospel Transformation (B&H Publishing Group, 2012)
- Compelled: Living the Mission of God, with Philip Nation (New Hope Publishers, 2012)
- The Mission of God Study Bible, with Philip Nation (B&H Publishing Group, 2012)
- Transformational Groups: Creating a New Scorecard for Groups, with Eric Geiger (B&H Publishing Group, 2014)
- Igrejas que transformam o Brasil: sinais de um movimento revolucionário e inspirador, with Sérgio Queiroz (Mundo Cristão, 2017)
- Christians in the Age of Outrage: How to Bring Our Best When the World is at its Worst (Tyndale, 2018)
