= Mark L. Strauss =

American scholar and educator

- Strauss in 2019
- Born: November 16, 1959 (age 66)
- Occupation: Biblical scholar
- Board member of: Committee on Bible Translation for the New International Version
- Spouse: Roxanne
- Children: 3

Academic background
- Education: Westmont College, Talbot School of Theology
- Alma mater: University of Aberdeen (PhD)

Academic work
- Institutions: Biola University; Christian Heritage College; Talbot School of Theology; Bethel Seminary
- Website: MarkLStrauss.com

Mark Lehman Strauss is an American biblical scholar and University Professor of New Testament Emeritus at Bethel Seminary of Bethel University, St. Paul, Minnesota. His areas of expertise include New Testament Gospels, Hermeneutics, and Bible translation. Particularly noteworthy is his work on gender-related language in Scripture.

== Background and education ==
Strauss is the son of pastor and author Richard L. Strauss (d. 1993) and grandson of Lehman Strauss (d. 1997), pastor, author and conference speaker. Mark was born in Fort Worth, Texas and spent his grade school years in Huntsville, Alabama, where his father served as pastor of several churches. In 1972, Richard was called to be senior pastor of Emmanuel Faith Community Church, and the family moved to Escondido, California. Richard served there for twenty-one years until his death from cancer in 1993.

Mark earned his B.A. in psychology from Westmont College in 1982 and then turned to theology and New Testament, receiving an M.Div. in 1985 and a Th.M. in 1988, both from Talbot School of Theology of Biola University in La Mirada, CA. Strauss married Roxanne Lynne Hogeland in 1984 and they moved to Aberdeen, Scotland, where he completed a Ph.D. in New Testament from the University of Aberdeen. His thesis concerned the theme of the Messiah from the line of David in the writings of Luke. His thesis advisor was Max Turner, with I. Howard Marshall acting as external reviewer and C. K. Barrett as external reviewer.

== Professional life ==
Returning to the United States in 1992, Strauss taught at Talbot School of Theology and Christian Heritage College before being appointed Associate Professor of New Testament at Bethel Seminary. He taught at Bethel's San Diego campus from 1993 until its closure in 2019, and then online until his retirement in 2025.

Strauss is perhaps best known in the academic world for his Gospels textbook, Four Portraits, One Jesus. A Survey of Jesus and the Gospels and for his work in Bible translation. The latter was sparked by a controversy that rocked the evangelical world in 1997 related to the New International Version (NIV), the most popular English translation of the Bible. World magazine, a Christian news magazine, published a series of articles severely criticizing the International Bible Society (now Biblica), the copyright holder of the NIV, and Zondervan, the primary publisher, for their plans to introduce gender-inclusive language into the NIV. Critics claimed that such language represented a feminist distortion of the biblical text. A number of evangelical leaders, led by James Dobson, came together to produce what came to be known as the Colorado Springs Guidelines, a series of guidelines intended to limit the use of gender-inclusive language.

At the annual meeting of the Evangelical Theological Society, November 20–22 1997 in Santa Clara, California, Strauss presented a paper responding to the Colorado Springs Guidelines, entitled, "Linguistic and Hermeneutical Fallacies in the Guidelines Established at the ‘Conference on Gender-Related Language in Scripture’." In it he argued that the gender-inclusive changes being introduced into the NIV were in line with the version's meaning-based translation philosophy. Strauss argued that when the author was referring to both men and women, using words like "person" and "human being" were more precise and so more accurate than "man." The paper was subsequently published in the Journal of the Evangelical Theological Society (JETS) together with a response by Wayne Grudem, one of the strongest critics of gender-inclusive language. Strauss subsequently wrote a book on the topic, Distorting Scripture? The Challenge of Bible Translation and Gender Accuracy and engaged in a number of forums and debates on gender-related language in the Bible. Some other evangelical biblical scholars who similarly affirmed the use of gender-inclusive language in Bible translation included D. A. Carson, Darrell L. Bock, Craig Blomberg, and Grant R. Osborne. The strongest opponents were Wayne Grudem and Vern Poythress.

In 2005 Strauss was invited to join the Committee on Bible Translation (CBT) for the New International Version. He served as Vice Chair of the committee from 2010 to 2024. In addition to his teaching and writing, Strauss served in various interim pastoral roles and taught the Cove Bible study at the Church at Rancho Bernardo for ten years (2009-2019). He also served on the board of Bible Study Fellowship from 2019 to 2025 and as part of the theological advisory team for Young Life.

== Personal and family life ==
Mark's wife Roxanne Lynne Strauss is a marriage and family therapist, specializing in Internal Family Systems (IFS), with training in Eye Movement Desensitization and Reprocessing (EMDR). They have three grown children.

== Selected works ==
=== Books ===
- Strauss, Mark L. (1995). The Davidic Messiah in Luke-Acts: the promise and its fulfillment in Lukan Christology. Journal for the study of the New Testament, Supplement Series. Vol. 110. Sheffield, England: Sheffield Academic Press. ISBN 978-1-850-75522-7. OCLC 32434685. - a revision of his PhD thesis
- ——— (1997). Linguistic and hermeneutical fallacies in the guidelines established at the (so-called) "Conference on Gender-Related Languages in Scripture". Evangelical Theological Society Papers. Vol. ETS-4918. Evangelical Theological Society. OCLC 39638873.
- ——— (1998). Distorting Scripture?: The Challenge of Bible Translation & Gender Accuracy. Downers Grove, IL: InterVarsity Press. ISBN 978-0-830-81940-9. OCLC 38908817.
- ——— (1999). Inclusive Language in Bible Translation. Evangelical Theological Society Papers. Vol. ETS-0711. Evangelical Theological Society. OCLC 45092417.
- ——— (1999). Evangelical Theology for the Third Millennium: truth and relevance. Evangelical Theological Society Papers. Vol. ETS-0174. Evangelical Theological Society. OCLC 45092408.
- ——— (2006). Truth and Error in the Da Vinci Code: The Facts about Jesus and Christian Origins. San Diego, CA: Alethinos Books. ISBN 978-0-977-98691-0.
- ———; Walton, John H.; Cooper, Ted (2006). The Essential Bible Companion: key insights for reading God's word. Grand Rapids, MI: Zondervan. ISBN 978-0-310-26662-4. OCLC 59712311.
- ——— (2020). Four Portraits, One Jesus: A Survey of Jesus and the Gospels, 2nd edition. Grand Rapids, MI: Zondervan. ISBN 978-0-310-22697-0. OCLC 62493214.
- ———; Fee, Gordon D. (2007). How to Choose a Translation for All Its Worth: A Guide to Understanding and Using Bible Versions. Grand Rapids, MI: Zondervan. ISBN 978-0-310-27876-4. OCLC 154677333.
- ———; Burge, Gary M. (2009). John: Meet God Face to Face. NLT Study Series. Tyndale House. ISBN 978-1-414-32196-7.
- ——— (2011). How to Read the Bible in Changing Times: Understanding and Applying God's Word Today. Grand Rapids, MI: Baker Books. ISBN 978-0-8010-7283-3.
- ——— (2014). Mark. Zondervan Exegetical Commentary on the New Testament. Vol. 2. Grand Rapids, MI: Zondervan. ISBN 978-0-310-24358-8. OCLC 863695341.
- ——— (2015). Jesus Behaving Badly: the puzzling paradoxes of the man from Galilee. Downers Grove, IL: Inter-Varsity Press. ISBN 978-0-830-82466-3. OCLC 909328973.

=== Edited ===
- ———; Scorgie, Glen G.; Voth, Steven M., eds. (2003). The Challenge of Bible Translation: communicating God's Word to the world: essays in honor of Ronald F. Youngblood. Grand Rapids, MI: Zondervan. ISBN 978-0-310-24685-5. OCLC 51446617.
- Wenham, Gordon J.; Heth, William A.; Keener, Craig S. (2006). ——— (ed.). Remarriage After Divorce in Today's Church: 3 Views. Grand Rapids, MI: Zondervan. ISBN 978-0-310-25553-6. OCLC 62509067.

=== Chapters and articles ===
- ——— (June 1998). "Linguistic and Hermeneutical Fallacies in the Guidelines Established at the 'Conference on Gender-Related Language in Scripture'". Journal of the Evangelical Theological Society. 41 (2): 239–262.
- ——— (1999). "Are Earthquakes Signs of the End Times? A Geological and Biblical Response to an Urban Legend". Christian Research Journal. 21 (4).
- ——— (2000). "The Inclusive Language Debate: How Should the Bible Be Translated Today?". Christian Research Journal. 22 (4).
- ——— (2002). "Luke". In Arnold, Clinton E. (ed.). Zondervan Illustrated Bible Background Commentary: Volume 1: Matthew, Mark, Luke. Grand Rapids, MI: Zondervan. ISBN 978-0-310-21806-7.
- ——— (7 October 2002). "The TNIV Debate. Is this new translation faithful in its treatment of gender?". Christianity Today. 46 (11): 36–45.
- ——— (July 2005). "Form, Function and the Literal Meaning Fallacy in English Bible Translation". The Bible Translator. 56 (3): 153–168. doi:10.1177/026009350505600305. S2CID 171714774.
- ——— (Winter 2008). "Rolling out the Dead Sea Scrolls". Heart and Mind. 21 (1): 18–22.
- ——— (2010). "Mark". In Longman III, Tremper; Garland, David E. (eds.). Expositor's Bible Commentary, Revised Edition. Vol. 9. Grand Rapids, MI: Zondervan. ISBN 978-0-310-26892-5.
- ——— (Spring 2011). "Bible Translation and the Myth of 'Literal Accuracy'". Review and Expositor. 108 (2): 169–193. doi:10.1177/003463731110800204. S2CID 143826797.
- ——— (2012). "Gender-language Issues in the NIV 2011. A Response to Vern Poythress". Westminster Theological Journal. 74 (1).
