= Robert Partridge =

Robert Partridge may refer to:

- Robert Partridge (Egyptologist) ( – 10 July 2011), British Egyptologist
- Robert Partridge (writer) (c. 1954 – ), English crime fiction writer
- Rob Partridge (11 September 1985 – ), British cyclist
