= Robert L. Saucy =

American biblical scholar and academic (1930-2015)

Robert Lloyd Saucy
- Born: May 1, 1930; Salem, Oregon
- Died: March 12, 2015 (aged 84)
- Occupations: Biblical scholar and professor of systematic theology
- Spouse: Nancy

Academic background
- Education: George Fox College, Westmont College
- Alma mater: Dallas Theological Seminary (Th.M, Th.D)
- Thesis: The doctrine of the church as a seed of Abraham (1958, Th.M), The relationship of dispensationalism to the eternal purpose of God (1961, Th.D)

Academic work
- Institutions: Rosemead Graduate School of Psychology; Talbot School of Theology

Robert Lloyd Saucy (May 1, 1930 – March 12, 2015) was an American biblical scholar and professor of systematic theology.

== Biography ==
Saucy was born in Salem, Oregon, and educated at George Fox College (1949–51) and Westmont College (1951–53), earning his A.B. in history. He went on to earn both his Th.M. (1958) and Th.D. (1961) in systematic theology at Dallas Theological Seminary. While completing his graduate studies at Dallas, Saucy served as part-time instructor at the Southern Bible Training Institute, and as part-time pastor at Milligan Bible Church. He was ordained as a minister in the North American Baptist General Conference.

In 1961, Saucy joined the faculty of Talbot School of Theology, where he was appointed distinguished professor of systematic theology in 1989. He was a long-time member of the Evangelical Theological Society, and served as its president in 1972. Saucy was one of only three scholars who worked on both the original 1971 translation of the New American Standard Bible as well as the 1995 update. He was also a faculty member at Rosemead Graduate School of Psychology from 1970 to 1977.

He died March 12, 2015, from injuries sustained in a car accident. "Minding the Heart: The Way of Spiritual Transformation," published in October, 2013 - and dedicated to his wife, Nancy - was his last book published before his death.

== Works ==
=== Books ===
- Saucy, Robert L. (1972). The Church in God's Program. Chicago, IL: Moody Press. ISBN 0-8024-1544-X. OCLC 378985.
- ———; Shelley, Bruce L. (1978). The Bible: Breathed from God. Victor know & believe series. Wheaton, IL: Victor Books. ISBN 0-88207-778-3. OCLC 4499459.
- ——— (1978). Is the Bible reliable?. Basic doctrine series. Wheaton, IL: Victor Books. OCLC 10612740.
- ——— (1983). A rationale for the future of Israel. Evangelical Theological Society papers. Vol. ETS-1084. Publisher=Evangelical Theological Society. OCLC 18043972.
- ——— (1983). The time of the fulfillment of the messianic prophecies. Evangelical Theological Society papers. Vol. ETS-1094. Publisher=Evangelical Theological Society. OCLC 17673125.
- ——— (1989). The Mystery of Ephesians Three. Evangelical Theological Society papers. Vol. ETS-0124. Publisher=Evangelical Theological Society. OCLC 20155207.
- ——— (1992). Woman's prohibition to teach men : an investigation into its meaning and contemporary application. Evangelical Theological Society papers. Vol. ETS-4416. Publisher=Evangelical Theological Society. OCLC 28961211.
- ——— (1993). The Case for Progressive Dispensationalism. Grand Rapids, MI: Zondervan. ISBN 0-310-30441-5. OCLC 27173203.
- ——— (1994). Sinners who are forgiven, or saints who sin?. Evangelical Theological Society papers. Vol. ETS-4615. Publisher=Evangelical Theological Society. OCLC 34307287.
- ———; Grudem, Wayne; Oss, Doug; Storms, Sam (1996). Are Miraculous Gifts for Today?: Four Views. Counterpoints: Bible and Theology. Grand Rapids, MI: Zondervan. ISBN 0-310-20155-1.
- ———; Anderson, Neil T. (1997). The Common Made Holy (1st ed.). Eugene, OR: Harvest House. ISBN 978-1-5650-7290-9. OCLC 35593435.)
- ———; Anderson, Neil T.; Park, David (1998). Radical image!. Eugene, OR: Harvest House. ISBN 978-1-5650-7908-3. OCLC 39060632.
- ———; Anderson, Neil T.; Park, David (1999). Higher Ground : taking faith to the edge!. Eugene, OR: Harvest House. ISBN 978-0-7369-0066-9. OCLC 40193497.
- ———; TenElshof, Judith K., eds. (2001). Men and Women in Ministry: A Complementary Perspective. Chicago, IL: Moody Press. ISBN 978-0-802-45291-7. OCLC 45958037. - author of chapters within
- ———; Anderson, Neil T.; Park, David (2001). Sold out for God. Eugene, OR: Harvest House. ISBN 9780736907088. OCLC 46951956.
- ——— (2001). Scripture: Its Authority, Power and Relevance. Swindoll leadership library. Nashville, TN: Word Publishing. ISBN 978-0-8499-1367-9. OCLC 46872194.
- ———; Anderson, Neil T. (2001). God's Power at Work in You: Unleashing the Fullness of God's Power (revised ed.). Monarch Books. ISBN 978-1854245663.) - a revision of The Common Made Holy
- ———; Anderson, Neil T. (2004). Unleashing God's power in you. Bondage breaker series. Eugene, OR: Harvest House Publishers. ISBN 978-0-7369-1442-0. OCLC 55067124.
- ——— (2013). Minding the Heart: The Way of Spiritual Formation. Grand Rapids, MI: Kregel Publications. ISBN 978-0825436659.
- ———; Brand, Chad O.; Pratt, Tom; Reymond, Robert L.; Thomas, Robert L. (2015). Brand, Chad O. (ed.). Perspectives on Israel and the Church: Four Views. Nashville, TN: B & H Publishing. ISBN 978-0-805-44526-8. OCLC 881665297.
