= Talbot School of Theology =

Evangelical theological seminary near Los Angeles, California

Coordinates: 33.906472°N 118.017932°W

- Former names: Talbot Theological Seminary
- Established: 1952
- Parent institution: Biola University
- Affiliations: Nondenominational
- President: Barry H. Corey
- Dean: Ed Stetzer
- Academic staff: 52
- Administrative staff: 15
- Students: 1,800 (La Mirada: 1,500)
- Location: La Mirada, California, U.S.
- Website: biola.edu/talbot

Talbot School of Theology is an evangelical Christian theological seminary located near Los Angeles. Talbot is one of the nine schools of Biola University, located in La Mirada, California. Talbot is nondenominational and known for its conservative theological positions, particularly its historical adherence to biblical inerrancy.

The seminary has two campuses: Los Angeles (La Mirada) and Phoenix (Scottsdale), with extension sites in San Diego, Las Vegas, Hawaii, and Seattle. With a combined enrollment of 1,800, Talbot is the second largest nondenominational seminary in the world.

== History ==
In 1952, during the last year of his second term as Biola's president, Louis Talbot worked to establish a fully accredited theological seminary. The seminary's first dean was Charles L. Feinberg, who, along with his colleagues, unanimously voted to name the seminary "Talbot Theological Seminary." In 1981, the seminary's name was changed to "Talbot School of Theology" when Biola moved from college to university status.

Talbot is known for its conservative theology, especially related to the doctrine of biblical inerrancy and premillennial eschatology.

With attendance declining since 2020 to approximately 300 students and a multi-million dollar budget deficit the board of Phoenix Seminary reached out to Biola about acquiring the seminary for free and merging it with Talbot.

In June 2026 both institutions announced the merger and that the seminary would be renamed Talbot Seminary Phoenix with classes expected to begin in August. The combined school will enroll more than 1,800 graduate students, making it the second largest nondenominational evangelical seminary in the world, behind only Dallas Theological Seminary.

== Academics ==
Talbot first became accredited in 1978 by Association of Theological Schools in the United States and Canada. Talbot has more than 1,200 students, 70 full-time faculty members, 50 part-time faculty, and offers nine master's degrees and five doctoral degrees. Ed Stetzer is Talbot's seventh and current dean, serving since 2023.

== Notable alumni ==
- Neil T. Anderson – Founder of Freedom in Christ ministry, best-selling author, well-known conference speaker.
- Kenton Beshore – Former Senior Pastor, Mariners Church in Irvine, California, currently the 41st largest church in the United States and 2nd largest in California
- Michael Chang – Former professional tennis player from the United States.
- Clyde Cook - Former president of Biola University
- F. David Farnell – Former Professor of New Testament at The Master's Seminary and Director of the Redeemer Center for Church Leadership
- R. Kent Hughes – Editor and contributor, Preaching the Word commentary series, Senior Pastor Emeritus, College Church, Wheaton, Illinois
- Greg Koukl – Christian speaker, radio talk show host, apologist, and president of Stand to Reason ministries.
- Andy Luckey – producer for the 80s and 90s series Teenage Mutant Ninja Turtles and Adventures from the Book of Virtues
- John F. MacArthur – Evangelical writer, pastor, and chancellor of The Master's University and The Master's Seminary
- Josh McDowell – Christian author and pastor
- Frank Pastore – Christian radio host The Frank Pastore Show, KKLA 99.5 FM
- Danny Yamashiro – Chaplain at Massachusetts Institute of Technology (MIT), researcher on American presidents and childhood trauma, and media talk show host
- David Alan Black - Professor of New Testament and Greek at Southeastern Baptist Theological Seminary
- Mark L. Strauss - Professor of New Testament at Bethel Seminary San Diego
- Kristina Karamo - Former Michigan Republican Party Chairwoman, noted conspiracy theorist and election denier

== Notable faculty ==
- Clinton E. Arnold – Talbot Dean, former president of the Evangelical Theological Society.
- William Lane Craig – Research Professor of Philosophy, author, and Christian apologist.
- J. P. Moreland – Distinguished Professor of Philosophy, author, and lecturer.
- Scott B. Rae – Dean of Faculty, Professor of Christian Ethics, former president of Evangelical Theological Society
- Robert L. Saucy – Distinguished Professor of Systematic Theology, author and former president of the Evangelical Theological Society.

== Talbot Complex Project ==
The Talbot Building Complex Project was an ambitious $55.4 million project that was to take place in two phases over the course of several years. Prior to completion of Phase One, existing Talbot facilities, which had been designed for 300 graduate students, were serving 1,000 students in massively overcrowded conditions. When completed, the buildings were designed to form a seminary "campus within a campus." However, after the completion of Phase One in 2011 plans for Phase Two were placed on indefinite hold over funding challenges and as of 2026, there are currently no official plans to build a second building.

Phase One added a new 30,617-square-foot (2,844.4 m^{2}) building adjacent to Feinberg Hall, named Talbot East. This $21.4 million project added 7 classrooms, 31 academic offices, and features a faculty meeting room, prayer chapel, two conference rooms, and a Ph.D. seminar room. On May 20, 2010, Biola officials held a ground breaking ceremony for Phase One and it was officially dedicated on October 14, 2011.

Phase Two would have been much larger than Talbot East and demolished 60 year old Myers Hall. It would haven been a state-of-the-art 57,798-square-foot (5,369.6 m^{2}) building, providing 17 classrooms, 53 academic offices, a theology reading room, a student lounge/cafe', and a recreation room. Rooftop gardens would have helped decrease the amount of energy required to heat and cool the building. Phase Two would have also remodeled the first floor of Feinberg Hall to accommodate the Institute for Spiritual Formation. Those plans were scrapped when a new remodel project was completed on Feinberg years later.

== See also ==
- Biola University
