= Charlotte Chapel =

Charlotte Chapel may be

- Charlotte Chapel (Edinburgh)
- Charlotte Chapel, London, which later became the Westminster Theatre.
