= Clyde Cook =

Clyde Cook may refer to:

- Clyde Cook (educator) (1935–2008), president of Biola University, 1982–2007
- Clyde Cook (actor) (1891–1984), Australian-born vaudevillian and actor
- Clyde Cook (cinematographer) (1890–1936), American cinematographer
