= Harry A. Ironside =

Canadian-American Bible teacher (1876-1951)

- Born: October 14, 1876; Toronto, Ontario
- Died: January 15, 1951 (aged 74); Cambridge, New Zealand
- Occupation: Bible teacher
- Spouses: Helen Schofield Ironside (m. 1898; died 1948) Ann Hightower Ironside (m. 1949)

Henry Allan "Harry" Ironside (October 14, 1876 – January 15, 1951) was a Canadian–American Bible teacher, preacher, theologian, pastor and author who pastored Moody Church in Chicago from 1929 to 1948.

== Biography ==
Ironside was born in Toronto, Ontario, to John and Sophia (Stafford) Ironside, who were both active in the Plymouth Brethren. At birth, Harry was thought to be dead, so the attending nurses focused their attention on Sophia, who was dangerously ill. Only when a pulse was detected in Harry, 40 minutes later, was an attempt made to resuscitate the infant. When Harry was two years old, his father, John, died of typhoid at the age of 26. From a very early age, Ironside showed a strong interest in evangelical Christianity, and was active in the Salvation Army as a teenager before later joining the "Grant" section of the Plymouth Brethren.

The family then moved to Los Angeles, California, on December 12, 1886, and as they found no Sunday school there to attend, young Harry started his own at age 11. Gathering old burlap bags, Harry and his childhood friends sewed them together, producing a burlap tent that could accommodate up to 100 people. Unable to find an adult teacher, Ironside himself did the teaching, with attendance averaging 60 children—and a few adults—each week.

In 1888, well-known evangelist Dwight L. Moody preached at a campaign in Los Angeles, with meetings held at Hazard's Pavilion (later known as "Temple Pavilion"), which could seat up to 8,000. This was an inspiration to Ironside, who hoped to also be able to preach to such crowds one day. In 1889, after a visit from evangelist Donald Munro, Ironside became convinced that he was not "born again", and so gave up preaching at his Sunday school, spending the next six months wrestling with this spiritual problem. After an evening of prayer, in February 1890, Ironside, at age 13, received Christ. As he is quoted as saying years later, "I rested on the Word of God and confessed Christ as my Savior." Ironside then returned to preaching, winning his first convert. Though he was taunted at school, he was undeterred from his mission to win souls. Later that year, his mother remarried, to William D. Watson. Ironside graduated from the eighth grade, began working as a part-time cobbler, and decided he had enough education (he never attended school again, a decision he later regretted).

During the daytime, young Ironside worked full-time at a photography studio, and at night he preached at Salvation Army meetings, becoming known as the "boy preacher". At age 16, he left the photography business and became a preacher full-time with the Salvation Army. Commissioned a Lieutenant in the Salvation Army, Ironside was soon preaching over 400 sermons a year around Southern California. At 18, the grueling schedule had taken its toll on his health, and Ironside resigned his commission, entering the Beulah Rest Home to recuperate.

In 1896, at 20, he moved to San Francisco, becoming associated again with the Plymouth Brethren. While there, he began helping at British evangelist Henry Varley's meetings and there met pianist Helen Schofield, daughter of a Presbyterian pastor in Oakland, California. The two soon married. In 1898, Ironside's mother died, and less than a year later, Harry and Helen's first son, Edmund Henry, was born. In 1900, the family moved across the bay to Oakland, where Harry resumed a nightly preaching schedule. They resided there until 1929.

In 1903, Ironside accepted his first East Coast preaching invitation, but on returning, the family had only enough funds to make it as far as Salt Lake City, Utah, where he spent the next ten days doing street preaching. Just as the last of their money for a hotel ran out, they received an anonymous envelope with $15, enough to return to Oakland. In 1905, a second son, John Schofield Ironside, was born.

During this time, Ironside also began his career as a writer, publishing several Bible commentary pamphlets. In 1914, he rented a storefront and established the Western Book and Tract Company, which operated successfully until the Depression in the late 1920s. From 1916 to 1929, Ironside preached almost 7,000 sermons to over 1.25 million listeners. In 1918, he was associated with evangelist George McPherson; and in 1924, Ironside began preaching under the direction of the Moody Bible Institute. In 1926, he was invited to a full-time faculty position at the Dallas Theological Seminary, an offer he turned down, although he was frequently a visiting lecturer there from 1925 to 1943.

After preaching a series of sermons at the Moody Church in Chicago, Ironside was invited in 1929 to serve a trial year as pastor. The following year he became the official pastor, and he served there until 1948. He preached at Moody Church almost every Sunday, with the 4,000-seat auditorium filled to capacity. He continued to preach in other US cities as well; and in 1932, he began traveling abroad. In 1938, Ironside toured England, Scotland and Ireland, preaching 142 times, to crowds of upwards of 2,000. In 1942, he also became president of the missionary organization Africa Inland Mission. In 1935, Ironside preached the funeral of Billy Sunday at Moody Church.

In 1930, Wheaton College presented Ironside with an honorary Doctorate of Letters degree, and in 1942 Bob Jones University awarded him an honorary Doctor of Divinity degree.

A few months after he and his wife Helen celebrated their golden wedding anniversary, Helen died on May 1, 1948. Ironside resigned as pastor of Moody Church on May 30 and retired to Winona Lake, Indiana. On October 9, 1949, he married Annie Turner Hightower, of Thomaston, Georgia. He suffered from failing vision, and after surgery to restore it, he set out on November 2, 1950, for a preaching tour of New Zealand, once more among Brethren assemblies, but he died in Cambridge, New Zealand, on January 15, 1951, and was buried in Purewa Cemetery, Auckland.

Never one to ask money for himself, Ironside was skilled at raising money for other evangelical causes and was often asked to take the offering at Bible conferences. He joked that his tombstone would read, "And the beggar died also."

Bob Jones Jr. wrote that although Ironside was considered a dignified man, when one got to know him, "He had a terrific sense of humor. Nothing was more fun than to have a good meal in a home somewhere when Dr. Ironside was present. After he was full—he could eat a lot, and he ate faster than any man I ever saw, and his plate would be empty before everyone else got served—he would sit back, push his chair back from the table, and begin to tell funny stories and personal experiences." In 2011, Bob Jones University renamed a residence hall that formerly honored Bibb Graves after Ironside.

== Beliefs ==
=== Soteriology ===
Ironside wrote that the gospel is simply by faith, rejecting the claims that baptism, turning from sins or submission to Jesus form the gospel. He claimed that assurance of salvation is possible, and it does not come from self interspection but by looking at the work of Christ. He wrote that repentance in the New Testament refers to a simple change of mind, being a synonym for belief. He rejected the claim that repentance should be viewed as turning from sin.

Ironside believed that there is a large difference between the judgement seat of Christ and the great white throne judgement. According to Ironside, Christians will be judged for their eternal reward at the judgement seat of Christ, but their good works will not affect their eternal salvation.

=== Triadology ===
Ironside was a trinitarian, believing that the doctrine of the trinity is found in both the Old and New Testaments. Ironside in his commentary on Proverbs 8:22-36 identified the personification of wisdom in the passage as speaking of the second person of the trinity, believing that this passage speaks of the eternal generation of the Son.

=== Dispensationalism ===
Harry Ironside was a dispensationalist; however, he was very critical of ultradispensationalism as taught by E. W. Bullinger. In his book Wrongly Dividing the Word of Truth, he critiqued ultradispensationalist beliefs such as that the church in the book of Acts is different from the body of Christ, that the church did not start until Paul's imprisonment in Rome and that Baptism and the Lord's Supper no longer apply to Christians.

Ironside believed that the church is parenthetical, which was something not revealed in the Old Testament, and at some point God will rapture the church before the great tribulation, during which he will again focus on the nation of Israel.

== Theological influence ==
Along with others such as Cyrus Scofield, he was influential in popularizing dispensationalism among Protestants in North America. Despite his lack of formal education, his mental capacity, photographic memory and zeal for his beliefs caused him to be called "the Archbishop of Fundamentalism".

Ironside was one of the most prolific Christian writers of the 20th century and published more than 100 books, booklets and pamphlets, a number of which are still in print. One editorial reviewer wrote of a 2005 re-publication, "Ironside's commentaries are a standard and have stood the test of time." Ironside also wrote a number of hymns, including "Overshadowed".

== Works ==
=== Commentaries ===
In canonical order

- Lectures on the Levitical Offerings (1929)
- Addresses on the Book of Joshua (1950)
- Notes on the Books of Ezra (1920)
- Notes on the Books of Nehemiah (1913)
- Notes on the Books of Esther (1905)
- Notes on the Books of Ezra, Nehemiah and Esther (Compilation 1951)
- Studies on Book One of the Psalms (1st edition 1952. Posthumous)
- Notes on the Book of Proverbs (1908)
- Addresses on the Song of Solomon (1933)
- Expository Notes on the Prophet Isaiah (1949)
- Notes on the Prophecy and Lamentations of Jeremiah (1906)
- Expository Notes on Ezekiel the Prophet (1949)
- Lectures on Daniel the Prophet (1st, 1911; 2nd, 1920)
- Notes on the Minor Prophets (1909)
- Expository Notes on the Gospel of Matthew (1948)
- Expository Notes on the Gospel of Mark (1948)
- Addresses on the Gospel of Luke (1947)
- Addresses on the Gospel of John (1942)
- Lectures on the Book of Acts (1943)
- Lectures on the Epistle to the Romans (1926)
- Addresses on the First Epistle to the Corinthians (1938)
- Addresses on the Second Epistle to the Corinthians (1939)
- Expository Messages on the Epistle to the Galatians (1942)
- In the Heavenlies: Practical Expository Addresses on the Epistle to the Ephesians (1937)
- Notes on the Epistle to the Philippians (1922)
- Lectures on the Epistle to the Colossians (1928)
- Addresses on the First and Second Epistles of Thessalonians (1947)
- Timothy, Titus and Philemon (1947)
- Studies in the Epistle to the Hebrews and the Epistle to Titus (1932)
- Expository Notes on the Epistles of James and Peter (1947)
- Addresses on the Epistles of John and an Exposition of the Epistle of Jude (1949)
- Lectures on the Book of Revelation (1919)

=== Books and booklets ===
In order by date of first publication

- Baptism: What Saith the Scriptures (1901, 2nd edition 1915)
- The Mysteries of God (1906)
- Sailing with Paul (1913: Loizeaux Bros, NY)
- The Four Hundred Silent Years (1914: Loizeaux Bros)
- The Midnight Cry (1914: Loizeaux Bros; 4th edition 1928)
- Letters to a Roman Catholic (1914: Loizeaux Bros)
- Good News from a Far Country: Ten Gospel Sermons (1934: Eerdmans) (Contributed chapter 5, titled "The Blood of His Cross")
- Eternal Security of the Believer (1934: Loizeaux Bros)
- Things Seen and Heard in Bible Lands (1936: Loizeaux Bros)
- Except Ye Repent (1937: American Tract Society)
- The Crowning Day (1938)
- Help for the Needy Soul (1938)
- Wrongly Dividing the Word of Truth: Ultra-Dispensationalism Examined In The Light Of Holy Scripture (1938: 3rd edition, Loizeaux Bros) (A critique of the teachings of E. W. Bullinger and hyperdispensationalism)
- Random Reminiscences from Fifty Years of Ministry (1939)
- Changed by Beholding: and other sermons (1940)
- The Way of Peace (1940)
- A Historical Sketch of the Brethren Movement (1941: Loizeaux Bros)
- Not Wrath but Rapture (1941: Loizeaux Bros)
- The Continual Burnt Offering (1941: Jubilee Edition, Loizeaux Bros)
- The Great Parenthesis (1943: Zondervan, Grand Rapids, MI; 2014, 2016, 2017)
- Holiness: The False and the True (1947: Loizeaux Bros)

=== Pamphlets and tracts ===
- "The Mormon Mistake" (1896)
- "The Stone that Will Fall from Heaven" (nd)

== See also ==
- Christian perfection
- Premillennialism
- Christian fundamentalism
- R. A. Torrey
- A. C. Dixon
- Alan Redpath
- Warren Wiersbe
- G. Campbell Morgan
- Gipsy Smith
