= Clyde Cook (educator) =

American academic administrator (1935–2008)

- Born: June 1, 1935; Hong Kong
- Died: April 11, 2008 (aged 72); Fullerton, California, U.S.
- Education: B.A., M.Div., Th.M. (Biola University and Talbot School of Theology); Doctor of Missiology, Fuller Theological Seminary (1974)
- Occupation: University president · Educator · Missionary
- Years active: 1957–2008
- Organizations: Biola University; Overseas Crusades (O.C. International); Christian College Consortium; Council for Christian Colleges & Universities
- Known for: Longtime president of Biola University (1982–2007); significant expansion of Biola’s academic programs and global outreach; mission leadership
- Spouse: Anna Belle Lund (m. 1957–2008)
- Children: Two

Clyde Cook (June 1, 1935 – April 11, 2008) served as president of Biola University in La Mirada, California, from 1982 to 2007.

== Early life and education ==
Cook was born to Capt. Archibald Cook, a former sea captain, and Frances "Fanny" Emerick Wight Cook on June 1, 1935, in Hong Kong, the fourth of six children, and a third generation missionary. During World War II, his family was imprisoned in three different concentration camps. In 1942 he was reunited with his poverty stricken family in South Africa.

By 1947, the Cooks had moved to the United States, and settled in Laguna Beach, California. At Laguna Beach High School Cook's talent in basketball resulted in his winning the California Interscholastic Federation Division AA-A 1953 basketball player of the year award. He was awarded athletics scholarships to 13 different major universities but instead chose to go to Biola College. He earned a Bachelor's degree in Bible from Biola in 1957, and later received both a Master of Divinity degree and a Master of Theology degree from Talbot School of Theology. He earned his Doctor of Missiology (D.Miss.) in 1974 from Fuller Theological Seminary.

== Career ==
Cook spent several years working at Biola as both a coach and the school's athletic director.

From 1963 to 1967, Cook and his wife Anna Belle served as missionaries in Cebu, Philippines with Overseas Crusades, now OC International (or One Challenge), (founded by Dick Hillis). During this time, Cook traveled to 72 different countries doing various missions-related activities and representing the college.

Returning to Biola in 1967 as an assistant professor of missions, Cook was then appointed director of intercultural studies and missions and helped to develop Biola's program in cross-cultural education. Called to the presidency of O.C. Ministries (formerly Overseas Crusades) in 1978, he guided the mission organization to an increased level of financial stability and multiplied foreign field involvement.

Cook served on the Biola board of trustees from 1980 to 1982 when he was invited by a unanimous vote of the board to assume the seventh presidency of Biola University on June 1, 1982, succeeding outgoing president J. Richard Chase.

Cook served for seven years on the board of directors of the Christian College Coalition, and one year as its chair. He also served for six years on the board of directors of the National Association of Independent Colleges and Universities, and served as the president of that organization for two years. He served on the Western Association of Schools and Colleges accreditation task force. He served several years as a member of the steering committee for the Fellowship of Evangelical Seminary Presidents, and for six years on the executive committee of the Association of Independent Colleges and Universities of California.

== Retirement ==
Cook announced his retirement in 2006, a year ahead of time in order to give the university's board of trustees enough time to find a replacement. He stated that he wanted to allow a new president to usher in Biola's centennial celebrations. In May 2006, Cook was honored for his work at Biola at the Crystal Cathedral in Orange County, and his interview by Rev. Robert H. Schuller was viewed by an estimated 20 million viewers worldwide on the Hour of Power.

On June 30, 2007, Cook retired, just prior to the official start of Biola's centennial celebration. He was one of California's longest serving university presidents. Cook was noted for his strong defense of Biblical doctrine, including the key doctrine of Biblical inerrancy. Under Cook's leadership, Biola grew tremendously from a small Bible college to one of the largest evangelical universities in the nation, with nearly 6,000 total students.

After an extensive search, Dr. Barry Corey was selected to become the eighth president of Biola University on May 11, 2007. Dr. Corey was formerly Vice President/Chief Academic Officer and Academic Dean at Gordon-Conwell Theological Seminary. He succeeded Clyde Cook as president on July 1, 2007. Cook served as the university's President through June 2007 and as President Emeritus until his death.

== Death and legacy ==
Cook died on April 11, 2008, at the age of 72. He had recently returned to his home in Fullerton, California, from a speaking engagement in Houston, Texas, when he suffered a massive heart attack. He had a history of heart problems and nearly died from an earlier heart attack at age 49. After a private funeral, more than 2,000 people attended a memorial service at First Evangelical Free Church of Fullerton, where Cook was a long-time member, on April 19. Noted evangelical author and Cook friend, Dr. Charles Swindoll, presented the message. On April 21, Biola held Cook's final memorial service, where over 3,000 students and faculty attended.

The Cook School of Intercultural Studies, now part of Talbot School of Theology, was named after him and his wife.
