= J. Richard Chase =

American college president (1930–2010)

- Born: October 7, 1930; Oxnard, California, U.S.
- Died: August 20, 2010 (aged 79); Carol Stream, Illinois, U.S.
- Education: Biola University (Bachelor of Theology, 1951); Pepperdine University (B.A., M.A. in Speech); Cornell University (Ph.D. in Speech, 1961)
- Occupation: Educator · College president · Academic administrator
- Years active: c. 1961–1993
- Organizations: Biola University; Wheaton College
- Known for: Sixth president of Biola University (1970–1982) and Wheaton College (1982–1993)
- Spouse: Mary Sutherland Chase (m. 1950–2010)
- Children: Two

J. Richard Chase (1930–2010) was the sixth president of Biola University in California from 1970 to 1982 and the sixth president of Wheaton College in Illinois from 1982 to 1993.

== Early life and education ==
J. Richard Chase grew up on a dairy farm in Oxnard, California and attended the Bible Institute of Los Angeles (later Biola University). Biola president Samuel Sutherland mentored Chase, and Chase married Sutherland's daughter in 1950. He graduated from Biola in 1951 with a degree in theology, and then attended Pepperdine University on a basketball scholarship, where he received a bachelor's and master's degree. Chase graduated with a Ph.D. in speech from Cornell University in 1960.

== Career ==
In the early 1960s Chase taught at Biola in the speech department while leading a church in Hollywood. He was named vice president of academic affairs in 1965 and was appointed president of the university in 1970. After serving as president of Biola for twelve years, Chase was appointed as president of Wheaton College in 1982 where he served in this role for eleven years, seeking to attract students from around the world and maintain the university's academic standards and biblical values. He retired in 1993, succeeded by Duane Litfin. Chase's tenure at Wheaton was notable for his fundraising successes but also for a censorship controversy in 1990 where several students were suspended or expelled for publishing an off-color underground newspaper. After leaving Wheaton's presidency, Chase taught courses at Tyndale Seminary in the Netherlands from 1993 to 2003.

== Death ==
Chase died on August 20, 2010, in Carol Stream, Illinois, after a long battle with dementia and pneumonia.

== Personal life ==
Chase was married for 59 years to Mary (Sutherland) Chase, and had two children, Kenneth Chase and Jennifer Chase Barnard, and seven grandchildren. Chase was the great-great-nephew of American politician and jurist Salmon P. Chase.

Academic offices
Preceded by Samuel H. Sutherland	President of Biola University; 1970–1982	Succeeded by Clyde Cook

Academic offices
Preceded by Hudson Armerding	President of Wheaton College; 1982–1993	Succeeded by Duane Litfin
