= John Harper (pastor) =

Scottish Baptist pastor (1872–1912)

- Rev. John Harper
- Born: 29 May 1872; Houston, Renfrewshire, Scotland
- Died: 15 April 1912 (aged 39); North Atlantic Ocean

John Harper (29 May 1872 – 15 April 1912) was a Scottish Baptist pastor who died in the sinking of the RMS Titanic in the North Atlantic Ocean.

== Early life ==
Harper was born in the village of Houston, Renfrewshire, Scotland, in 1872. He personally embraced his parents' Christian faith at age 13 and began preaching at 17. He supported himself in early adulthood by doing manual labor in a mill until Baptist pastor E.A. Carter of Baptist Pioneer Mission in London heard of his preaching and placed him in ministry work in Govan, Scotland.

== Paisley Road Baptist Church ==
In 1897, he became the first pastor of Paisley Road Baptist Church in Glasgow, Scotland. Under his care, the church quickly grew from 25 members to over 500 and soon moved to a new location on Plantation Street. In 1923, it moved into its present building on Craigiehall Street and was renamed Harper Memorial Baptist Church in his honor.

== Titanic: final preaching and death ==
At the time of the Titanic disaster, Harper was 39, a widower with a six-year-old daughter, Annie Jessie (Nana), and pastor of Walworth Road Baptist Church in London. He was traveling with his daughter and his sister, Jessie W. Leitch, to Chicago to preach for three months at the Moody Church, where he had been guest evangelist for a three-month revival meeting the previous year. He was traveling there upon the Titanic as it hit an iceberg on the night of April 14, 1912. His daughter and niece were put on a lifeboat and survived, but Harper stayed behind and jumped into the water as the ship began to sink. Some survivors recounted that Harper preached the Gospel to the end (especially Acts 16:31), first aboard the sinking ship and then afterward to those in the freezing water before dying in it himself. George Henry Cavell testified at a survivors meeting that he was Harper's final convert.

However, in a panel discussion livestream titled *On a Sea of Glass – Titanic 114 Anniversary Livestream* (2026), one of the panel stated that “we know there's no source for that story whatsoever” in reference to the claim that John Harper gave away his life jacket and led a convert to Christianity in the water following the sinking of the RMS Titanic.

During the same discussion, participants further commented that the account of Harper moving between survivors in the water and holding conversations would be implausible under the environmental conditions, and noted that the story has circulated widely despite lacking documentary evidence.

== Legacy ==
The story of John Harper aboard the Titanic is told in the book, The Titanic's Last Hero, published by Moody Adams in 1988. According to the book, it is based on testimonies published in Scotland in 1912.

A children's version of John Harper's last days on board the Titanic was published by Christian Focus Publications in March 2011 titled 'Titanic – Ship of Dreams – John Harper' written by Robert Plant.

As noted above, when Harper's church, Paisley Road West Church, Glasgow, moved into its new building, it was named Harper Memorial Church in his honour.^{[3]}

== See also ==
- RMS Titanic
- Passengers of the RMS Titanic
