= Neil T. Anderson =

American writer, speaker, and academic

Neil T. Anderson is an American writer on Christianity including Victory Over the Darkness, The Bondage Breaker, The Steps to Freedom in Christ and Daily in Christ. He is founder and president emeritus of Freedom in Christ Ministries. He was formerly chairman of the Practical Theology Department at Talbot School of Theology.

== Early life ==
Neil Anderson was born on a farm in Minnesota to Scandinavian parents. After high school he joined the Navy and received training as an electronics technician and also worked as a sea and rescue swimmer. After being discharged honorably from the Navy he entered engineering school. After graduation, he took up a job as an aerospace engineer. He became a Christian while attending a Lay Institute For Evangelism by Campus Crusade for Christ. Two years after deciding to follow Jesus, he resigned his position at Honeywell and enrolled at Talbot School of Theology, the graduate school of Biola University.
