= Derek Prime =

Scottish pastor (1931–2020)

The Reverend Derek Prime
- Born: 20 February 1931; London, England
- Died: 28 March 2020 (aged 89); Edinburgh, Scotland
- Education: Westminster City School; Emmanuel College, University of Cambridge (MA)
- Occupations: Pastor, author
- Spouse: Betty Martin (m. 1955; died 2007)
- Children: 4

Derek Prime (20 February 1931 – 28 March 2020) was a Scottish evangelical minister and author.

== Biography ==
Prime became a Christian at the age of 13, before completing his National Service with the Royal Scots Greys in Germany. He studied at Emmanuel College, Cambridge. After several years working as a teacher, he became the minister of Lansdowne Evangelical Free Church in West Norwood. In 1966, he was appointed president of the Fellowship of Independent Evangelical Churches and was influential in making the case for the fellowship's continued existence. In 1969, he became the minister of Charlotte Chapel in Edinburgh for 18 years, where he mentored Alistair Begg as his assistant.

Prime retired from the pastorate in 1987, and in later years, wrote several books on Christianity and various commentaries on the Bible.

== Selected bibliography ==
- Prime, Derek (2003), Let's Study 2 Corinthians, Banner of Truth, ISBN 978-0-85151-779-7.
- Prime, Derek; Begg, Alistair (2004), On Being a Pastor: Understanding Our Calling and Work, Moody Publishers, ISBN 978-0-80243-122-6.
- Prime, Derek (2014), Bible Answers: Questions About the Christian Faith & Life, Christian Focus, ISBN 978-1-85792-934-8.
- ——— (2017), A Good Old Age, 10Publishing, ISBN 978-1-91127-282-3.
