= Charlotte Chapel (Edinburgh) =

Baptist church in Edinburgh, Scotland

Coordinates: 55°57′5″N 3°12′18″W

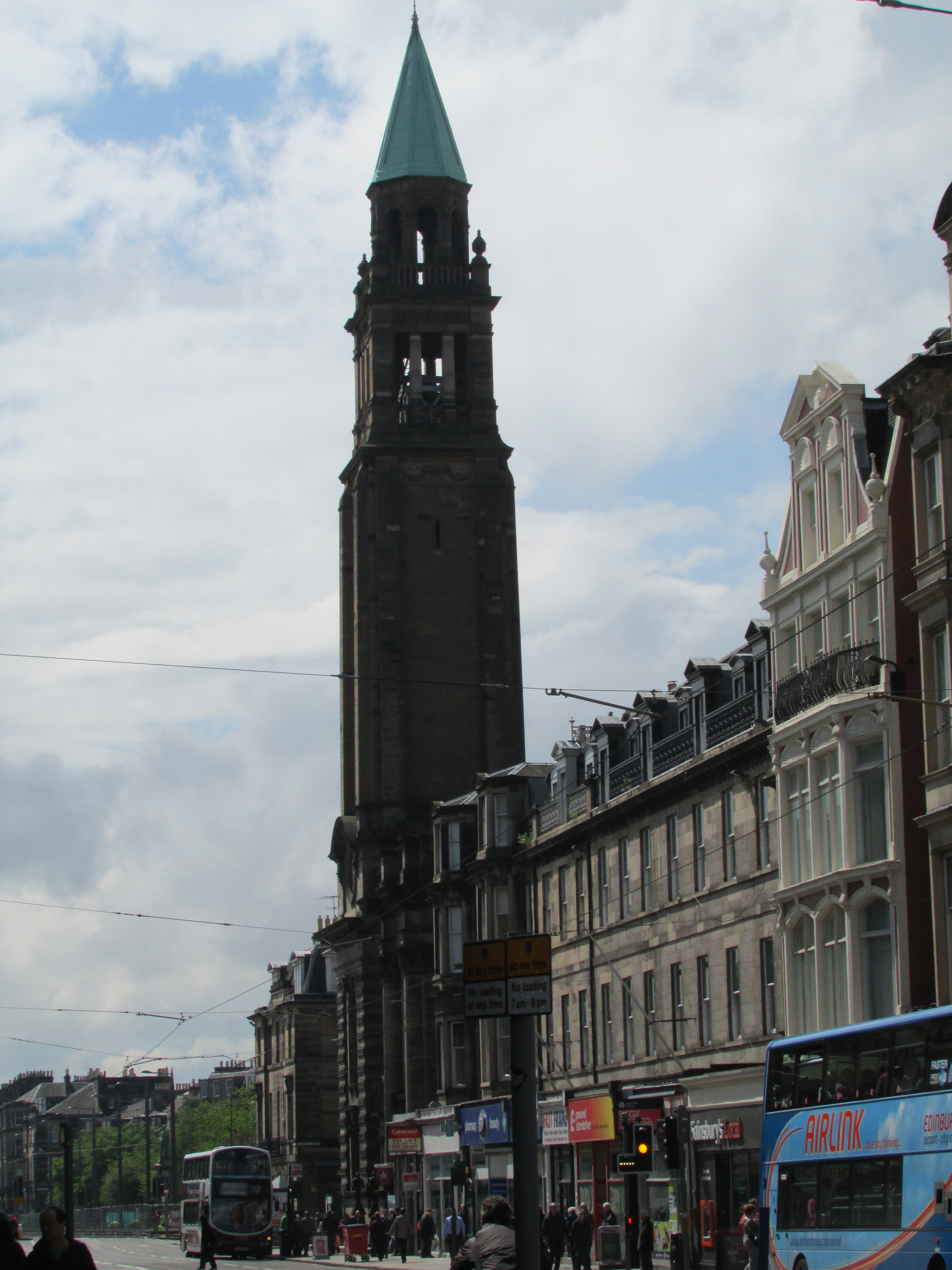
The building that was once known as St George's West where the church family of Charlotte Chapel now meet

Charlotte Chapel (officially Charlotte Baptist Chapel) is an evangelical Baptist church located in Shandwick Place, Edinburgh, Scotland. It is affiliated with the Fellowship of Independent Evangelical Churches, and the Pillar Network.

== History ==
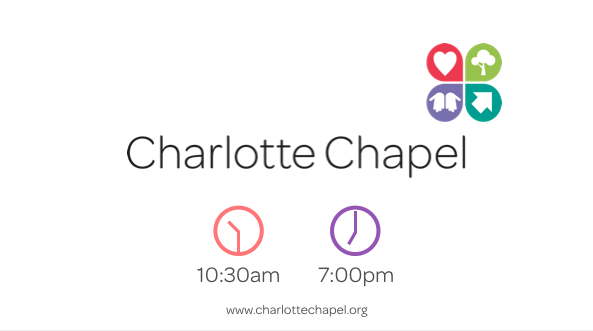
The chapel's logo

=== Early history ===
The congregation was established in January 1808, when Christopher Anderson, a young Edinburgh businessman, began evangelical work in the Pleasance area of the city. By 1816, his Pleasance church was too small, and he purchased Charlotte Chapel. The chapel was recently vacated by a Qualified congregation which had joined the Scottish Episcopal Church and then moved to St John's Church, on Princes Street. The original two-storey building seated 750 attendants. Anderson was pastor until 1851, and membership peaked at 232 in 1873, although many more attended services.

Membership began to fall due mainly to emigration, and by 1901, the church had no minister and only a small congregation. Joseph Kemp, of Hawick, who was appointed pastor, began a revival, holding open-air meetings in Princes Street. Membership rose once more, and in 1907 plans for a new building were prepared. The Rose Street church building was built at a cost of £7,250 and opened in 1912 with seating for exactly 1000 attendants.

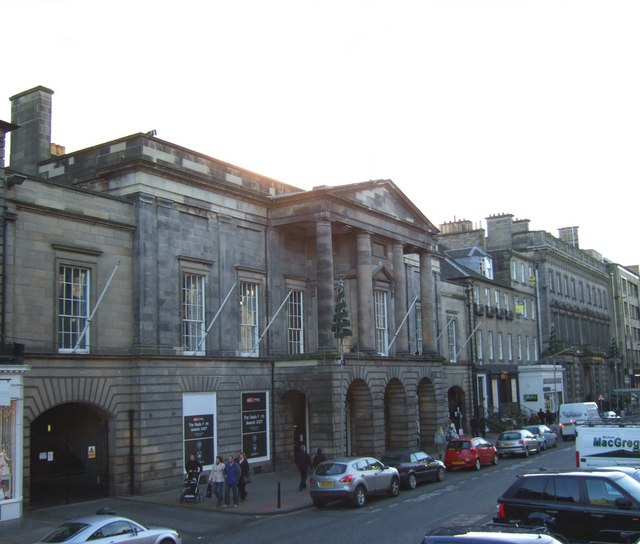
Assembly Rooms (Edinburgh) site of the chapel's Bicentenary Luncheon.

=== Subsequent pastoral leadership ===
- W. Graham Scroggie (1916–1933).
- J. Sidlow Baxter (1935–1953).
- Gerald Griffiths (1954–1962).
- Alan Redpath (1964–1968).
- Derek Prime (1969–1987).
- Peter Grainger (1992–2009).
- Paul Rees (2009–date).

=== Recent history ===
In 2008, during the latter part of pastor Peter Grainger's tenure, the church held its 200th anniversary celebrations over the course of an extended weekend in October. These celebrations included a large cèilidh at an area school, a formal luncheon at the Assembly Rooms on George Street, and a concert by modern hymn writers Keith & Kristyn Getty.

During the bicentennial, the church also saw many former members return and guest ministers visit, such as James Moser, Derek Prime, and American-based radio pastor Alistair Begg. Begg, a native of Scotland, was formerly "Pastor's Assistant" to Prime at Charlotte Chapel, beginning in September 1975. He returned to lead the 2008 celebrations, preaching at both the Sunday morning and evening services at the church's former Rose Street location. In addition, a scholarly book exploring the church's history and concluding with the 200th anniversary was later written by Ian L. S. Balfour entitled Revival in Rose Street: Charlotte Baptist Chapel, Edinburgh.

== Building ==
In 2013, the St George's West Church (Church of Scotland) closed the building. In May 2016, Charlotte Chapel moved to the redundant St. George's West Church at 58 Shandwick Place.
