= Moody Church =

Evangelical Christian church in Chicago, Illinois, US

The Moody Church
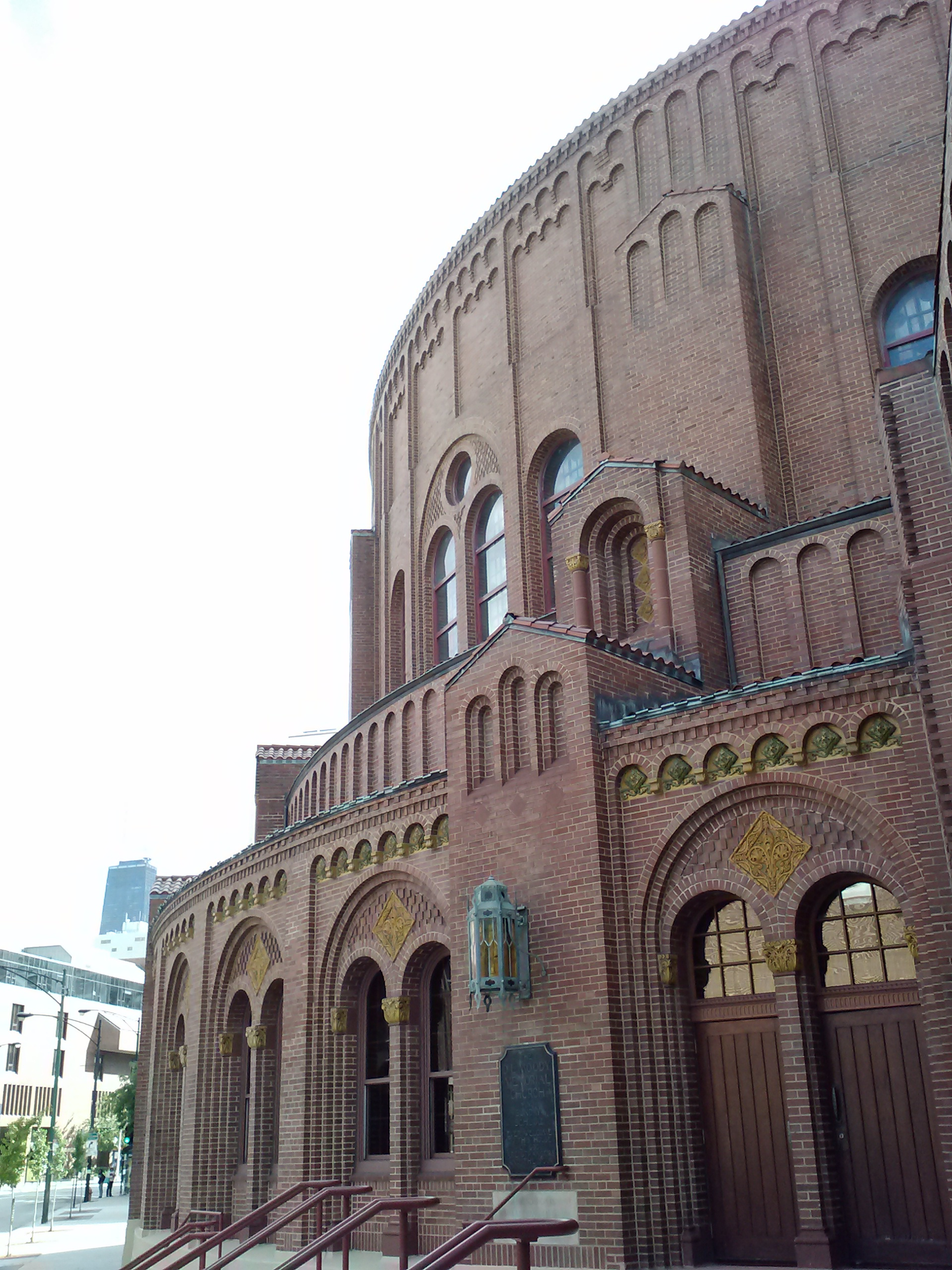
- Moody Church
- The Moody Church
- 41.911654°N 87.632491°W
- Location: Chicago. Illinois
- Country: United States
- Denomination: Nondenominational Christianity
- Website: www.moodychurch.org

History
- Former name(s): Illinois Street Church, Chicago Avenue Church
- Founded: December 30, 1864
- Founder: Dwight L. Moody

Architecture
- Completed: November 8, 1925

The Moody Church (often referred to as Moody Memorial Church, after a sign hung on the North Avenue side of the building) is a historic evangelical Christian (Nondenominational Christianity) church in the Lincoln Park neighborhood of Chicago, Illinois.

== Building ==
The Moody Church building is located at the corners of North Avenue, Clark Street, and LaSalle Street. It was designed by architects Fugard and Knapp. Construction was begun in 1924 and completed 1 year later, with dedication of the building on November 8, 1925. Covering an area of 140 feet by 225 feet, the church melds features of both Romanesque and Byzantine architecture, and is one of the largest Romanesque churches in the US. Visually, it was intended to bridge the gap between the traditional Catholic Church cathedral and the typical Protestant church buildings of the late 19th century and early 20th century. The building was originally intended to be 20 feet longer, but due to widening of LaSalle Street, the layout had to be altered; this is believed by some to be the reason for the unusually steep choir loft. From floor to the false acoustic ceiling is 68 feet, and the structural ceiling is 10 to 15 feet above that.

The resulting building remains the largest non-pillared auditorium in the Chicago area, and has permanent seating for 3,740 people, 2,270 on the main floor and 1,470 in the balcony. The curved balcony was one of the earliest examples of cantilevered construction, and its curvature – as well as the rest of the layout of the auditorium – was designed so that all lines focus on the pulpit. Designed in an era before modern sound systems, the building has almost-perfect acoustics, and it is reported that the only element detracting from this aspect is the floor carpet.

Although a modern environmental system has been installed, when the church was originally built, summer cooling was provided by means of a large pit in an alley in back of the building, where large loads of ice would be dumped. Air was then blown over the ice and out of mushroom-shaped vents under the auditorium seats. The system could recirculate the church's air in six minutes.

Above the balcony, around the perimeter of the building, are 36 large stained glass windows, no two of which are alike. All were donated as memorials.

When originally built, the church did not have an organ, but later a 4-manual Reuter organ with 4,400 pipes in 54 ranks was added. The pipes visible in the sanctuary are merely decorative, the actual instruments being hidden behind a black screen.

In January, 1986, a fire in the front of the church caused $500,000 damage to the pulpit, choir loft, and organ. During the rebuilding, a modern audio-visual system was installed. Amongst the newest additions to the sanctuary are a pair of motion-picture screens; these ascending screens are currently the tallest in the US.

== History ==
The church originally was the result of the sustainable work of famed evangelist Dwight L. Moody in the mid-to-late-19th century. Moody concentrated his efforts on promoting his Sunday school, and by 1860, over 1,000 children and their parents attended each week. It had become the largest and most well-known religious outreach of its kind, with the result that President Abraham Lincoln visited the meeting one Sunday. Needing a permanent home, Moody's ministry built a 1,500-seat church at the corner of Illinois and Wells Streets, called the Illinois Street Church, which was formally dedicated December 30, 1864.

That building was completely destroyed on Sunday, October 8, 1871, when the Great Chicago Fire swept the area. That same year, a temporary structure is built, the North Side Tabernacle. A new building which could hold up to 10,000 people was dedicated in 1876 and the church was renamed Chicago Avenue Church in June, 1876.

Dwight Moody died after an illness in 1899, and in 1908, the church was formally renamed The Moody Church in his honor. A.C. Dixon took over as pastor in 1906 and he stayed until 1911. In 1912, John Harper of Scotland was traveling to Chicago to speak at the church, but tragedy overtook him. Returning from Scotland with his daughter and niece, Harper booked passage on the White Star Line’s new ocean liner Titanic. Although his daughter and niece were rescued, Harper was killed in the sinking. (Contrary to popular belief, Harper was never called to join the pastoral staff at the church.)

In 1925, the congregation moved to the Church's current location. In 1930, well-known evangelist Harry A. Ironside became the pastor, serving until his wife's death in 1948. In 1953, popular British evangelist Alan Redpath was appointed pastor, and served until 1962. From 1966 to 1971, George Sweeting served as pastor, before leaving to become the President of Moody Bible Institute, with his place being taken by Warren W. Wiersbe. On January 20, 1980, Erwin Lutzer was installed as the 16th senior pastor of The Moody Church. He resigned on May 22, 2016, and the 17th Pastor, Philip Miller was appointed in 2020.

In 2007, construction was completed on a three-story Christian Life Center addition to the original 1925 building, intended to provide sufficient Sunday School classroom space and accommodate new and growing ministries.

== Senior pastors ==
During its history, 17 men have served as senior pastor of The Moody Church. Dwight L. Moody was the founder, but never served as pastor.

1. J.H. Harwood (1866–1869)
2. Rev. William J. Erdman, D.D. (1876–1878)
3. Charles M. Morton (1878–1879)
4. George C. Needham (1879–1881)
5. Charles F. Goss (1885–1890)
6. Charles A. Blanchard (1891–1893)
7. Dr. Reuben A. Torrey (1894–1906)
8. A.C. Dixon, D.D. (1906–1911)
9. Paul Rader (1915–1921)
10. Rev. Peter Wiley Philpott, D.D. (1922–1929)
11. Dr. Harry A. Ironside (1930–1948)
12. S. Franklin Logsdon (1951–1952)
13. Alan Redpath (1953–1962)
14. George Sweeting (1966–1971)
15. Warren W. Wiersbe (1971–1978)
16. Dr. Erwin W. Lutzer (1980–2016)
17. Philip Miller (2020–Present)
