= Erwin Lutzer =

Canadian-American pastor and author

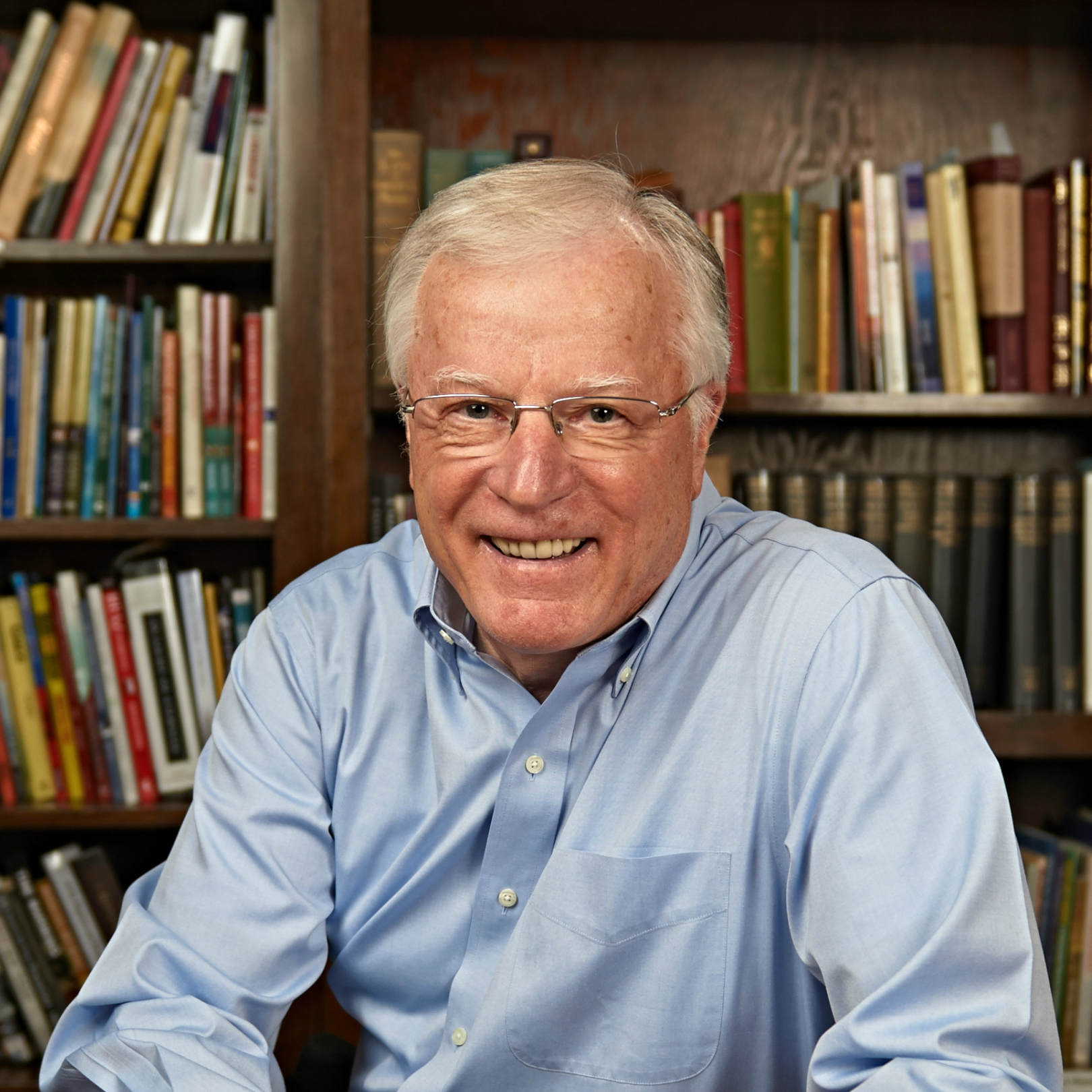
- Lutzer in 2019
- Born: October 3, 1941 (age 84); Regina, Saskatchewan, Canada
- Occupations: Pastor, author, teacher on Running to Win radio program
- Spouse: Rebecca Lutzer
- Website: erwinlutzer.com

Erwin W. Lutzer (born October 3, 1941) is a Canadian-born evangelical Christian speaker, radio broadcaster, and author. He is the pastor emeritus of The Moody Church in Chicago, Illinois (1980–2016).

== Career ==
Born in Saskatchewan, Canada, Lutzer became a born-again Christian at age 14. In 1962, he graduated from Winnipeg Bible Institute (now Providence University College and Theological Seminary) with a Bachelor's Degree in Biblical Education. He taught at Briercrest Bible Institute in Caronport, Saskatchewan, in the late 1960s – early 1970s. He served as senior pastor of Edgewater Baptist Church, Chicago, from 1971 to 1977. During that time he completed an M.A. in Philosophy from Loyola University Chicago. Previously he had earned the Master of Theology from Dallas Theological Seminary in 1967. He then entered the PhD program at Loyola to pursue a doctorate in philosophy; however, he did not complete his dissertation. In subsequent years, Lutzer has received two honorary doctorates, an LL.D. from Simon Greenleaf School of Law and a Doctor of Divinity from Western Conservative Baptist Seminary.

=== The Moody Church ===
In January 1980, Lutzer became the 16th senior pastor of The Moody Church in Chicago's Lincoln Park neighborhood. The church and its ministries grew significantly under his leadership, leading to the construction of a new Christian Life Center to complement the existing 75-year-old building. On January 4, 2016, at a Sunday sermon, Lutzer announced that he would be retiring from his senior pastor position at The Moody Church. He said he would retain the position until a new senior pastor was chosen, and afterward would consider himself to be the church's "Pastor Emeritus", planning to "assume a wider role" by continuing his radio show "Running to Win" as well as "speaking at media rallies, conducting seminars, and writing books" in the future. On the Sunday morning of May 22, 2016, Lutzer preached his last sermon as senior pastor of The Moody Church and officially stepped down from the position.

== Media ==
=== Radio and television ===
Pastor Lutzer is the featured speaker on two radio broadcasts produced by Moody Church Media: "Songs in the Night," (1980–Present) and "Running to Win" (1998–Present). From 1980 to 2024, he was also the featured speaker on the "Moody Church Hour," a weekly broadcast of worship and teaching.

On February 18, 2024, he transferred hosting “Moody Church Hour” to the 17th Senior pastor of The Moody Church, Philip Miller. These broadcasts are heard on radio stations across the U.S., including Moody Radio, Bott Radio Network, the Bible Broadcasting Network, and more as well as streaming worldwide on the internet. "Running To Win" also broadcasts internationally in over 50 countries and 7 languages, through partnerships like Trans World Radio.

On November 10, 2018, his television production of A Call for Freedom, tracing the Protestant Reformation from the time of Martin Luther and shot on location in Germany, won three regional Emmy Awards.

Lutzer continues to speak internationally at churches, conferences, and retreats, such as the Word of Life Conference Center in Hudson, Florida and the Training Center at the Cove with the Billy Graham Evangelistic Association.

On February 20, 2026, Lutzer was presented with the Hall of Fame award at the National Religious Broadcasters (NRB) convention in Nashville, TN.

== Legal issues ==
In December 2010, the Illinois Appellate Court for the Second District upheld a jury verdict finding Lutzer liable in the amount of $276,306 for False Light Invasion of Privacy in a civil case brought against Lutzer while acting in the capacity of Senior Pastor of the Moody Church by a former colleague and associate pastor. Lutzer had sent a letter to another church, informing its elders that their pastor was not adhering to the biblical criteria for pastors and elders.

=== Author ===
Lutzer has authored more than 70 books, including Hitler’s Cross, which won a Gold Medallion award from the Evangelical Christian Publishers Association, and the bestselling We Will Not Be Silenced: Responding Courageously to Our Culture's Assault on Christianity and One Minute After You Die: A Preview of Your Final Destination.

Lutzer's book critiquing Dan Brown’s best-selling novel The Da Vinci Code, entitled The Da Vinci Deception, was featured on national broadcasts in both secular and Christian markets.

== Personal life ==
Lutzer and his wife, Rebecca, make their home in the Chicago area as of 2021. They have three married daughters and eight grandchildren.

== Works ==
- One Minute After You Die: A Preview of Your Final Destination, ISBN 0-8024-6322-3
- The Da Vinci Deception, ISBN 0-8423-8430-8
- Jesus, Lover of a Woman’s Soul (with Rebecca Lutzer), ISBN 0-8423-8426-X
- Christ Among Other Gods: A Defense of Christ in an Age of Tolerance, ISBN 0-8024-1649-7
- How to Say No to a Stubborn Habit, ISBN 1-56476-331-5
- Hitler’s Cross: The Revealing Story of How the Cross of Christ Was Used as a Symbol of the Nazi Agenda (with Ravi Zacharias), ISBN 0-8024-3583-1
- The Doctrines That Divide: A Fresh Look at the Historic Doctrines That Separate Christians, ISBN 0-8254-3165-4
- Seven Reasons Why You Can Trust the Bible, ISBN 0-8024-8439-5
- The Vanishing Power Of Death: Conquering Your Greatest Fear, ISBN 0-8024-0945-8
- The Truth About Same-sex Marriage: 6 Things You Need To Know About What's Really At Stake, ISBN 1-59644-160-7
- Where Was God? : Answers to Tough Questions About God And Natural Disasters, ISBN 1-4143-1144-3
- Is God on America's Side?: The Surprising Answer and Why it Matters During This Election Season, ISBN 0-8024-8951-6
- Oprah, Miracles, and the New Earth: A Critique, ISBN 0-8024-8953-2
- The Serpent of Paradise, ISBN 0-8024-2720-0
- Living With Your Passions, ISBN 0-8820-7294-3
- Failure : The Back Door to Success, ISBN 0-8024-2516-X
- Pastor to Pastor: Tackling the Problems of Ministry, ISBN 0-8254-3164-6
- Life-Changing Bible Verses You Should Know (with Rebecca Lutzer), ISBN 0-7369-3952-0
- The Cross in the Shadow of the Crescent: An Informed Response to Islam's War with Christianity (with Steve Miller), ISBN 0-7369-5132-6
- When a Nation Forgets God: 7 Lessons We Must Learn from Nazi Germany, ISBN 0-8024-4656-6
- The King is Coming: Preparing to Meet Jesus, ISBN 0-8024-0317-4
- When You've Been Wronged: Moving From Bitterness to Forgiveness, ISBN 0-8024-8898-6
- No Place to Cry: Hurt and Healing of Sexual Abuse (with Dorie N. Van Stone), ISBN 0-8024-2278-0
- How You Can Be Sure That You Will Spend Eternity with God, ISBN 0-8024-2719-7
- Your Eternal Reward: Triumph and Tears at the Judgment Seat of Christ, ISBN 0-8024-4192-0
- Making the Best of a Bad Decision: How to Put Your Regrets behind You, Embrace Grace, and Move toward a Better Future, ISBN 1-4143-1143-5
- Where Do We Go From Here?: Hope and Direction in our Present Crisis, ISBN 0-8024-1013-8
- Putting Your Past Behind You: Finding Hope for Life's Deepest Hurts, ISBN 0-8024-5644-8
- Who Are You to Judge?: Learning to Distinguish Between Truths, Half-Truths and Lies, ISBN 0-8024-0906-7
- Seven Snares of the Enemy: Breaking Free From the Devil's Grip, ISBN 0-8024-1165-7
- Getting Closer to God: Lessons from the Life of Moses, ISBN 0-8254-4195-1
- Cries from the Cross: A Journey Into the Heart of Jesus, ISBN 0-8024-1111-8
- On the Path with God, ISBN 0-7369-3936-9
- Covering Your Life in Prayer: Discover a Life-Changing Conversation with God, ISBN 0-7369-5327-2
- After You've Blown It: Reconnecting with God and Others, ISBN 1-5905-2334-2
- Managing Your Emotions, ISBN 0-9156-8481-0
- Conquering the Fear of Failure: Lessons from the Life of Joshua, ISBN 0-8254-3905-1
- 10 Lies About God: And the Truths That Shatter Deception, ISBN 0-8254-2945-5
- Chiseled by the Master's Hand: Lessons from the Life of Peter, ISBN 0-8254-4236-2
- Why Good People Do Bad Things, ISBN 0-8499-1667-4
- When a good man falls, ISBN 0-8969-3361-X
- Growing Through Conflict: Lessons from the Life of David, ISBN 0-8254-4237-0
- Keep Your Dream Alive: Lessons from the Life of Joseph, ISBN 0-8254-4194-3
- Winning The Inner War, ISBN 0-7814-3882-9
- Twelve Myths Americans Believe, ISBN 0-8024-9017-4
- Why the Cross Can Do What Political Can't: When They See You, Do They See Jesus?, ISBN 1-5650-7998-1
- Slandering Jesus: Six Lies People Tell about the Man Who Said He Was God, ISBN 1-4143-1460-4
- All One Body Why Don't We Agree, ISBN 0-8423-0309-X
- Ten Lies About God: And How You Might Already Be Deceived, ISBN 0-8499-1627-5
- Overcoming the Grasshopper Complex, ISBN 0-8969-3826-3
- Measuring Morality: A Comparison of Ethical Systems, ISBN 0-9452-4104-6
- How in This World Can I Be Holy? (with Charles C. Ryrie), ISBN 0-8024-3676-5
- Satan's Evangelistic Strategy for This New Age (with John F. Devries), ISBN 0-8969-3633-3
- The Necessity of Ethical Absolutes, ISBN 0-3103-5791-8
- You're Richer Than You Think, ISBN 0-8820-7777-5
- How to Have a Whole Heart in a Broken World, ISBN 0-8969-3025-4
- Matters of Life and Death: 10 Questions No Serious Christian Can Avoid, ISBN 0-8024-5292-2
- Why Are We the Enemy?, ISBN 0-8024-9367-X
- The Morality Gap : an evangelical response to situation ethics, ISBN 0-8024-5603-0
- Will America Be Given Another Chance? a Message of Challenge and Hope for Today's Spiritual Crisis, ISBN 0-8024-9369-6
- The Church in Babylon: Heeding the Call to Be a Light in the Darkness, ISBN 0-8024-1308-0
- The Eclipse of God: Our Nation's Disastrous Search for a More Inclusive Deity (and What We Must Do About It), ISBN 0-7369-8966-8
