= Alan Redpath =

British clergyman (1907-1989)

Alan Redpath (9 January 1907 – 16 March 1989), was a well-known British evangelist, pastor and author.

== Biography ==
Alan Redpath was born in Newcastle upon Tyne, the only son of James and Christina Redpath. He went to Durham School, and then studied to be chartered accountant in Newcastle, completing this in 1928. He then worked as the chartered accountant for ICI until 1935. In 1936, he joined the Young Life|National Young Life Campaign as an evangelist, where he served until he was called to be pastor of Duke Street Baptist Church in Richmond, London in May 1940. In 1953 he moved to the United States and became the pastor of the Moody Church in Chicago. In 1955, Redpath was elected President of Unevangelized Fields Mission in the United Kingdom. Redpath ministered at Moody Church until 1962. In 1961, Houghton College awarded Redpath an honorary Doctorate of Divinity degree.

Redpath returned to the United Kingdom in 1962 as pastor of Charlotte Baptist Chapel, Edinburgh, Scotland. While at Charlotte Baptist, he suffered a near-fatal stroke in 1964, but was able to recover, although he suffered from deep depression for a period afterwards. He preached there until 1966, when he embarked on ministry as a traveling missionary and conference speaker. In 1969, he became Field Representative for Capernwray Missionary Fellowship, and then in 1975 he was named Pastoral Dean of Capernwray Bible School. Redpath married, and had two daughters. He died on 16 March 1989 in Birmingham, England.

Perhaps his most well-known quote is, "When God wants to do an impossible task, he takes an impossible man, and he crushes him." Other notable quotes are;
"The conversion of a soul is the miracle of a moment, but the manufacture of a saint is the task of a lifetime."
"The Christian life doesn't get easier as one gets older."

== Bibliography ==
Alan Redpath authored the following books:

- Answer for Today (1951)
- Getting to know the Will of God (1955) – an IVF booklet
- Victorious Christian Living : studies in the Book of Joshua (1955)
- Victorious Praying : studies in the family prayer (1956) – on the Lord's Prayer
- Victorious Christian Service : studies in the book of Nehemiah (1958)
- The Royal Route to Heaven : studies in First Corinthians (1960)
- Learning to Live (1961)
- The Making of a Man of God : studies in the life of David (1962)
- Blessings Out of Buffetings : studies in II Corinthians (1965)
- Faith for the times : studies in the prophecy of Isaiah; 2 vols.
  - Part I. The promise of deliverance : ... chapters 40 to 66 (1972)
  - Part II. The plan of deliverance : ... chapters 49 to 54 (1975)
- Captivity to conquest : studies in the prophecy of Isaiah, chapters 40-66 (1978) – originally published as Faith for the times
- Law and liberty : a new look at the Ten Commandments in the light of contemporary society (1978)
- Victorious Christian Faith (1984)

A book of daily readings from his writings was compiled by Marjorie Redpath as

- The Life of Victory (1991), ISBN 0-551-02311-2, republished (2000) ISBN 1-85792-582-3.

== Sources ==
- Wheaton College info on Redpath
- Stroke and its effects
