= Dick Hillis =

American missionary and author (1913–2005)

- Born: February 13, 1913; Victoria, British Columbia, Canada
- Died: December 14, 2005 (aged 92); Ripon, California

Charles Richard Hillis (1913–2005) was an American Protestant Christian missionary to China, author, and founder of "Formosa Crusades", later "Orient Crusades" and "Overseas Crusades", then "OC International", now "One Challenge."

== Early life ==
Hillis was born an American citizen in Victoria, British Columbia, Canada, before the family moved to Monroe, Washington. Hillis was an adventurer. At the age of thirteen in 1926, Dick attended evangelistic meetings at the little Methodist church in town, where his mother served as chairman of the church's missionary committee. It was during these meetings where Dr. George Bennard, (the author of the gospel hymn The Old Rugged Cross) was the guest speaker, that young Dick Hillis was called to go to China as a missionary. He trained for ministry at the Bible Institute of Los Angeles (BIOLA) and graduated in 1932.

== Missionary career ==
At the age of 20, Dick Hillis was on his way to China with the China Inland Mission (CIM) (now OMF International), founded by Hudson Taylor. Hillis was the youngest American missionary candidate ever accepted by the CIM. On December 8, 1934, Hillis' CIM colleagues, John and Betty Stam, were beheaded in Tsingteh. CIM mission headquarters in Shanghai sent word of the Stam's execution to Hillis, who was just completing his first year in China. Hillis reportedly said, "Will I, too, be captured and murdered? Am I going to die here, too, Lord, alone and thousands of miles from home?"

Hillis and his family spent most of World War II in the United States, but returned to China after the war, only to face further conflict between the Chinese Communists and the Chinese Nationalist Party.

In 1950 Hillis and his family were expelled from China, and returned to the United States. Soon after Hillis took a position as the Taiwan director of Youth for Christ, and it was at this time that he formed a traveling evangelistic basketball team, which he renamed Venture for Victory and which led Hillis to form his own mission organization.

In 1951, Hillis left Youth for Christ and founded "Formosa Crusades" as he initially responded to Madam Chiang Kai-Shek's request for men to preach to Chinese Nationalist Army soldiers in Taiwan and then to requests of Taiwanese churches that the visiting teams remain to help in training lay people and church personnel. He became General Director (1951–1970); retired for health reasons and in order to provide full-time spiritual leadership of the mission (1970); briefly assumed the newly created position of President (1976) and upon the appointment of Luis Palau as president was named Vice-president-At-Large to actively assist the mission and participate in missions conferences and seminars.

== Personal life ==
In 1936, Hillis married Margaret Humphrey, a fellow missionary with China Inland Mission. They had six children together. Margaret Hillis died in 1981, and Hillis married Ruth Kopperud in 1982. He died on December 14, 2005.

== Quotes ==
- "Every heart with Christ, a missionary; every heart without Christ, a mission field."
- "God didn't take me to China for what I could do for China, but for what China could do for me."

== Bibliography ==
- Steel In His Soul, by Jan Winebrenner, 1996, WinePress Publishing.
- Developing a Heart for Mission: Five Missionary Heroes, by Roy Robertson, 2002, NavMedia.

== Works ==
- Authored numerous books on missions, particularly based on his own experiences in Asia, as well as on the role of the Holy Spirit in the Christian's life.
- Shall We Forfeit Formosa?, (Zondervan) 1954
- Do We Recognize Red China?, (Zondervan) 1956
- Are the Heathen Really Lost, (Moody Press) 1961
- Unlock the Heavens, (Service Press) 1963
- China Assignment, (Overseas Crusades)1965
- Strange Gods, (Moody Press) 1966
- Born to Climb, (Word Books) 1967
- Inhale the Incense, (Fabrizio Publications) 1970
- Sayings of Mao, Sayings of Jesus, editor, (Regal Books) 1972
- Not Made for Quitting, (Dimension Books) 1973
- How is God Populating Heaven?, (Good Life Productions) 1978
- The Spirit Speaks: Are You Listening?, (Regal Books) 1980
- Listen to the Spirit, with Don Hillis, (Baker Books) 1984
- What If They Haven't Heard?, (Moody Press) 1986
- And I His Servant, (OC International) 2005
