= Billy Graham Hall =

Religious museum in Illinois, USA

Coordinates: 41.8667°N 88.0994°W

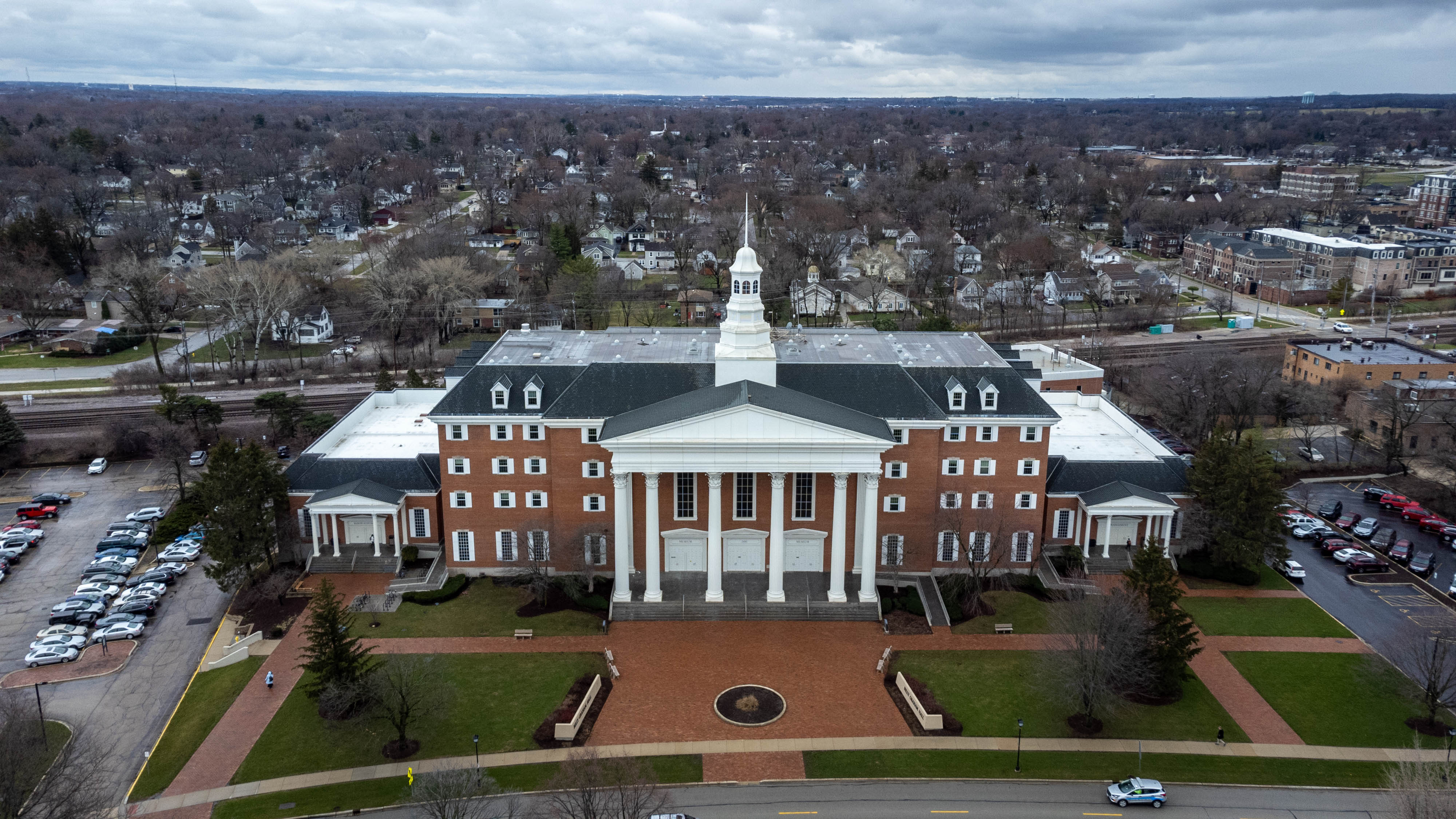
The Billy Graham Hall at Wheaton College.

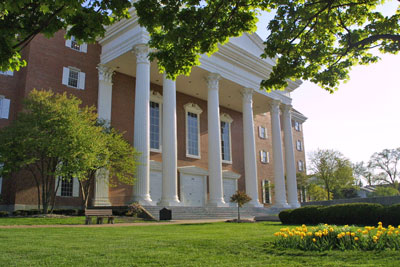
Wheaton College Billy Graham Hall

The Billy Graham Hall (BGH), is an academic building located on the campus of Wheaton College in Wheaton, Illinois. founded and opened in 1981 and named after Wheaton alumni Billy Graham, the center is the primary location for many of the school's bible and theology classes, as well as the graduate school and Liftin Divinity School, as well as the Billy Graham Museum and other academic and administrative departments.

The building was previous called The Billy Graham Center (BGC) but was renamed to distinguish from the North American region of the Lausanne Movement whose offices are housed on the fourth floor. Asides from international evangelism efforts, the center operates as a domestic church planting and social issues think tank on issues of preaching, multiethnic ministry, prison ministry across nine different institutes.

The Wheaton College Billy Graham Center Museum, opened in 1980, is designed to help visitors "extend their understanding of the good news about Jesus", and contains exhibits about the history of Christian evangelism in the United States and the ministry of Billy Graham. Changing exhibits are designed around the themes of evangelism, missions and Christian art.

The center differs from the Billy Graham Library, opened in 2007 in Charlotte, North Carolina; the library serves primarily as an evangelical tool for the Billy Graham Evangelistic Association and is open to the general public.

According to journalist Jeff Sharlet, The Billy Graham Center holds 600 boxes of records for the Christian political organization The Fellowship. In 2020, the building was renamed the Billy Graham Hall.
