= Clinton E. Arnold =

American scholar and academic (born 1958)

- Born: 1958 (age 67–68)

Academic background
- Education: Biola, Talbot Theological Seminary, University of Aberdeen
- Thesis: The Power of God and the Powers of Evil in the Epistle to the Ephesians (1986)
- Doctoral advisor: I. Howard Marshall

Academic work
- Discipline: Biblical studies
- Sub-discipline: NT studies
- Institutions: Talbot School of Theology
- Notable works: Zondervan Illustrated Bible Backgrounds Commentary (in 4 vols.)

Clinton E. Arnold (born 1958) is a New Testament scholar; in late 2025 he is the Research Professor of the New Testament at the Talbot School of Theology at Biola University in California.

== Education and family ==
Arnold earned his B.A.(1980) from Biola, his M.Div. (1983) from the related Talbot Theological Seminary, and his Ph.D. (1986) in New Testament exegesis at the University of Aberdeen. In 1991, he completed post-doctoral studies in the historical context of the epistle to the Colossians at Eberhard Karls Universität Tübingen. Arnold was named the new dean of Talbot School of Theology in May 2012.

Arnold married Barbara (née Erickson) in 1981, and together they have three children.

== Career ==
He was the dean at Talbot School of Theology until 2023 and 2011 president of the Evangelical Theological Society. Arnold's research interest is in the Pauline writings, the book of Acts, Graeco-Roman religions, the rise of Christianity in Asia Minor, and the theology of sanctification (including modern-day exorcism and spiritual warfare). He has authored over a dozen books, dozens of scholarly articles, and several entries in biblical dictionaries and study Bibles. In late 2025, his H-index was 18.

In the past, he served as a regular columnist for Discipleship Journal, and is the general editor of the Zondervan Exegetical Commentary Series.

== Works ==
=== Thesis ===
- Arnold, Clinton E. The Power of God and the Powers of Evil in the Epistle to the Ephesians (PhD). University of Aberdeen.

=== Books ===
- ——— (1989). Ephesians, Power and Magic: the concept of power in Ephesians in light of its historical setting. Society for New Testament Studies, Monograph series. Vol. 63 (1st ed.). Cambridge; New York: Cambridge University Press. ISBN 978-0-521-36236-8. OCLC 17983341.
- ——— (1992). Powers of Darkness: principalities & powers in Paul's letters. Downers Grove, IL: InterVarsity Press. ISBN 978-0-830-81336-0. OCLC 24501366.
- ——— (1996). The Colossian Syncretism: the interface between Christianity and folk belief at Colossae. Grand Rapids, MI: Baker Books. ISBN 978-0-801-02092-6. OCLC 36128980.
- ——— (1997). 3 Crucial Questions about Spiritual Warfare. 3 crucial questions. Grand Rapids, MI: Baker Books. ISBN 978-0-801-05784-7. OCLC 36726467.
- ——— (1997). Power and Magic: the concept of power in Ephesians (2nd ed.). Grand Rapids, MI: Baker Books. ISBN 978-0-801-02143-5. OCLC 37511959.
- ———, ed. (2002). Zondervan Illustrated Bible Backgrounds Commentary: Volume 1. Matthew, Mark, Luke. Grand Rapids, MI: Zondervan. ISBN 978-0-310-21806-7. OCLC 48046272.
- ———, ed. (2002). Zondervan Illustrated Bible Backgrounds Commentary: Volume 2. John, Acts. Grand Rapids, MI: Zondervan. ISBN 978-0-310-21807-4. OCLC 48046272.
- ———, ed. (2002). Zondervan Illustrated Bible Backgrounds Commentary: Volume 3. Romans to Philomon. Grand Rapids, MI: Zondervan. ISBN 978-0-310-21808-1. OCLC 48046272.
- ———, ed. (2002). Zondervan Illustrated Bible Backgrounds Commentary: Volume 4. Hebrews to Revelation. Grand Rapids, MI: Zondervan. ISBN 978-0-310-21809-8. OCLC 48046272.
- (2007) 1 and 2 Thessalonians, 1 and 2 Timothy, Titus
- ——— (2008). How We Got The Bible: a visual journey. Zondervan visual reference series. Grand Rapids, MI: Zondervan. ISBN 978-0-310-25306-8. OCLC 78787748.
- ——— (2010). Ephesians. Zondervan Exegetical Commentary on the New Testament. Vol. 10. Grand Rapids, MI: Zondervan. ISBN 978-0-310-24373-1. OCLC 613646779.
- (2018) A Frustrating Answer to the Christian Faith

=== Articles ===
- ——— (September 3, 2001). "Exorcism 101". Christianity Today. 45 (11): 58.
- ——— (Jan 2002). "What Does the New Testament Mean by a 'Sabbath-Rest'?". Discipleship Journal. 127: 36.
- ——— (Nov 2002). "It's All Greek To Me! Clearing Up the Confusion About Bible Translations". Discipleship Journal. 132: 28–36.
- ——— (Nov 2003). "Using the Computer for Bible Study". Discipleship Journal. 138.
- ——— (2004). "Early Church Catechesis and New Christians Classes in Contemporary Evangelicalism". Journal of the Evangelical Theological Society. 47 (1): 39–54.
- ——— (2005). "I Am Astonished That You Are So Quickly Turning Away! (Gal 1:6): Paul and Anatolian Folk Belief". New Testament Studies. 51 (3): 429–449.
