= Barry H. Corey =

American academic administrator (born 1961)

- Born: November 28, 1961 (age 64); Quincy, Massachusetts, U.S.
- Title: President of Biola University
- Spouse: Paula
- Children: 3

Academic background
- Education: Evangel University (BA); Boston College (MA, PhD)
- Thesis: (1992)

Academic work
- Discipline: Biblical studies
- Institutions: Gordon-Conwell Theological Seminary

Barry H. Corey (born November 28, 1961) is the eighth and current president of Biola University, located in Southern California. Corey became Biola's president on July 1, 2007, succeeding Clyde Cook, who retired after serving as Biola's president for 25 years.

== Early life ==
Corey was born on November 28, 1961, in Massachusetts. Corey received a B.A. in English and biblical studies from Evangel University in Springfield, Missouri, in 1984. In 1988, he received an M.A. in American Studies with a concentration in literature and religious history from Boston College. Corey received a Ph.D. from Boston College in curriculum, instruction and administration (a higher education program) in 1992.

== Career ==
Corey served as the vice president for development at Gordon-Conwell Theological Seminary in South Hamilton, Massachusetts, where he led all external relations and fundraising programs including a $54 million capital campaign. He subsequently served as its vice president/chief academic officer, and academic dean.

An ordained minister, Corey served from 1993 to 2000 as pastor of The Greek Evangelical Church of Boston’s English congregation. When Corey was appointed president of Biola in 2007, he was the first president to come from outside the staff ranks of the university.

== Personal life ==
With his wife Paula, Corey has three children: Anders, Ella and Samuel. He has completed two Boston Marathons, one in 2004 and one in 2006.

== Works ==
- Corey, Barry H. (2016). Love Kindness: Discover the Power of a Forgotten Christian Virtue. Carol Stream, IL: Tyndale House Publishers. ISBN 978-1-4964-1157-0. OCLC 914195612.
- Corey, Barry H.; Moore, Russell (2020). Make the Most of it: A Guide to Loving your College Years. Carol Stream, IL: Tyndale House Publishers. ISBN 978-1-4964-3658-0. OCLC 1119061782.
- Corey, Barry H. (2025). The Treasurer: A Biography of Herbert Stewart Gray (1899-1994). Westbow Press. ISBN 979-8-3850-2599-2. OCLC 1498895173.
