= Robert Partridge (Egyptologist) =

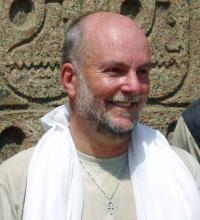
Robert Partridge

Robert Partridge was an Egyptologist, author, and lecturer. He was the editor of the U.K. based magazine Ancient Egypt magazine, produced six times a year, the only UK magazine concentrating solely on ancient Egypt and sold worldwide.

He lectured on many different aspects of ancient Egypt to Egyptology Societies within the U.K and abroad.

He was on the Committee of the Northern Branch of the Egypt Exploration Society and was Chairman of the Manchester Ancient Egypt Society, the largest and oldest of the many provincial Egyptology Societies in the UK.

He owned and ran the Ancient Egypt Picture Library and was a photographer with a collection of over 30,000 images of the ancient and more recent archaeological sites. These images were used for his lectures and courses and also supplied to publishers and television companies.

Partridge organised specialist trips to Egypt to visit the main, but also some of the more obscure and less visited sites, acting as team leader.

He had been an Egyptological advisor to several Television programmes and also to filmmakers, including appearances in documentaries. He had also helped with museum exhibits, providing images and text, at the Egypt Centre, Swansea, and the Bagshaw Museum in Yorkshire.

He has been quoted by the BBC on their news website.

On 5 April 2010 he was interviewed on The One Show on BBC1.

Partridge died on 10 July 2011, following a long illness.

== Bibliography ==
- Faces of Pharaohs: Royal Mummies and Coffins from Ancient Thebes. (1994)
- Transport in Ancient Egypt. (1996)
- O Horrable Murder: The Trial, Execution and Burial of King Charles I. (1998) ISBN 0-948695-58-7
- Fighting Pharaohs: Weapons and Warfare in Ancient Egypt. (2002)
