= Robert Partridge (writer) =

English detective novel writer

Robert Partridge (born c. 1954), known also by his pen name Peter Grainger, is an English novelist. He was born in England. He obtained a degree in English literature, and became an English teacher, teaching for twenty years at Cromwell Community College in Chatteris.

In 2012 he wrote a novel, Afon, under his real name, with a protagonist named Peter Grainger. He wrote two more novels and a book of short stories but was unable to find a publisher, so he self-published them on Kindle. Partridge began earning about £30 a month from the books, and realized that to earn more he would have to write a series. He chose detective novels, though he had not read any, as he was uninterested in writing romance or fantasy fiction, the two most popular genres. He wrote An Accidental Death under the pseudonym Peter Grainger; the lead character was D. C. Smith, a police sergeant in King's Lake, a fictionalized version of King's Lynn, in Norfolk.

He has since published fifteen more books in the series and they have sold well. Almost half a million copies of his work have been sold on Kindle, and in 2016 Tantor Media published audio versions of the books, with Gildart Jackson narrating them. More than half a million copies of the audiobooks have been sold, and as of 2025 the first three were scheduled to be recorded in Swedish. The books were published in physical form in English in the UK and US starting in May 2016.

The D. C. Smith and King's Lake series have been acquired by Hutchinson Heinemann in the UK, and Union Square in the US, and are scheduled for publication in physical form in 2026 in the UK, and during 2026 and 2027 in the US. Rights to the books have also been acquired by local publishers in Germany, Finland, France, the Netherlands, and Turkey.

== Works ==
=== DC Smith / Kings Lake series ===
- An Accidental Death (2013)
- But for the Grace (2014)
- Luck and Judgement (2015)
- Persons of Interest (2015)
- In This Bright Future (2016)
- The Rags of Time (2016)
- Time and Tide (2017)
- A Private Investigation (2018)
- Songbird (2019)
- On Eden Street (2020)
- Roxanne (2020)
- The Truth (2021)
- Missing Pieces (2021)
- The Camera Man (2023)
- Another Girl (2023)
- The Late Lord Thorpe (2024)
- Some Sort of Justice (2026)

=== Willows and Lane series ===
- Lane (2017)
- One-way Tickets (2018)
- Arcadia (2022)

=== Other works (as Robert Partridge) ===
- Afon (2012)
- The Rink (2012)
- Asher (2013)
- Paris and Other Love Stories (2014; short stories)
