= Biola University =

Christian university in La Mirada, California, US

- Former names: Bible Institute of Los Angeles (1908–1949); Biola College (1949–1981)
- Motto: Above All Give Glory to God
- Type: Private university
- Established: February 25, 1908; 118 years ago
- Religious affiliation: Nondenominational Evangelicalism
- Academic affiliations: CCCU
- Endowment: $146 million (2023)
- President: Barry H. Corey
- Provost: Matthew J. Hall
- Faculty: 411
- Undergraduates: 3,596 (2022)
- Postgraduates: 1,959 (2022)
- Location: La Mirada, California, United States; 33°54′20″N 118°01′00″W
- Campus: Suburban, 96 acres (39 ha)
- Colors: Red, White, Electric Blue
- Nickname: Eagles
- Sporting affiliations: NCAA Division II – PacWest
- Website: biola.edu

Biola University (/baɪˈoʊlə/) is a private, nondenominational, evangelical Christian university in La Mirada, California, United States. It was founded in 1908 as the Bible Institute of Los Angeles as a center for biblical and missionary training. Its campus in downtown Los Angeles featured iconic "Jesus Saves" signs and a 3,500-seat auditorium. In 1949, it became Biola College and later adopted the name Biola University in 1981. The school relocated to La Mirada, California, in 1959 and has maintained a strong evangelical identity rooted in traditional theology, as reflected in its association with The Fundamentals: A Testimony to the Truth.

Over the years, Biola expanded its academic offerings beyond biblical studies, adding multiple schools and graduate programs including the Talbot Theological Seminary, Rosemead Graduate School of Professional Psychology, School of Intercultural Studies, Crowell School of Business, and School of Education. Today, Biola offers 47 undergraduate majors, over 150 professional fields of study and degrees ranging from B.A. to Ph.D., all integrated with Christian doctrine.

Biola is also known for its conferences, centers, and athletics. It hosts annual events such as the Missions Conference and the Torrey Memorial Bible Conference. The university supports several academic centers, including the Center for Christian Thought and the Center for Christianity, Culture and the Arts. Athletically, the Biola Eagles compete in NCAA Division II within the Pacific West Conference, fielding 18 varsity sports.

== History ==
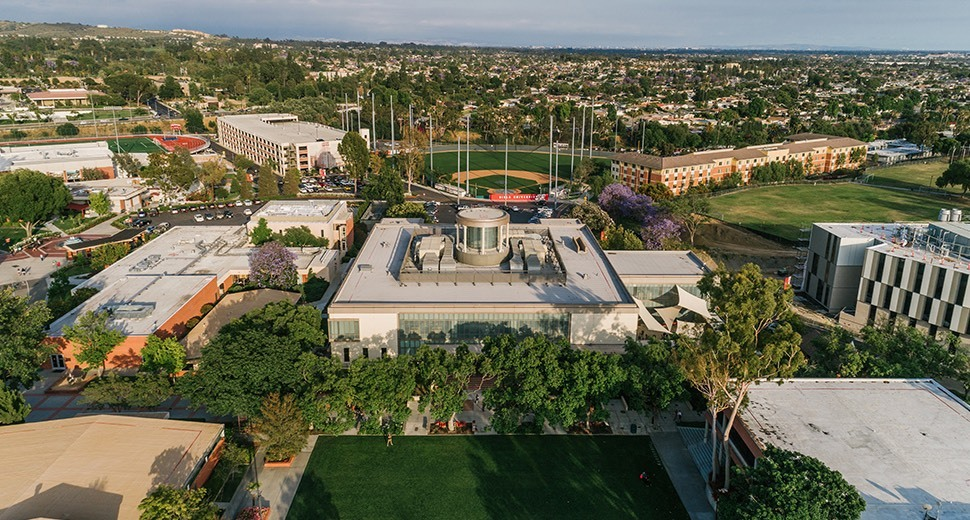
Aerial view of La Mirada Biola campus 2026

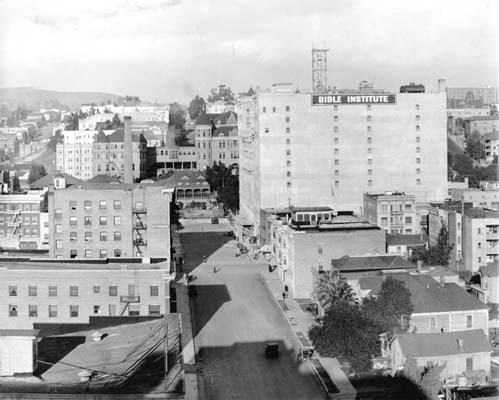
Biola's former Los Angeles building, during construction, c. 1912

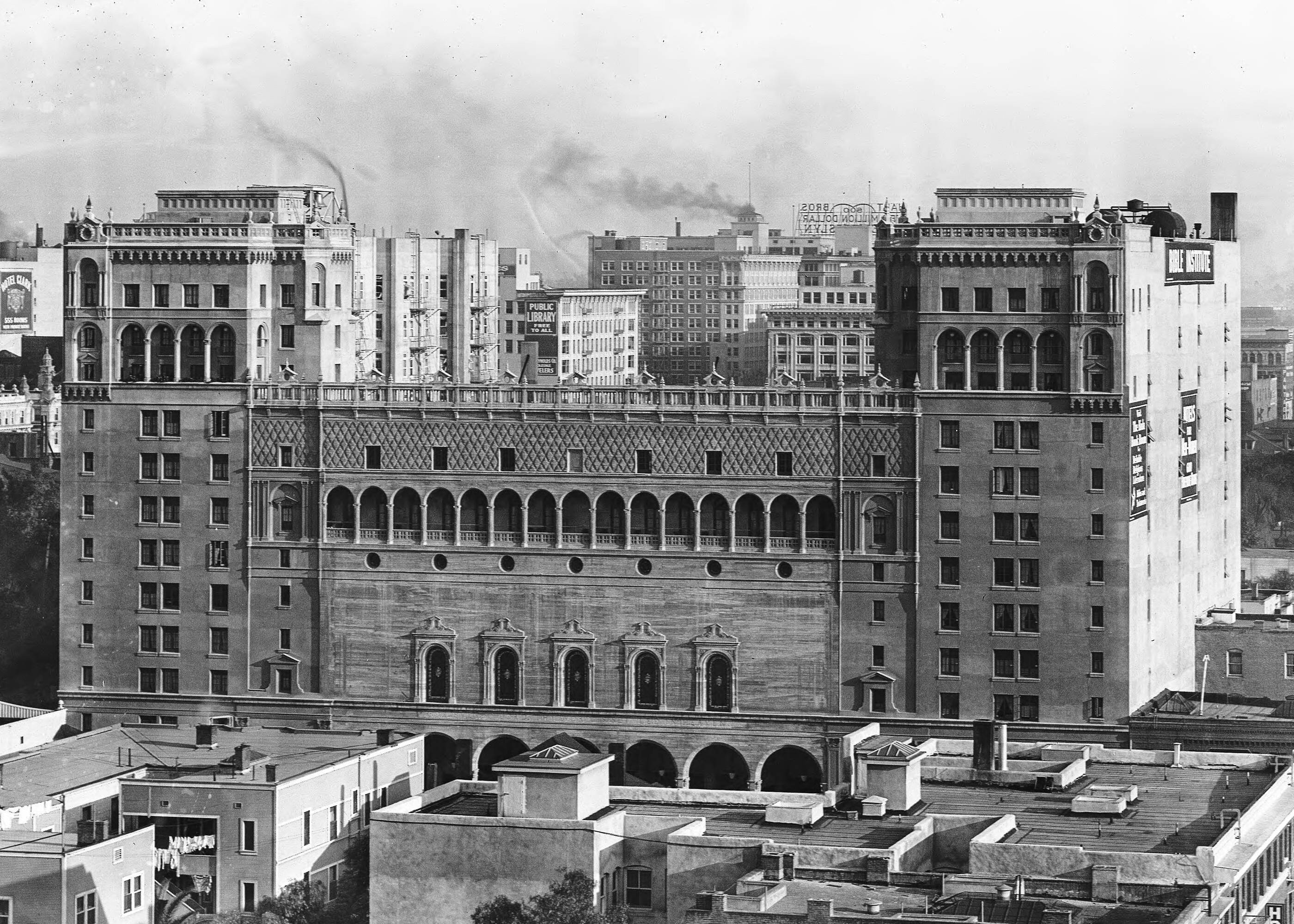
Biola's former Los Angeles building, c. 1916. It was demolished in 1988, after damage in the 1987 Whittier Narrows earthquake.

Biola University was founded in 1908 as the Bible Institute of Los Angeles by Lyman Stewart, president of the Union Oil Company of California; Thomas C. Horton, a Presbyterian minister and author; and Augustus B. Prichard, also a Presbyterian minister.

In 1912, the institute appointed R. A. Torrey as dean, and in 1913 began construction on a building at the corner of Sixth and Hope St. in downtown Los Angeles, which included a 3,500-seat auditorium, two large neon signs (added later) on top of the building proclaiming "Jesus Saves", and a carillon of 11 bells hymns are played three times daily. The early leaders wanted the institute to focus on training students in the Bible and missions rather than the broad approach to Christian education typical of Christian liberal arts colleges. The institute offered a diploma after completion of a two-year curriculum. This model was based largely on the Moody Bible Institute. Beginning in the 1920s, attempts were made to broaden the curriculum, but it was not until 1949 that the institution took the name "Biola College" and in 1981 was renamed "Biola University". Biola re-located to La Mirada, California, in 1959.

The school has a tradition of conservative theology, documented in the 1917 four-volume version of The Fundamentals: A Testimony To The Truth.

As of 1925, John Murdoch MacInnis was the school's second dean. He was a Presbyterian minister who had been an instructor at the school for about two years. MacInnis served as dean until his forced resignation on December 31, 1928. His administration had been turbulent. In 1927, Biola published a book by MacInnis entitled Peter the Fisherman Philosopher, which became the focus of an intense national controversy in which MacInnis was accused by fundamentalists of advocating liberal theological positions. Eventually, MacInnis was forced to resign, and all remaining copies of the book, along with the printing plates, were destroyed.

In 1929, Charles E. Fuller a businessman, evangelist, and graduate of Biola, was drafted as vice president to find a new dean and a president. Elbert McCreery and William P. White, both associated with Moody Bible Institute, were chosen to fill these posts.

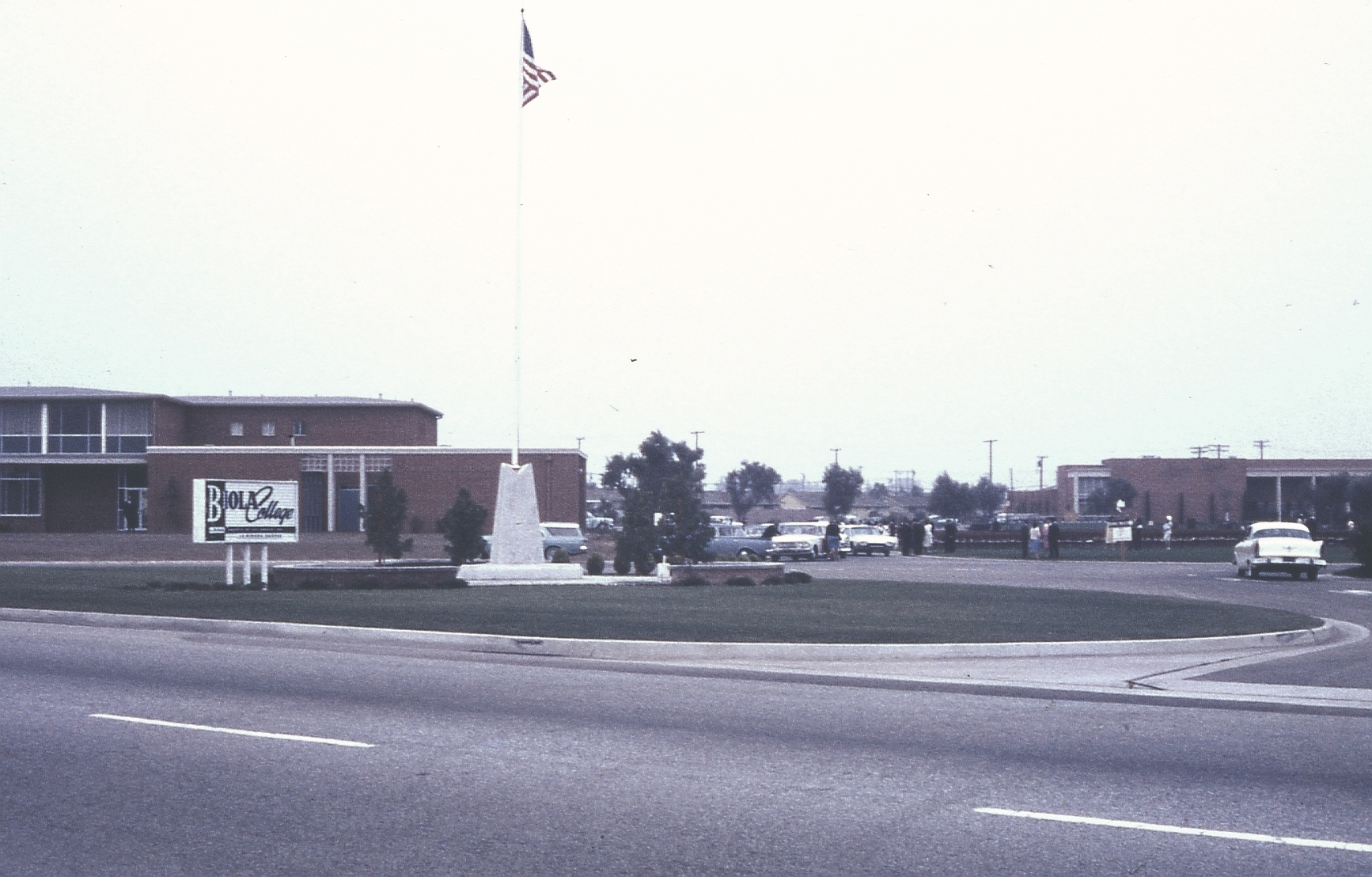
Biola's campus in La Mirada, June 1963

During the Great Depression, the institute suffered serious financial difficulties. In 1932, Louis T. Talbot, pastor of the Church of the Open Door, assumed the presidency and helped raise much-needed funds. During the next two decades, Talbot concentrated efforts on academic programs as the school's mission. Talbot Theological Seminary became Biola's first graduate school and in 1977, Biola acquired the graduate programs of Rosemead Graduate School of Professional Psychology and relocated them to the La Mirada campus. Biola added a School of Intercultural Studies in 1983, through funds from the abandoned property of the Hunan Bible Institute in China, a School of Business in 1993, a School of Education in 2007, and a School of Arts and Letters in 2026.

=== Presidents ===
- William P. White (1929–1932)
- Louis T. Talbot (1932–1935)
- Paul W. Rood (1935–1938)
- Louis T. Talbot (1938–1952)
- Samuel H. Sutherland (1952–1970)
- J. Richard Chase (1970–1982)
- Clyde Cook (1982–2007)
- Barry Corey (2007– )

== Conferences ==
Biola holds two annual student conferences, the Missions Conference during the spring semester and the Torrey Memorial Bible Conference during the fall semester.

The Torrey Memorial Bible Conference is also a three-day conference dedicated to students' spiritual growth. Every year, a specific topic is chosen that is geared towards the typical college student's spiritual needs.

The university also holds the Biola Media Conference, an event for Christian entertainment professionals to increase their skills.

On November 16, 1996, the university hosted the first national conference on intelligent design. Later, Intervarsity Press published Mere Creation, a collection of the papers presented at the conference. Subsequent intelligent-design conferences were held at the university in 2002 and 2004.

Since 2015, Biola requires students to attend five conference sessions and twenty chapel services per semester, or face a financial penalty.

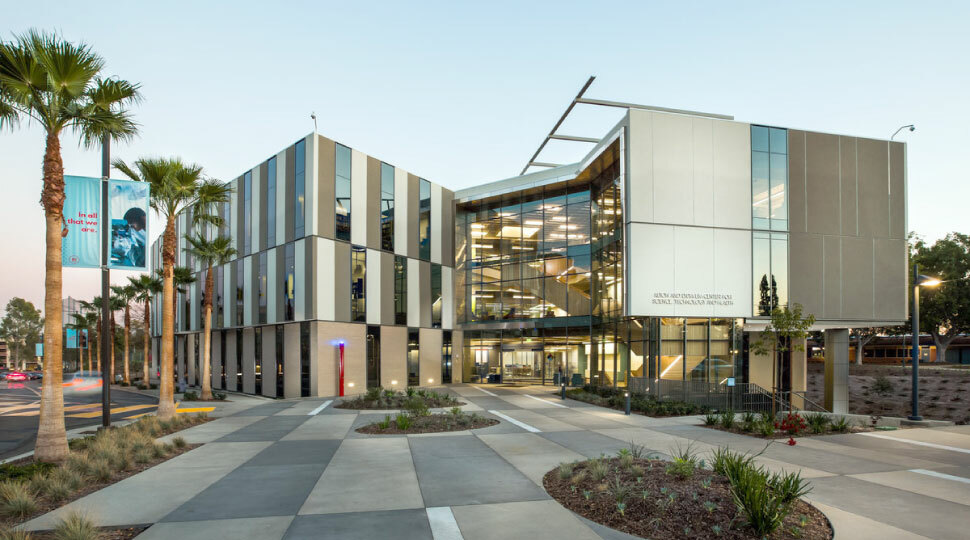
Lim Center for Science, Technology & Health

== Academics ==
=== Schools ===
Academic rankings

National
- Forbes: 335 of 500
- U.S. News & World Report: 236 (tie) of 394
- Washington Monthly: 429 of 442
- WSJ/College Pulse: 501 (tie) of 600

Biola offers 47 undergraduate majors, 80 concentrations, and more than 150 professional fields of study. Degrees awarded include B.A., B.S., B.M., B.F.A., M.A., M.B.A., M.Div., Th.M., D.Min., D.Miss., Psy.D., Ed.D., and PhD. All are institutionally and professionally accredited and integrated with Christian doctrine.

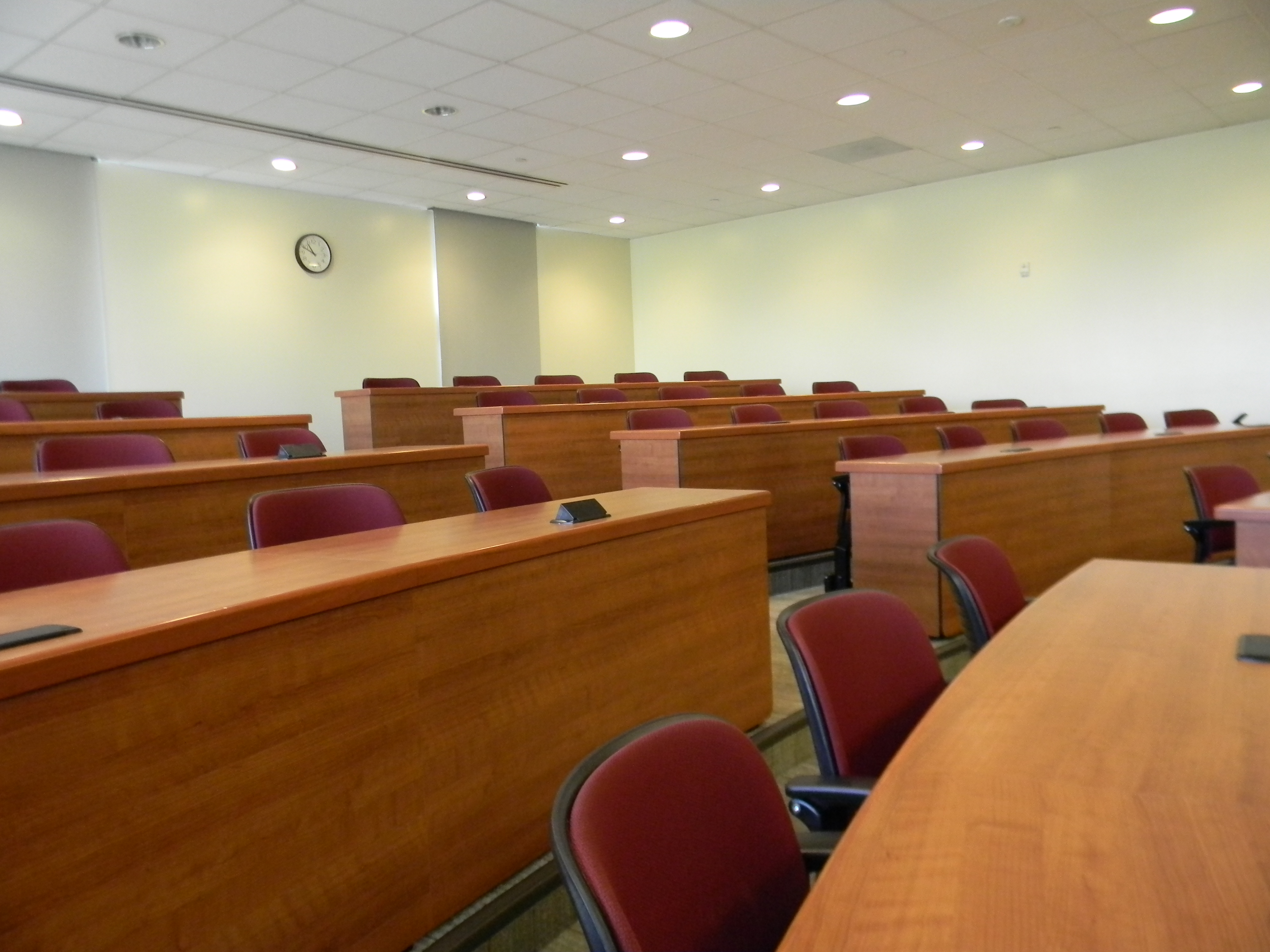
Lecture hall at Biola University in La Mirada, California

The schools are:

- Crowell School of Business
- Rosemead School of Psychology
- School of Arts and Letters
- School of Education
- Cook School of Intercultural Studies
- Talbot School of Theology
- School of Science, Technology and Health
- Snyder School of Cinema and Media Arts

Crowell School of Business is an undergraduate and graduate business school located in La Mirada, California, at Biola University. In 1993, the school was established as the fifth school of Biola University. In 2005, the school was renamed the Crowell School of Business.

Crowell offers a Master of Business Administration (MBA) and a Masters in Professional Accountancy (MPAcc), both of which can be obtained through a full-time or part-time schedule. Both programs are accredited through the Western Association of Schools and Colleges; the MBA program is also accredited by the Accreditation Council for Business Schools and Programs. The undergraduate program at Crowell offers majors in accounting and in business administration with emphasis in international business, management, marketing, marketing management and business analytics. The school offers a minor in business administration available to all undergraduates at Biola University. The undergraduate program enrolls approximately four hundred students.

The School of Education was established in 2007, originally started as the Education Department in 1952. It offers biblically integrated courses and programs that exist to train those who desire to make an impact as educators and administrators in public, private, homeschool, charter and international schools. At the undergraduate level, the School of Education is home to the elementary education, multidisciplinary majors and liberal studies, which consistently rank among the most popular undergraduate majors at Biola. At the graduate level, the School of Education offers Master of Arts in Teaching and Master of Arts in Education programs.

The School of Arts and Letters was founded in 2026, a merger between the University's previous School of Humanities and Social Science and School of Fine Arts and Communications. The current school has 3 divisions including the Division of Visual Arts and Performing Arts, the Division of Communication and the Division of Humanities and Social Sciences. The School offers over 14 majors and over 20 minors to students. The motto of the school is "think deeply, express boldly, and lead faithfully".

All undergraduate students are required to take 30 units of Bible classes, regardless of their major.

In its 2017 college rankings, U.S. News & World Report placed Biola in its "Best National Universities" category, ranking Biola 159 out of 311 national universities. Biola was one of only two national universities in the Council for Christian Colleges and Universities (CCCU) to be included in the first tier. In 2013, Biola was listed as one of nineteen "up-and-coming" national universities by U.S. News. In 2017, Niche ranked Biola as #33 of 364 best Christian colleges in America and #11 of 90 safest college campuses in California.

=== Honors program ===
Torrey Honors College, formerly Torrey Honors Institute, is a classical literature great books program started by John Mark Reynolds in 1995 and named after Reuben Archer Torrey. Classes in the department are used to meet most of the general education requirements at Biola University in four years; the program does not offer a major or minor. The Torrey Honors College is patterned after the Oxford tutorial system, employing reading, discussion, writing, mentoring, and lectures.

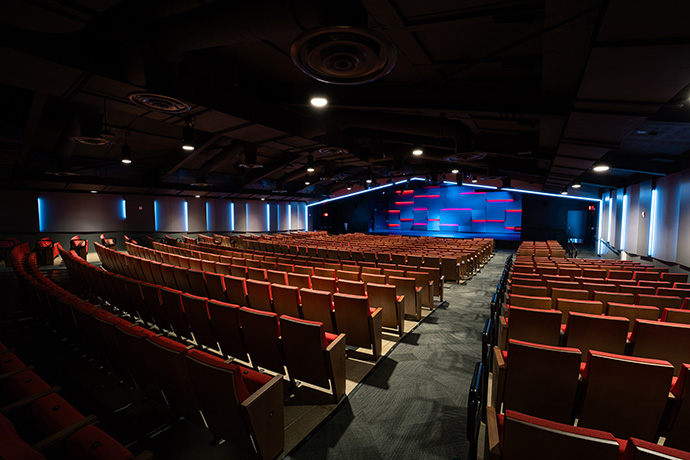
Ethel Lee Auditorium

== Student organizations ==
Biola has over 40 student organizations and clubs including 25 Academic and Career Clubs, 9 Cultural Heritage Clubs, 5 Performance and Publishing Clubs, 10 Political and Social Cause Clubs, 13 Recreation and Sports Clubs, 17 Shared Interest and Community Building Clubs, and 3 Other Student Groups.

Biola also has a Student Government Association (SGA) with both hired and student elected positions.

== Athletics ==
The Biola athletic teams are called the Eagles. The university is a member of the Division II level of the National Collegiate Athletic Association (NCAA), primarily competing in the Pacific West Conference (PacWest) since the 2017–18 academic year; while its men's and women's swimming & diving teams compete in the Pacific Collegiate Swim and Dive Conference (PCSC). They were also a member of the National Christian College Athletic Association (NCCAA), primarily competing as an independent in the West Region of the Division I level. The Eagles previously competed in the Golden State Athletic Conference (GSAC) of the National Association of Intercollegiate Athletics (NAIA) from 1994–95 to 2016–17.

Biola competes in 18 intercollegiate varsity sports: Men's sports include baseball, basketball, cross country, soccer, swimming, tennis, track & field and water polo; while women's sports include basketball, cross country, golf, soccer, softball, swimming, tennis, track & field, volleyball and water polo. Former sports included men's golf and men's wrestling.

=== Hall of Fame ===
In 2012, Biola inducted three alumni into Inaugural Athletics Hall of Fame. The athletics department inducted Todd Worrell (baseball), Becky White (volleyball and women's basketball) and Wade Kirchmeyer (men's basketball). The school has since inducted 14 more alumni, including: Jim Blagg, Clyde Cook, Musa Dogonyaro, Ronn Johnson, Natasha Miller, Ben Orr, Jessica Pistole, Rianne Schorel and Tim Worrell.

=== Club sports ===
Biola also has a club men's lacrosse team that competed in the Western Collegiate Lacrosse League (WCLL) from 2001–2009, and has since competed in the Southwestern Lacrosse Conference (SLC). A club women's lacrosse team began competition in 2012 in the Western Women's Lacrosse League (WWLL). Biola also has a club men's rugby team that began playing in the SCRFU in 2013.

=== Move to NCAA Division II ===
On July 20, 2016, Biola University's application for membership into the NCAA Division II had been approved for the three-year membership process. The Eagles continued as an active member of the GSAC and the NAIA for the 2016–17 school year while completing Provisional Year One with the NCAA. In Provisional Year Two (2017–18), Biola joined the PacWest Conference and competed primarily against NCAA opponents. With successful completion of Provisional Year Three (2018–19) of the membership process, the Eagles will gain full, active NCAA D-II membership and become eligible to compete for NCAA Division II championships beginning as early as 2019–20.

== Centers ==
Biola has five university centers:

- Center for Christian Thought
- Center for Christianity, Culture and the Arts
- Center for Marriage and Relationships
- Center for the Study of the Work and Ministry of the Holy Spirit Today
- Center for Messianic Jewish Studies

In 2012, the Biola University Center for Christian Thought (CCT) was launched, funded by a $3.03 million grant from the John Templeton Foundation, the largest academic grant ever awarded to Biola University. The CCT is a forum where leading Christian thinkers from around the world gather to research and discuss issues of significance to the academy, the church, and the broader culture. In 2013, the Biola University Center for Christianity, Culture and the Arts (CCCA) was launched, funded with a grant from philanthropists Howard and Roberta Ahmanson's Fieldstead and Company. The CCCA sponsors events and symposia, produces online resources and strives to facilitate thoughtful reflection on the interplay of Christian faith, the larger culture and the world of the arts.

In October 2014, Biola launched the Center for Marriage and Relationships (CMR). The center exists to build and sustain healthy relationships and marriages in the church and broader culture.

In Fall of 2017, Biola launched the Center for the Study of the Work and Ministry of the Holy Spirit Today, funded by a $3 million donation. Located within Talbot School of Theology, the center is a 10-year initiative that provides resources for students and scholars.

=== Center for Messianic Jewish Studies ===
On October 8, 2007, Biola opened the Charles L. Feinberg Center for Messianic Jewish Studies in Manhattan. The center offers a master's degree in divinity in Messianic Jewish studies in cooperation with Chosen People Ministries.

== Publications ==
The university has been involved in the publication of the following magazines and academic journals:

- The King's Business was a monthly publication of Biola from 1910 to 1970. In the first decades of its publication, it was the leading journal for conservative Christianity and the early fundamentalist movement. In fact, The Fundamentals and The King's Business shared the same chief editor (R. A. Torrey) and were supported by the same "concerned laymen" (Lyman and Milton Stewart).
- Philosophia Christi is a peer-reviewed journal published twice a year by the Evangelical Philosophical Society with the support of Biola University as a vehicle for the scholarly discussion of philosophy and philosophical issues in the fields of ethics, theology, and religion. The journal is indexed by The Philosopher's Index and Religious and Theological Abstracts.
- Journal of Psychology and Theology has as its purpose to communicate recent scholarly thinking on the interrelationships of psychological and theological concepts, and to consider the application of these concepts to a variety of professional settings. The major intent of the editor is to place before the evangelical community articles that have bearing on the nature of humankind from a Biblical perspective.
- Journal of Spiritual Formation and Soul Care has as its purpose advancing the discussion of the theory and practice of Christian formation and soul care for the sake of the educational ministries of the church, Christian education, and other para-church organizations through scholarly publications that are rooted in Biblical exegesis, systematic theology, the history of Christian spirituality, philosophical analysis, psychological theory/research, spiritual theology, and Christian experience.
- Christian Education Journal has as its purpose to strengthen the conception and practice of Christian education in church and para-church settings.
- Great Commission Research Journal is a peer-reviewed journal devoted to research and scholarly thinking on church growth.
- Biola Magazine is the official magazine of Biola University.
- Talbot Magazine is the official magazine of Talbot School of Theology.
- The Chimes is Biola's student newspaper.
- The Point is a magazine produced by Biola's journalism program that won the 2008 Associated Collegiate Press Pacemaker Award, the highest honor for a collegiate magazine.
- The Inkslinger is a student creative arts journal.
- The Bells is a humorous, fictitious news site created by and for Biola students. The Bells is a satire similar to The Onion.
- Open Biola is an online database allowing visitors from anywhere in the world to easily search, stream, download and share videos and other learning materials that engage academic topics from a Christian perspective.

== Notable alumni ==
- Steve Bridges (class of 1986), comedian, impressionist, and actor
- Clyde Cook (class of 1957), missionary, professor, and university president
- Scott Derrickson (class of 1990), director, screenwriter and producer
- Sikhanyiso Dlamini (class of 2010), Princess of Eswatini
- Charles E. Fuller (class of 1921), Christian clergyman and radio evangelist
- Judith Hill (class of 2006), singer-songwriter
- Dick Hillis (class of 1932), missionary and missions executive
- Michael Horton (class of 1985), theologian and academic
- JD Gunn (class of 2022), Panamanian footballer
- Mark Joseph (class of 1990), producer and author
- Kristina Karamo (class of 2020), leader of the Michigan Republican Party, former candidate for 2022 Michigan Secretary of State
- Zach King (class of 2012), filmmaker and YouTube personality
- Josh McDowell (class of 1971), Christian apologist, evangelist, and writer
- Harold A. Netland, philosopher and academic
- Trevor Oaks, professional baseball player
- Amanda Otto (class of 2016), dog musher
- Nabeel Qureshi (class of 2008), author and Christian apologist
- Cassie Randolph (class of 2016), television personality and winner of The Bachelor
- Tobin Sorenson (class of 1980), mountain climber
- John Thune (class of 1983), U.S. Senate Majority Leader since 2025, Republican U.S. Senator from South Dakota since 2005
- Larry Tieu (class of 2007), professional basketball player
- Tim Worrell (class of 1990), former professional baseball player
- Todd Worrell (class of 1982), former professional baseball player
- Danny Yamashiro (class of 1991), chaplain at Massachusetts Institute of Technology (MIT), researcher on American presidents and childhood trauma, and media talk show host

== Notable current and previous faculty ==
- Clinton E. Arnold, New Testament scholar and dean of Talbot School of Theology
- Christopher Castile, adjunct professor of political science
- William Lane Craig, research professor of philosophy
- J. Vernon McGee, professor of Bible and department chair
- J. P. Moreland, Distinguished Professor of Philosophy
- Scott B. Rae, Old Testament scholar and dean of the Faculty of Talbot School of Theology
- Bernard Ramm, Baptist theologian and apologist
- Robert L. Saucy, Distinguished Professor of Systematic Theology
- J. Warner Wallace, adjunct professor of apologetics
