= John MacArthur bibliography =

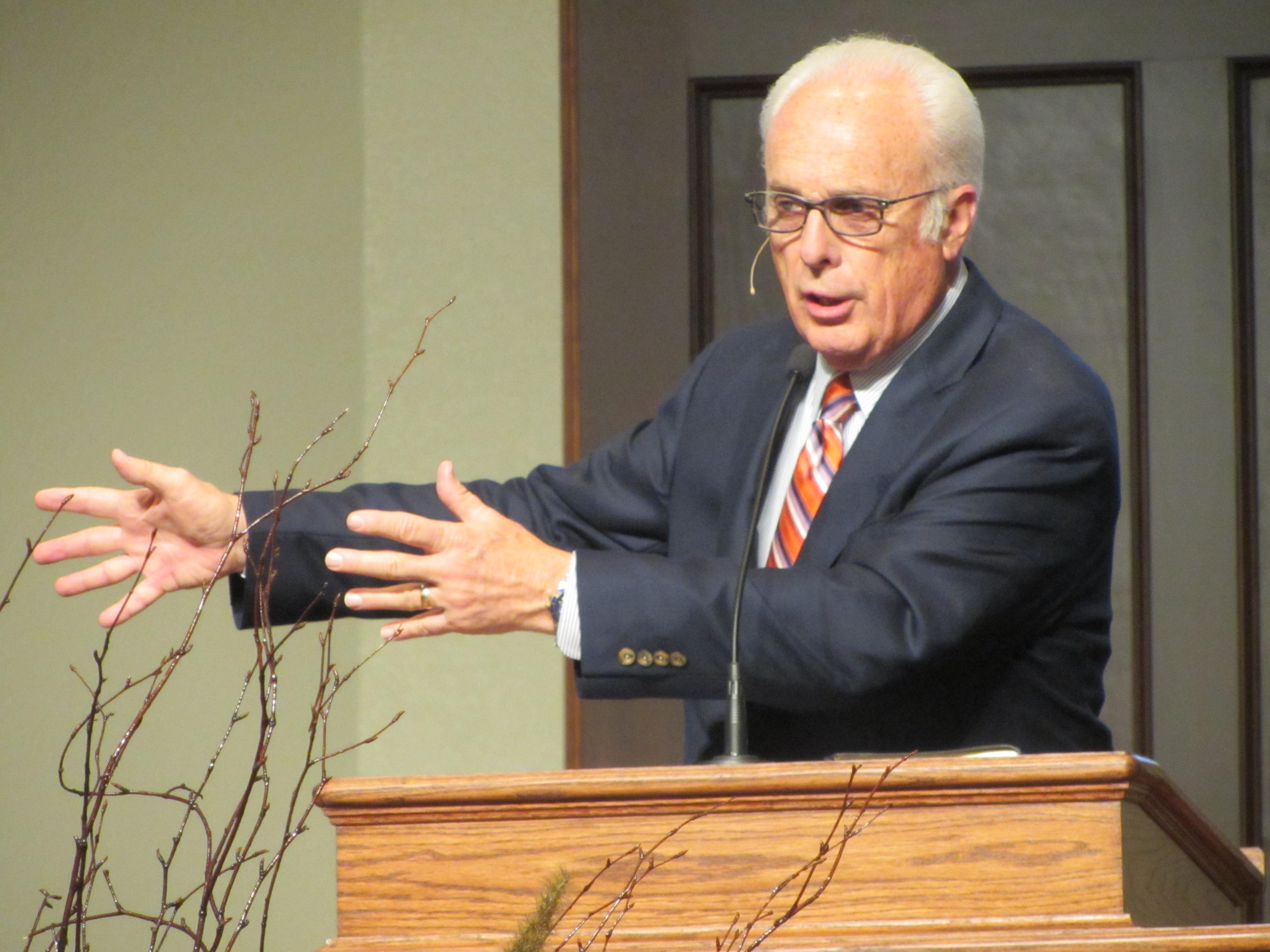
John MacArthur in 2013

This is a list of all published works of John F. MacArthur, an evangelical Bible expositor, pastor-teacher of Grace Community Church, and president of The Master's Seminary, in Sun Valley, California. In addition to more than 150 individual books and monographs, MacArthur has also contributed to more than 30 multi-author works. His publications have been translated into more than two dozen languages, including ten or more titles each in French, Spanish, Romanian, German, Korean, Russian, Portuguese, and Italian.

A 2001 Duke Divinity School survey asking pastors "...what three authors do you read most often...?" concluded that MacArthur was among the top twelve for Conservative Protestants. A similar 2005 study by The Barna Group concluded that he was one of six authors "who had the greatest number of influential books listed by pastors."

== Bibles ==
- The MacArthur Study Bible (1997) Word
- The MacArthur Topical Bible (1999) Word
- The MacArthur Student Bible (2001) Word
- MacArthur Daily Bible (2003) Thomas Nelson
- The MacArthur Study Bible: New American Standard Version (2006) Thomas Nelson
- The MacArthur Study Bible: English Standard Version (2009) Crossway
- The MacArthur Study Bible: New International Version (2013) Thomas Nelson
- The Macarthur Study Bible: Legacy Standard Version (2024) The Lockman Foundation

== Commentary and Bible study ==
- Liberated for Life (Galatians) (1975) Regal
- Beware the Pretenders (Jude) (1980) Victor
- How to Study the Bible (1985, 2009) Moody ISBN 0-8024-5303-1
- How to Get the Most from God's Word: An Everyday Guide to Enrich Your Study of the Bible (1997) Word
- MacArthur's Quick Reference Guide to the Bible (2002) Word
- MacArthur Bible Handbook (2003) Thomas Nelson
- MacArthur Scripture Memory System (2003) Nelson Reference & Electronic Publishing

=== The MacArthur New Testament Commentaries ===
published by Moody Press

- Hebrews (1983)
- 1 Corinthians (1984)
- Matthew 1-7 (1985)
- Ephesians (1986)
- Galatians (1987)
- Matthew 8-15 (1987)
- Matthew 16-23 (1988)
- Matthew 24-28 (1989)
- Romans 1-8 (1991)
- Colossians/Philemon (1992)
- Acts 1-12 (1994)
- Romans 9-16 (1994)
- 1 Timothy (1995)
- 2 Timothy (1995)
- Acts 13-28 (1996)
- Titus (1996)
- Revelation 1-11 (1999)
- Revelation 12-22 (2000)
- Philippians (2001)
- 1 & 2 Thessalonians (2002)
- 2 Corinthian (2003)
- James (2003)
- 1 Peter (2005)
- 2 Peter and Jude (2005)
- John 1-11 (2006)
- 1-3 John (2007)
- John 12-21 (2008)
- Luke 1-5 (2009)
- Luke 6-10 (2011)
- Luke 11-17 (2013)

=== MacArthur Bible Studies ===
published by Word

- 1 & 2 Peter (2000)
- 1 Samuel (2000) Word
- Acts (2000) Word
- Daniel (2000) Word
- Ephesians (2000) Word
- Galatians (2000) Word
- John (2000) Word
- Mark (2000) Word
- Romans (2000) Word
- Ruth & Esther (2000) Word
- 1 & 2 Timothy (2001) Word
- 1 Corinthians (2001) Word
- Hebrews (2001) Word
- James (2001) Word
- Nehemiah (2001) Word
- Revelation (2001) Word

published by Nelson Impact (a division of Thomas Nelson)

- 1 Corinthians (2006)
- Mark (2006)
- Acts (2006)
- Galatians (2006)
- John (2006)
- Romans (2006)

=== MacArthur Study Series ===
first published by Victor, then by David C. Cook

- Saved Without a Doubt: Being Sure of Your Salvation (1992, 2006) ISBN 0-7814-4337-7
- Alone with God: Rediscovering the Power and Passion of Prayer (1995, 2006) ISBN 0-7814-4429-2
- First Love: The Joy and Simplicity of Life in Christ (1995) ISBN 1-56476-344-7
- The Power of Suffering: Strengthening Your Faith in the Refiner's Fire (1995) ISBN 1-56476-429-X
- The Power of Suffering: Strengthening Your Faith in the Refiner's Fire (repackaged) (2005) David C Cook ISBN 0-7814-0587-4
- Standing Strong: How to Resist the Enemy of Your Soul (2006) ISBN 0-7814-4361-X
- Divine Design: God's Complementary Roles for Men and Women (2006) ISBN 0-7814-4367-9
- Anxious for Nothing: God's Cure for the Cares of Your Soul (2006) ISBN 0-7814-4338-5
- The Believer's Walk With Christ (2017) ISBN 0-8024-1519-9
- The Shepherd as Theologian (2017) ISBN 0-7369-6211-5

== Individual books ==
=== 1970s ===
- The Church: The Body of Christ (1973) Zondervan
- Found: God's Will (1973, 1977) Victor
- Can a Man Live Again? (1975) Moody
- Keys to Spiritual Growth (1976) Revell
- Focus on Fact: Why You Can Trust the Bible (1977) Revell
- God's Plan for Giving (1977) Western Baptist Press
- Giving: God's Way (1978) Tyndale
- The Charismatics: A Doctrinal Perspective (1978) Zondervan

=== 1980s ===
- Kingdom Living: Here and Now (1980) Moody
- Take God's Word For It (1980) Regal
- Why Believe the Bible (1980) Regal
- Jesus' Pattern of Prayer (1981) Moody
- Body Dynamics (1982) Victor
- The Family (1982) Moody
- Your Family (1982) Moody
- The Ultimate Priority (1983) Moody
- Why I Trust the Bible (1983) Victor
- The Legacy of Jesus (1986) Moody
- The Gospel According to Jesus (1988), Zondervan (Note: Revised and expanded in 1994.)
- The Lordship Controversy (1988) Word of Grace Communications
- When the Healing Doesn't Come (1988) Word of Grace Communications
- You Can Trust the Bible (1988) Moody
- God With Us: The Miracle of Christmas (1989), Zondervan (Note: Republished in 1993 as The Miracle of Christmas.)
- Shepherdology (1989) The Master's Fellowship

=== 1990s ===
- Keys to Spiritual Growth (1991) Revell
- Our Sufficiency in Christ (1991) Word
- The Master's Plan for the Church (1991) Moody
- Charismatic Chaos (1992) Zondervan
- How to Meet the Enemy (1992) ChariotVictor Publishing
- Rediscovering Expository Preaching (1992) Word
- Anxiety Attacked: Apply Scripture to the Cares of the Soul (1993) ChariotVictor Publishing
- Ashamed of the Gospel: When the Church Becomes Like the World (1993) Crossway
- Drawing Near (1993) Crossway
- Faith Works: The Gospel According to the Apostles (1993) Word

republished in 2000 as The Gospel According to the Apostles
republished in 2005 by Thomas Nelson

- God: Coming Face to Face with His Majesty (1993) Victor
- Different By Design (1994) ChariotVictor Publishing
- Reckless Faith: When the Church Loses its Will to Discern (1994) Word
- The Vanishing Conscience (1994) Word

republished in 2005 by Thomas Nelson

- The Body Dynamic: Finding Where You Fit in Today's Church (1996) ChariotVictor Publishing
- The Glory of Heaven: The Truth About Heaven, Angels, and Eternal Life. (1996) Crossway
- The Love of God: He Will Do Whatever it Takes to Make Us Holy (1996) Word
- The Silent Shepherd: The Care, the Comfort, and the Correction of the Holy Spirit (1996) ChariotVictor Publishing
- Strength for Today (1997) Crossway
- The Power of Integrity: Building a Life Without Compromise (1997) Crossway
- In the Footsteps of Faith: Lessons to Learn From Great Men and Women of the Bible (1998) Crossway
- Our Sufficiency in Christ (1998) Crossway
- Successful Christian Parenting (1998) Word
- The Freedom and Power of Forgiveness (1998) Good News

republished in 2009 by Crossway ISBN 1-4335-1130-4

- The Only Way to Happiness (1998) Moody
- The Pillars of Christian Character: The Essential Attitudes of a Living Faith (1998) Crossway
- I Believe in Jesus: Leading Your Child to Christ (1999) Nelson
- Nothing but the Truth (1999) Crossway
- The Second Coming (1999, 2005) Crossway

=== 2000s ===
- Biblical Parenting for Life (Student's & Teacher's Manuals) (2000) Word (Out of Print)
- O Worship the King (book & CD) (2000) Crossway
- The Murder of Jesus (2000) Word

also Participant's Guide
revised in 2004 by Thomas Nelson

- Whose Money Is It, Anyway? (2000) Word (Out of Print)
- Why Government Can't Save You (2000) Word
- A Bright Tomorrow (2001) Crossway
- God in the Manger (2001) Word
- How to Survive in a World of Unbelievers (2001) Word (Out of Print)
- O Come All Ye Faithful (book & CD) (2001) Crossway
- Our Awesome God (2001) Crossway
- Terrorism, Jihad, and the Bible (2001) Word
- The Battle for the Beginning (2001) Word

republished in 2005 by Thomas Nelson

- The God Who Loves (2001) Word
- The Keys to Spiritual Growth (2001) Crossway
- Truth for Today (2001) J. Countryman (a division of Thomas Nelson)
- Can God Bless America? (2002) Word
- Twelve Ordinary Men (2002) Word
- What Wondrous Love Is This (book & CD) (2002) Crossway
- When Morning Guilds the Skies (book & CD) (2002) Crossway
- Why One Way (2002) Word
- Hard to Believe (2003) Thomas Nelson
- Lord, Teach Me to Pray (2003) J. Countryman (a division of Thomas Nelson)
- Safe in the Arms of God (2003) Thomas Nelson
- Think Biblically! (2003) Crossway
- Unleashing God's Word in Your Life (2003) Thomas Nelson
- Follow Me (2004) J. Countryman (a division of Thomas Nelson)
- The Book on Leadership (2004) Nelson
- Truth Matters (2004) Thomas Nelson
- The Gospel According to the Apostles (2005) Thomas Nelson ISBN 0-7852-7180-5
- The Heart of the Bible (2005) Nelson Reference & Electronic Publishing
- Twelve Extraordinary Women (2005) Moody
- Experiencing the Passion of Christ (Student Edition) (2006) Nelson Impact
- The Quest for Character (2006) Thomas Nelson ISBN 1-4041-0049-0
- Because the Time Is Near: John MacArthur Explains the Book of Revelation (2007) Moody ISBN 0-8024-0728-5
- The Extraordinary Mother: Blessings for You from Bible Moms (2007) J. Countryman ISBN 1-4041-0393-7
- The Truth War: Fighting for Certainty in an Age of Deception (2007) Nelson ISBN 0-7852-6263-6
- The God Who Loves: He Will Do Whatever It Takes to Draw Us to Him (2008) Thomas Nelson ISBN 1-4002-7794-9
- A Tale of Two Sons: The Inside Story of a Father, His Sons, and a Shocking Murder (2008) Thomas Nelson ISBN 0-7852-6268-7
- Right Thinking in a World Gone Wrong: A Biblical Response to Today's Most Controversial Issues (2009) Harvest House ISBN 0-7369-2643-7
- The Jesus You Can't Ignore: What You Must Learn from the Bold Confrontations of Christ (2009) Thomas Nelson ISBN 1-4002-0206-X

=== 2010s ===
- Ashamed of the Gospel: When the Church Becomes Like The World (3rd Edition [2010]), Crossway ISBN 1-4335-0929-6
- Slave: The Hidden Truth About Your Identity in Christ (2010), Thomas Nelson ISBN 1-4002-0207-8
- Truth Endures: Landmark Sermons From Forty Years of Unleashing God's Truth One Verse at a Time (2011), Crossway ISBN 1-4335-2450-3
- At The Throne of Grace: A Book of Prayers (2011), Harvest House ISBN 0-7369-3840-0
- The Truth About Grace (2012), Thomas Nelson ISBN 1-4002-0412-7
- Worship: The Ultimate Priority (2012), Moody Publishers ISBN 0802482988
- One Perfect Life: The Complete Story of Jesus (2013), Thomas Nelson ISBN 1401676324
- Strange Fire: The Danger of Offending the Holy Spirit with Counterfeit Worship (2013), Thomas Nelson
- Parables (2015), Thomas Nelson
- The Deity of Christ (2017), Moody Publishers ISBN 0-8024-1511-3
- The Gospel According to Paul (2017), Thomas Nelson ISBN 1-4002-0349-X
- None Other: Discovering the God of the Bible (2017), Ligonier Ministries ISBN 1-5676-9738-0
- Good News: The Gospel of Jesus Christ (2018), Reformation Trust Publishing ISBN 1-5676-9856-5
- The Gospel According to God (2018), Crossway ISBN 1-4335-4957-3
- Christ's Call to Reform the Church: Timeless Demands from the Lord to His People (2018) Moody Publishers ISBN 0-8024-1570-9
- Final Word: Why We Need the Bible (2019), Reformation Trust Publishing ISBN 1-6428-9126-6
- One Faithful Life: A Harmony of the Life and Writings of the Apostle Paul (2019) Thomas Nelson ISBN 0-7852-2926-4
- Stand Firm: Living in a Post-Christian Culture (2020), Reformation Trust Publishing ISBN 1-6428-9221-1

=== 2020s ===
- The War on Children: Providing Refuge for Your Children in a Hostile World (2024), The Master's Seminary Press ISBN 978-1883973049

== Juvenile ==
- A Faith to Grow On (2000, 2004) Thomas Nelson
- A Faith to Grow on Journal (2004) Thomas Nelson
- A Faith to Grow On Bible (2005) Thomas Nelson

== The Master's Seminary Journal articles ==
- "The Mandate of Biblical Inerrancy: Expository Preaching" - originally published under the title "Inerrancy and Preaching: Where Exposition and Exegesis Come Together" in Hermeneutics, Inerrancy, and the Bible
- "The Psychology Epidemic and Its Cure" - adapted from Our Sufficiency in Christ
- "Perseverance of the Saints" - adapted from Faith Works: The Gospel According to the Apostles (1993)
- "Mortification of Sin" - adapted from The Vanishing Conscience (1994)
- "Evangelicals and Catholics Together" - adapted from Reckless Faith: When the Church Loses Its Will to Discern (1995)
- "The Love of God for Humanity" - adapted from The Love of God (1996)
- "In Defense of Integrity" - adapted from The Power of Integrity (1997)
- "Visions of the Glorious Christ" (1999)
- "Is Christ's Return Imminent?" - adapted from The Second Coming (2000)
- "Open Theism's Attack on the Atonement" - subsequently published in Taming the Lion: The Openness of God and the Failure of Imagination (2001)
- "Creation: Believe It or Not (Genesis 1:1)" - previously published in The Battle for the Beginning: The Bible on Creation and the Fall of Adam (2002)
- "Does God Still Give Revelation?" - adapted from Charismatic Chaos (2003)
- "The Sufficiency of Scripture" - adapted from Our Sufficiency in Christ (2004)
- "A Challenge for Christian Communicators" (2006)
- "Perspicuity of Scripture: The Emergent Approach" (2006)
- "God’s Word on Homosexuality: The Truth About Sin and the Reality of Forgiveness" (2008)
