= MacArthur Study Bible =

1997 study bible edited by John F. MacArthur

The MacArthur Study Bible, first issued in 1997 by current HarperCollins brand W Publishing, is a study Bible edited by evangelical preacher John F. MacArthur with introductions and annotations to the 66 books of the Protestant Bible. It also includes charts, maps, study notes, Biblical harmonies, chronologies of Old Testament kings and prophets, and appendices. MacArthur, pastor of Grace Community Church and chancellor of The Master's Seminary, wrote more than half of the 20,000 entries himself in longhand, and reworked many of the others written by Seminary faculty.

Initially only available in the New King James Version, the MacArthur Study Bible is now also published using the New American Standard Bible, English Standard Version, Legacy Standard Bible (currently the official version, as the Legacy Standard Bible was produced in association with The Master's Seminary, which is part of the MacArthur Trust), and New International Version translations, as well as in Spanish, German, French, Italian, Portuguese and Kiswahili. In 1998, it won the Gold Medallion Book Award for Study Bible of the Year, and as of 2007 had more than one million copies distributed. It has also been criticized for its views on dispensationalist premillennialism in eschatology, and limited atonement.
