= The Master's Seminary =

Division of The Master's University

Coordinates: 34°13′14″N 118°25′17″W

- Motto: Omne Verbum Inspiratum, Omne Verbum Praedicatum
- Motto in English: Every Word Inspired, Every Word Preached
- Type: Theological seminary
- Established: 1986
- Accreditation: WSCUC
- Affiliations: The Master's University; Grace Community Church; WSCUC
- President: Abner Chou
- Faculty: 18
- Students: 598
- Location: Sun Valley, California, United States
- Campus: Urban (Los Angeles)
- Website: tms.edu

The Master's Seminary (TMS) is the graduate seminary division of The Master's University and Seminary and is located on the campus of Grace Community Church in Sun Valley, California. It is accredited by the WASC Senior College and University Commission (WSCUC).

== History ==
The Master's Seminary was founded in the fall of 1986 under the leadership of John F. MacArthur. In the early 1990s, the seminary experienced substantial growth. In March 1998, the seminary completed construction of its own facility on the church campus. The 32,000 square foot building houses the seminary administrative and faculty offices, library, studio facilities, and class and seminar rooms.

The Master's Seminary first received WASC accreditation in 1988. The seminary is organized around five degree programs: Master of Divinity (M.Div.), Master of Theology (Th.M.) (added in 1992), Doctor of Philosophy (Ph.D.) (added in 2000, originally as a Doctor of Theology), Doctor of Ministry (D.Min.) in Expository Preaching (added in 2004), and a Spanish-language Master of Biblical Ministry (added in 2017). The last four programs were added after a process of substantive change and subsequent WSCUC approval.

The Master's University (TMU) began as Los Angeles Baptist Theological Seminary in 1927. In 1959, the campus relocated to Newhall, California. In the 1950s, an undergraduate program was developed. During the process of acquiring accreditation from WASC in the early 1970s, it was decided that the original seminary would separate and relocate (becoming Northwest Baptist Seminary in Tacoma, Washington). The college remained and became Los Angeles Baptist College. After MacArthur became president of the college in 1985, the name of the school was changed to The Master's College. The central college campus remains in Newhall (now incorporated as the city of Santa Clarita, California), while TMS has been located on the church campus from its beginning. TMS operates a satellite campus in the Dallas-Fort Worth Metroplex at Countryside Bible Church in Southlake, Texas.

In June 2019, MacArthur retired from serving as the president and transitioned into the role of chancellor emeritus.

== Accreditation ==
The institution has been accredited by the Western Association of Schools and Colleges or one of its successor organizations, the WASC Senior College and University Commission (WSCUC), since 1975. In 2018, the WSCUC placed the university on probation after a site visit found it out of compliance with several accreditation standards, citing a lack of board independence, arbitrary personnel practices, conflicts of interest (including favorable treatment for MacArthur's relatives), and a "climate of fear, intimidation, bullying, and uncertainty" among faculty and staff. In November 2020, the probation was lifted, and full accreditation was reaffirmed.

== Doctrine ==
Theologically, The Master's Seminary is conservative and fundamentalist, affirming biblical inerrancy, a Reformed view of soteriology, and a dispensational, premillennial position in eschatology. They have a doctrinal statement, which covers the major aspects of their beliefs in a systematic fashion. The belief system is incorporated in the instructional tenets of their programs, emphasizing intense study of the Biblical languages in preparation for expository preaching. In 2017, the seminary faculty worked with John F. MacArthur and Richard L. Mayhue to produce a volume of systematic theology entitled Biblical Doctrine: A Systematic Summary of Bible Truth.

== The Master's Seminary Library ==
The seminary library began in 1986 with 7,000 volumes. The collection has been built into a major biblical and theological studies collection of over 350,000 volumes. The library collection is available online through the Voyager and Primo Systems of Ex Libris. The library provides access to a wide variety of research databases including ATLA, Thesaurus Linguae Graecae (TLG)], Early American Imprints, Ad Fontes Library of Classic Protestant Texts, and others. The Master's Seminary library was one of the founding libraries of the Southern California Theological Library Association (SCATLA).

== The Master's Seminary Journal ==
Begun in 1990, The Master's Seminary Journal (ISSN 1066-3959) is a publication of the faculty of The Master's Seminary. It is published semi-annually and contains articles dealing with the Biblical text, theology, and issues related to pastoral ministry. It also contains reviews of current books and significant articles relating to these issues. The Master's Seminary Journal (MSJ) is indexed and abstracted in leading research tools including: Elenchus Bibliographicus Biblicus of Biblica, Christian Periodical Index, Guide to Social Science & Religion in Periodical Literature, New Testament Abstracts, and Old Testament Abstracts. It is also indexed in the ATLA (American Theological Library Association) Religion Database and it is included in the full-text ATLASerials.

== The Legacy Standard Bible ==
The Master's Seminary provided notable contribution to the creation of the Legacy Standard Bible (LSB). The LSB arose to preserve the NASB 1995 translation and provide "greater consistency in word usage, accuracy in grammatical structure, and tightening phrasing." The creation of the LSB was a collaboration by Lockman Foundation, Three Sixteen Publishing, and the John MacArthur Charitable Trust. The translators for the LSB "consists of a group of biblically qualified, faithful men from the Master’s University and Seminary, all of whom are scholars and preachers." This translation contains two notable distinctions: the use of the Tetragrammaton rather than LORD and "slave" for the Greek word doulos.

== Notable alumni ==
- Francis Chan, founder of the evangelical megachurch Cornerstone Community Church in Simi Valley, California
- Scott Seely, bishop suffragan of the Anglican Diocese of All Nations

== Notable faculty ==
- F. David Farnell
- John F. MacArthur
- William Varner

== Related ministries ==
- The Master's University
- Grace Community Church
