= F. David Farnell =

- Born: 1958 (age 67–68)
- Occupations: New Testament scholar and professor

Academic background
- Education: Dallas Theological Seminary
- Thesis: The New Testament Prophetic Gift: its nature and duration (1990)

Academic work
- Era: Late 20th and Early 21st Centuries

F. David Farnell (born 1958) is an American New Testament scholar, Christian minister, and is the new pastor of theological training at Redeemer Bible Church in Phoenix, Arizona. He was formerly professor of New Testament studies at The Master's Seminary. He promotes a conservative approach to New Testament studies. Farnell's works include the book The Jesus Crisis: The Inroads of historical Criticism into Evangelical Scholarship and The Jesus Quest: The Danger from Within. His writings on biblical inerrancy have been endorsed by John F. MacArthur, Albert Mohler, and Paige Patterson. He is also the pastor of Grace Bible Church in Oxnard, California.

He is a contributor and editor for the blog Defending Inerrancy, as well as "Historical" Jesus Search Report, where he writes on his views of the inerrancy and infallibility of the Bible. He is also the host of The Danger Zone on World View Weekend Radio Network.

During the 2014 National Apologetics Conference, Farnell addressed the current state in New Testament scholarship. In his lecture, The Battle for the Bible: Responding to the New Attacks on Scripture, he criticized the New Testament scholars Robert H. Gundry, Michael Bird, Craig Blomberg, as well as the apologist William Lane Craig. He has criticized Michael Licona for identifying the canonical gospels with the classical genre of Greco-Roman biography, instead of following Eusebius and Clement in recognizing them as modeled after or fulfilling ancient Hebrew oracles and as eschewing Greek philosophy and historiography. Licona has criticized Farnell for this view and for other conservative views.

Farnell supports the historical-grammatical method in New Testament studies, and specializes in the impact of historical-critical philosophical ideologies in Biblical Criticism and interpretation of the New Testament. He opposes what he regards as a liberal approach to the study of the Bible, and promotes the Protestant doctrine of biblical inerrancy.

== Education ==
Farnell attended San Diego Christian College (formerly Christian Heritage College), where he received a BA in Biblical studies. He graduated with an M.Div. from Talbot School of Theology in 1981. That same year he was awarded the Systematic Theology Award and the Biola University/President's Rotary-Club Award for Academic Achievement. He studied a Th.M. with an emphasis in New Testament under the New Testament scholar Robert Thomas. In 1984 he graduated from the Th.M. program.

He received a Ph.D. from Dallas Theological Seminary, where he studied under New Testament scholar Darrell Bock, and alongside the Greek scholar Daniel B. Wallace.

== Career ==
While completing his master's degree, Farnell served as a teaching assistant in New Testament and Bible exposition at Talbot School of Theology. After his Ph.D. studies he was offered the chair of the Department of Pastoral Theology and Biblical Studies at Southeastern Bible College. Later he became the academic dean of the same institution from 1994 - 1997.

In 1997 he came to The Master's Seminary as associate professor of New Testament. During this time he worked with Robert Thomas to develop the New Testament Department of The Master's Seminary. He was named professor of New Testament in 2007. Since 2008, Farnell is also adjunct professor at Veritas Evangelical Seminary.

In March 2017, Farnell was invited as keynote speaker to the Chafer Theological Seminary Pastor's Conference (Dean Bible Conference). During his appearance, he spoke on "Critical Issues in Inerrancy" by means of four ground breaking sessions: Current Challenges to Orthodox Inerrancy: Dancing on the Edge (part 1, part 2, part 3), and Evangelical Critical Scholarship and the Canonical Gospels: What Hath Spinoza Wrought? Other keynote speakers included H. Wayne House and Andy Woods.

In June 2021, Farnell left The Master's Seminary to form a new pastoral training center in Phoenix, Arizona, under the auspices of Redeemer Bible Church (Redeemeraz.org)

== Works ==
=== Thesis ===
- Farnell, F. David (1990). The New Testament Prophetic Gift: its nature and duration (Th.D.). Dallas, TX: Dallas Theological Seminary. OCLC 22211126.

=== Books ===
- Farnell, F. David (1998). The Jesus Crisis: The Inroads of historical Criticism into Evangelical Scholarship. Grand Rapids, MI: Kregel. ISBN 9780825438110. OCLC 38425871.
- ———; Andrews, Edward D.; Howe, Thomas; Marshall, Thomas; Newman, Dianna; Cocar, Benjamin (2016). Basics of Biblical Criticism: Helpful or Harmful?. Cambridge, OH: Christian Publishing House. ISBN 9780692319857.

=== As editor ===
- ———; Geisler, Norman L., eds. (2013). The Jesus Quest, The Danger from Within. Maitland, FL: Xulon Press. ISBN 9781628394658. OCLC 873944368.
- ———; Geisler, Norman L.; Holden, Joseph M., eds. (2016). Vital Issues in the Inerrancy Debate. Eugene, OR: Wipf and Stock. ISBN 9781498237246. OCLC 957436377.

=== Articles and chapters ===
- ——— (1994). "When Will the Gift of Prophecy Cease?". In Zuck, Roy B. (ed.). Vital Contemporary Issues. Vol. 2. Grand Rapids, MI: Kregel.
- ——— (Spring 1999). "The Synoptic Gospels in the Ancient Church: A Testimony to the Priority of Matthew's Gospel". The Master's Seminary Journal. 10: 53–86.
- ——— (Spring 2002). "The Impact of Views of Inspiration on Modern Approaches to the Synoptic Problem". The Master's Seminary Journal. 13 (1): 33–64.
- ——— (Spring 2005). "Introduction, History and Presuppositions of the New Perspective on Paul". The Master's Seminary Journal. 17 (2).
- ——— (2010). "Searching for the Historical Jesus: Does History Repeat Itself". Journal of the International Society of Christian Apologetics. 3 (1): 83–107.
- ——— (April 2013). "A Critical Review of Donald Hagner's 'Ten Guidelines for Evangelical Scholarship". Journal for the International Society of Christian Apologetics. 6 (1): 179–206.
- ——— (Spring 2013). "Three Searches for the 'Historical Jesus' But No Biblical Christ (Part 2): Evangelicals Participation in the Search for the 'Historical Jesus". The Master's Seminary Journal. 24 (1): 25–67.
- ——— (Spring 2012). "Three Searches for the 'Historical Jesus' but No Biblical Christ (Part 1): The Rise of the Searches". The Master's Seminary Journal. 23 (1): 7–42.
