= William Varner =

American biblical scholar

William C. Varner is an American biblical scholar. He is Professor of Biblical Studies & Greek at The Master's University.

== Biography ==
Varner studied at Bob Jones University, B.A.; Dropsie College, M.A.;Biblical Theological Seminary, M.Div; Th.M.; and Temple University, Ed.D. .

He and his wife, Helen, have had three children and four grandchildren. He grew up in South Carolina in a non-Christian home and became a Christian at the age of 17. He attended Bob Jones University and then graduated from the Biblical Theological Seminary in 1972. Will was a pastor in Pennsylvania for seven years, and during that time earned another masters degree in New Testament and had his first trip to Israel. He then served for seventeen years with The Friends of Israel Gospel Ministry in New Jersey while earning a third masters degree in Jewish Studies at Dropsie College and then a doctorate at Temple University in Philadelphia.

In 1996, Varner took a position at The Master’s University, where he teaches Bible exposition courses and Greek Exegesis. He was also the Director of IBEX, the college’s overseas campus in Israel, for over twenty years, and has led 51 study trips to the land of Israel. He pastored the Sojourners Fellowship at Grace Community Church for twenty-three years. Currently he teaches the Bereans Class at Grace Baptist Church. Varner is the author of two dozen books, both for laymen and scholars, and dozens of journal articles. His most significant scholarly efforts are a 450-page commentary on James, published by Fontes Press, and a new translation and introduction to the Apostolic Fathers, published by T&T Clark.

Varner was a recipient of a Festschrift published in his honor in 2021, titled Written for Our Instruction: Essays in Honor of William Varner and published by Fontes Press.

Varner and his pastor, David Hegg, collaborated on a Life of the Messiah with Matthew as the primary source, illustrated with images by Todd Bolen. It was published in the Fall of 2025.

== Books ==
1. The Chariot of Israel: Exploits of the Prophet Elijah, 1984.

2. Jacob's Dozen: The Tribes of Israel in History and Prophecy, 1987.

3. How Jewish is Christianity?, Zondervan, 2003.

4. The Messiah: Revealed, Rejected, Received, AuthorHouse, 2004. op:2026.

5. Three Ancient Jewish-Christian Dialogues: Athanasius and Zacchaeus, et.al., Mellen Press, 2005.

6. The Way of the Didache: The First Christian Handbook, University Press of America, 2007.

7. A Discourse Analysis of the Letter of James, 2011, 2017.

8. Awake O Harp: Devotional Commentary on Psalms, 2012, 2017.

9. James: A Devotional Commentary, Kindle Publishing, 2017.

10. James: A Commentary on the Greek Text, Fontes Press, 2017.

11. Philippians: An Exegetical Commentary, Fontes Press, 2021.

12. To Preach or Not to Preach: Women’s Ministry Then and Now, Kindle Publishing, 2018.

13. Commentary on 2 Clement, Wipf and Stock, 2020

14. Passionate About the Passion Week, Fontes Press, 2020.

15. Anticipating the Advent, Fontes Press, 2020

16. Messiah’s Ministry, Fontes Press, 2021

17. Big Greek Idea Commentary on James, Kregel 2022

18. The Legacy Standard Bible, Translator, 316 Publishers, 2022.

19. Handbook on Praying Scripture from the Legacy Standard Bible, 316 Publishers, 2023. Leather edition, 2024.

20. The Preacher and the Song: Ecclesiastes and Song of Songs, Fontes Press, 2023

21. The Apostolic Fathers: An Introduction and Translation, T&T Clark, 2023.

22. Matthew's Messiah: His Jewish Life and Ministry, Fontes Press, 2025.

23. Introducing the Apostolic Fathers, Lumena Press, 2025.

24. Jesus the Jewish Messiah: Foretold and Fulfilled, 316 Press, 2026.

== Articles, Chapters, Videos ==
1. “Baptism in Various Theological Traditions,” Baptist Reformation Review, 1975.

2. Around one hundred articles in Israel My Glory, 1979–2003.

3. “The Magi and the Star,” Voice Magazine, 1991.

4. “The Influence of Cabala on Christian Hermeneutics,” The Master’s Seminary Journal, 1997.

5. “Do We Need Messianic Jewish Synagogues?” The Master’s Seminary Journal, 2003.

6. “The Didache’s Use of the Old and New Testaments,” The Master’s Seminary Journal, 2005.

7. “What the Teaching Can Teach Us,” Christianity Today, June, 2006.

8. “A Discourse Analysis of Matthew’s Nativity Narrative,” Tyndale Bulletin, 58.2, 2007.

9. “In the Wake of Trypho: Jewish-Christian Dialogues in Early Centuries,” Evangelical Quarterly, July, 2008.

10. “The Didache Apocalypse and Matthew 24,” Bibliotheca Sacra, 2008.

11. “Theme and Structure of James” in The Masters Seminary Journal, 2010.

12. “The Didache as a Christian Enchiridion” in Christian Origins in Greco-Roman Culture, Brill, 2012.

13. “On the Trail of Trypho: Two Ancient Jewish-Christian Dialogues” in Christian Origins and Hellenistic Judaism, Brill, 2012.

14. “A Majority Text Reading in James 3:3” Journal of Graeco-Roman Christianity and Judaism.

15. A couple dozen book reviews in various journals and periodicals (1996–2023).

16. Around a dozen additional articles in popular Christian magazines (1976–2024).

17. “From Baur to Bauer and Beyond: Early Jewish Christianity” (chapter in book, Wipf and Stock, 2014)

18. “Who is Resisting in James 5:6?” Chapter in Festschrift for David Black, 2018

19. “The Seed and Schaeffer” chapter in What Happened in the Garden?, Kregel, 2016.

20. “Does James Have a Theology?” Dialogismos, 2018.

21. Chapter on “Noah’s Sons” in Moody Handbook of Messianic Prophecy, 2019.

22. “Thinking Biblically About James,” Master's University, 2020 (videos)

23. “Philippians” in Daily Greek Devotional: 365 Devotions, Jared August, ed., 2023.

24. “Passion Week Devotionals,” Focus on the Family, April, 2023.

25. “Praying Scripture When It Hurts,” Focus on the Family, May 2023.

26. "Don't Lecture. Preach!" Focus on the Family, July 2023.

27. “Can Papyri Help Us Understand Paul’s ‘Large Letters’ in Galatians?” in Paratextual Features of Early NT Manuscripts. Brill, 2023.

28. “Was James the First Pope?” Southern Baptist Journal of Theology, Fall 2023.

29. “Apostolic Fathers” in Oxford Bibliographies. With Clayton N. Jefford, New York: Oxford University Press, 2023.

30. "The Land of the Bible" Videos, Center for Thinking Biblically, The Master's University, 2023.

31. "Messiah and Josephus" Ariel Magazine, Fall 2022 / Volume 1 / #44, pp 22-26.

32. “Fragments of Papias” chapter in Apostolic Fathers book, Zondervan, 2025.

33. "Philo" chapter in Ancient Literature and the NT, Wipf & Stock, forthcoming.

34. Introduction to AT Robertson’s Commentary on James, Fontes, forthcoming.

35. Wonderful Things From Your Law. Devotions from LSB, Masters Seminary Press, 2025.

36. "Early History of Jewish Christianity" Oxford Research Encyclopedia of Religion, OUP, 2026.

37. "The Suffering Servant in Rabbinic Tradition" Ariel Magazine, Fall 2026: 30-33.
