= Forgotten God =

- Author: Francis Chan
- Language: English
- Genre: Christian literature
- Publisher: David C. Cook
- Publication date: 2009
- Publication place: United States
- Pages: 186
- ISBN: 978-1-4347-6795-0

Forgotten God: Reversing Our Tragic Neglect of the Holy Spirit, is a 2009 Christian book written by Francis Chan, the author of bestseller book Crazy Love. It is the second book written by Chan, and is co-authored with Danae Yankoski. This book was published by David C. Cook and was released in the United States in September 2009.

== Content ==
The book is divided up into seven chapters, containing a foreword and an afterword, all intended to help deepen readers' understanding of the Holy Spirit. The seven chapters are as follows:

- Chapter 1: I’ve Got Jesus. Why Do I Need the Spirit?
- Chapter 2: What Are You Afraid Of?
- Chapter 3: Theology of the Holy Spirit 101
- Chapter 4: Why Do You Want Him?
- Chapter 5: A Real Relationship
- Chapter 6: Forget About His Will for Your Life!
- Chapter 7: Supernatural Church

The book also contains an introduction, acknowledgements, a section about the cover, notes, and an excerpt from his previous book, Crazy Love: Overwhelmed by a Relentless God and both books can be downloaded in audiobook form.

== About the Book ==
Forgotten God is not a book that bashes the Christian Church, but states that problems with the Church are obvious. However, the solution, which is the Holy Spirit, is just as obvious. In the book of Acts the Holy Spirit is moving and active, and the people watching were in awe, and when people often talk about churches and people they're usually addressed as good, not as powerful.

A follow-up to the message of Crazy Love, Francis Chan offers an invitation to understand, embrace, and follow the Holy Spirit’s guidance in our lives. We sometimes pray to the Father, the Son, and the Holy Spirit, but we often live in awareness of only the first two.

Chan focuses on the character of the Holy Spirit and how He is missing in church. When the Holy Spirit is active, we produce the fruit of the spirit (which is love, joy, peace, patience, kindness, gentleness, and self-control) and that all of these attributes would come out in a supernatural sort of way, concerning our character. There should be a noticeable difference between us and the unbelievers around us when the Holy Spirit is present. Chan talks about how people that attempt to seek out a “balance” as a way of not wanting to have to give ourselves one hundred percent to something, and how in scripture people are supposed to seek the kingdom first. Chan seeks to pursue the Holy Spirit in a biblical way, growing up in a church, in which there wasn't much talk about the Holy Spirit. In response to his first book, Crazy Love, Chan wrote his second book because living out radical lives is impossible without the Holy Spirit. Chan looks to seek out the most obvious interpretations of scripture.

== Reception ==
Publishers Weekly reviewed Forgotten God saying that Francis Chan "passionately pleads with the church to live by the power of the Holy Spirit," but that it lacks depth in most Bible references. Chan has given all royalties from Crazy Love to help children trapped in sex trafficking.
