= John McArthur =

John McArthur may refer to:

- John McArthur (footballer) (born 1938), Australian rules player
- John McArthur (general) (1826–1906), Union general during the American Civil War
- John McArthur (Royal Navy officer) (1755–1840), British naval officer and author
- John McArthur (rugby league) (born 1964), Australian rugby league footballer
- John McArthur Jr. (1823–1890), American architect
- J. D. McArthur (John Duncan McArthur, 1854–1927), Canadian industrialist and railway builder
- John G. McArthur, New Zealand diplomat, see list of ambassadors of New Zealand
- John A. McArthur, New Zealand diplomat and eldest son of John G. McArthur, see list of ambassadors of New Zealand
- John H. McArthur (1934–2019), Dean Emeritus, Harvard Business School
- John Peter McArthur (1862–1942), Canadian politician from Alberta
- Frederick John McArthur, Canadian politician from Ontario

== See also ==
- John MacArthur (disambiguation)
