= You and Me Forever (book) =

- Author: Francis Chan & Lisa Chan
- Language: English
- Genre: Christian literature
- Publisher: Claire Love Publishing
- Publication date: August 26, 2014
- Publication place: United States
- Pages: 192
- ISBN: 0990351408

You and Me Forever: Marriage In Light of Eternity is a 2015 New York Times bestselling Christian book written by Francis Chan and Lisa Chan and published by Claire Love Publishing.

== Summary ==
You and Me Forever tells of the authors' view on how to have a successful marriage with an eternal focus. The overall theme of the book is that the best way to have a great marriage is by not focusing on marriage, but rather, focusing on God. The authors discuss lessons learned in their own marriage and urge their readers to seek Bible scriptures and the voice of God as their source of relational advice.
