= John MacArthur =

John MacArthur or Macarthur may refer to:

- J. Roderick MacArthur (1920–1984), American businessman
- John MacArthur (American pastor) (1939–2025), American evangelical minister, televangelist, and author
- John Macarthur (priest), 20th-century provost of the Cathedral of the Isles in Scotland
- John Macarthur (colonial officer) (1767–1834), Australian wool industry pioneer and Rum Rebel
- John D. MacArthur (1897–1978), American philanthropist
- John Gordon MacArthur, fictional murder victim from Agatha Christie's And Then There Were None
- John Knox MacArthur (1891–1918), American World War I flying ace
- John R. MacArthur (born 1956), American journalist
- John P. Macarthur (born 1958), Australian academic and architectural historian, Professor of Architecture at University of Queensland
- John Stewart MacArthur (1856–1920), Scottish inventor of the MacArthur-Forrest process for gold cyanidation (1887)
- John MacArthur (rugby union), Scottish international rugby union player

== See also ==
- John McArthur (disambiguation)
