= Francis Chan =

American writer and Christian preacher (born 1967)

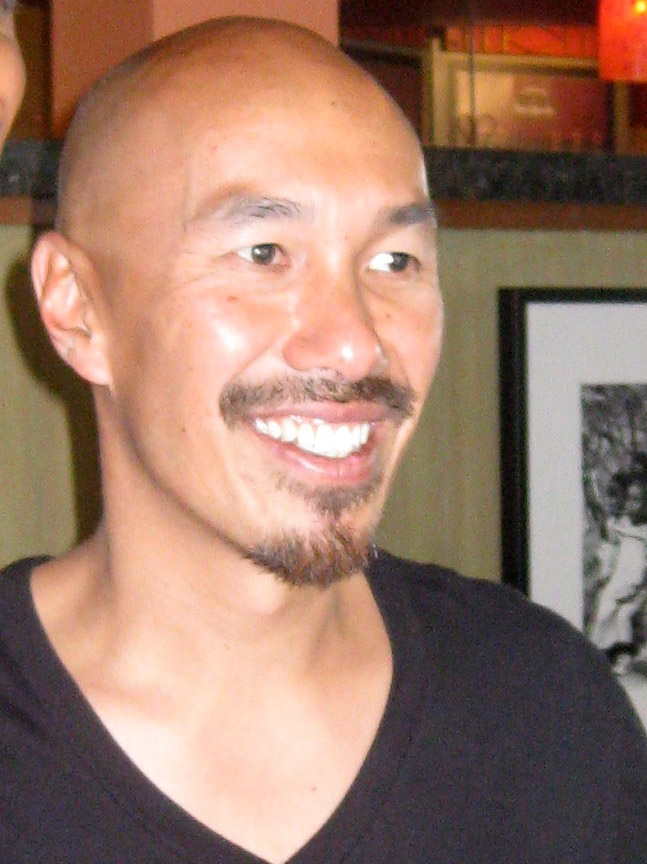
- Chan in 2009

Personal details
- Born: August 31, 1967 (age 59) San Francisco, California, U.S.
- Spouse: Lisa Lundgren
- Children: 7
- Occupation: Christian teacher, preacher, author
- Education: The Master's University (BA), The Master's Seminary (MDiv)

Francis Chan (Chinese: 陳恩藩; born August 31, 1967) is an American author, teacher, and preacher. He is the former teaching pastor of the nondenominational Cornerstone Community Church, an Evangelical church in Simi Valley, California founded by Chan in 1994. He also founded Eternity Bible College in 2004, and served as its early chancellor until 2010.

Chan has been a board member of several Christian and social justice organizations, including Children's Hunger Fund and Gospel for Asia. He has authored and co-authored numerous books including Crazy Love, a New York Times bestseller. Chan has also served as an ambassador for Care for Children.

== Biography ==
=== Early life and education ===
Chan was born in San Francisco to immigrants Pak-sum Chan [陳柏森], a former minister at the Leighton Road Baptist Church in Hong Kong, and Wan-bing Mui [梅韻冰], a “Bible woman of the Hong Kong Baptist Church, Caine Road.” He was their third child; his mother died during his childbirth, of “excessive bleeding”, leaving his father with sister Grace, brother Paul, and newborn Francis, who was named for the city of his birth and of the tragedy.

Chan was sent to Hong Kong to be raised by a grandmother, a Buddhist for several years. During this time, his father married Amy Law (羅笑容) and gave Francis a half-sister, Gloria. In 1976, when Chan was eight years old, his stepmother Amy Chan died in an automobile accident.

His father then remarried again, to Josephine Leung [梁克閱], who raised the four children. In raising the four, his father and new stepmother had family support from his father's younger sister and her husband, Marion and William Wong, along with a large extended family and church family. He did not get along well with his father growing up but says that his fear of his father has helped him understand a level of fear of God. He also stated he didn't understand the love of God well until he became a father himself. In 1979, when Francis was twelve years old, he lost his father to cancer. As a high-school and then junior-college student, Chan was active in Christian youth groups, which helped develop his faith in Christ and his interest in ministry.

Chan graduated from high school and went on to earn a Bachelor of Arts degree from Master's College, and a master of divinity degree from The Master's Seminary.

=== Career ===
After earning his seminary degree, Chan "landed a youth pastor position" in Chatsworth, California, at the Church at Rocky Peak. Christianity Today, reporting in 2009, has Chan characterizing this as a period where his personal life was not lived consistently with his religious ideals, stating "Those were the worst years of my life... a sinful, hypocritical time." For reasons not explained further, Chan left that pastoral position for a job at a restaurant, waiting tables.

==== Cornerstone Community Church ====
Chan, his wife Lisa, and 30 others founded Cornerstone Community Church in 1994; within two months, the church had grown to have 100 attending. The church continued to see increases in attendance, and by the year 2000, it had received approval from local officials for building expansion to double its capacity, in support of a 1,600-member congregation. As of January 2008, Cornerstone was one of the largest churches in Ventura County, California.

After a three-month leave from Cornerstone, circa 2008, Chan said he felt convicted to sacrifice more for God. Chan had been giving away about 50% of his income, didn't take a salary from his church, and donated most of his book royalties, which totaled about $2,000,000, to various charities. All of it goes to organizations which rescue sex slaves in foreign countries. Furthermore, in 2008 it was reported that Cornerstone would give away 55% of its income to charitable causes.

Chan started Eternity Bible College in 2004 as a ministry of Cornerstone Community Church, with 100 students. In 2008, Eternity launched an abroad program in Ecuador. As of 2009, the college had 47 graduates serving in various parts of the world.

On Sunday, April 18, 2010, Chan announced to his congregation that he felt called to resign.

==== Return to San Francisco ====
In June 2011, he stated he felt called to San Francisco. He moved to Northern California and started a church planting network of house churches called "We Are Church".

In September 2014, Chan joined the board of elders of Abundant Life Christian Fellowship; as of August 2016, he was no longer an elder at that congregation.

He served as a top-level leader in the We Are Church network until 2020.

==== Return to Hong Kong ====
In 2020, Chan moved back to Hong Kong, living and working in Sham Shui Po, the poorest area in Hong Kong and the neighborhood where his mother used to do ministry in the 1950s.

==== Return to the US ====
In January 2021, Chan announced he and his family had returned to the US after his HK visa was denied. He has stated his intent to return to Hong Kong when possible.

== Theology ==
Chan frequently talks about "What the Bible is really saying" "and really living our lives that way." According to one author, he is not afraid of confronting "lukewarmness" in the Christian life.

With regard to Communion, in January 2020, Francis Chan began to publicly investigate his stance on the real presence of Christ in the Lord's Supper, a lighter view of which is taught in the Reformed Protestant tradition (with which Chan has been associated in the past).

=== Ecumenism ===
Prior to this shift on the Eucharist, Chan had given a talk at the (Neo-charismatic Protestant) Onething conference in 2018, and was prayed over by multiple Catholic priests. He spoke at the Fellowship of Catholic University Students' SEEK conference in February 2021.

== Personal life ==
Chan is married to Lisa, a singer. They wed in 1994, and as of December 2014 they have seven children. Their eldest is singer Rachel Chan.

== Bibliography ==
- Chan, Francis; Danae Yankoski (2008). Crazy Love: Overwhelmed by a Relentless God. David C. Cook. ISBN 978-1-4347-6851-3.
- Chan, Francis; Danae Yankoski (2009). Forgotten God: Reversing Our Tragic Neglect of the Holy Spirit. David C. Cook. ISBN 978-1-4347-6795-0.
- Chan, Francis; Matt Daniels (2010). Halfway Herbert. David C. Cook. ISBN 978-0-7814-0418-1.
- Chan, Francis; Matt Daniels (2010). The Big Red Tractor and the Little Village. David C. Cook. ISBN 978-0-7814-0419-8.
- Chan, Francis; Preston Sprinkle (2011). Erasing Hell: What God said about eternity, and the things we made up. David C. Cook. ISBN 978-0-7814-0725-0.
- Chan, Francis; Mark Beuving (2012). Multiply. David C. Cook. ISBN 978-0-7814-0823-3
- Chan, Francis; Bill Hybels; Eugene Peterson (2014). The Road We Must Travel. Worthy Publishing. ISBN 978-1-61795-291-3.
- Chan, Francis; Lisa Chan (2014). You and Me Forever: Marriage in the Light of Eternity. Claire Love Publishing. ISBN 978-0-9903514-0-5.
- Chan, Francis (2018). Letters to the Church. David C. Cook. ISBN 978-0-83077-658-0.
- Chan, Francis (2021). Until Unity. David C. Cook. ISBN 978-0-8307-8272-7.
- Chan, Francis (2025). Beloved (David Cook)
