= Legacy Standard Bible =

English translation of the Bible

- Abbreviation: LSB
- NT published: February 2021
- Complete Bible published: November 2021
- Derived from: New American Standard Bible (1995 text ed.)
- Textual basis: OT: Biblia Hebraica Stuttgartensia; additional sources; NT: Novum Testamentum Graece (27th ed., 1993; 28th ed., 2012)
- Translation type: Formal equivalence
- Reading level: 10.0
- Publisher: Three Sixteen Publishing; Lockman Foundation
- Copyright: Legacy Standard Bible; Copyright © 2021 by The Lockman Foundation; A Corporation Not for Profit; La Habra, California; All Rights Reserved www.lockman.org
- Website: www.lsbible.org
- Genesis 1:1–3 In the beginning God created the heavens and the earth. And the earth was formless and void, and darkness was over the surface of the deep, and the Spirit of God was hovering over the surface of the waters. Then God said, "Let there be light"; and there was light. John 3:16 "For God so loved the world, that He gave His only begotten Son, that whoever believes in Him shall not perish, but have eternal life.

The Legacy Standard Bible (LSB) is a translation of the Bible in contemporary English. Published in 2021 by Three Sixteen Publishing (in partnership with the Lockman Foundation), the LSB was created as a revision of the 1995 text edition of the New American Standard Bible. The LSB relies on recently published critical editions of the original Hebrew, Aramaic, and Greek texts.

Having been sponsored by the John MacArthur Charitable Trust, the LSB was developed by a team of various faculty from The Master's Seminary.

== Translation philosophy ==
The LSB is a direct update of the NASB 1995 edition that "honors and upholds the NASB tradition, and endeavors to more fully implement its translation philosophy." The translators of the LSB used the original Hebrew, Aramaic, and Greek sources to review every verse in the translation for accuracy. Any changes made in the LSB from the NASB 1995 were made for "greater consistency in word usage, accuracy in grammatical structure, and tightening phrasing."

The Hebrew text used for this translation was the Biblia Hebraica Stuttgartensia together with the most recent insights from lexicography, cognate languages, and the Dead Sea Scrolls. For Greek, the 27th edition of Eberhard Nestle's Novum Testamentum Graece, supplemented by the 28th edition in the General Epistles, was used as the base text while consulting the Society of Biblical Literature GNT as well as the Tyndale House GNT on variant texts. The greatest strength of the NASB was its reliability and fidelity to the original languages, and the LSB seeks to be an improvement upon it "while simultaneously preserving its faithful legacy."

=== YHWH ===
One significant departure from the NASB 1995 is the rendering of the tetragrammaton YHWH (rendered as "Jehovah" in the original American Standard Version). The NASB rendered it as "LORD" or "GOD" in all capitals, but the LSB renders it as "Yahweh" or "Yah" depending on the original, underlying Hebrew usage. The stated reason for this change was as follows:

In the LSB, God's covenant name is rendered as Yahweh, as opposed to LORD. The meaning and implication of this name is God's self-deriving, ongoing, and never-ending existence. Exodus 3:14–15 shows that God Himself considered it important for His people to know His name. The effect of revealing God's name is His distinction from other gods and His expression of intimacy with the nation of Israel. Such a dynamic is a prevalent characteristic of the Scriptures as Yahweh appears in the OT over 6,800 times. In addition to Yahweh, the full name of God, the OT also includes references to God by a shorter version of His name, Yah. By itself, God's name "Yah" may not be as familiar, but the appearance of it is recognizable in Hebrew names and words (e.g. Zechar-iah, meaning Yah remembers, and Hallelu-jah, meaning praise Yah!). God's shortened name "Yah" is predominantly found in poetry and praise.

=== Doulos ===
Another significant translation in the LSB is the Greek word doulos, which the LSB always renders as "slave". This is opposed to many other modern English Bible translations that render it as "servant". The LSB translators defended this decision for consistency as follows:

The NT has a variety of terms that refer to the individuals who serve under the authority of another. Doulos denotes a very specific form of servitude: slavery. The NT uses doulos to describe an individual who is totally subordinate to a master (cf. Matt 8:9; 24:46; 2 Pet 2:19) and even owned by that master (Philem 16-19), in contrast to one who is freed (Gal 3:28). For this reason, the NASB already translated the vast majority of this term as slave. The LSB made this consistent, which brings out how believers are to relate to Christ. He is our Lord and master (2 Cor 4:5), and we are His slaves (Rom 1:1; Phil 1:1). This underscores His great redemption in buying believers from slavery to sin (Rom 6:16). This also underscores the believer's absolute surrender to the Lord Jesus Christ (Rom 6:16-17). A consistent translation of doulos, in effect, sharpens the very nature of the Christian life.

=== Pronouns referring to God ===
One of the distinctive features of the NASB was that all pronouns referring to God were capitalized. The LSB has preserved this decision to capitalize all pronouns referring to God and, by extension, Jesus Christ and the Holy Spirit. For example, in John 3:16, the LSB says, "For God so loved the world, that He [God] gave His only begotten Son, that whoever believes in Him [God's Son, Jesus] shall not perish, but have eternal life" (emphasis added). The LSB translators explained the benefits of this decision, stating that "Capitalization aids in two main ways. First, it is a way to show honor to God who is greater than man. Second, it helps the reader track with the author, making clear exactly to whom the pronoun refers."

== Translators ==
The translation work was done by a group of scholars from The Master's Seminary and was sponsored by the John MacArthur Charitable Trust in partnership with the Lockman Foundation. The LSB website states that it "also went through an extensive review process from a team that consists of scholars and pastors from all around the world" and "was reviewed by a team of 70+ scholars, pastors, and every-day NASB readers... [to ensure] readers from all walks of life can easily engage and interact with the text."
