= Eternity Bible College =

Private Bible college in Simi Valley, California

Coordinates: 34.27444°N 118.71071°W

- Type: Private Bible college
- Established: 2004
- Location: Simi Valley, California and Boise, Idaho, United States
- Website: eternity.edu

Eternity Bible College (EBC) is a private Bible college in Simi Valley, California. It was founded by Francis Chan, former pastor of Cornerstone Community Church. The college is accredited by the Association for Biblical Higher Education.

== History ==
EBC was founded by Francis Chan as a ministry of Cornerstone Community Church. In 2001, Cornerstone launched a Bible Institute to better equip its members for ministry. In 2003, they resolved to turn this into a college. Over the course of the next year, Cornerstone gathered personnel and resources, and launched the college in 2004 with a class of 100 students.

The faculty consists of pastors serving in local churches in the greater Los Angeles area.

The college offers a Bachelor of Biblical Studies and a Certificate of Biblical Studies. The emphasis of these programs is on studying the Bible for the purpose of applying biblical principles to all areas of life and ministry.
