= Crazy Love: Overwhelmed by a Relentless God =

Book by American author Francis Chan

Crazy Love
- Author: Francis Chan
- Language: English
- Genre: Christian literature
- Publisher: David C. Cook
- Publication date: 2008
- Publication place: United States
- Pages: 186
- ISBN: 978-1-4347-6851-3
- OCLC: 226964509
- Dewey Decimal: 248.4 22
- LC Class: BV4501.3 .C434 2008

Crazy Love: Overwhelmed by a Relentless God is a 2008 New York Times bestselling Christian book written by Francis Chan and published by David C Cook. It is co-authored by Danae Yankoski with a foreword by Chris Tomlin. The book inspired the titular song for the album Crazy Love by Hawk Nelson and in 2009, won the Retailers Choice Award for the best Christian Living book.

== Summary ==
Crazy Love deals with the idea of the average Christian's love of God and learning how to further develop those feelings into a "crazy, relentless, all-powerful love." In the format of Crazy Love Chan dedicates three sections to renewing understanding around the character of God and seven chapters encourage Christians to examine themselves. Within the book are two ongoing themes: examine yourself and, controversial to Christian secular culture, live your best life later.

=== Section 1 ===
In the first section, Chan addresses the problem. He reviews God's character from the Bible and challenges the understanding of who God is.

=== Section 2 ===
Chan challenges Christians to examine themselves, through the idea of "luke-warm Christianity." Chan states, "A lukewarm Christian is an oxymoron; there’s no such thing. To put it plainly, churchgoers who are lukewarm are not Christians. We will not see them in heaven."

=== Section 3 ===
Chan then transitions to challenging Christians to live counter-culturally. Having a different view of the world through the eyes of "Living your best life...later." Chan claims that Christianity as described in the Bible reflects an obsessed behavior to become better neighbors, community members, servants, friends, and families by choosing to be humble, dedicated, and ending with loving everyone "as you have been loved."

== Reception ==
Critical reception for Crazy Love has been positive, with Publishers Weekly praising the book. Challies.com wrote that Crazy Love was "a message that Christians desperately need to hear". Bookreporter.com stated that "while the writing throughout the book is simple and clear, his dynamic communication style does not translate fully to print" but that overall the book was "definitely worth reading".
