= John MacArthur (American pastor) =

American evangelical preacher (1939–2025)

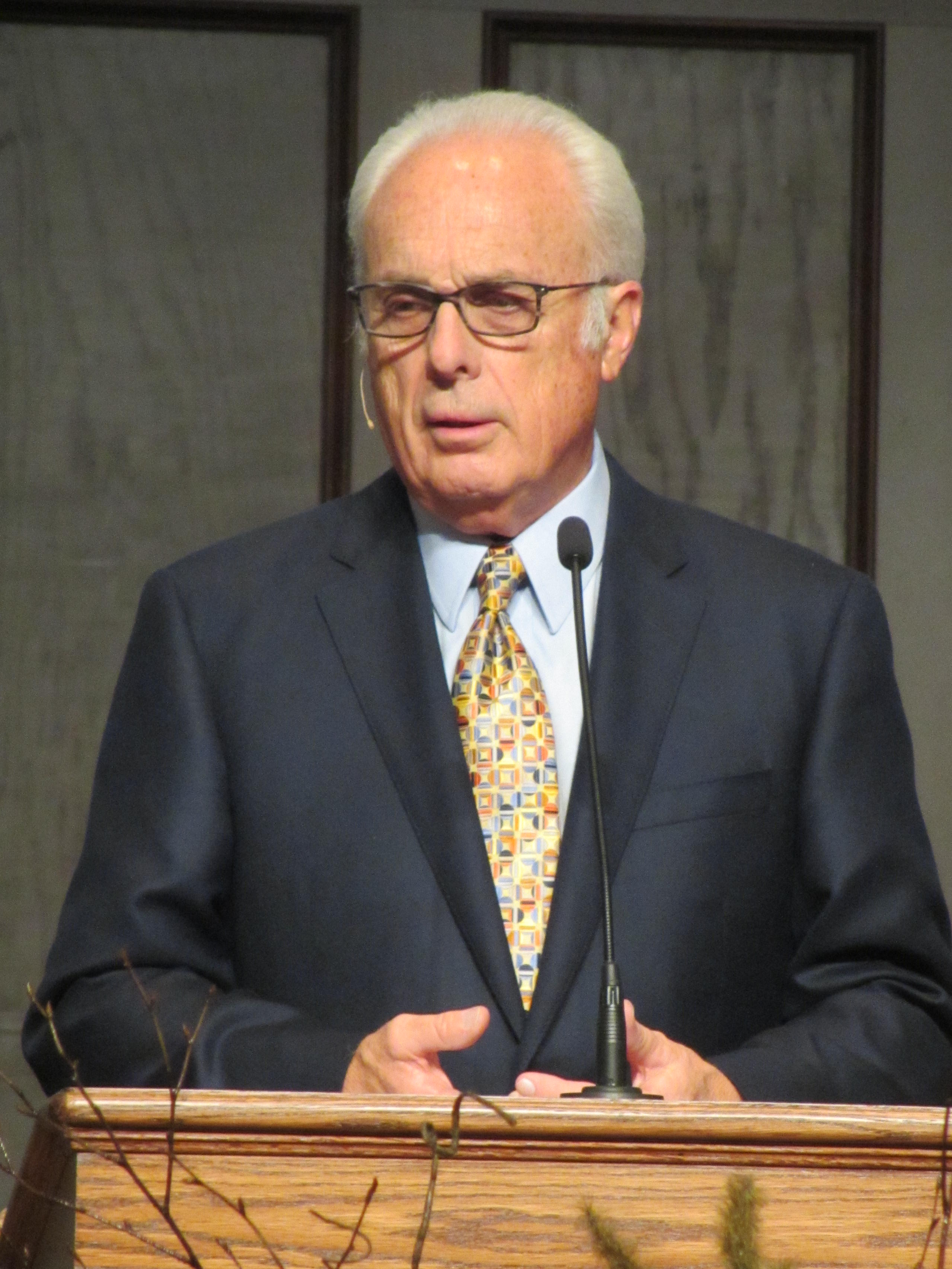
- MacArthur in 2013
- Born: John Fullerton MacArthur Jr. June 19, 1939; Los Angeles, California, U.S.
- Died: July 14, 2025 (aged 86); Santa Clarita, California, US
- Education: Bob Jones University; Los Angeles Pacific College (BA); Biola University(MDiv)
- Occupations: Pastor; televangelist; author
- Spouse: Patricia Smith (m. 1963–2025)
- Children: 4
- Relatives: MacArthur family

Ecclesiastical career
- Religion: Christianity
- Congregations: Grace Community Church, Sun Valley, California

John Fullerton MacArthur Jr. (June 19, 1939 – July 14, 2025) was an American Calvinistic Baptist pastor, theologian, author, and broadcaster. He was the founder of Grace to You, a nationally syndicated radio and television Bible teaching program. He was also the longtime pastor of Grace Community Church, a non-denominational church in Sun Valley, California from 1969 until his death in 2025. Additionally, MacArthur served as the chancellor emeritus of The Master's University and The Master's Seminary, both based in Santa Clarita, California.

MacArthur was known for his advocacy of expository preaching, and was recognized by Christianity Today as one of the most influential Christian preachers of his era. MacArthur wrote or edited more than 150 books. His The MacArthur Study Bible has sold more than one million copies and received a Gold Medallion Book Award. In 2021, he worked with a team from The Master's Seminary and the Lockman Foundation to produce the Legacy Standard Bible (LSB), an update of the 1995 edition of the New American Standard Bible (NASB).

MacArthur's radio and television program, Grace to You, began broadcasting in 1977. Over his decades-long ministry, he completed a 42-year sermon series covering the entire New Testament and remained a prominent voice in evangelical Christianity until his death in 2025.

Theologically, MacArthur was known for his staunch positions on cessationism, Young Earth creationism, complementarianism, and Lordship salvation, often sparking debate within evangelical circles. He criticized modern Charismatic practices, opposed same-sex marriage and the ordination of women, and promoted a literal interpretation of Scripture within dispensational theology. His ministry faced controversies, including disputes over pastoral qualifications, responses to domestic violence, and his defiance of COVID-19 public health mandates. MacArthur authored numerous books on theology, biblical interpretation, and Christian living.

== Early life and education ==
John Fullerton MacArthur Jr. was born on June 19, 1939, in Los Angeles, California, to Baptist radio preacher Jack MacArthur and Irene Dockendorf. He was the grandson of Canadian Anglican minister Harry MacArthur (d. 1950). In a 1979 interview, he stated that he was "distantly related to General Douglas MacArthur [...] a fifth cousin."

Following in his father's path, MacArthur attended Bob Jones University in Greenville, South Carolina from 1957 to 1959. After a gap year, he enrolled at Los Angeles Pacific College (affiliated with the Free Methodist Church) in 1960. He earned a Master of Divinity degree in 1964 from the Talbot Theological Seminary, graduate school of the Bible Institute of Los Angeles' new in La Mirada, California.

== Career ==
When MacArthur was at Bob Jones University, his father recruited him to the Voice of Calvary singing quartet, often broadcast on Christian radio in Southern California. Then, from 1964 to 1966, he was hired by his father to be an associate pastor at the Harry MacArthur Memorial Bible Church (now Calvary Bible Church) in Burbank, California, which his father Jack had planted and named for his own father. From 1966 to 1969, MacArthur served as the faculty representative for Talbot Theological Seminary. On February 9, 1969, he was brought on as the third and the youngest yet, pastor at the non-denominational Grace Community Church of Sun Valley, a neighborhood of Los Angeles adjacent to Burbank.

MacArthur's daily radio and television program, Grace to You, began as sermons from the Grace Community Church pulpit recorded on reel-to-reel (and then audio cassettes). In 1977, the sermons were first broadcast on WRBS in Baltimore, Maryland, and the radio ministry of the church was born. Also in 1977, he received an honorary degree from Grace Graduate School in 1976 and from Talbot Theological Seminary (a Doctor of Divinity degree in 1977).

In 1985, MacArthur was made the president of Los Angeles Baptist College, now The Master's University, a four-year Christian liberal arts college. In 1986, he was named the president of The Master's Seminary.

On June 5, 2011, MacArthur completed a 42 year long sermon series of the entire New Testament at Grace Community Church, a self-described life goal. In 2012, at the annual Shepherd's Conference, MacArthur was participating in a word association questionnaire when the moderator gave the name "Steven Furtick." MacArthur responded "unqualified" and proceeded to argue that Furtick, pastor of Elevation Church, was not qualified, by Biblical standards, to be a pastor. Furtick responded to this comment in his 2016 book Unqualified: How God Uses Broken People to Do Big Things. In 2019 at the Truth Matters Conference, during another word association questionnaire, MacArthur was given the prompt "Beth Moore". He responded, "Go home." Reiterating his stance on 1 Timothy 2:12, he continued, "There is no case that can be made biblically for a woman preacher. Period. Paragraph. End of discussion." Moore responded to this by posting on her X account, "I did not surrender to a calling of man when I was 18 years old. I surrendered to a calling of God. It never occurs to me for a second to not fulfill it."

In 2020 and 2021, during the COVID-19 global crisis, MacArthur contravened orders from Los Angeles County public health officials regarding services at Grace Community Church and insisted that no one from the church had become seriously ill, despite reports to the contrary. He stated that 94% of the deaths attributed to COVID-19 could not be directly attributed to the disease alone, citing data from the United States Centers for Disease Control and Prevention (CDC). Los Angeles County sued the church over its refusal to close down, and the church counter-sued, claiming that the county was violating rights to freedom of religion. Eventually, all lawsuits were settled out of court with the County of Los Angeles and the state of California paying $400,000 each to Grace Community Church.

The 2023 docu-drama, The Essential Church, details the events surrounding COVID-19 as well as GCC's response, among other churches in North America at the time. The film explores the struggle between the Church and government throughout history, paralleling modern conflict with those from the past who sacrificed their lives for their beliefs.

In March 2022, The Roys Report published an investigation critical of Grace Community Church (GCC) and its pastor, John MacArthur. Some female victims of domestic violence, according to the findings, were reportedly asked to return to their husbands or face excommunication. Hohn Cho, a GCC elder, said that he advised MacArthur to reconsider that stance.

His final sermon that he preached was at Grace Community Church on November 24, 2024.

== Theological positions ==
=== Calvinism ===
MacArthur held to classic five-point Calvinistic soteriology (total depravity, unconditional election, limited atonement, irresistible grace and perseverance of the saints).

=== Cessationism ===
MacArthur was a cessationist, who believed the "sign gifts", such as prophecy described in the Bible, were temporarily granted to the apostles to authenticate the origin and truth of the scriptures. He held that these gifts ceased to be given after the close of the Apostolic Age, having served the purpose. MacArthur was a prominent critic of the continuationist beliefs of Pentecostalism and the Charismatic movement, which assert that God continues to grant spiritual gifts today. He authored three books on the subject. In October 2013, his church hosted the "Strange Fire Conference" to mark the launch of his book, Strange Fire featuring various speakers who advocated cessationist theology and critiqued the Charismatic movement.

MacArthur said that modern "visions, revelations, voices from heaven... dreams, speaking in tongues, prophecies, out-of-body experiences, trip to heaven, anointings, miracles [are] all false, all lies, all deceptions attributed falsely to the Holy Spirit." He described the Charismatic movement as having "stolen the Holy Spirit and created a golden calf, and they're dancing around the golden calf as if it were the Holy Spirit."

=== Christology ===
In 1983, MacArthur first publicly taught the doctrine of "incarnational sonship," holding that Jesus became the Son of God at His incarnation rather than eternally existing as the Son. In 1989, after receiving criticism, he defended his views in a plenary session at the annual convention of the Independent Fundamental Churches of America (IFCA). Approximately a decade later, MacArthur retracted this position in an article published by Grace to You, stating that he had come to affirm the eternal Father-Son relationship in the Godhead and no longer regarded Christ's sonship as a role assumed only at the incarnation.

=== Complementarianism ===
MacArthur stated that he believed Scripture opposes both "male chauvinist and feminist views." He held a complementarian position on gender roles, maintaining that the Bible forbids women from preaching to men or exercising authority over men in church settings. MacArthur taught that the roles of elder and pastor are restricted to men. To support his view, he cited the biblical passages of 1 Timothy 2:11–12 and 1 Corinthians 14:34–35.

=== Dispensational theology ===
MacArthur viewed himself as being a "leaky dispensationalist" to acknowledge the areas where his views differ from traditional dispensationalism. Specifically, he emphasized a literal interpretation of Scripture and a distinction between Israel and the Church. He held to the premillennialist view of eschatology, a pre-tribulational rapture of the church, and a literal millennium. He believed the Bible teaches a completely restored Israel shall inherit physical ownership of the land of Canaan on the earth.

=== Gender and sexuality ===
MacArthur was against same-sex marriage as well as a critic of the ordination of women and the social justice movement. He delivered multiple sermons in which he discussed these issues.

With respect to sexual orientation, he asserted that "no one is gay" as "God didn't hardwire anybody" to be gay any more than he "hardwires" individuals to be adulterers or bank robbers. He compared the assertion that sexual orientation is a born trait to a hypothetical bank robber's protestation: "That's like saying, 'You know, I keep robbing banks, but I'm a robber. I'm a bank robber. What am I gonna do? I'm a bank robber.' That is not an excuse for what you do."

=== Lordship Salvation ===
MacArthur taught that Romans 10:9 describes the doctrine of Lordship salvation when it says, "if you confess with your mouth Jesus as Lord, and believe in your heart that God raised Him from the dead, you will be saved". The submission to Jesus as Lord when converting to faith in Jesus Christ became known to Arminians as the "Lordship salvation controversy" in the 1980s. MacArthur argued that one component of free grace theology is confessing Jesus Christ as Lord. He said, "You must receive Jesus Christ for who He is, both Lord and Savior, to be truly saved." Regarding eternal security, he felt that "It should never be presented merely as a matter of being once saved, always saved with no regard for what you believe or do. The writer also states frankly that only those who continue living holy lives will enter the Lord's presence." His views stirred up controversy within American evangelicalism and were challenged in print by Free Grace theologians including Charles Ryrie and Zane C. Hodges, who argued that MacArthur's ministry was teaching a form of works-based salvation. However, MacArthur defended his position by sourcing two tapes recorded in 1989 when he was asked to "reason together with the IFCA man." Defending his position, MacArthur often referenced Matthew 7:21-23:

Not everyone who says to Me,‘Lord, Lord,’ shall enter the kingdom of heaven, but he who does the will of My Father in heaven. Many will say to Me in that day, ‘Lord, Lord, have we not prophesied in Your name, cast out demons in Your name, and done many wonders in Your name?’... Then I will declare to them, ‘I never knew you; depart from Me, you who practice lawlessness!’

=== Views of slavery ===
In 2012 MacArthur stated, "It's a little strange that we have such an aversion to slavery because historically there have been abuses... To throw out slavery as a concept, simply because there have been abuses, I think is to miss the point... Working for a gentle, caring, loving master was the best of all possible worlds. If you had the right master, everything was taken care of... Slavery is not objectionable if you have the right master."

=== Young Earth creationism ===
MacArthur advocated Young Earth creationism in his book The Battle For the Beginning (2001) as well as in his sermons. Speaking about evolutionary theory, he writes that Christians "ought to expose such lies for what they are and oppose them vigorously." He argued that "the battle for the beginning is ultimately a battle between two mutually exclusive faiths—faith in Scripture versus faith in anti-theistic hypotheses. It is not really a battle between science and the Bible."

== Recognition ==
MacArthur received an honorary degree from Grace Graduate School in 1976 and from Talbot Theological Seminary (a Doctor of Divinity degree in 1977). He spoke at events, conferences, and seminars including the annual Shepherd's Conference, Keith & Kristyn Getty's Sing! Conference, the Resolved conference, and the G3 Conference.

He was a guest on CNN's Larry King Live, The Ben Shapiro Show, Fox News, and MSNBC in addition to other news programs and documentaries.

== Personal life ==
In his early years, MacArthur dreamed of playing professional football, but a serious car accident at age 18 changed the trajectory of his future.

Under Charles L. Feinberg, he studied the Bible extensively and practiced expository teaching and preaching. In 1963, MacArthur met his wife, Patricia Sue Smith, and they married in the same year. They lived in southern California and had four married children: Matt, Marcy, Mark, and Melinda as well as fifteen grandchildren, and nine great-grandchildren.

=== Illness and death ===
MacArthur was diagnosed with atrial fibrillation in January 2023 and underwent surgery to correct it with the implantation of cardiac stents. In July 2023, he had a catheter inserted to further treat the condition, and was absent from the ministry (publicly) for a few weeks. In the second half of 2024, he underwent an additional three surgeries, including an aorta replacement and a procedure on his lungs to treat fluid build-up. After several months away, he briefly returned to limited public ministry in November 2024. However, on January 6, 2025, it was reported that recovery from the surgeries had been slower than expected, and that he had been in hospital for two weeks with "occasional setbacks affecting his heart, lungs, and kidneys."

On July 13, 2025, Grace Community Church associate pastor Tom Patton announced during a Sunday service that MacArthur had contracted pneumonia and was not expected to recover. Patton said that MacArthur had been admitted to the hospital, and that he "may be in the presence of the Lord soon." MacArthur died the next evening at a hospital in Santa Clarita, California, at age 86.

His memorial service was on 23 August 2025, at Grace Community Church. It featured comments from some notable Christian figures, including John Piper, Alistair Begg, and Joni Eareckson Tada. In addition, the sermon was preached by Sinclair B. Ferguson and sung worship was, in part, led by Keith and Kristen Getty with other musical portions performed by Jubilant Sykes & John Martin.

== Selected publications ==
- The Charismatics: A Doctrinal Perspective (1978) ISBN 0-310-28490-2
- Gospel According to Jesus (1989) ISBN 0-310-28651-4
- Charismatic Chaos (1993) ISBN 0-310-57572-9
- Our Sufficiency in Christ (1998) ISBN 1-58134-013-3
- Ashamed of the Gospel: When the Church Becomes Like the World (2001) ISBN 1-58134-288-8
- Safe in the Arms of God: Truth from Heaven About the Death of a Child (July 8, 2003) ISBN 0-785-26343-8
- Think Biblically!: Recovering a Christian Worldview (2003) ISBN 1-58134-412-0
- Fool's Gold?: Discerning Truth in an Age of Error (2005) ISBN 1-58134-726-X
- Twelve Ordinary Men: How the Master Shaped His Disciples for Greatness, and What He Wants to Do with You (May 8, 2006) ISBN 0-78528824-4
- Twelve Extraordinary Women: God Shaped Women of the Bible, and What He Wants to Do with You (October 5, 2008) ISBN 1-418-57832-0
- Fundamentals of the Faith: 13 Lessons to Grow in the Grace and Knowledge of Jesus Christ (February 24, 2009) ISBN 1-575-67323-1
- The Jesus You Can't Ignore: What You Must Learn from the Bold Confrontations of Christ (2009) ISBN 1-4002-0206-X
- Saved Without A Doubt: Being Sure of Your Salvation (January 1, 2011) ISBN 1-434-70295-2
- Anxious for Nothing: God's Cure for the Cares of Your Soul (John Macarthur Study) (February 1, 2012) ISBN 0-781-40761-3
- Worship: The Ultimate Priority (2012) ISBN 0-802-40215-1
- Strange Fire: The Danger of Offending the Holy Spirit with Counterfeit Worship (2013) ISBN 978-1-4002-0517-2
- One Perfect Life: The Complete Story of the Lord Jesus (March 4, 2013) ISBN 1-401-67633-2
- Parables: The mysteries of God's Kingdom revealed through the stories Jesus told (2015) ISBN 1400203481
- The Gospel According to Paul: Embracing the Good News at the Heart of Paul's Teachings (2017) ISBN 0-718-09624-X
- Biblical Doctrine: A Systematic Summary of Bible Truth (2017) ISBN 1-433-54591-8
- None Other: Discovering the God of the Bible (2017) ISBN 1-567-69738-0
