= Grace Community Church =

Christian church in Los Angeles, California

Coordinates: 34.221093°N 118.421799°W

- Grace Community Church of the Valley, Inc.
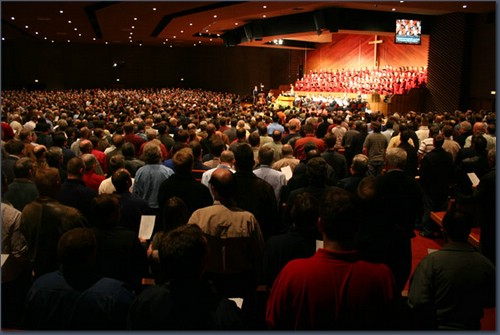
- Grace Community Church in 2007
- Grace Community Church
- Location: 13248 Roscoe Blvd. Sun Valley, CA 91352
- Country: United States
- Denomination: Non-Denominational
- Website: gracechurch.org

History
- Founded: 1956; 70 years ago

Clergy
- Pastor: Nathan Busenitz

Grace Community Church is a non-denominational, evangelical megachurch founded in 1956 and located in Sun Valley, a neighborhood in the San Fernando Valley of Los Angeles. The church is led by Senior Pastor Nathan Busenitz, who succeeded John MacArthur on August 20, 2025 as Staff Pastor, and was made permanent on August 23, 2026. As of 2008, the average weekly attendance was 8,258.

== History ==
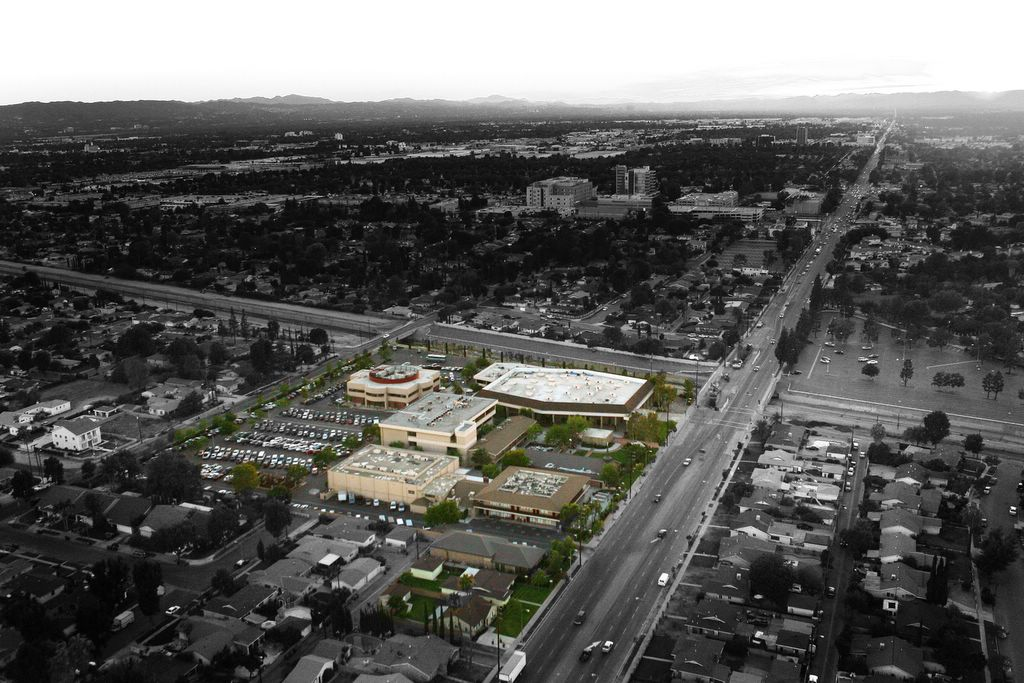
Grace Community Church Aerial View

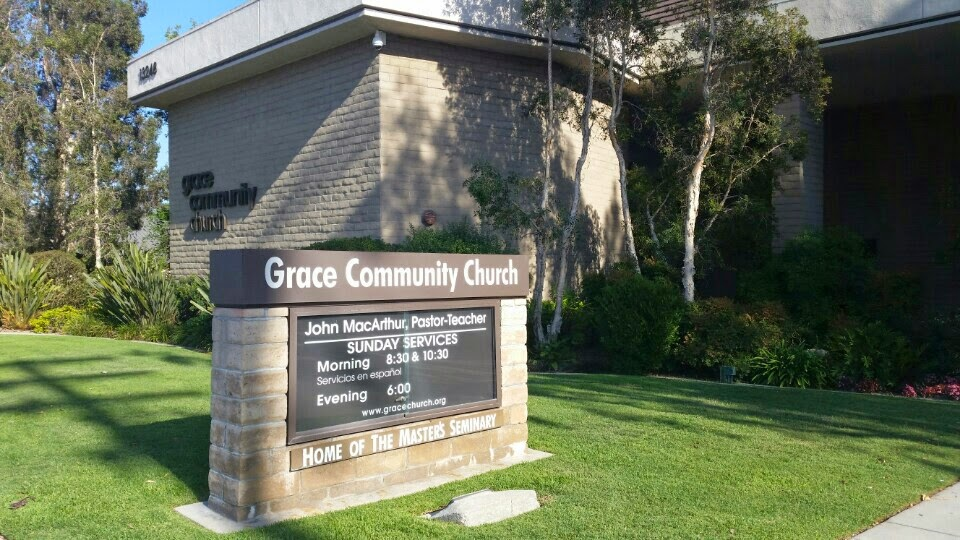
Grace Community Church in Sun Valley, CA (Jul 2014)

The church was founded as Grace Community Church of the Valley as a mission of First Presbyterian Church of Hollywood. The congregation held its first public service on July 1, 1956, calling Don Householder (former associate pastor of Trinity Methodist Church and pastor of Country Church of Hollywood) to be its founding pastor. Within a few years, the church had moved to its present location on Roscoe Boulevard, and the decision was made to hold two Sunday morning services to accommodate the growing congregation.

Following Householder's death in 1965, Richard Elvee was called to be pastor and the church continued to grow under his leadership until he died in 1968. In February 1969, John F. MacArthur assumed the pastorate. During the early days of MacArthur's ministry, the church doubled in size every two years, which led to the building of the Family Life Center in 1971 and a new Worship Center in 1977. In 1972, Moody Monthly magazine published a feature article about the congregation titled "The church with nine hundred ministers". MacArthur served 56 years at the church until his death on July 14, 2025. Nathan Busenitz, who has been on staff at the church since 2003, was named Staff Pastor after the memorial service, and named senior pastor one year later.

== Distinctives ==
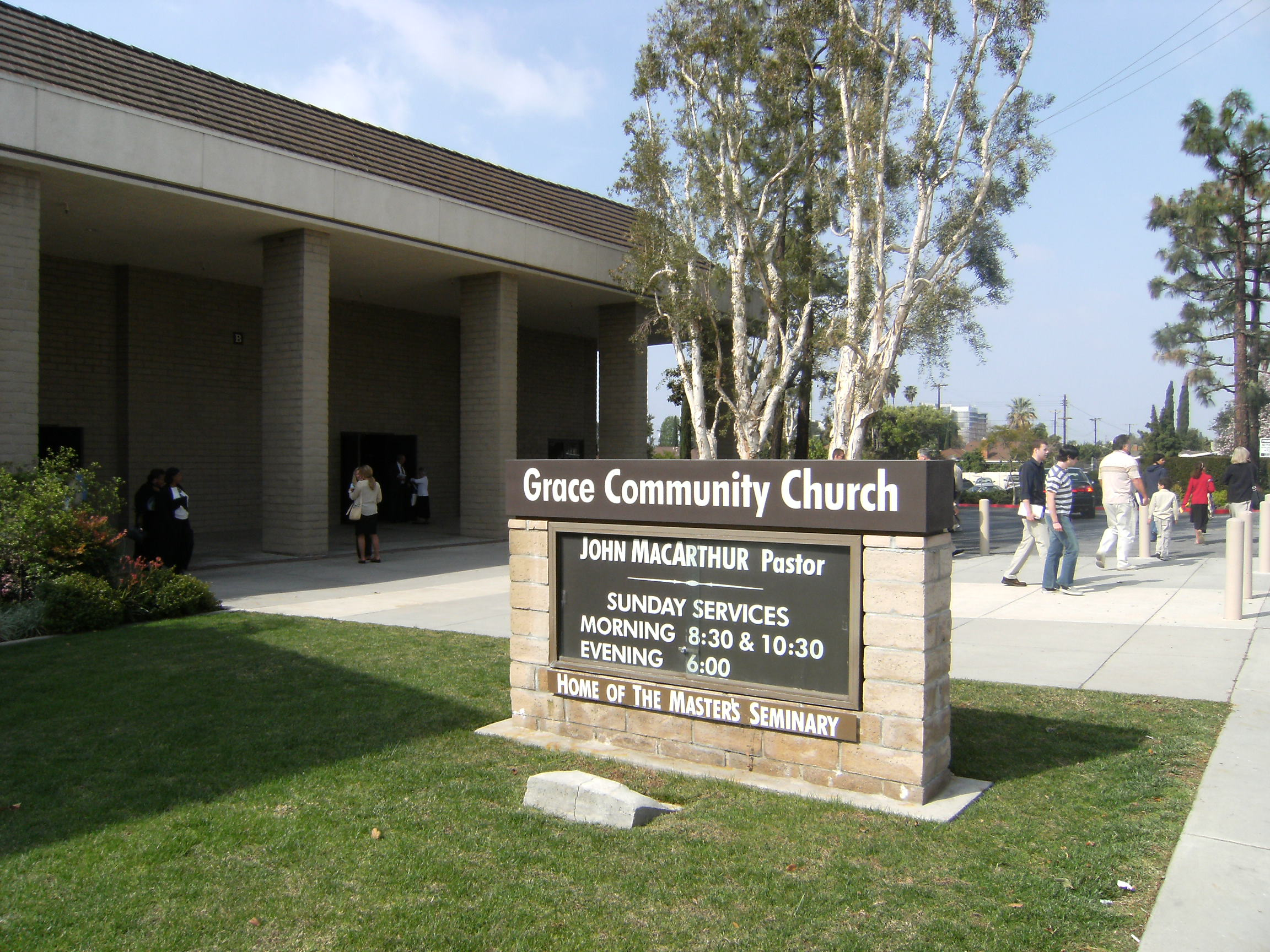
Grace Community Church building

Grace Community Church is elder-ruled. It teaches Calvinist theology, although it is not aligned with a denomination. Grace Community Church holds to the beliefs of the cessation of supernatural spiritual gifts, Lordship salvation, and the sufficiency of Scripture. The church teaches believer's baptism by immersion.

== Response to and matters surrounding COVID-19 ==
In August 2020, amid the COVID-19 pandemic, the church leadership permitted defiance of local health orders by not wearing masks or social distancing. "The good news is, you're here, you're not distancing, and you're not wearing masks," Pastor MacArthur told the congregation. "And it's also good news that you're not outside, because it's very hot out there. So the Lord knew we needed to be inside and unmasked." The State of California and Los Angeles County attempted to prevent the church from holding large indoor services during the COVID-19 pandemic. In the legal battles that started as a result of the faith-driven defiance, Grace Community Church was represented by Jenna Ellis, Senior Legal Advisor to the Trump 2020 Campaign.

In early September 2020, the county of Los Angeles Public Works Department sent a notice to the church advising them of the termination of the church's parking lot lease along the water viaduct, which the church had held since 1975. Lawyers for Grace Community said this move by the county was in response to the church's decision to hold indoor worship services during the pandemic. Restrictions were lifted November 12, 2020.

On October 22, 2020, three cases of COVID-19 were reported among Grace Community Church attendees. In a statement, Jenna Ellis admitted that the positive COVID-19 cases had been confirmed but disputed the use of the word "outbreak" based on the fact only 3 had been reported. The Department of Public Health, however, defines an outbreak as 3 or more cases. Grace Community Church continued with in-person services the following Sunday in defiance of a court order requiring the church to stop.

After the COVID shutdown ended, the church promptly sued the city and the state in order to recoup losses from being unpermitted to meet in person. In September 2021, California courts ruled that Grace Community Church’s constitutional right to religious liberty had been violated, and the State of California and Los Angeles County governments agreed to a settlement of $400k each ($800k in total) to be paid to the church in legal fees.

In March 2022, during the annual Shepherds Conference, it was announced that Grace Community Church would produce The Essential Church, a feature-length documentary about the global church, persecution, and its response to COVID-19 restrictions.

== Accusations of improper response to domestic abuse ==
In March 2022, The Roys Report published an investigation implicating Grace Community Church and John MacArthur. Several women victims of domestic violence were reportedly asked to return to their husbands, under threat of excommunication. Carey Hardy, an associate pastor, allegedly told a victim to lead by example and "suffer for Jesus" by enduring her husband’s abuse. A church elder, Hohn Cho, allegedly urged MacArthur to reconsider the situation, who told him "forget it." In May 2002 and August 2002, the church publicly announced church discipline proceedings in front of the congregation regarding the woman for having divorced her husband. In 2005, the victim's husband was sentenced to 21 years in prison for aggravated child molestation, corporal injury to a child, and child abuse.

== See also ==
- The Master's University
- The Master's Seminary
