= The Master's University =

Christian university in Santa Clarita, California

Coordinates: 34.381°N 118.520°W

- Aerial view of The Master's University
- Former names: Los Angeles Baptist College and Seminary (1927–1985); The Master's College (1985–2016)
- Motto: For Christ and Scripture
- Type: Private university
- Established: 1927
- Affiliations: The Master's Seminary
- Religious affiliation: Non-denominational, conservative Christianity
- President: Abner Chou
- Faculty: 113
- Administrative staff: 52
- Students: 2,890
- Undergraduates: 1,952 (+154 degree completion)
- Postgraduates: 92 (+375 seminary)
- Location: 21726 Placerita Canyon Road; Santa Clarita, California 91321
- Campus: Suburban
- Colors: Navy Blue & Gold
- Nickname: Mustangs
- Sporting affiliations: NAIA – GSAC
- Mascot: Monty the Mustang
- Website: masters.edu
- Location in Santa Clarita Location in California Location in California

The Master's University (TMU) is a private non-denominational Evangelical university in Santa Clarita, California.

== History ==
The college was founded in 1927. It was originally named Los Angeles Baptist College and Seminary. In 1961, it moved to Newhall in Santa Clarita, California. In 1985, John MacArthur became the school president; the name was changed to The Master's College, hoping to appeal to a wider evangelical audience. In 2016, the school underwent another name change and became The Master's University. In June 2019 John MacArthur stepped down as president and became chancellor and John Stead, a faculty member since 1970, became the interim president. In 2020, Sam Horn became president of The Master's University and Seminary. John Stead in his 50th year at TMU took the role of Senior Vice President. Dr. Abner Chou has served as the President of TMUS since 2021, including serving on an interim the year.

== Academics ==
Academic rankings

National
- Washington Monthly: 440 of 442

The university consists of seven schools offering bachelor's degrees and master's degrees, including several bachelor's degrees that are offered fully online. The associated seminary offers a Bachelor of Theology (Th.B.) for those with an associate degree, master's degrees, and Doctor of Ministry (D.Min.) and Doctor of Philosophy (Ph.D.) degrees.

In addition to its biblical studies program, the university offers a one-year, intensive Bible training program known as "The Master's Institute" resulting in a Bible certificate. The university has an extension campus, Israel Bible Extension (IBEX) in the Jerusalem vicinity.

The university's schools are the School of Biblical Studies, Pearl C. Schaffer School of Education, John P. Stead School of Humanities, Paul T. Plew School of Music, School of Online Education, School of Business & Communication, School of Science, Mathematics, Technology & Health.

It teaches that "the Bible is true".

=== Accreditation ===
The university has been accredited by the WASC Senior College and University Commission or its predecessor since 1975. In July 2018, it was placed on probation. WASC reported a lack of qualified leadership and "a climate of fear, intimidation, bullying, and uncertainty" among faculty and staff as reasons for the probation. Probation was lifted in November 2020.

The school is a member of the Association of Christian Schools International. The school also holds Evangelical Council for Financial Accountability (ECFA) accreditation. The School of Music is also accredited by the National Association of Schools of Music.

=== LGBT discrimination ===
The university prohibits "homosexuality or bisexual conduct" by students in its student handbook. The university may legally expel LGBT students because it has a religious exemption from anti-discrimination laws. Chancellor John MacArthur has spoken and written at length in university publications about the threat he perceives from a so-called gay agenda, asserting that "biblical love excludes homosexuality because of its sinfulness".

The Master's University is ranked among the worst American schools for LGBT students by LGBTQ Nation and Campus Pride.

== Athletics ==
The Master's athletic teams are called the Mustangs. The university is a member of the National Association of Intercollegiate Athletics (NAIA), primarily competing in the Golden State Athletic Conference (GSAC) for most of its sports since the 2001–2002 academic year; while its men's & women's swimming & diving teams compete in the Pacific Collegiate Swim and Dive Conference (PCSC).

The Master's compete in 18 intercollegiate varsity sports: Men's sports include baseball, basketball, cross country, golf, soccer, swimming & diving, track & field (outdoor) and volleyball; while women's sports include basketball, beach volleyball, cross country, golf, soccer, swimming & diving, track & field (indoor and outdoor) and volleyball.

=== Soccer ===
Curtis Lewis, head coach of the women's soccer team, won the NAIA Women's Soccer Coach of the Year Award in 2008. In 2009, Jim Rickard won the NAIA Men's Soccer Coach of the Year Award.

== Notable alumni ==
- Francis Chan (1992) – author, teacher, and preacher
- Ralph Drollinger – clergyman and professional basketball player
- Robert H. Gundry – biblical scholar
- Conner Menez – professional baseball player
- Jerry Owens – professional baseball player
- Mike Penberthy – professional basketball player and coach
- Erin Buescher Perperoglou – professional basketball player
- Tim Soares (born 1997) – professional basketball player

== See also ==
- The Master's Seminary
