= New American Standard Bible =

English translation of the Bible

- Abbreviation: NASB (Note: The New American Standard Bible can also be found abbreviated as the NAS (New American Standard).)
- NT published: 1963
- Complete Bible published: 1971
- Derived from: American Standard Version
- Textual basis: OT: Biblia Hebraica Stuttgartensia; Biblia Hebraica Quinta (for books available); additional sources; NT: Novum Testamentum Graece (28th ed., 2012)
- Translation type: Formal equivalence
- Reading level: 11.0
- Version revision: 1977, 1995, 2020
- Publisher: Lockman Foundation
- Copyright: New American Standard Bible; Copyright © 1960, 1962, 1963, 1968, 1971, 1972, 1973, 1975, 1977, 1995, 2020 by The Lockman Foundation; A Corporation Not for Profit; La Habra, California; All Rights Reserved www.lockman.org
- Webpage: www.lockman.org/new-american-standard-bible-nasb/
- Genesis 1:1–3 In the beginning God created the heavens and the earth. And the earth was a formless and desolate emptiness, and darkness was over the surface of the deep, and the Spirit of God was hovering over the surface of the waters. Then God said, "Let there be light"; and there was light. John 3:16 "For God so loved the world, that He gave His only Son, so that everyone who believes in Him will not perish, but have eternal life.

The New American Standard Bible (NASB, also simply NAS for "New American Standard") is a translation of the Bible in contemporary English. Published by the Lockman Foundation, the complete NASB was released in 1971. New revisions were published in 1995 and 2020. The NASB relies on recently published critical editions of the original Hebrew, Aramaic, and Greek texts. It is known for preferring a literal translation style that generally preserves the structure of the original language when possible (formal equivalence), rather than an idiomatic style that attempts to match natural English usage.

== Translation philosophy ==
The New American Standard Bible is considered by some sources as the most literally translated of major 20th-century English Bible translations.

The NASB is an original translation from the Hebrew, Aramaic, and Greek texts. It is an update of the American Standard Version (ASV) of 1901, which itself was a revision of the 1885 Revised Version (RV), which updated the King James Version (KJV). The goal of the translation was to incorporate Hebrew and Greek texts discovered since 1901, as well as render a translation in more current English than the ASV and KJV. The main alternative at the time was the Revised Standard Version (1946–1952/1971), but it was considered overly theologically liberal in parts.

The Hebrew text used for this translation was the 3rd edition of Rudolf Kittel's Biblia Hebraica as well as the Dead Sea Scrolls. The Biblia Hebraica Stuttgartensia was consulted for the 1995 revision. For the Greek text, Eberhard Nestle and Kurt Aland's Novum Testamentum Graece was used; the 23rd edition in the 1971 original, and the 26th in the 1995 revision.

Desiring to create a literal, modern translation of the Bible into English, the translators sought to produce a contemporary English Bible while maintaining a formal equivalence translation style. There remain cases where word-for-word literalness was determined to be unacceptable or impossible, and there, changes were made in the direction of more current idioms. In some such instances, the more literal renderings were indicated in footnotes.

=== YHWH ===
One notable area where the NASB differs from the ASV is in how to render the Tetragrammaton, YHWH. The ASV rendered it as "Jehovah". The ASV translators defended the decision by calling the avoidance of the Divine Name a "Jewish superstition". Most later translations, including the NASB, have generally not agreed with it, and the NASB renders it as LORD or GOD in capital letters. The committee stated the reason as:

This name has not been pronounced by the Jews because of reverence for the great sacredness of the divine name. Therefore it has been consistently translated LORD. The only exception is when it occurs in immediate proximity to the word Lord, that is, Adonai. In that case it is regularly translated GOD in order to avoid confusion. It is known that for many years YHWH has been transliterated as Yahweh, however no complete certainty attaches to this pronunciation.

== Revisions ==
The Lockman Foundation published NASB text, modifications, and revisions in the following order:

- Gospel of John (1960)
- The Gospels (1962)
- New Testament (1963)
- Psalms (1968)
- Complete Bible (Old Testament and New Testament; 1971)
- Minor text modifications (1972, 1973, 1975)
- Major text revisions (1977, 1995, 2020)

=== 1995 revision ===
In 1992, the Lockman Foundation commissioned a limited revision of the NASB. In 1995, the Lockman Foundation reissued the NASB text as the NASB Updated Edition (more commonly, the Updated NASB or NASB95). Since then, it has become widely known as simply the "NASB", supplanting the 1977 text in current printings, save for a few (Thompson Chain Reference Bibles, Open Bibles, Key Word Study Bibles, et al.).

In the updated NASB, consideration was given to the latest available manuscripts with an emphasis on determining the best Greek text. Primarily, the 26th edition of Nestle-Aland's Novum Testamentum Graece is closely followed. The Biblia Hebraica Stuttgartensia is also employed together with the most recent information from lexicography, cognate languages, and the Dead Sea Scrolls.

The updated NASB represents recommended revisions and refinements, and states that it incorporates thorough research based on current English usage. Vocabulary, grammar, and sentence structure were meticulously revised for greater understanding and smoother reading, hence increasing clarity and readability. Terms found in Elizabethan English such as "thy" and "thou" have been modernized, while verses with difficult word ordering are restructured. Punctuation and paragraphing have been formatted for modernization, and verbs with multiple meanings have been updated to better account for their contextual usage.

=== 2020 revision ===
Starting in 2018, the Lockman Foundation posted some passages from "NASB 2020", an update of the 1995 revision. Key differences from the 1995 revision include an effort to improve "gender accuracy" (for example, adding "or sisters" in italics to passages that reference "brothers", to help convey the mixed-gender meaning of a passage that might otherwise be misunderstood as only speaking of men), a shift (where applicable) from the common construct "let us" when proposing action to the more-contemporary construct "let's" (to disambiguate a sort of "imperative" encouragement rather than a seeking of permission that could otherwise be misunderstood from a given passage), and a repositioning of some "bracketed text" (that is, verses or portions of verses that are not present in earliest Biblical manuscripts, and thus printed in brackets in previous NASB editions) out from inline-and-in-brackets down instead to footnotes.

== Translators ==
The translation work was done by a group sponsored by the Lockman Foundation. According to the Lockman Foundation, the committee consisted of people from Christian educational institutions of higher learning and from Evangelical Protestant, predominantly conservative, denominations (Presbyterian, Methodist, Southern Baptist, Church of Christ, Nazarene, American Baptist, Fundamentalist, Conservative Baptist, Free Methodist, Congregational, Disciples of Christ, Evangelical Free, Independent Baptist, Independent Mennonite, Assembly of God, North American Baptist, and "other religious groups").

The Lockman Foundation's website indicates that among the translators and consultants who contributed are Biblical scholars with doctorates in Biblical languages, Christian theology, "or other advanced degrees", and come from a variety of denominational backgrounds. More than 20 individuals worked on modernizing the NASB in accord with the most recent research. While previously the Lockman Foundation withheld the names of the scholars involved they now are all named on their website for each edition.

== See also ==
- Modern English Bible translations
