= Philip B. Payne =

American theologian (born 1948)

- Born: Philip Barton Payne; July 2, 1948 (age 78); Rockville Centre, New York, U.S.
- Spouse: Nancy Catherine Payne

Academic background
- Education: Wheaton College (BA); Trinity Evangelical Divinity School (MA, MDiv); University of Cambridge (PhD)
- Alma mater: Selwyn College, University of Cambridge
- Thesis: Metaphor as a Model for Interpretation of the Parables of Jesus with Special Reference to the Parable of the Sower (1976)
- Doctoral advisor: John Philip McMurdo Sweet

Academic work
- Discipline: Biblical studies
- Institutions: Fuller Theological Seminary
- Main interests: Christian egalitarianism; Pauline theology; New Testament textual variants; parables of Jesus
- Website: pbpayne.com

Philip Barton Payne (born July 2, 1948) is an American New Testament scholar and theologian whose work is centered on Christian egalitarianism. He has authored three books and published a number of articles on the topic. Payne is the founder and president of Linguist's Software, a company based in Edmonds (Washington) that develops fonts for Microsoft Windows and macOS.

== Biography ==
Born in Rockville Centre, New York, Payne is one of the four sons of John Barton, conservative Old Testament scholar, and Dorothy Dean (née Dosker).

Payne graduated biology (pre-medical) from Wheaton College in 1969. After receiving his MA and MDiv in NT studies from the Trinity Evangelical Divinity School, he went to Tübingen, where he studied under Martin Hengel and Peter Stuhlmacher for a year. He then received his PhD from the Selwyn College, University of Cambridge in 1976, his doctoral advisor being Rev. John Philip McMurdo Sweet. Following this, Payne became a missionary for the Evangelical Free Church of America in Japan, serving from 1976 to 1984. Until 2014, Payne had sporadically taught at Cambridge, Trinity, Gordon–Conwell, Bethel, and Fuller Theological Seminary.

Payne is a member of the Evangelical Free Church of America, which has declared itself to be complementarian. He is also a member of the Society of Biblical Literature, Christians for Biblical Equality, and the Evangelical Theological Society.

In addition to English, Payne uses French, German, Greek, Hebrew, and Japanese.

== Research ==
=== Christian egalitarianism ===
Most of Payne's scholarship is concerned with the status of women in the Bible. Although initially a complementarian, Payne became convinced of egalitarianism after rereading certain parts of the Bible commonly considered misogynistic, which he thinks was motivated by his belief in biblical inerrancy.

In his volume Man and Woman, One in Christ, Payne argues that the Bible continuously affirms and teaches equality between men and women. For instance, he interprets 1 Timothy 2:11–15 as Paul prohibiting a woman from “seizing authority to teach a man” only in the context of a crisis of false teaching in Ephesus, which mostly involved women. Similar interpretations are also present in other egalitarian exegetes. Payne also regards 1 Corinthians 14:34–35 as an interpolation, a view that has gained increasing popularity among many critical scholars.

=== Codex Vaticanus ===
Payne has published research making the case that Codex Vaticanus, a 4th-century Greek manuscript of the Bible, contains what he called distigmai-obeloi—specific symbols in the manuscript that represent additions to the New Testament text. According to Payne, these symbols go back to the original scribe of Vaticanus. While scholars generally accept the existence of distigmai-obeloi and their purpose, his claims regarding their originality have been severely criticized. Payne has since publicly responded to the criticism.

== Bibliography ==
=== Books ===
- Payne, Philip B. (2009). Man and Woman, One in Christ: An Exegetical and Theological Study of Paul's Letters. Grand Rapids: Zondervan Academic. ISBN 978-0-310-21988-0.
- ———; Huffaker, Vince (2021). Why Can't Women Do That? Breaking Down the Reasons Churches Put Men in Charge. Boulder: Vinati Press. ISBN 979-8-9851174-0-0.
- ——— (2023). The Bible vs. Biblical Womanhood: How God's Word Consistently Affirms Gender Equality. Grand Rapids: Zondervan. ISBN 978-0-310-14030-6.

=== Articles ===
- ——— (1995). "Fuldensis, Sigla for Variants in Vaticanus, and 1 Cor 14.34–5". New Testament Studies. 41 (2): 240–262. doi:10.1017/S0028688500021263. Archived from the original on 2024-04-11.
- ——— (1998). "Ms. 88 as Evidence for a Text without 1 Cor 14.34–5". New Testament Studies. 44: 152–158. doi:10.1017/S0028688500016428.
- ———; Canart, Paul (2000). "The Originality of Text-Critical Symbols in Codex Vaticanus". Novum Testamentum. 42 (2): 105–113. doi:10.1163/156853600506799. Archived from the original on 2025-04-15.
- ——— (2008). "1 Tim 2.12 and the Use of οὐδέ to Combine Two Elements to Express a Single Idea". New Testament Studies. 54 (2): 235–253. doi:10.1017/S0028688508000131.
- ——— (2017). "Vaticanus Distigme-obelos Symbols Marking Added Text, Including 1 Corinthians 14.34–5". New Testament Studies. 63 (4): 604–625. doi:10.1017/S0028688517000121.
