= Walter Kaiser Jr. =

American Old Testament scholar, writer, public speaker and educator (born 1933)

Walter C. Kaiser Jr.
- Born: April 11, 1933 (age 93); Folcroft, Pennsylvania, U.S.
- Known for: Old Testament scholar, writer, public speaker, educator
- Title: Colman M. Mockler distinguished Professor of Old Testament
- Board member of: President of the Evangelical Theological Society
- Spouses: Marge (m. 1957–2013); Nancy (m. 2017)
- Children: 4
- Awards: Danforth Teacher Study Grant

Academic background
- Education: Wheaton College (BA, 1955 and BDiv, 1958); Brandeis University (MA, 1962)
- Alma mater: Brandeis University (PhD, 1973)
- Thesis: The Ugaritic Pantheon (1973)
- Doctoral advisor: Cyrus H. Gordon

Academic work
- Discipline: Biblical studies
- Sub-discipline: OT studies
- Institutions: Trinity Evangelical Divinity School; Gordon-Conwell Theological Seminary

Walter C. Kaiser Jr. (born April 11, 1933) is an American Evangelical Old Testament scholar, writer, public speaker, and educator. Kaiser is the Colman M. Mockler distinguished Professor of Old Testament and former President of Gordon-Conwell Theological Seminary in South Hamilton, Massachusetts, retired June 30, 2006. He was succeeded by James Emery White.

== Life and career ==
Kaiser was born in 1933 in Folcroft, Pennsylvania of German Baptist parents, Walter Christian Kaiser Sr. and Estelle Jaworsky Kaiser. He earned his A.B. from Wheaton College, his B.D. from Wheaton Graduate School, and both his M.A. and Ph.D. in Mediterranean studies from Brandeis University. Until 2006, he served as president of Gordon-Conwell Theological Seminary (GCTS). Previous to his appointment at GCTS he was academic dean and Professor of Old Testament at Trinity Evangelical Divinity School, where he taught for more than twenty years. In 1977 he served as president of the Evangelical Theological Society. A recipient of the Danforth Teacher Study Grant, Kaiser is a member of the Wheaton College Scholastic Honor Society.

Prior to coming to Gordon-Conwell, Kaiser taught Bible and archeology at Wheaton College and taught at Trinity Evangelical Divinity School in several capacities. In addition to teaching in the Old Testament department, he was senior vice president of education, academic dean, and senior vice president of distance learning and ministries. Kaiser currently serves on the boards of several Christian organizations.

Kaiser has contributed to such publications as Journal for the Study of the Old Testament, Journal of the Evangelical Theological Society, Christianity Today, Westminster Theological Journal, and Evangelical Quarterly. He has also written numerous books. He is a critic of, and rejects the Documentary Hypothesis.

== Works ==
=== Books ===
- Kaiser, Walter C. Jr. (1972). Classical Evangelical Essays in Old Testament Interpretation. Grand Rapids, MI: Baker Book House. ISBN 978-0-8010-5314-6. OCLC 417680.
- ——— (1978). Toward an Old Testament Theology. Grand Rapids, MI: Zondervan. ISBN 978-0-310-37100-7. OCLC 3627351.
- ——— (1979). Ecclesiastes: Total Life. Everyman's Bible Commentary Series. Chicago, IL: Moody Press. ISBN 978-0-8024-2022-0.
- ——— (1981). Toward an Exegetical Theology: Biblical exegesis for preaching and teaching. Grand Rapids, MI: Baker Book House. ISBN 978-0-8010-5425-9. OCLC 7361170.
- ——— (1982). A Biblical Approach to Personal Suffering. Chicago, IL: Moody Press. ISBN 978-0-8024-4634-3.
- ——— (1983). Toward Old Testament Ethics. Chicago, IL: Moody Press. ISBN 978-0-310-37110-6. OCLC 9827098.
- ——— (1984). Malachi: God's Unchanging Love. Grand Rapids, MI: Baker Book House. ISBN 978-0-8010-5464-8. OCLC 10926624.
- ——— (1985). The Uses of the Old Testament in the New. Chicago, IL: Moody Press. ISBN 978-0-8024-9085-8. OCLC 11814301.
- ——— (1986). Quest for Personal Renewal: Revival in the Old Testament. Chicago, IL: Moody Press. ISBN 978-0-8024-7050-8.
- ——— (1986). Quality Living. Moody Elective Series. Chicago, IL: Moody Press. ISBN 978-0-8024-7069-0.
- ——— (1987). Toward Rediscovering the Old Testament. Chicago, IL: Moody Press. ISBN 978-0-310-37120-5. OCLC 15017539.
- ——— (1988). Hard Sayings of the Old Testament. Downers Grove, IL: InterVarsity Press. ISBN 978-0-8308-1221-9. OCLC 17841939.
- ——— (1989). Back toward the Future: Hints for Interpreting Biblical Prophecy. Grand Rapids, MI: Baker Book House. ISBN 978-0-8010-5499-0. OCLC 19270676.
- ——— (1992). More Hard Sayings of the Old Testament. Downers Grove, IL: InterVarsity Press. ISBN 978-0-8308-1748-1.
- ——— (1992). Ogilvie, Lloyd J. (ed.). Micah-Malachi. The Communicator's Commentary. Vol. 21. W Pub Group.
- ———; Bock, Darrell L.; Blaising, Craig A., eds. (1992). Dispensationalism, Israel and the Church: the search for definition. Grand Rapids, MI: Zondervan. ISBN 978-0-310-34611-1. OCLC 25915459.
- ———; Silva, Moisés (1994). Introduction to Biblical Hermeneutics. Grand Rapids, MI: Zondervan. ISBN 978-0-310-53090-9. OCLC 29258790.
- ——— (1995). The Messiah in the Old Testament. Grand Rapids, MI: Zondervan. ISBN 978-0-310-20030-7. OCLC 32276242.
- ——— (1995). Psalms: Heart to Heart with God. Great Books of the Bible. Grand Rapids, MI: Zondervan. ISBN 978-0-310-49871-1.
- ——— (1995). Proverbs: Wisdom for Everyday Life. Great Books of the Bible. Grand Rapids, MI: Zondervan. ISBN 978-0-310-49861-2.
- ——— (1998). A History of Israel: From the Bronze Age Through the Jewish Wars. Nashville, TN: Broadman & Holman. ISBN 978-0-8054-6284-5. OCLC 37527534.
- ——— (1998). The Christian and the "Old" Testament. Pasadena, CA: William Carey Library. ISBN 978-0-87808-292-6.
- ———; Bahnsen, Greg L.; et al. (1999). Gundry, Stanley N. (ed.). Five Views on Law and Gospel. Counterpoints. Grand Rapids, MI: Zondervan. ISBN 978-0-310-21271-3.
- ——— (2000). Mission in the Old Testament. Grand Rapids, MI: Baker Book House. ISBN 978-0-8010-2228-9. OCLC 42619687.
- ——— (2001). The Old Testament Documents: Are They Reliable & Relevant?. Downers Grove, IL: InterVarsity Press. ISBN 978-0-8308-1975-1. OCLC 46936308.
- ——— (2001). Revive Us Again: Your Wakeup Call for Spiritual Renewal. Fearn, Scotland: Christian Focus Publications. ISBN 978-1-85792-687-3.
- ———; Bristow, George (2001). The Promise of God: God's Unchangeable Purpose Through Human History. Port Colborne, ON, Canada: Gospel Folio Press. ISBN 978-1-882701-29-2.
- ——— (2002). Micah/Nahum/Habakkuk/Zephaniah/Haggai/Zechariah/Malachi. The Preacher's Commentary. Nashville, TN: Thomas Nelson Inc. ISBN 978-1-4185-8757-4.
- ——— (2003). Preaching and Teaching from the Old Testament: a guide for the church. Grand Rapids, MI: Baker Academic. ISBN 978-0-8010-2610-2. OCLC 50676369.
- ———; Garrett, Duane A., eds. (2006). The Archaeological Study Bible: An Illustrated Walk Through Biblical History and Culture (NIV ed.). Grand Rapids, MI: Zondervan. ISBN 978-0-310-92606-1. - other bible versions and editions are available
- ——— (2007). The Majesty of God in the Old Testament: A Guide for Preaching and Teaching. Grand Rapids, MI: Baker Academic. ISBN 978-0-8010-3244-8. OCLC 74940979.
- ——— (2009). The Promise-Plan of God: A Biblical Theology of the Old and New Testaments. Grand Rapids, MI: Zondervan. ISBN 978-0-310-86667-1.
- ———; Berding, Kenneth; et al. (2008). Gundry, Stanley N. (ed.). Three Views on the New Testament Usage of the Old Testament. Counterpoints. Grand Rapids, MI: Zondervan. ISBN 978-0-310-27333-2. OCLC 192081109.
- ——— (2009). What Does the Lord Require: A Guide for Preaching and Teaching Biblical Ethics. Grand Rapids, MI: Baker Academic. ISBN 978-1-4412-0530-8.
- ——— (2009). Recovering the Unity of the Bible: One Continuous Story, Plan, and Purpose. Grand Rapids, MI: Zondervan. ISBN 978-0-310-32024-1.
- ———; Vanhoozer, Kevin J.; et al. (2009). Gundry, Stanley N. (ed.). Four Views on Moving Beyond the Bible to Theology'. Counterpoints. Grand Rapids, MI: Zondervan. ISBN 978-0-310-27655-5.
- ——— (2019). Walking the Ancient Paths: A Commentary on Jeremiah. Evangelical Exegetical Commentary. Bellingham, WA: Lexham Press. ISBN 978-1-683-59267-9.
