= Harold A. Netland =

American philosopher and missionary (born 1955)

- Born: 1955 (age 70–71); Japan
- Title: Professor of Philosophy of Religion and Intercultural Studies

Academic background
- Education: Biola University; Claremont Graduate University
- Alma mater: Claremont Graduate University (PhD)
- Thesis: Divine transcendence and informative talk about God : a defense of the meaningfulness of God-talk (1983)

Academic work
- Discipline: Religious studies
- Sub-discipline: Pluralism studies
- Institutions: Trinity Evangelical Divinity School

Harold A. Netland (born 1955), is a missionary educator turned academic. He is the author or editor of nine books and many journal articles on the topic of religion and philosophy.

== Early life and education ==
Netland grew up in Japan, the child of American missionaries. He did his undergraduate work at Biola University and received his M.A. and Ph.D. from Claremont Graduate University.

== Career ==
Netland worked in Japan for the Evangelical Free Church of America for nine years where he taught at Tokyo Christian University. In 1993 he moved back to the United States and joined Trinity Evangelical Divinity School as Professor of Philosophy of Religion and Intercultural Studies. He served for several years as the Director of the PhD/Intercultural Studies program at 'TEDS'.

From 2003 to 2006 Netland was a member of the executive committee of the Evangelical Philosophical Society.

Netland is considered an authority in the field of religious pluralism and is often quoted on such matters. Johnson quotes him in his article on John Hick's 'pluralism Hypothesis' - "To say that truth is propositional, then, is to recognize that although 'true' and 'truth' can be used in a variety of ways, in the logically basic sense truth is a quality or property of propositions. That is, truth is a property of propositions such that a proposition is true if and only if the state of affairs to which refers is as the proposition asserts it to be; otherwise it is false." When attempting to validate a position on Eastern Orthodox theology the author Adam Sparks makes reference to Netland work and expertise.

One of John Hick's former students and now established in his own right, Netland has taken a more critical stance of his erstwhile tutor's work. This critique can mainly be found with Netland's 2001 work Encountering Religious Pluralism: The Challenge to Christian Faith & Mission where he takes an evangelical position on Hick's proposals.

According to Kärkkäinen, Netland believes that modern religious pluralism (the idea that all religions are equally true or valid) creates serious problems for Christian theology. Netland argues that this view grew out of modern skepticism about truth and the rise of secular thinking, which tend to value personal spiritual experience more than doctrinal beliefs. Netland rejects the idea that all religions are equally correct or that their conflicting truth claims do not matter. Instead, he points out that religions make very different and often incompatible claims about God, human nature, and salvation. He maintains that truth is real and can be expressed in clear statements, while also recognizing that it involves a personal relationship. He suggests that religions should be evaluated based on logical consistency and moral coherence. Netland supports an evangelical Christian approach that is grounded in the Bible, seeks to understand other religions accurately, and emphasizes the importance of Christian mission because of its conviction that Christianity's claims are uniquely true.

== Works ==
=== Books ===
- Netland, Harold A. (1991). Dissonant Voices: Religious Pluralism and the Question of Truth. Grand Rapids, MI; Leicester, England: Eerdmans; Apollos. ISBN 978-0-802-80602-4. OCLC 23462887.
- ———; Moreau, A. Scott; van Engen, Charles Edward, eds. (2000). Evangelical Dictionary of World Missions. Baker Reference Library. Grand Rapids, MI; Carlisle, Cumbria, UK: aker Books; Paternoster Press. ISBN 978-0-801-02074-2. OCLC 43185799.
- ——— (2001). Encountering Religious Pluralism: the challenge to Christian faith & mission. Downers Grove, IL: InterVarsity Press. ISBN 978-0-830-81552-4. OCLC 46872173.
- ———; Ott, Craig, eds. (2006). Globalizing Theology: Belief and Practice in an Era of World Christianity. Grand Rapids, MI: Baker Academic. ISBN 978-0-801-03112-0. OCLC 63187514.
- ———; Yandell, Keith E. (2009). Buddhism: A Christian Exploration and Appraisal. Downers Grove, IL: InterVarsity Press. ISBN 978-0-830-83855-4. OCLC 313654297.
- ———; McDermott, Gerald R. (2014). A Trinitarian Theology of Religions: An Evangelical Proposal. Oxford University Press. ISBN 9780199751822. OCLC 884763103.
- ———; McDermott, Gerald R.; Muck, Terry C. (2014). Handbook of Religion: A Christian Engagement with Traditions, Teachings, and Practices. Grand Rapids, MI: Baker Academic. ISBN 978-0-801-03776-4. OCLC 861208871.
- ——— (2015). Christianity and Religious Diversity: Clarifying Christian Commitments in a Globalizing Age. Grand Rapids, MI: Baker Academic. ISBN 978-0-801-03857-0. OCLC 892879550.
- ——— (2022). Religious Experience and the Knowledge of God. Grand Rapids, MI: Baker Academic. ISBN 9780801099649. OCLC 1260170395.

=== Articles and chapters ===
- ——— (1986). "Professor Hick on Religious Pluralism". Religious Studies. 22 (2): 249–261. doi:10.1017/S0034412500018242. JSTOR 20006279.
- ——— (1987). "Exclusivism, Tolerance, and Truth". Missiology. 15 (2): 77–95. doi:10.1177/009182968701500206.
- ——— (1988). "Toward Contextualized Apologetics". Missiology. 16 (3): 289–303. doi:10.1177/009182968801600303.
- ——— (1991). "Apologetics, Worldviews, and the Problem of Neutral Criteria". Trinity Journal. 12 (1): 39–58.
- ——— (1995). "Modernity, Pluralism, and Apologetics: Implications for Missions". Evangelical Theological Society Papers. ETS-4758. Evangelical Theological Society. OCLC 37393059.
- ——— (1996). "The Question of Criteria: A Response to Mr. Perry". Calvin Theological Journal. 31 (2): 495–.
- ——— (1999). "Toward a Christian Theology of Religious Pluralism". Trinity Journal. 20 (1): 105.
- ——— (1999). "The Rationality of Belief and the Plurality of Faith: Essays in Honor of William P. Alston". Trinity Journal. 20 (2): 233.
- ——— (2002). "Religious Diversity: A Philosophical Assessment". Trinity Journal. 23 (2): 280.
- ——— (2004). "Natural Theology and Religious Diversity". Faith and Philosophy. 21 (4): 503–518. doi:10.5840/faithphil200421445.
- ——— (2005). "Theology of Religions, Missiology, and Evangelicals". Missiology. 33 (2): 141–158. doi:10.1177/009182960503300202.
- ——— (2006). "Why There Is Something Rather Than Nothing". Trinity Journal. 27 (1): 178–179.
- ——— (2006). "Moral Realism: A Defence". Trinity Journal. 27 (2): 344–348.
- ——— (2007). "An Interpretation of Religion: Human Responses to the Transcendent". Philosophia Christi. 9 (2): 476–479. doi:10.5840/pc20079239.
- ——— (2010). "The Exclusivism / Inclusivism Debate and Evangelical Missiology". Occasional Bulletin (The Evangelical Missiological Society). 23 (2): 1–3.
- ——— (2011). "Christian Mission Among Other Faiths: The Evangelical Tradition". In Pachuau, Lalsangkima; Jøgensen, Knud (eds.). Witnessing to Christ in a Pluralistic Age: Christian Mission Among Other Faiths. Regnum Edinburgh 2010 Series. London: Regnum Books. pp. 45–56. ISBN 978-1-870345-95-8.
- ———; Fields, Bruce; Sung, Elizabeth (2011). "Gaining Every Advantage: Wisdom from Intercultural Ministry". In Kilner, John (ed.). Why the Church Needs Bioethics: A Guide to Wise Engagement with Life's Challenges. Grand Rapids, MI: Zondervan. pp. 144–62. ISBN 978-0-310-32852-0.
- ——— (2012). "Evangelical Missiology and Theology of Religions: An Agenda for the Future". International Journal of Frontier Missiology. 29 (1): 5–12.
- ——— (2012). "Religious Pluralism as an Explanation for Religious Diversity". In Werther, David; Linvill, Mark D. (eds.). Philosophy and the Christian Worldview: Analysis, Assessment and Development. London: Continuum. pp. 25–49.
- ——— (2012). "If 'Personifying Evidence' is the Answer, What is the Question? A Response to Paul Moser". Philosophia Christi. 14 (2): 291–304. doi:10.5840/pc201214226.
- ——— (2013). "Can Only One Religion Be True?". In Stewart, Robert B. (ed.). Can Only One Religion Be True? Paul Knitter and Harold Netland in Dialogue. Minneapolis, MN: Fortress Press. pp. 17–54. ISBN 978-0-800-69928-4.
- ——— (2013). "Jesus is the Only Way to God". In Moreland, J. P.; Meister, Chad; Sweis, Khaldoun A. (eds.). Oxford Contemporary Dialogues. New York, NY: Oxford University Press. pp. 497–508.
- ——— (2014). "The Cape Town Commitment: Continuity and Change". In Dahle, Lars; Dahle, Margunn Serigstad; Jørgensen, Knud (eds.). The Lausanne Movement: A Range of Perspectives. Regnum Edinburgh Centenary Series. Vol. 22. Eugene, OR; London: Wipf & Stock; Regnum Books. pp. 426–438. ISBN 978-1498217224.
- ——— (2016). "Book Review: The Gentle Answer to the Muslim Accusation of Biblical Falsification". Missiology. 44 (3): 358–359. doi:10.1177/0091829616654428k.
- ——— (2017). "On Worshiping the Same God: What Exactly Is the Question?". Missiology. 45 (4): 441–456. doi:10.1177/0091829617728979.
- ——— (2023). "Précis: Religious Experience and the Knowledge of God". Philosophia Christi. 25 (2): 163–167. doi:10.5840/pc202325216.
- ——— (2023). "Experiencing God and Religious Disagreement: A Rejoinder". Philosophia Christi. 25 (2): 203–211. doi:10.5840/pc202325220.
