= Craig A. Blaising =

American writer

Craig A. Blaising Ph.D., Th.D.
- Born: 1949 (age 76–77)
- Occupations: Executive Vice President and Provost of Southwestern Baptist Theological Seminary
- Spouse: Diane
- Children: Emily, Jonathan
- Theological work
- Era: Late 20th and Early 21st Centuries
- Language: English
- Tradition or movement: Evangelical
- Main interests: Patristic Studies, Eschatology, Dispensationalism
- Notable ideas: Progressive Dispensationalism

Craig Alan Blaising (born 1949) is the former executive vice president and provost of Southwestern Baptist Theological Seminary. Blaising earned a Doctor of Theology from Dallas Theological Seminary and a Doctor of Philosophy degree at the University of Aberdeen, Scotland, a Master of Theology Dallas Theological Seminary, and a Bachelor of Science in Aerospace Engineering from the University of Texas at Austin. He is a recognized authority in patristic studies and eschatology and is one of the primary proponents of "progressive dispensationalism."

Prior to serving at Southwestern, Blaising was Joseph Emerson Brown Professor of Christian Theology and associate vice president for doctoral studies at Southern Baptist Theological Seminary. Before that, he served as professor of systematic theology at Dallas Theological Seminary. In 1978, Blaising was the first faculty member to occupy the Evangelical Bible Chair at the University of Texas at Arlington.

Blaising is a member of the Evangelical Theological Society. He was elected as the organization's national president in 2005 and served as the president of the Southwest Region in 1986–87. He is also a member of the International Association of Patristic Studies, the North American Patristics Society, and the Society of Biblical Literature.

== Works ==
=== Books ===
- Blaising, Craig A.; Darrell L. Bock (1992). Dispensationalism, Israel and the Church: The Search for Definition. Grand Rapids: Zondervan. ISBN 0-8010-2243-6.
- ———; Darrell L. Bock (1993). Progressive Dispensationalism. Wheaton, IL: Bridgepoint. ISBN 0-8010-2243-6.
- ———; Kenneth L. Gentry; Robert B. Strimple (1999). Three Views on the Millennium and Beyond. Grand Rapids: Zondervan. ISBN 0-310-20143-8.
- ———; Carmen S. Hardin, eds. (2008). Psalms 1-50. Ancient Christian Commentary on Scripture. Old Testament, vol. 7. Downers Grove, IL: InterVarsity. ISBN 978-0-8308-1477-0.
- ———; Alan Hultberg; Douglas J. Moo (2010). Three Views on the Rapture: Pretribulation, Prewrath, or Postribulation. Grand Rapids: Zondervan. ISBN 978-0-310-27720-0.

=== Journal articles ===
- ——— (1979). "Gethsemane: A Prayer of Faith". Journal of the Evangelical Theological Society. 22: 333–43.
- ——— (1981). "Chalcedon and Christology: A 1530th Anniversary". Bibliotheca Sacra. 138: 326–37.
- ——— (1988). "Developing Dispensationalism, Part 2: Development of Dispensationalism by Contemporary Dispensationalists". Bibliotheca Sacra. 145: 254–80.
- ——— (1988). "Developing Dispensationalism: Part 1: Doctrinal Development in Orthodoxy". Bibliotheca Sacra. 145: 133–40.
- ——— (1994). "Contemporary Dispensationalism". Southwestern Journal of Theology. 36: 5–13.
- ——— (1994). "Changing Patterns in American Dispensational Theology". Wesleyan Theological Journal. 29: 149–64.
- ——— (2001). "The Future of Israel as a Theological Question". Journal of the Evangelical Theological Society. 44: 435–50.
- ——— (2001). "William J. Abraham's Canon and Criterion in Christian Theology: From the Fathers to Feminism". Churchman. 115: 103–09.
- ——— (2006). "Faithfulness: A Prescription for Theology". Journal of the Evangelical Theological Society. 49: 5–16.
- ——— (2010). "The Kingdom that Comes with Jesus: Premillennialism and the Harmony of Scripture". Southern Baptist Journal of Theology. 14: 4–13.
- ——— (2010). "Creedal Formulation as Hermeneutical Development: A Re-Examination of the Nicene Creed". Pro Ecclesia. 19: 371–88. doi:10.1177/106385121001900403. S2CID 188705132.
- ———. "New Creation Eschatology and Its Ethical Implications". Perichoresis: The Theological Journal of Emanuel University. - forthcoming

=== Other contributions ===
- ——— (1985). "Malachi". In Walvoord, John F.; Zuck, Roy B. (eds.). Bible Knowledge Commentary. Wheaton, IL: Victor Books. pp. 1573–89.
- ——— (1993). "Lewis Sperry Chafer". In Elwell, Walter A. (ed.). Handbook of Evangelical Theologians. Grand Rapids, MI: Baker Academic. pp. 83–96.
- ——— (1994). "Spiritual Formation in the Early Church". In Gangel, Kenneth O.; Wilhoit, James C. (eds.). The Christian Educators Handbook on Spiritual Formation. Wheaton, IL: Victor Books. ISBN 978-1-5647-6079-1.
- ——— (2001). "Dispensationalism". In Elwell, Walter A. (ed.). Evangelical Dictionary of Theology (2nd ed.). Grand Rapids, MI: Baker Academic. pp. 343–45.
- ——— (2007). "Faithfulness: A Prescription for Theology". Quo Vadis, Evangelicalism? Perspectives on the Past, Direction for the Future: Presidential Addresses from the First Fifty Years of the Journal of the Evangelical Theological Society. Wheaton, IL: Crossway. pp. 201–16.
- ——— (2008). "The Future of Israel as a Theological Question". In Bock, Darrell L.; Glaser, Mitch (eds.). To the Jew First: The Case for Jewish Evangelism in Scripture and History. Grand Rapids, MI: Kregel. pp. 102–21.
- ——— (2016). "Biblical Hermeneutics: How Are We to Interpret the Relation Between the Tanak and the New Testament on This Question?". In McDermott, Gerald R. (ed.). The New Christian Zionism: Fresh Perspectives on Israel & the Land. Downers Grove, IL: IVP. pp. 79–105.
- Dr. Blaising has also contributed various entries in The Encyclopedia of Early Christianity, 2nd ed. (1997) and The Evangelical Dictionary of Theology (1984 and 2001).
