= Kenneth Kantzer =

American theologian and educator (1917–2002)

Kenneth S. Kantzer
- Born: March 29, 1917; Detroit, Michigan, United States
- Died: June 20, 2002 (aged 85)
- Board member of: Editor of Christianity Today

Academic background
- Education: Harvard University (PhD)
- Thesis: John Calvin’s Theory of the Knowledge of God and the Word of God (1950)

Academic work
- Discipline: Biblical studies
- Institutions: Trinity Evangelical Divinity School

Kenneth S. Kantzer (March 29, 1917 – June 20, 2002) was an American theologian and educator in the evangelical Christian tradition.

== Life and career ==
He was born in Detroit, Michigan, United States.

Kantzer, having studied at Faith Theological Seminary, Trinity Seminary and Bible College, and earned a Ph.D. in Philosophy and Religion from Harvard University (1950), was a professor of biblical and systematic theology and academic dean of Trinity Evangelical Divinity School (TEDS) from 1960 to 1978. There he helped to grow TEDS from a small denominational seminary to a major evangelical Christian graduate school with a national and international reputation.

In 1968 he also served as president of the Evangelical Theological Society. From 1977 to 1982, he was editor of Christianity Today, and, from 1982 to 1984, was president of Trinity College in Deerfield, Illinois. He later returned to Trinity Evangelical Divinity School, and helped found its Ph.D. program.

Kantzer was known as a defender of the doctrine of biblical inerrancy, attempting to articulate this doctrine in such a way as to avoid the rigidity of fundamentalist Christianity while answering the objections of Christian liberalism.

Through his teaching and his leadership at TEDS and his work at Christianity Today, Kantzer made a significant contribution to the growth of evangelicalism for more than forty years.

He died in 2002 in Victoria, Canada.

== Works ==
=== Books ===
- Kantzer, Kenneth S. (1950). John Calvin's Theory of the Knowledge of God and the Word of God (Ph.D.). Harvard, CT: Harvard University Press.
- ———, ed. (1978). Evangelical Roots: A Tribute to Wilber Smith. Nashville, TN: Thomas Nelson. OCLC 3447310.
- ———; Gundry, Stanley N., eds. (1979). Perspectives on Evangelical Theology : papers from the thirtieth annual meeting of the Evangelical Theological Society. Grand Rapids, MI: Baker Book House. ISBN 978-0-801-05413-6. OCLC 6059641.
- ———, ed. (1987). Applying the Scriptures (Summit Papers from International Council on Biblical Inerrancy Summit III, held in Chicago, Dec. 10-13, 1986). Grand Rapids, MI: Academie Books. ISBN 978-0-310-25151-4. OCLC 15489683.
- ———; Henry, Carl F. H., eds. (1990). Evangelical Affirmations. Grand Rapids, MI: Academie Books. ISBN 978-0-310-59531-1. OCLC 21583661.

=== Articles and chapters ===
- ——— (Spring 1958). "The Christology of Karl Barth". Bulletin of the Evangelical Theological Society. 1 (2): 25–28.
- ——— (1978). "Evangelicals and the Doctrine of Inerrancy". In Kantzer, Kenneth S. (ed.). Evangelical Roots. Nashville, TN: Thomas Nelson. - this chapter is an edited reprint of a chapter entitled "Evangelicals and the Inerrancy Question" - 1979

Kenneth S. Kantzer[ Kenneth Kantzer, "Evangelicals and Inerrancy"] edited reprint of a chapter entitled "" in Evangelical Roots

- ——— (April 5, 1993). "The Carl Henry That Might have Been". Christianity Today.
- ——— (June 1, 2002). "Kenneth Kantzer Reflects on His History with the Magazine and the Evangelical Movement". Christianity Today.

== Festschrift ==
- Woodbridge, John D.; McComiskey, Thomas Edward, eds. (1991). Doing Theology in Today's World: Essays in Honor of Kenneth S. Kantzer. Grand Rapids, MI: Zondervan. ISBN 978-0-310-44730-6. OCLC 23766034.
