= C. Hassell Bullock =

American Old Testament scholar

Clarence Hassell Bullock (born 1939) is an American Old Testament scholar and former president of the Evangelical Theological Society. He was a professor at Wheaton College in Illinois from 1973 until his retirement in 2009.

== Biography ==
Bullock received a B.A. in English from Samford University in Birmingham, Alabama in 1961, a B.D. from Columbia Theological Seminary in 1964, and a Ph.D. in Old Testament from the Jewish Institute of Religion at Hebrew Union College in 1970.

Bullock has served as both a pastor and a professor. He was ordained by the Presbytery of Birmingham in 1972 and served as the full-time pastor at First United Presbyterian Church of Trussville in Trussville, Alabama. He has also served as the part-time pastor at nine different churches in Illinois. As an educator, Bullock has taught at Bible and theology-related schools in seven different foreign countries, including Israel, Jamaica, Romania, and Japan. In the United States, he has also taught at Birmingham Extension Seminary and Lee College. From 1973 to 2009 he was a professor of Wheaton College, retiring in 2009 as the Franklin S. Dyrness Professor Emeritus of Biblical Studies. In 2007–08 he was president of the Evangelical Theological Society.

Bullock has been involved, either as an editor or as an author, in fifteen publications, ranging from essays to books. He has also read eleven papers at professional societies. His latest work is "Psalms 1-72" (Baker Academic, 2015).

== Published works ==
=== Books ===
- Bullock, C. Hassell (1979). An Introduction to the Poetic Books of the Old Testament: The Wisdom and Songs of Israel (1st ed.). Chicago, IL: Moody Press. ISBN 978-0-802-44144-7.
- ——— (1986). An Introduction to the Old Testament Prophetic Books (1st ed.). Chicago, IL: Moody Press. ISBN 978-0-802-44142-3. OCLC 12978488.
- ——— (1994). Method in OT Theology. Evangelical Theological Society papers. Vol. ETS-4642. Evangelical Theological Society. OCLC 33219452.
- ——— (2001). Encountering the Book of Psalms: a Literary and Theological Introduction. Encountering Biblical Studies. Grand Rapids, MI: Baker Academic. ISBN 978-0-801-02245-6.
- ——— (2015). Psalms: Volume 1. Psalms 1-72. Teach the Text Commentary Series. Grand Rapids, MI: Baker Books. ISBN 978-0-801-09197-1.
- ——— (2017). Psalms: Volume 2. Psalms 73-150. Teach the Text Commentary Series. Grand Rapids, MI: Baker Books. ISBN 978-0-801-09197-1.

=== Articles ===
- ——— (1982). "Ezekiel, Bridge Between the Testaments". Journal of the Evangelical Theological Society. 25 (1): 23–31.
- ——— (2009). "Wisdom, the 'Amen' of Torah". Journal of the Evangelical Theological Society. 52 (1): 5–18.

=== Chapters ===
- ——— (1976). "Entrée to the Pentateuch through the Prophets: a Hermeneutics of History". In Schultz, Samuel J.; Inch, Morris A. (eds.). Interpreting the Word of God: Festschrift in Honor of Steven Barabas. Chicago, IL: Moody Press. ISBN 978-0-802-44092-1.
- ——— (1981). "Interpreting the Songs of Israel : Psalm 2". In Inch, Morris A.; ——— (eds.). The Literature and Meaning of Scripture. Grand Rapids, MI: Baker Book House. ISBN 978-0-801-05032-9.
- ——— (1987). "Abortion and Old Testament Prophetic and Poetic Literature". In Hoffmeier, James K. (ed.). Abortion: a Christian Understanding and Response. Grand Rapids, MI: Baker Book House. ISBN 978-0-801-04317-8.
- ——— (1988). "The Priestly Era in the Light of Prophetic Thought". In Gileadi, Avream (ed.). Israel's Apostasy and Restoration: Essays in Honor of Roland K. Harrison. Grand Rapids, MI: Baker Book House. ISBN 978-0-801-03830-3.
- ——— (1995). "The Book of Proverbs". In Zuck, Roy B. (ed.). Learning from the Sages: Selected Studies on the Book of Proverbs. Grand Rapids, MI: Baker Book House. ISBN 978-0-801-09941-0.
- ——— (2013). "The Shape of the Torah as Reflected in the Psalter, Book 1". In Gurtner, Daniel M.; Gladd, Benjamin L. (eds.). From Creation to New Creation: Biblical Theology and Exegesis. Peabody, MA: Hendrickson Publishers. ISBN 978-1-598-56837-0.
