= Smick =

Smick is a surname. Notable people with the surname include:

- Danny Smick (1915–1975), American basketball and baseball player
- David Smick, American economic writer
- Elmer Smick (1921–1994), American theologian and professor

Other Uses

- Smick, Northern Irish slang term for chav
