= Willem A. VanGemeren =

Dutch-American theologian and academic (born 1943)

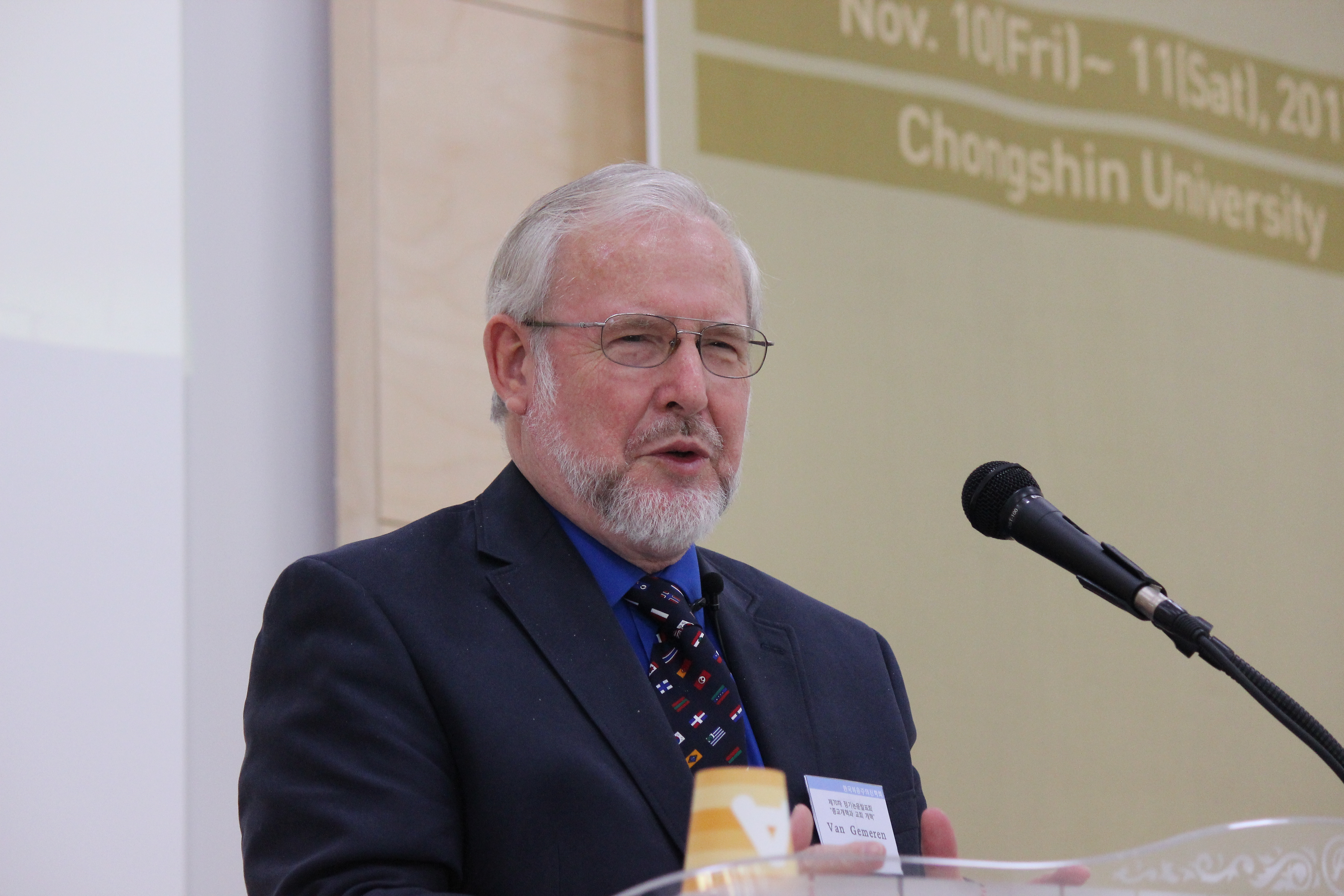
- Born: April 7, 1943; Boskoop, Netherlands
- Known for: Studies in Old Testament and Semitic Languages
- Title: Professor Emeritus

Academic background
- Education: University of Illinois (B.A.); Westminster Theological Seminary (B.D.); University of Wisconsin (Ph.D)
- Alma mater: University of Wisconsin
- Thesis: The Exegesis of Ezekiel's 'Chariot ̓chapters in Twelfth-Century Hebrew Commentaries (1974)
- Doctoral advisor: Menahem Mansoor

Academic work
- Discipline: Biblical scholar
- Sub-discipline: Old Testament and Semitic Languages
- Institutions: Trinity Evangelical Divinity School; Reformed Theological Seminary; Geneva College
- Notable works: Commentary on Psalms in the Expositor's Bible Commentary series (Zondervan)

Willem A. VanGemeren (born 7 April 1943) is professor emeritus of Old Testament and Semitic Languages at Trinity Evangelical Divinity School in Deerfield, Illinois, where he was the doctoral program director for ten years. Since 2016, he has been Distinguished Professor of Old Testament Theology at Chongshin University and Seminary in Seoul, Korea. He has been involved in education since 1974 and has taught and preached in a number of countries.

VanGemeren is the author of several publications, including Interpreting the Prophetic Word and a commentary on Psalms in the Expositor's Bible Commentary series. He was a senior editor of the five-volume work The New International Dictionary of Old Testament Theology and Exegesis in which ten essays were compiled to explain hermeneutics and Biblical interpretation. He is a member of the Society of Biblical Literature, the Evangelical Theological Society, and the Institute for Biblical Research.

== Life and education ==
VanGemeren was born to Jacobus Johannes Van Gemeren and Sarah Cornelia Langeveld in Boskoop, Netherlands, during World War II, and moved to the United States in 1962.

VanGemeren studied at Moody Bible Institute in Chicago and earned a BA from University of Illinois. He finished a BD in theology at Westminster Theological Seminary and studied as a graduate student in Hebrew University in Jerusalem. He earned MA and PhD degrees in the field of Old Testament at the University of Wisconsin. VanGemeren taught at Geneva College and Reformed Theological Seminary for eighteen years, and taught at Trinity Evangelical Divinity School.

== Selected publications ==
=== Books ===
- VanGemeren, Willem A. (1988). The Progress of Redemption: The Story of Salvation From Creation to the New Jerusalem. Grand Rapids: Zondervan. ISBN 0-8010-2081-6.
- VanGemeren, Willem A. (1990). Interpreting the Prophetic Word. Grand Rapids: Zondervan. ISBN 0310211387.
- VanGemeren, Willem A. (1990). "Psalms". In Frank E. Gaebelein (ed.). Expositor's Bible Commentary. Grand Rapids: Zondervan. ISBN 978-0-310-53184-5.

=== Editorial Work: Academic Resources ===
The New International Dictionary of Old Testament Theology and Exegesis. Grand Rapids: Zondervan, 1997. Translated into Arabic and Portuguese. ISBN 031049950X.

Guide to Old Testament Theology and Exegesis. Grand Rapids: Zondervan, 1999. ISBN 0310231930.

=== Chapters Contributed to Edited Works ===
(1988). Systems of Continuity. In: J. Feinberg, ed., Continuity and Discontinuity: Perspectives on the Relationship between the Old and New Testaments in Honor of S. Lewis Johnson, Jr.. Westchester: Crossway, pp. 37–62. ISBN 0891074686.

(1992). Israel and the Church: A Response. In Craig Blaising and Darrell Bock eds., Dispensationalism, Israel and the Church. Grand Rapids: Zondervan. ISBN 0310346118.

(1993) The Law is the Perfection of Righteousness in Jesus Christ - a Reformed Perspective. In Wayne Strickland ed., Five Views on the Law, the Gospel, and the Christian Life. Grand Rapids: Zondervan. Now published as Five Views of Law and Gospel. Grand Rapids: Zondervan, 1996. ISBN 0310212715.

(1995). Oracles of Salvation. In Brent Sandy and Ronald L. Giese eds., Cracking Old Testament Codes: A Guide to Interpreting the Literary Genres of the Old Testament. Nashville: Broadman and Holman, pp. 139–55. ISBN 0805410937.

(2011) Our Missional God: Redemptive Historical Preaching and the Missio Dei. In Jason Van Vliet ed., Living Waters from Ancient Springs: Essays in Honor of Cornelis Van Dam. Eugene, Oregon: Pickwick, pp. 198–217. ISBN 1608999491.

(2011) with Andrew Abernethy. The Spirit of God and the Future. In David G. Firth and Paul D. Wegner eds., Presence, Power, and Promise: The Role of the Spirit of God in the Old Testament. Downers Grove: InterVarsity Press, pp. 321–45. ISBN 1844745341.

(2012) with Jason Stanghelle. Psalms Superscriptions and Critical Realistic Interpretation of the Psalms. In James K. Hoffemeier and Dennis R. Magary eds., Do Historical Matters matter to Faith?: A Critical Appraisal of Modern and Postmodern Approaches to Scripture. Wheaton: Crossway, pp. 281–302. ISBN 1433525712.

(2013) Entering the Textual World of the Psalms: Literary Analysis. In Andrew J. Schmutzer and David M. Howard eds., The Psalms: Language for all Seasons of the Soul. Chicago: Moody Publishers, pp. 29–48. ISBN 0802409628.

(2015) God's Faithfulness, Human Suffering, and the Concluding Hallel Psalms (146–150): A Canonical Study. In Gregg R. Allison and Stephen J. Wellum, eds., Building on the Foundations of Evangelical Theology: Essays in Honor of John S. Feinberg. Wheaton: Crossway, pp. 263–84. ISBN 1433538172.

=== Contributions to Study Bibles ===
Geneva Study Bible. Nashville: Thomas Nelson, 1995. ISBN 0840710917.

NKJV Study Bible. Nashville: Thomas Nelson, 1998. ISBN 0840715994.

Notes on "Psalms" and "Isaiah" in The New Living Translation. Carol Stream, IL : Tyndale, 2008. ISBN 1496416651.

Notes on "Genesis" in Gospel Transformation Bible. Wheaton, IL: Crossway, 2012. ISBN 1433538679.

=== Journal and Periodical Articles ===
"Was Jesus Born in Nazareth?" The Presbyterian Guardian, Vol. 41 (Dec. 1972). PDF

"The Sons of God in Genesis 6:1‑4," Westminster Theological Journal 43 (1981), 320‑348.

"Psalm CXXXI: K^{e}g~mûl: The Problem of Meaning and Metaphor," Hebrew Studies, 23 (1982), 51‑57. Link to JSTOR Preview

"Israel as the Hermeneutical Crux in the Interpretation of Prophecy: Part I." Westminster Theological Journal 45 (1983) 132‑145.

"Israel as the Hermeneutical Crux in the Interpretation of Prophecy: Part II." Westminster Theological Journal 46 (1984) 254‑297.

"The Spirit of Restoration." Westminster Theological Journal 50 (1988), 81–102.

"Caleb - Ready to Follow God's Orders." Decision. July–August 1988, 31–33.

"`Abba' -- in the Old Testament?" Journal of the Evangelical Theological Society 31.4 (1988), 385–98. PDF

"Prophets, the Freedom of God, and Hermeneutics," Westminster Theological Journal 52 (1990), 79–99. Full-Text HTML.

"The Covenant is a Framework for Life and Family," Modern Reformation, March/April 1995, 7–10.

"The Prophets: Annotated Bibliography." Ministry Magazine. Tyranno Press (Korean), October 1999-March 2001.

“Daniel 9: The Problem of Interpreting the Seventy Weeks,” Ministry Magazine. Tyranno Press (Korean), June 2002.

”Kenosis, The Beauty of the Cross, and the Challenge of Social Justice in a Secular Age." (Lecture presented to the Korea Evangelical Theological Society, November 2015).

“Christocentricity and Appropriation in Calvin’s Exposition of Daniel,” Torch Trinity Journal 19:2016, 223–54.
