= Gilbert H. Johnson =

American evangelical seminary professor (1904–1994)

Gilbert Hartshorn Johnson (March 19, 1904 – October 10, 1994) was an American evangelical seminary professor who was instrumental in developing Alliance Theological Seminary. Johnson served as professor of theology and director of the Christian service department at Nyack College, and was the author of The Pilgrimage of Joseph Douglas Williams: A Brief Portrayal of His Life (1952), and the JETS article "The Outreach Of Theological Education" (1960).

== Early life and education ==
Johnson was born in Brooklyn, New York in 1904 and was married in 1925 to Ida Goodman. He graduated from the Missionary Training Institute at Nyack and earned his Th.B. from Gordon College and B.Div from Gordon Conwell Theological Seminary. In 1964, he was awarded an honorary LL.D. from Wheaton College.

== Career ==
Johnson served as a pastor in Dover, New Jersey, Owen Sound, Ontario, and Brockton, Massachusetts before joining the faculty in 1940 of what became Nyack College. There he served as chair of the division of Bible and theology and later as vice president. In 1959, he served a term as president of the Evangelical Theological Society. From 1960 to 1971 he served as Secretary of Education for the Christian and Missionary Alliance.
