= Bouma (surname) =

Bouma is a West Frisian surname. Notable people with the surname include:

- nl:Arnold Bouma (1932–2011), Dutch geologist
  - The Bouma sequence in sedimentology is named after him
- Clarence Bouma (1891–1962), Dutch-born American theologian and professor
- Gary Bouma (1942–2021), American-born Australian professor of sociology
- Herman Bouma (born 1934), Dutch vision researcher and gerontechnologist
- Johan Bouma (born 1940), Dutch soil scientist
- Johannes Lützen Bouma (1934–2025), Dutch economist
- Lance Bouma (born 1990), Canadian ice hockey centre
- Nicole Bouma (born 1981), Canadian voice actress
- Thijs Bouma (born 1992), Dutch footballer
- Wilfred Bouma (born 1978), Dutch footballer

== See also ==
- 9706 Bouma, asteroid, named after Dutch amateur astronomer Reinder J. Bouma (born 1949)
