= James A. Borland =

American evangelical professor of biblical studies and theology

James Allen Borland (born July 11, 1944) is an American evangelical professor of biblical studies and theology at Liberty University and former president of the Evangelical Theological Society.

== Biography ==
Borland was born on July 11, 1944, in Santa Monica, California. He earned his B.A. (1966) from Los Angeles Baptist College, his M.Div (1969) from Los Angeles Baptist Theological Seminary, his Th.M. (1971) from Talbot Theological Seminary, and his Th.D. (1976) from Grace Theological Seminary. While he was in seminary, he served as pastor of Stonehurst Community Chapel in California. He taught for a year at Central Baptist Theological Seminary of Minneapolis, and for three years at Maranatha Baptist Bible College in Wisconsin, before joining the faculty of Liberty in 1977, where he still teaches full-time in 2014. During this time, Borland also served as pastor of two different local churches, Grace Bible Church in Madison Heights, and Berean Baptist Church in Lynchburg. He has also served as a member of the executive New Testament translation committee for the 1984 revision of the New King James Version and is a founding member of the Council on Biblical Manhood and Womanhood. Borland was a member of the executive committee of the Evangelical Theological Society for more than twenty years, serving as the society's president in 1989 and secretary-treasurer from 1992 until 2009. In 2011, he was elected to the Board of Supervisors for Campbell County

== Publications ==
=== Books ===
- Christ in the Old Testament (1978), ISBN 1845506278
- A General Introduction to the New Testament (1986) ISBN 0936461055
- Old Testament Life & Literature (1989) ISBN 0936461020
- Lectures on Bible Prophecy (1990) ISBN 0936461039
- The Gospel of Matthew: The King Is Coming with Ed Hindson, in the Twenty-First Century Biblical Commentary Series (2007) ISBN 0899578233

=== Articles ===
- "The Gospel of Luke" and "The Epistle to Philemon" in the Liberty Commentary on the New Testament (1980)
- "The Book of Exodus", "The Book of Leviticus", "The Book of Daniel" and in the Liberty Commentary on the Old Testament (1982)
- "Re-examining New Testament Textual-Critical Principles and Practices Used to Negate Inerrancy" (1982), JETS
- "J Gresham Machen: Valiant for Truth" (1983), Fundamentalist Journal
- "Mordecai Ham : A Thorn in the Devil's Side" (1984), Fundamentalist Journal
- "Can We Avoid In-Law Problems" (1984), Fundamentalist Journal
- "The Mystery of Marriage: As Iron Sharpens Iron" (1986), Fundamentalist Journal
- "A Theologian Looks at the Gospel and World Religions" (1990), JETS
- "Women in the Life and Teachings of Jesus" (1991), Recovering Biblical Manhood and Womanhood
- "The Preservation of the New Testament Text: a Common Sense Approach" (1999), The Master's Seminary Journal
- "Exploring Protestant Traditions: An Invitation to Hospitality" (2007), JETS
