= Gilbert Esau =

American politician

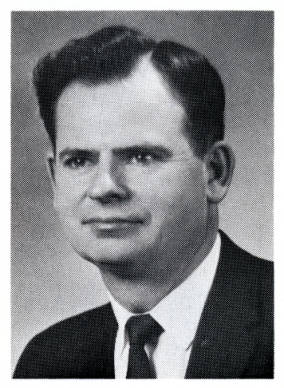

Member of the Minnesota House of Representatives from the 18A district
- In office January 8, 1963 – January 6, 1969
- Preceded by: Sam Franz
- Succeeded by: George Mann

Member of the Minnesota House of Representatives from the 28A district
- In office January 2, 1973 – January 3, 1983
- Preceded by: George Mann
- Succeeded by: George Mann

Personal details
- Born: Gilbert Donald Esau; October 31, 1919 Mountain Lake, Minnesota, US
- Died: July 16, 2012 (aged 92) Spirit Lake, Iowa, US
- Party: Republican Party of Minnesota
- Spouse: Carol (Herman) Esau
- Children: 5
- Occupation: Business owner, politician, veteran, lay pastor

Gilbert Donald Esau (October 31, 1919 – July 16, 2012) was a Minnesota politician and a member of the Minnesota House of Representatives from southwestern Minnesota. First elected in 1962, Esau was re-elected in 1964, 1966 and 1968. After sitting out for four years, he opted to run again in 1972, was elected and was re-elected in 1974, 1976, 1978 and 1980.

== Background ==
From the town of Mountain Lake, Esau, was an automobile garage and body repair shop owner. He served in the United States Army during World War II, being deployed in both the European and Asiatic theatres between 1941 and 1945. Prior to being elected to the Minnesota Legislature, he was a member of the Mountain Lake Village Council from 1954-1963.

== Service in the Minnesota House ==
Esau represented the old District 18A and, later, 28A, which included all or portions of Brown, Cottonwood, Jackson, Murray and Redwood counties, changing somewhat after the 1972 legislative redistricting. He was, along with senators Dennis Frederickson, Earl Renneke and Jim Vickerman, and representatives Aubrey Dirlam, George Mann, Henry Kalis and Wendell Erickson, one of the longest-serving legislators from southern Minnesota in the state's history.

While in the legislature, Esau earned a reputation as a strong advocate for farmers, and as a leader on issues relevant to criminal justice and education. He allied with the Conservative Caucus at a time when the legislature was still officially nonpartisan, and later identified as a Republican when party affiliation became required of candidates.

Esau served on the House Agriculture, Criminal Justice, Education, General Legislation, Health & Welfare, Transportation and Veterans & Military Affairs committees, and on various other committee incarnations and subcommittees during his nearly 20 years in office.

== Active retirement ==
Esau was active and visible in his community, occasionally commenting on issues of interest and note in the local media. His Christian service work included frequent mission trips to such places as Ukraine (his father’s birthplace), Russia, Paraguay, Peru, and the Philippines.

In 2009, Esau authored a memoir detailing his military service with the U.S. Army in both the Asian and European theatres during World War II, entitled My World War II Memories. A series of interviews with him were also conducted to document his experiences as a World War II serviceman. These interviews can be found on YouTube.

Esau died on July 16, 2012.
