= Samuel J. Schultz =

American Old Testament scholar and professor

Samuel Jacob Schultz (9 June 1914 – 24 June 2005) was an American Old Testament scholar. He was a professor at Wheaton College, Illinois, from 1949 to 1980, and an emeritus professor from 1980.

Samuel Jacob Schultz was born in Mountain Lake, Minnesota, and studied at Bethel College and Harvard Divinity School. He taught at Gordon College, Bethel College and St. Paul Bible College before going to Wheaton. He was an ordained minister, and was a member successively of the Christian & Missionary Alliance, the Baptist General Conference and the Conservative Congregational Christian Conference.

Schulz wrote The Old Testament Speaks (1960), as well as the Leviticus and Deuteronomy volumes of the Everyman's Bible Commentary series. He was editor of Journal of the Evangelical Theological Society from 1962 to 1975.

In 1983 a Festschrift was published in his honor. The Living and Active Word of God: Studies in Honor of Samuel J. Schultz included essays by F. F. Bruce, Millard Erickson, Norman Geisler, Walter Kaiser, Harold Lindsell, Merrill Tenney, and Ronald Youngblood.
