= S. Lewis Johnson =

American pastor and theologian (1915 – 2004)

- Born: Samuel Lewis Johnson Jr. September 13, 1915; Birmingham, Alabama
- Died: January 28, 2004 (aged 88); Dallas, Texas
- Occupation: Professor of New Testament
- Known for: moderate dispensationalism
- Spouse: Mary Sibley (nee McCormack))
- Children: Samuel & Grace

Academic background
- Education: College of Charleston
- Alma mater: Dallas Theological Seminary (PhD)
- Thesis: Survey of Biblical Psychology in Romans (1949)

Academic work
- Discipline: Biblical studies
- Sub-discipline: NT studies
- Main interests: Greek, Hebrew, and systematic theology

Samuel Lewis Johnson Jr. (September 13, 1915 – January 28, 2004), was an American conservative evangelical pastor and theologian, was for many years a professor at Dallas Theological Seminary. Johnson was a moderate dispensationalist and a Five-point Calvinist in his soteriology. He was a Biblical scholar and theologian of "rare abilities" and of international renown.

== Life ==
Johnson was born in Birmingham, Alabama and grew up in Charleston, SC, graduating from College of Charleston with an A. B. degree in 1937. Afterwards he moved back to Birmingham, entered his father's insurance business and married Mary Sibley McCormack. He was converted in Birmingham, while in the insurance business, through the teaching of Dr. Donald Grey Barnhouse. He left the insurance business in 1943 to enter Dallas Theological Seminary, from which he received a Th.M. (1946) and a Th.D. (1949).

Upon graduation he became a professor at Dallas Theological Seminary, where he taught Greek, Hebrew, and systematic theology for 21 years (1950 to 1977). After retiring from Dallas Seminary, he became Professor of Biblical and Systematic Theology at Trinity Evangelical Divinity School in Deerfield, Illinois from 1980 to 1985, as well as serving as a visiting professor of New Testament at Grace Theological Seminary, Winona Lake, Indiana. From 1985 to 1993 he served as a visiting professor of Systematic Theology at Tyndale Theological Seminary in Badhoevedorp, Amsterdam, Netherlands.

During his years of ministry he was a guest speaker at Bible conferences in Canada, Mexico, Guatemala, Australia, Jamaica, and Europe. Publications include, The Old Testament in the New, (1980), as well as numerous periodical articles, especially in Bibliotheca Sacra (published by Dallas Seminary). He was on the translation committees for The Berkeley Bible and The New International Version and contributor to Recovering Biblical Manhood and Womanhood (Crossway Books, 1991).

He was also engaged in pastoral ministry for over forty years. He served as pastor of Independent Presbyterian Church (1951–1954), which later became Northwest Bible Church, pastor of Grace Bible Church (1954–1958), and as an elder and minister at Believers Chapel (1963–1993) all in Dallas. Lewis Johnson died on January 28, 2004.

== Works ==
=== Books ===
- Johnson, S. Lewis (1949). Survey of Biblical Psychology in Romans (Th.D.). Dallas, TX: Dallas Theological Seminary. OCLC 15375044.
- ——— (1967). An Expositor's New Testament library. Dallas, TX: Dallas Theological Seminary. OCLC 5000168. - date uncertain
- ——— (1980). The Old Testament in the New: an argument for biblical inspiration. Contemporary Evangelical Perspectives. Grand Rapids, MI: Zondervan. ISBN 978-0-310-41851-1. OCLC 6087496.
- ——— (1980). Sermons on Genesis: preached at Believers Chapel, Dallas Texas. Believers Bible Bulletin. Dallas, TX: Dallas Theological Seminary. OCLC 665988749.
- ——— (1981). The Gospel of John. Dallas, TX: Believers Chapel. OCLC 35184812.
- ——— (2014). Discovering Romans: spiritual revival for the soul. adapted by Mike Abendroth. Grand Rapids, MI: Zondervan. ISBN 978-0-310-51542-5. OCLC 874734194.
- ———. Bibliography for New Testament Exegesis and Exposition. Dallas, TX: Dallas Theological Seminary. OCLC 7390415. - of unknown date

=== Articles and chapters ===
- ——— (1991). "Role Distinctions in the Church: Galatians 3:28". In Piper, John; Grudem, Wayne (eds.). Recovering Biblical Manhood and Womanhood: A Response to Evangelical Feminism. Wheaton, IL: Crossway Books. ISBN 978-0-891-07586-8. OCLC 22629898.

== Festschrift ==
- Feinberg, John S., ed. (1988). Continuity and Discontinuity: perspectives on the relationship between the Old and New Testaments: essays in honor of S. Lewis Johnson, Jr. Westchester, IL: Crossway Books. ISBN 978-0-891-07490-8. OCLC 21595815.
