= J. Barton Payne =

American Old Testament scholar

John Barton Payne (12 September 1922 – 5 July 1979) was an American Old Testament scholar.

Payne taught at Wheaton College and Trinity Evangelical Divinity School before becoming professor of Old Testament at Covenant Theological Seminary. He wrote a number of books, including The Theology of the Older Testament (Zondervan, 1962) – which Christianity Today noted was "the only work of its kind to be produced by an American conservative scholar in two generations" – and Encyclopedia of Biblical Prophecy (Hodder and Stoughton, 1973). Payne served as president of the Evangelical Theological Society in 1966.

Payne died in a climbing accident in Japan in 1979.
