= Archaeological Study Bible =

2005 book about biblical architecture

Archaeological Study Bible: An Illustrated Walk Through Biblical History
- Publisher: Zondervan
- Publication date: 2004
- ISBN: 9780310926054

Archaeological Study Bible: An Illustrated Walk Through Biblical History, first published in 2005 by Zondervan (ISBN 9780310926054), is a study Bible with reference materials that highlight archaeological, historical, and cultural research related to various passages.

== Overview ==
Archaeological Study Bible uses the New International Version translation of the Bible text and was edited by Walter Kaiser, Jr. and Duane Garrett.

It has been noted as surpassing Zondervan's NIV Study Bible which had been the top-selling study Bible for more than twenty years, and was awarded the 2007 Gold Medallion Book Award for Bibles.
