= John Basinger =

American actor and writer (1934–2026)

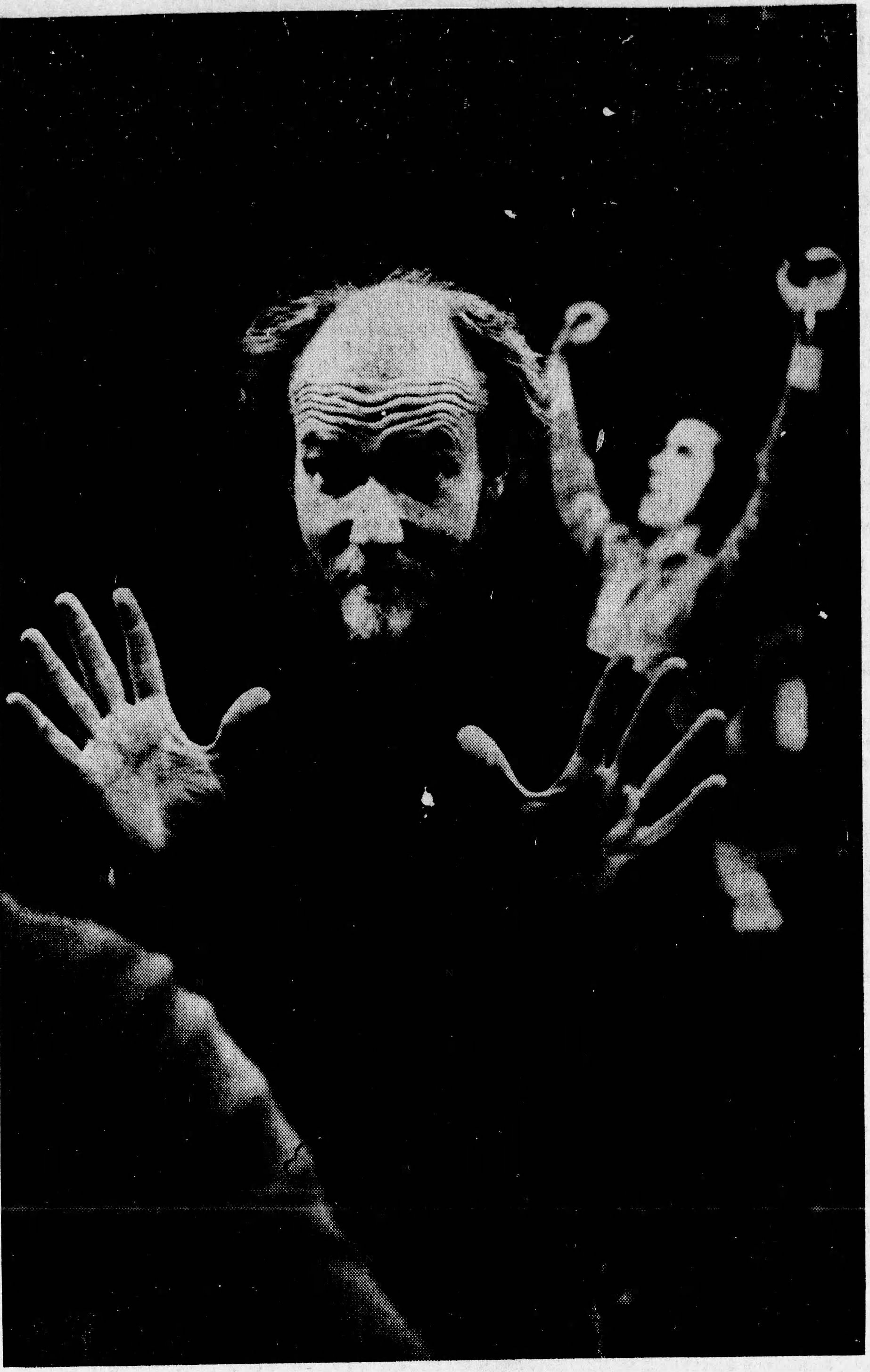
- Basinger in 1970
- Born: Peter Reese; May 10, 1934; Chicago, Illinois, U.S.
- Died: May 29, 2026 (aged 92); Brookings, South Dakota, U.S.
- Occupations: Actor; writer; educator
- Spouse: Jeanine Basinger (m. 1967)
- Children: 1

John Peter Basinger (born Peter Reese; May 10, 1934 – May 29, 2026) was an American actor, writer and educator. He is believed to be the only person to have memorized all twelve books of Paradise Lost by John Milton.

== Early life and education ==
Basinger was born Peter Reese on May 10, 1934, at a Salvation Army hospital in Chicago to Marguerite Reese, an unmarried German immigrant. Basinger spent his early years in foster homes. He was adopted at age 13 by Harvey Basinger, a physician, and Marie Enns Basinger of Mountain Lake, Minnesota, who renamed him John Peter Basinger.

He graduated from Bluffton College in 1956 with degrees in biology and mathematics. After college, he taught at the Kakamega School in Kenya for five years, where he became fluent in Swahili. After returning to the United States, he earned a master's degree in teaching and theatre at Wesleyan University.

== Career ==
In 1968, Basinger became active in National Theatre of the Deaf, acting in the award-winning 1977 performance of Under Milk Wood, for which he also composed the music. Although he was not deaf, he learned American Sign Language and remained a core member of the troupe for decades. Basinger also appeared in the film adaptation of Children of a Lesser God, as well as various independent films.

From 1973 to 1993, Basinger taught speech, sign language and theater at Wesleyan and Connecticut State Community College, where a theater was named after him.

In 2012, Basinger's one-man adaptation of King Lear (The King) premiered in Waterford, Connecticut. He was active in the arts community of Middletown, Connecticut, and was honored with a John Basinger Day.

=== Memorization of Paradise Lost ===
In 1993, after his retirement from teaching, he began memorizing all twelve books of Milton's Paradise Lost. He developed a daily regimen in which he memorized seven new lines while riding an exercise bike and reviewed fourteen previously memorized lines while lifting weights. The poem comprises 10,565 lines, or more than 60,000 words. Basinger estimated that he spent between 3,000 and 4,000 hours over a period of eight years and ten months memorizing the entire work. In December 2001, he performed the complete poem over three days at a theater in Norwich, Connecticut. He subsequently toured the United States performing individual books and excerpts. He described the work as "a cathedral I carry around in my mind, a place that I can enter and walk around at will."

His achievement attracted scholarly attention. In 2010, psychologists John Seamon, Paawan Punjabi and Emily Busch cited Basinger's accomplishment in the journal Memory as evidence that exceptional memorization skills can be acquired later in life through sustained practice rather than innate ability.

== Personal life and death ==
Basinger married film historian Jeanine Basinger (née Deyling) in 1967 after the two met at Wesleyan University. They were married for 59 years, up until John's death in 2026, and had one daughter. He died on May 29, 2026, from complications of pneumonia in Brookings, South Dakota, at the age of 92.
