= Walter A. Elwell =

American theologian (1937–2025)

- Born: April 29, 1937; Miami, Florida, U.S.
- Died: March 4, 2025 (aged 87); Cedar Rapids, Iowa, U.S.
- Occupation: Biblical academic
- Title: Professor emeritus of Bible and Theology at Wheaton College
- Spouse: Barbara (Eichmann/Dismeier)

Academic background
- Education: Wheaton College, University of Chicago and University of Tübingen
- Alma mater: University of Edinburgh (Ph.D.)

Academic work
- Discipline: Biblical studies
- Institutions: Wheaton College
- Main interests: Popular theology
- Notable works: Evangelical Dictionary of Theology

Walter Alexander Elwell (April 29, 1937 – March 4, 2025) was an American evangelical theological academic. He taught at Wheaton College, Illinois from 1975 to 2003 before retiring and being named professor emeritus of Bible and Theology. He was also noted as an editor of many reference works about the Bible.

Elwell was educated at Wheaton College where he earned his B.A. and M.A. He was awarded his Ph.D. in 1970 from the University of Edinburgh after spending time at, then attended the University of Chicago and University of Tübingen. He consulted for both the Evangelical Christian Publishers Association and the Evangelical Book Club. He was also a member of the Society of Biblical Literature, Institute for Biblical Research, Evangelical Theological Society, and Chicago Society of Biblical Research. He has taught Greek at North Park College in Chicago, Illinois and a professor of Bible at Belhaven College in Jackson, Mississippi.

Elwell was born in Miami, Florida, United States and was married to Barbara Jean Elwell. Elwell died on March 4, 2025, at the age of 87.

== Selected works ==
=== Books ===
- Elwell, Walter A., ed. (1989). The Concise Dictionary of the Christian Tradition. Grand Rapids: Zondervan.
- ——, ed. (1991). Baker Topical Guide to the Bible: New International Version. Baker Reference Library. Grand Rapids: Baker Academic.
- ——, ed. (1996). Evangelical Dictionary of Biblical Theology. Grand Rapids: Baker Academic.
- ——, ed. (1997). Baker Encyclopedia of the Bible (4 vols). Grand Rapids: Baker Academic.
- ——; Yarbrough, Robert W. (1998). Readings from the First-Century World: Primary Sources for New Testament Study. Baker Academic.
- ——, ed. (2001). Evangelical Dictionary of Theology. Baker Reference Library (2nd ed.). Grand Rapids: Baker Academic. ISBN 978-0-801-02075-9. - first published 1984
- ——, ed. (2001). Baker Commentary on the Bible. Baker Reference Library. Grand Rapids: Baker Academic.
- ——, ed. (2001). Baker Theological Dictionary of the Bible. Baker Reference Library. Grand Rapids: Baker Academic.
- ——; Yarbrough, Robert W. (2005). Encountering the New Testament: A Historical and Theological Survey (2nd ed.). Baker Academic.
- ——; Comfort, Philip W., eds. (2008). Tyndale Bible Dictionary. Tyndale Reference Library. Carol Stream, IL: Tyndale House Publishers.
- ——, ed. (2012). Topical Analysis of the Bible: A Survey of Essential Christian Doctrines. Peabody, MA: Hendrickson Publishers. ISBN 978-1-6197-0026-0.
