= Ronald F. Youngblood =

American biblical scholar and professor

Ronald F. Youngblood (August 10, 1931 – July 5, 2014) was an American biblical scholar and professor of Old Testament. In addition to being one of the original translators of the New International Version of the Bible, he was the general editor for Nelson's New Illustrated Bible Dictionary, and on the editorial team for the Zondervan NASB Study Bible, both of which earned the ECPA Christian Book Award for their respective publication years.

== Background and education ==
Youngblood was born in Chicago in 1931. He earned his B.A. from Valparaiso University (1952), his B.D. from Fuller Theological Seminary (1955), and his Ph.D. from the Dropsie College for Hebrew and Cognate Learning (1961). He was ordained in 1958 at Oxford Circle Baptist Church in Philadelphia. He died on July 5, 2014.

== Career ==
Youngblood has been most closely associated with Bethel Seminary, first teaching at the St. Paul campus (1961–1978) and later at the San Diego campus (1982–2001).

Youngblood first joined the New International Version (NIV) translation team in 1970, and was invited to join the Committee on Bible Translation in 1976, a few years prior to its first complete publication in 1978. He continued to serve as a translator for the first major revision in 1984, and was executive editor for the New International Reader's Version (1995, 1998). Later, he played a significant role in the development of Today's New International Version.

He has also served as chairman of the board of the International Bible Society, and editor of the Journal of the Evangelical Theological Society (1976–1998).

In 2003, a Festschrift was published in his honor. The challenge of Bible translation: communicating God's Word to the world : essays in honor of Ronald F. Youngblood included contributions from D.A. Carson, Dick France, Andreas J. Köstenberger, Douglas J. Moo, Moisés Silva, Mark L. Strauss, and Bruce K. Waltke.

== Selected publications ==
- The Heart of the Old Testament: A Survey of Key Theological Themes (1971, 1998) ISBN 0-8010-2172-3
- The Genesis Debate: Persistent Questions about Creation and the Flood (1986) ISBN 0-8407-7517-2
- Books of Samuel in the Expositor's Bible Commentary series (1992) ISBN 0-310-60893-7
- Nelson's New Illustrated Bible Dictionary, with F. F. Bruce and R. K. Harrison (1995) ISBN 0-8407-2071-8
- In progress: Evangelical Exegetical Commentary: Judges & Ruth. Bellingham, WA: Logos Bible Software.
