= Harold B. Kuhn =

American professor, minister, and humanitarian

Harold Barnes Kuhn (August 21, 1911 – August 15, 1994) was an American professor of philosophy of religion, minister, and humanitarian. As a faculty member at Asbury Theological Seminary, he founded the Asbury Seminarian, which he edited from 1946 to 1978. In 1955, he served a term as president of the Evangelical Theological Society.

== Background and education ==
Kuhn was born August 21, 1911, in Belleville, Kansas, to John W. Kuhn and wife. He was a member of the Ohio Yearly Meeting, part of the holiness Quakers. Kuhn graduated in 1934 from what was then Cleveland Bible College (now Malone University), and went on to earn his bachelor degree from what was then John Fletcher College (later Vennard College), and his STB, STM and PhD from Harvard Divinity School (1944).

== Academic career ==
Kuhn taught at Asbury Theological Seminary from 1944 until 1982, serving 18 years as chairman of the Division of Biblical Studies.
