= Orlando J. Heinitz =

American politician and businessman (1921–2007)

Orlando Jacob Heinitz (August 27, 1921 – October 10, 2007) was an American politician and businessman.

Henitz was born in Mountain Lake, Minnesota and graduated from Mountain Lake High School. He served in the United States Army during World War II. Heinitz received his bachelor's degree from the University of Minnesota in economics and personal psychology. Heinitz was an employment counselor and was involved with the real estate business. Heinitz, his wife, and family lived in Wayzata, Minnesota. He served in the Minnesota House of Representatives from 1969 to 1985 and was a Republican. In 1986, he and his wife moved to Green Valley, Arizona. Heinitz died in Green Valley, Arizona.
