= John D. Robb =

John Robb is the former chairman for the International Prayer Council, and formerly led the prayer ministries of World Vision. The IPC is a network of regional and national prayer ministries and networks around the world. He and the IPC provided leadership for the World Prayer Assembly that was held in Jakarta, Indonesia, May 14–18, 2012.

He continues to chair the Transformation Prayer Foundation, helps to convene the National Prayer Assembly (USA) and is involved with other national and international prayer, humanitarian and mission efforts.

Robb has also served as a field missionary, pastor, seminary teacher, researcher, and author. He has led three international mission and prayer movements: the AD2000 and Beyond Movement’s Unreached Peoples Track, the Great Commission Roundtable, and the International Prayer Council.

== Career ==
During his work with World Vision, Robb traveled throughout the world and led consultations and seminars for national Christian leaders and World Vision staff in more than 100 countries. He organized and led interdenominational prayer initiatives in over 60 of these nations.

"Working with a large cross-section of Los Angeles Christian leadership, he also founded LIFT (Lifting Intercession for Transformation), an annual prayer effort for the churches of Southern California during the late 1990s and was instrumental in the development of the Hollywood Transformation Coalition, a prayer and mission network for Hollywood and the entertainment industry."

For several years, he also served as a guest lecturer at Fuller Seminary School of World Mission.

== International Prayer Council and International Prayer Connect ==
John Robb is the former chairman for the International Prayer Council and served as International Facilitator of the World Prayer Assembly.

"The IPC focuses on global issues of common concern to the Body of Christ such as war, terrorism, HIV/AIDS, and other humanitarian issues as well as on the fulfillment of the Great Commandment and the completion of the Great Commission. He and his colleagues helped to launch and support the Global Day of Prayer that has helped unite over 300 million Christians in more than 200 nations to pray for the transformation of our world.

In 2006, 2008 and 2013, the IPC organized and led the Global Children in Prayer Consultations with CiP practitioners taking part from over 50 nations.

In 2007, the IPC brought together over 400 prayer leaders and intercessors for the first international prayer initiative for the United Nations ...(see below). This was followed by similar initiatives inside the U.N. in 2009 and 2013 that connected hundreds of ministry leaders, intercessors and children and youth along with ambassadors and UN officials to pray for the nations of the world, the needs of youth and children and other global concerns.

In close cooperation with the Indonesian and Korean prayer movements, the IPC initiated and facilitated the World Prayer Assembly in 2012 in Jakarta, Indonesia. 9500 ministry leaders and intercessors from 86 nations took part. During the WPA, over 100,000 prayed together in Indonesia's national stadium connected live to 378 other cities in the nation with an estimated 2 million participating. The Global Day of Prayer and God TV along with Internet streaming connected tens of millions more around the world in what has been called "the largest prayer meeting in history".

The IPC along with other ministries and networks also helped catalyze the Uprising international youth prayer movement, starting with a World Youth Prayer Assembly held in 2016.

=== International Prayer Initiative for the United Nations and Global Cities ===
The International Prayer Council led this initiative, and on September 8–12, 2009, over 600 international prayer leaders and intercessors including New York and US prayer and ministry leaders, UN ambassadors and staff as well as children and youth from 60 plus countries, took part in the initiative.

== Education ==
- History (B.A.) - Yale University
- East Asian studies (M.S.) - Yale University
- Missions and Biblical Studies (M.Div.) - Trinity Evangelical Divinity School
- Post-graduate studies - Fuller Seminary School of World Mission.

== Works ==
- upcoming Praying Dangerously: Adventures in Trusting God to Transform Our World! describes some of the wonders of God he has been privileged to witness through prayer initiatives in hurting areas of our world.
- co-author with Jim Hill, The Peacemaking Power of Prayer and edited Transform Your World through Prayer: Lessons on Strategic Intercession from South Asia published in India, Broadman & Holman Publishers (May 15, 2000). ISBN 978-0-8054-2291-7
- author Focus! The Power of People Group Thinking: A Practical Manual for Planning Effective Strategies to Reach the Unreached Missions Advanced Research &; Expanded edition (October 1989). ISBN 978-0-912552-66-8
- Numerous articles on mission and transformational prayer including the chapter on strategic praying for the popular missions course and reader, Perspectives on the World Christian movement.

== Personal life ==
He has been married for 50 years and has three adult children and three grandchildren. He enjoys reading, walking, skiing, sailing, traveling, and interacting with people from diverse cultures.
