= Paul Tewes =

American political strategist

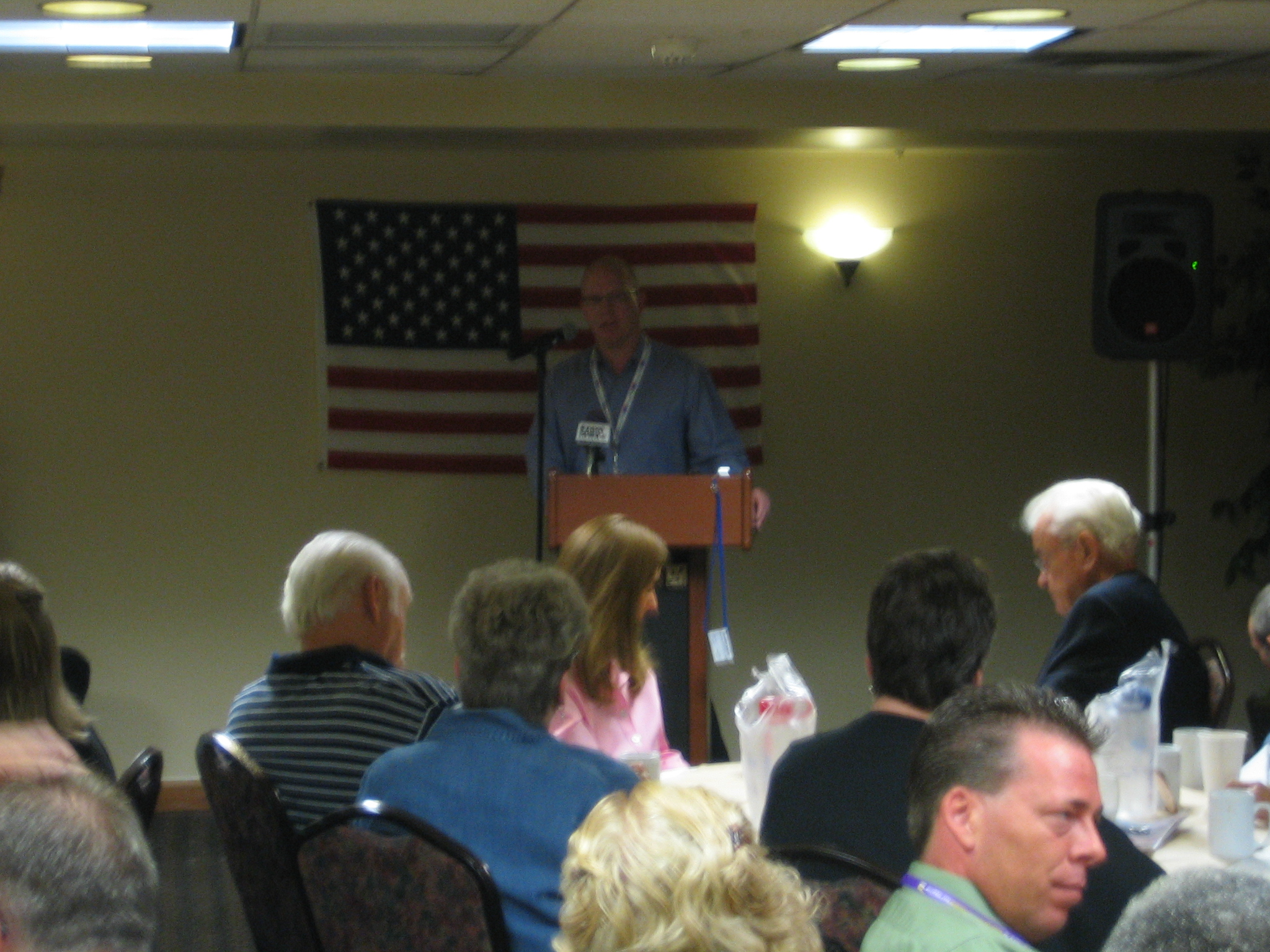
Paul Tewes speaks to the Iowa delegates at their Tuesday morning meeting.

Paul Tewes is a Democratic strategist specializing in national political organizing in the United States.

Tewes was the Iowa state director for Barack Obama's 2008 presidential campaign, and continued after the Iowa caucus to lead Obama's field operations in key states such as Nevada, Ohio and Pennsylvania. According to the Huffington Post, Tewes "is widely regarded among the very most talented of political organizers in the nation," and was "largely responsible for Obama's surprise win in Iowa".

== Life and career ==
Paul Tewes grew up in Mountain Lake, Minnesota.

In 1994, Tewes was a field director for Ann Wynia's US Senate Campaign in Minnesota. The following election cycle, in 1996, he was Campaign Manager of Congressman David Minge's successful re-election bid to Minnesota's Second Congressional District. Then, in 1998, Tewes ran the successful re-election campaign of Wisconsin Senator Russ Feingold. In 2000, Tewes was Al Gore's Iowa State Caucus director. From 2001 to 2004, he worked for the Democratic Senatorial Campaign Committee (DSCC), where he was the National Coordinated Campaign Director for the 2002 election cycle and the Political Director for the 2004 cycle. In 2005 Tewes partnered with Steve Hildebrand to form Hildebrand Tewes Consulting, a political campaign consulting firm with offices in Washington D.C. and Sioux Falls. In early 2007 Tewes and Hildebrand took a leave of absence from day-to-day operations of the firm to work for the Obama campaign—Hildebrand was Obama's Deputy Campaign Manager.

Shortly after Barack Obama clinched the nomination of the Democratic Party for president, it was reported that Obama would send Tewes to the Democratic National Committee (DNC) to overhaul the organization and help oversee fundraising. Howard Dean stayed on as DNC chairman.

Tewes worked at New Partners consulting firm in Washington, D.C. following the 2008 election. He has since started his own consulting firm, the Smoot Tewes Group, with fellow 2008 Obama Campaign veteran Julianna Smoot.

Tewes is a 1993 graduate of Carleton College in Northfield, Minnesota.
