= Fellowship of Evangelical Bible Churches =

The Fellowship of Evangelical Bible Churches (FEBC) is a small evangelical Christian denomination with an Anabaptist Mennonite heritage. Most of the denomination's approximately 5000 members are in congregations located in the U.S. and Canada.

== Background ==
The Fellowship of Evangelical Bible Churches was founded at Mountain Lake, Minnesota on October 14, 1889 as the Konference der Vereinigten Mennoniten-Brueder von Nord America (Conference of United Mennonite Brethren in North America). This body originated among Russian Mennonite immigrants that came to Canada and the United States from Russia around 1874. Their desire was to place greater evangelical emphasis on such doctrines as repentance, conversion, scriptural discipline and non-conformity to the world. Instrumental in the founding of the conference were Elder Isaac Peters of the Ebenezer Church in Henderson, Nebraska and Elder Aaron Wall, founder of the Brudertaler Church in Mountain Lake.

For many years member congregations used the name "Brudertaler," (or Bruderthaler) probably under the influence of the Mountain Lake founding church, and the conference itself was popularly called the Brudertaler (Bruderthaler) Conference. In 1914 the name was officially changed to The Defenceless Mennonite Brethren in Christ of North America. Then, in 1937 the name was formally changed to Evangelical Mennonite Brethren (EMB).

In 1956, the conference's headquarters were moved to Omaha, Nebraska from Mountain Lake, Minnesota.

The Evangelical Mennonite Brethren and the Evangelical Mennonite Church began talks of merger in 1953, but the effort ended without success in 1962. In this period, the Evangelical Mennonite Brethren Conference was also strengthening ties with the Evangelische Mennonitische Bruderschaft von Südamerika (Evangelical Mennonite Brethren of South America). These South American brethren shared similar background, language, doctrine, and practice. Affiliation was accomplished in 1958, with the South American group being made a district of the general conference, but with self-government. Until 1983, the conference officially held the Mennonite position of non-resistance and not bearing arms in war. Since that year, their constitution, while maintaining the official position, has also recognized the individual's right to their own conscience concerning these matters.

In the 1980s, a Canadian group which was originally known as the New Covenant Apostolic Order, separated from the EMB church, eventually becoming the Saskatchewan Diocese of the Evangelical Orthodox Church.

The Evangelical Mennonite Brethren Conference changed its name to the Fellowship of Evangelical Bible Churches on July 16, 1987. At that time the conference consisted of 36 congregations with a membership of 4583 (of which 1981 members in 20 congregations were in Canada and 423 members were in South America).

== Beliefs ==
The Fellowship of Evangelical Bible Churches holds an orthodox Trinitarian theology, the infallible inspiration of the Scriptures, and is dispensational premillennial in eschatology. The body recognizes two ordinances — baptism and the Lord's supper. They practice water baptism of believers by immersion, but will recognize as valid other modes when administered by others, or when immersion is impossible due to a medical condition. Open communion is observed with bread and fruit of the vine. The Fellowship of Evangelical Bible Churches exists to increase fellowship between member congregations, promote evangelism and missions, and represent the congregations through membership in boards and organizations outside the FEBC.

== Membership ==
In 2003 the FEBC in North America had 3,620 members (Canada - 2,170; USA - 1,450) in 36 congregations (Canada - 20; USA - 16), as well as 5 churches in Argentina and Paraguay. The Fellowship Focus is a bi-monthly magazine published by the FEBC. The conference headquarters are located in Omaha, Nebraska, having been moved there from Mountain Lake, Minnesota in 1956. They hold membership in the Evangelical Fellowship of Canada (org. 1964), and the Mennonite World Conference, and until January, 2023, they had held membership with the National Association of Evangelicals (USA, org. 1942).

In 2013, there were 44 congregations included on the FEBC rolls. Most of the churches were in the U.S. and Canada, with one being in Paraguay.

In 2025, there were 40 churches part of the FEBC. 23 of the churches are in Canada, (from Western Ontario to British Columbia), and 17 are in the U.S. (Wisconsin to Oregon and Oklahoma north to the Canadian border).
