= Sam Storms =

American clergyman (born 1951)

- Born: February 6, 1951 (age 75); Shawnee, Oklahoma, U.S.
- Education: B.A. University of Oklahoma (1973); Th.M. Dallas Theological Seminary (1977); Ph.D. University of Texas (1984)
- Website: www.samstorms.org

C. Samuel Storms is an American Calvinist Charismatic and amillennial theologian, teacher and author. Oklahoma City and past president of the Evangelical Theological Society.

== Life ==
Storms was born on February 6, 1951, in Shawnee, Oklahoma. After graduating from the University of Oklahoma, Storms became the interim pastor of Dallas Independent Presbyterian Church in Dallas, Texas. In 1977, he became an associate pastor at Believers Chapel in Dallas, where he an associate pastor until 1985. In 1985, he became the pastor at Christ Community Church in Ardmore, Oklahoma. In 1993, he became an associate pastor at Metro Christian Fellowship, then pastored by Mike Bickle, in Kansas City, Missouri.

In 2000, he left Kansas City to become a visiting associate professor at Wheaton College, in Wheaton, Illinois. In 2004, he left Wheaton College to found Enjoying God Ministries.

In 2008 he became the lead pastor of Bridgeway Church in Oklahoma City, Oklahoma. Storms also serves on the board of Desiring God Ministries, Bethlehem College and Seminary and the Acts 29 Network.

In January 2024, Storms launched the Convergence Church Network, a collaboration of like-minded leaders that promote, encourage, instruct, and support local churches committed to the convergence of Word and Spirit as a distinguishing feature of their ministry.

== Education ==
- B.A. University of Oklahoma (1973)
- Th.M. Dallas Theological Seminary (1977)
- Ph.D. University of Texas (1984)
