= Mountain Lake, Minnesota =

City in Minnesota, United States

Mountain Lake
- City
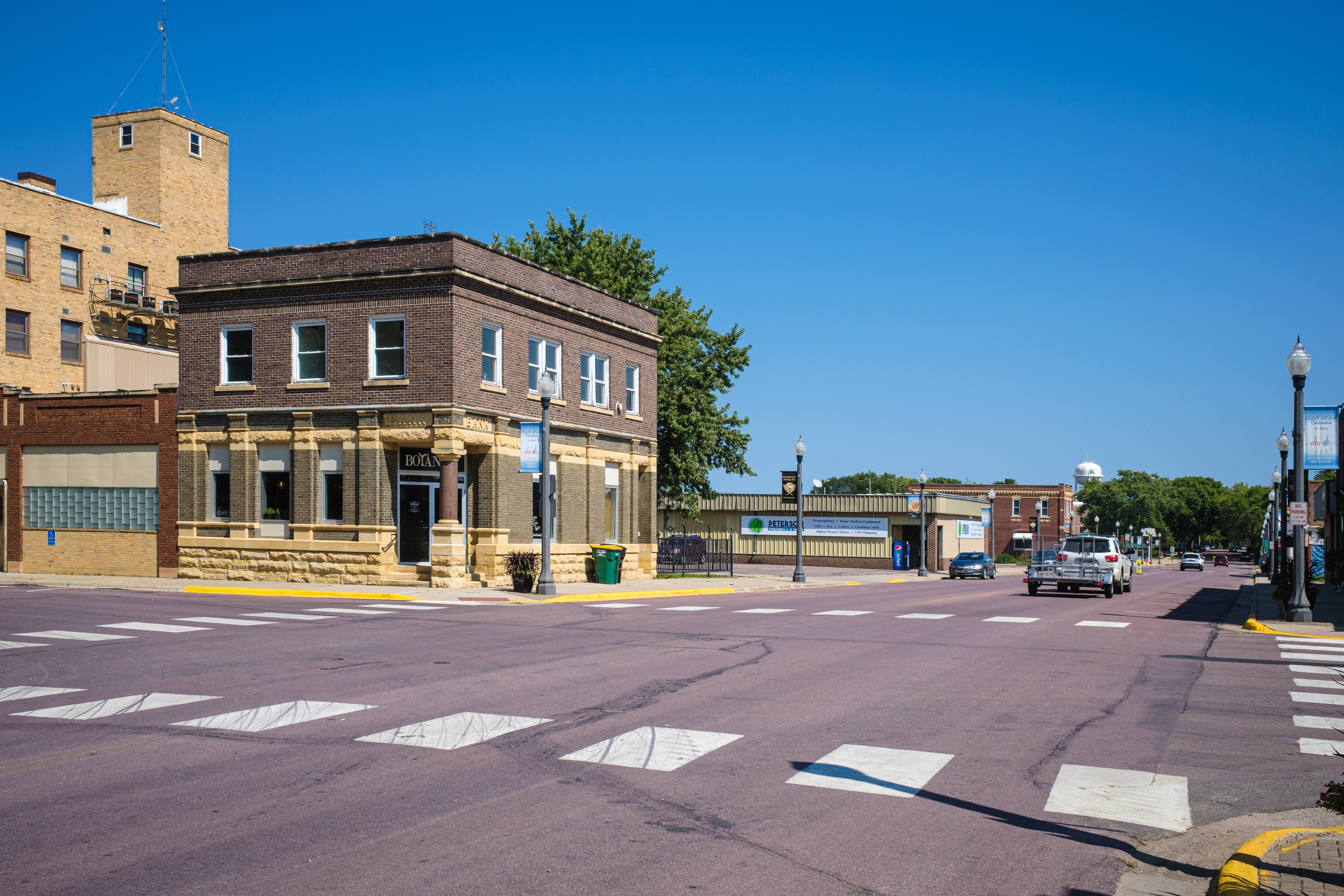
- Motto: "Home on the Prairie"
- Location of Mountain Lake, Minnesota
- Coordinates: 43°56′26″N 94°55′40″W
- Country: United States
- State: Minnesota
- County: Cottonwood
- Established: May 25, 1872

Government
  - Type: Mayor-Council

Area
  - Total: 1.65 sq mi (4.27 km^{2})
  - Land: 1.63 sq mi (4.23 km^{2})
  - Water: 0.015 sq mi (0.04 km^{2})
- Elevation: 1,296 ft (395 m)

Population (2020)
  - Total: 1,999
  - Density: 1,225.4/sq mi (473.12/km^{2})
- Time zone: UTC−6 (Central (CST))
  - Summer (DST): UTC−5 (CDT)
- ZIP Code: 56159
- Area code: 507
- FIPS code: 27-44566
- GNIS feature ID: 2395134
- Website: www.mountainlakemn.com

Mountain Lake is a city in Cottonwood County, Minnesota, United States. The population was 1,999 as of the 2020 census.

Mountain Lake was initially populated mostly by 1,800 Low German (or more specifically, Plautdietsch) speaking Mennonites from Russia who settled there between 1873 and 1880. The city has become more diverse, with the more recent addition of immigrant groups including Lao, Hmong, and Hispanic people, but a significant proportion of its inhabitants still have Mennonite surnames.

== History ==
The city of Mountain Lake was formally platted on May 25, 1872. It has had a post office in operation since 1871.

=== Original settlement ===
The name "Mountain Lake" is usually attributed to early settler William Mason. The city's website says: "the first white settler to the area, William Mason, found a shallow 900-acre lake with three islands. The two smaller islands just broke the water's surface. The third much larger, higher island looked to Mason like a mountain rising from the lake. He named the lake Mountain Lake and the island Mountain Island." The top of the island was covered with trees, and could be seen for miles around, thus serving as a landmark to early settlers. The story continues that in 1871 the St. Paul & Sioux City Railway had named the village "Midway", since it was midway between Saint Paul, Minnesota and Sioux City, Iowa. But Mason insisted that the village being platted be named "Mountain Lake".

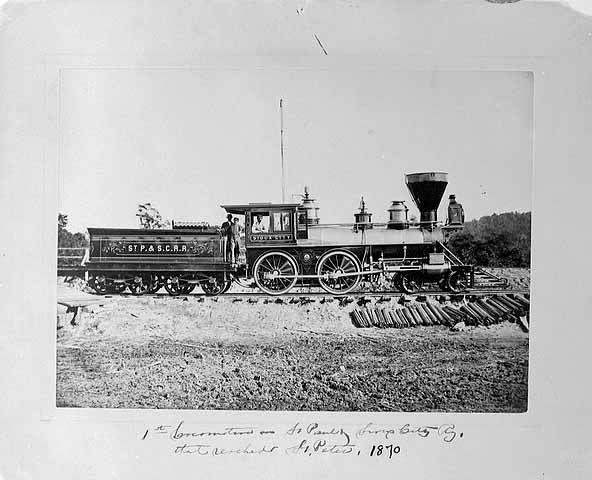
Locomotive with the St. Paul & Sioux City Railway

In 1905–06, demand for more tillable farmland and construction advances led to the draining of the original lake, which was in Mountain Lake township, southeast of town. But in 1937–38 the Works Progress Administration built a dam, bridge, and outlet at a new site in Midway township to create a new Mountain Lake. This lake, on the north edge of town, also has an island.

The large island of the original lake—now just a hill amid the surrounding cornfields—became a county park that has been listed on the National Register of Historic Places since 1973. Archeological evidence suggests that Mason was not the first to appreciate the unique qualities of the original lake's island. Artifacts unearthed in a 1976 dig indicate evidence of habitation as early as 500 BC, making the location the oldest human habitation yet to be discovered in Minnesota.

=== Mennonite immigration and influence ===
The coming of the railroad in 1873 played a big role in the village's expansion. By the time Mountain Lake was formally incorporated in 1886, it had a population of 300, primarily Russian Mennonites immigrating from Ukraine—at the time, part of the Russian Empire.

The Russian Mennonites had been recruited by William Seeger, a member of the Minnesota State Board of Immigration. Seeger had targeted them "because they were believed to be hard workers of good character". Most of these Mennonite families came from the Molotschna Colony, near the present-day city of Melitopol. But some Manitoba Mennonites originally from the Chortitza Colony, near the present-day Ukrainian city of Zaporizhzhia, also settled in the Mountain Lake area. It is estimated that some 295 Mennonite families had settled there by 1880.

Mountain Lake was already an established community and its surrounding farmland was largely surveyed, so the Mennonites could not arrange themselves in the traditional communal villages of their Ukrainian colonies. They had to adapt to American-style, single-family farms and live among their non-Mennonite neighbors. As settlement continued, Mountain Lake's Mennonites soon established a cohesive community "based primarily on agriculture and local commerce". For many decades thereafter, they continued to speak Plautdietsch, the Mennonite variant of Low German.

On October 14, 1889, the Konference der Vereinigten Mennoniten-Brueder von Nord America was founded in Mountain Lake. Elder Aaron Wall, founder of the Bruderthaler Church of Mountain Lake, and Elder Isaac Peters of the Ebenezer Church of Henderson, Nebraska, were instrumental in establishing this new Mennonite denomination. Known today as the Fellowship of Evangelical Bible Churches (FEBC), for many years the conference was popularly called the Bruderthaler Conference, because of the influential nature of the Mountain Lake founding church. In 1914 the name was officially changed to The Defenceless Mennonite Brethren in Christ of North America. In 1937 the name was changed again, to Evangelical Mennonite Brethren (EMB). The denominational headquarters was in Mountain Lake until 1956.

Around 1905, several local men founded Mountain Lake's Mennonite hospital. It struggled until 1912, when it was sold and reorganized as the Bethel Deaconess Hospital. The physicians in charge were Dr. Piper of Mountain Lake and Dr. Sogge of Windom, who were assisted by three deaconess sisters. The hospital was managed by a local board of directors consisting of one member of each of the town's five Mennonite churches.

== Geography ==
According to the United States Census Bureau, the city has an area of 1.55 square miles (4.01 km^{2}), of which 1.53 square miles (3.96 km^{2}) is land and 0.02 square miles (0.05 km^{2}) is water.

Minnesota State Highway 60 serves as a main route around the city, running generally east to west. County Road 1 runs north and south through town.

== Demographics ==
Historical population
Census	Pop.	Note	%±
1890	323		—
1900	959		196.9%
1910	1,081		12.7%
1920	1,309		21.1%
1930	1,388		6.0%
1940	1,745		25.7%
1950	1,733		−0.7%
1960	1,943		12.1%
1970	1,986		2.2%
1980	2,277		14.7%
1990	1,906		−16.3%
2000	2,082		9.2%
2010	2,104		1.1%
2020	1,999		−5.0%
U.S. Decennial Census

=== 2020 census ===
As of the 2020 census, Mountain Lake had a population of 1,999. The median age was 40.1 years. 24.8% of residents were under the age of 18 and 21.5% were 65 years of age or older. For every 100 females, there were 97.9 males, and for every 100 females age 18 and over there were 92.9 males age 18 and over.

There were 771 households, of which 31.1% had children under the age of 18 living in them. Of all households, 49.2% were married-couple households, 18.3% were households with a male householder and no spouse or partner present, and 26.7% were households with a female householder and no spouse or partner present. About 31.4% of all households were made up of individuals, and 16.5% had someone living alone who was 65 years of age or older.

There were 839 housing units, of which 8.1% were vacant. The homeowner vacancy rate was 1.7% and the rental vacancy rate was 10.5%. 0.0% of residents lived in urban areas, while 100.0% lived in rural areas.

Racial composition as of the 2020 census
Race	Number	Percent
White	1,426	71.3%
Black or African American	19	1.0%
American Indian and Alaska Native	4	0.2%
Asian	246	12.3%
Native Hawaiian and Other Pacific Islander	5	0.3%
Some other race	190	9.5%
Two or more races	109	5.5%
Hispanic or Latino (of any race)	281	14.1%

=== 2010 census ===
As of the census of 2010, there were 2,104 people, 829 households, and 526 families residing in the city. The population density was 1,375.2 inhabitants per square mile (531.0/km^{2}). There were 923 housing units at an average density of 603.3 per square mile (232.9/km^{2}). The racial makeup of the city was 82.8% White, 0.8% African American, 0.2% Native American, 10.3% Asian, 0.1% Pacific Islander, 3.9% from other races, and 1.9% from two or more races. Hispanic or Latino of any race were 10.7% of the population.

There were 829 households, of which 31.4% had children under the age of 18 living with them, 49.9% were married couples living together, 9.4% had a female householder with no husband present, 4.1% had a male householder with no wife present, and 36.6% were non-families. Of all households, 34.0% were made up of individuals, and 18.3% had someone living alone who was 65 years of age or older. The average household size was 2.48 and the average family size was 3.16.

The median age in the city was 39.3 years. 27.6% of residents were under the age of 18; 7.8% were between the ages of 18 and 24; 20.6% were from 25 to 44; 23.1% were from 45 to 64; and 20.7% were 65 years of age or older. The gender makeup of the city was 48.7% male and 51.3% female.

=== 2000 census ===
As of the census of 2000, there were 2,082 people, 817 households, and 531 families residing in the city. The population density was 1,540.3 inhabitants per square mile (594.7/km^{2}). There were 896 housing units at an average density of 662.9 per square mile (255.9/km^{2}). The racial makeup of the city was 84.29% White, 0.58% African American, 0.48% Native American, 6.82% Asian, 0.10% Pacific Islander, 4.27% from other races, and 3.46% from two or more races. Hispanic or Latino of any race were 5.76% of the population.

There were 817 households, out of which 31.0% had children under the age of 18 living with them, 53.0% were married couples living together, 8.9% had a female householder with no husband present, and 35.0% were non-families. Of all households, 32.3% were made up of individuals, and 20.6% had someone living alone who was 65 years of age or older. The average household size was 2.41 and the average family size was 3.07.

In the city, the population was spread out, with 26.5% under the age of 18, 7.4% from 18 to 24, 22.2% from 25 to 44, 16.5% from 45 to 64, and 27.4% who were 65 years of age or older. The median age was 40 years. For every 100 females, there were 92.1 males. For every 100 females age 18 and over, there were 83.5 males.

The median income for a household in the city was $29,146, and the median income for a family was $36,652. Males had a median income of $30,291 versus $17,917 for females. The per capita income for the city was $13,845. About 8.5% of families and 13.0% of the population were below the poverty line, including 22.2% of those under age 18 and 5.4% of those age 65 or over.

== Politics ==
Mountain Lake is in Minnesota's 1st congressional district, represented by Brad Finstad, a Republican. At the state level, Mountain Lake is in Senate District 22, represented by Republican Doug Magnus, and House District 22B, represented by Republican Rod Hamilton.

Gilbert Esau, one of southern Minnesota's longest-serving legislators, resided in Mountain Lake. Esau represented Mountain Lake in the Minnesota House for all but four of the years from 1962 to 1982.

== Notable people ==
- Silas Bartsch, school administrator
- John Basinger, actor
- Larry Buhler, football player
- George Buhr, coach
- Gilbert Esau, politician
- Herman Becker Fast, politician
- Walter Franz, politician
- Rod Hamilton, politician
- Orlando J. Heinitz, politician
- Chuck Loewen, football player
- George W. Olson, politician
- Neva Pilgrim, soprano
- Samuel J. Schultz, Old Testament scholar
- Paul Tewes, political organize
