= George Mann (politician) =

American politician

Member of the Minnesota House of Representatives from the 10, 18A, 27A, 28B district
- In office January 6, 1959 – June 4, 1984
- Preceded by: George W. Olson
- Succeeded by: Dennis C. Frederickson

Personal details
- Born: March 26, 1918 Heron Lake, Minnesota
- Died: June 4, 1984 (aged 66) Windom, Minnesota
- Party: Democratic Farmer Labor Party
- Spouse: Alice
- Occupation: Farmer, legislator

George L. Mann (March 26, 1918 – June 4, 1984) was a Minnesota politician and a member of the Minnesota House of Representatives from southwestern Minnesota.

First elected in 1958, Mann was re-elected every two years through the 1982 general election. He represented the old districts 10, 18A, 27A and, later, District 28B, which included all or portions of Cottonwood, Jackson, Martin, Nobles and Watonwan counties, changing somewhat through state redistricting in 1960, 1970 and 1980.

While in the legislature, Mann earned a reputation as a strong advocate for farmers, and as a leader on issues relevant to agricultural and transportation. He allied with the Liberal Caucus at a time when the legislature was still officially nonpartisan, and later identified as a Democrat when party affiliation became required of candidates.

Mann served on the House Agriculture, Appropriations, Commerce, Crime Prevention, Education, Financial Institutions & Insurance, Rules & Legislative Administration, and Transportation committees, and on various other committee incarnations and subcommittees during his 25 years in office. He was chair of the House Agriculture Committee from 1973 to 1980 and of the House Transportation Committee from 1983 to 1984, and also served as an assistant majority leader from 1979 to 1982.

In addition to his legislative service, Mann was also a member of the U.S. Department of Agriculture’s National Corn Committee in the 1960s and early 1970s, and served as leader of the U.S.D.A.’s agricultural delegation to Europe and the Soviet Union in 1967 as part of the department’s “People to People” Program.

Mann and his wife, Alice, were lifelong grain farmers just outside the town of Windom. After his death, the Minnesota Legislature and Governor Rudy Perpich named Minnesota Highway 60 from Mankato to Brewster the “George Mann Memorial Highway” in his honor.
