= Missiology (journal) =

- Discipline: Missiology
- Language: English
- Edited by: Leanne Dzubinski (Editor) William Green (Associate Editor)

Publication details
- Former name: Practical Anthropology
- History: 1973–present
- Publisher: SAGE Publications
- Frequency: Quarterly

Standard abbreviations
- ISO 4: Missiology

Indexing
- ISSN: 0091-8296
- OCLC no.: 57346936

Links
- Journal homepage

Missiology: An International Review is a quarterly peer-reviewed academic journal in the field of missiology. Established in 1973, it is the official journal of the American Society of Missiology.

The editor is Leannae Dzubinski (Asbury Theological Seminary), and the Associate Editor is William R. Green (Kairos University).

The journal is published by SAGE Pub and has 10,000+ worldwide subscribers and 40,000+ individual PDF and HTML annual downloads.
