= Stanley N. Gundry =

American theologian, author, and academic

Stanley Norman Gundry (born 1937) is an American evangelical theologian, seminary professor, publisher, and author. He served as series editor for the Zondervan "Counterpoints" series, which present multiple views on a variety of theological topics.

== Early life and education ==
Gundry was born in 1937 to Norman C. and Lolita (née Hinshaw) Gundry, Christian missionaries to Nigeria under the auspices of the Sudan Interior Mission. He is the younger brother of Robert H. Gundry.

Gundry earned his B.A. from Los Angeles Baptist College, his B.D. from Talbot Theological Seminary, his S.T.M. from Union College of British Columbia, and his S.T.D. from Lutheran School of Theology at Chicago.

== Career ==
Gundry was ordained and began serving as a pastor in rural Washington state in 1963. In 1968, he became Professor of Theology at Moody Bible Institute where he taught for 11 years. In 1975 he was appointed as Adjunct Professor of Theology at Trinity Evangelical Divinity School, and in 1978 he served as president of the Evangelical Theological Society. Gundry was forced to resign from Moody for supporting his wife's egalitarian views in her book, Woman Be Free. In 1980, he accepted an editorial position at Zondervan. He was hired to lead and develop Zondervan's academic publishing in the biblical, theological, and ministry related disciplines. He was an early member of Christians for Biblical Equality and was one of the framers of the classic statement "Men, Women, and Biblical Equality." He later served two terms on the Board of CBE. In 2009, he became Adjunct Professor of Historical Theology at Grand Rapids Theological Seminary. He is currently a Senior Vice President and Publisher at Zondervan, a division of HarperCollins Christian Publishing.

In 2017, a Festschrift was published in his honor. Evangelical Scholarship, Retrospects and Prospects: Essays in Honor of Stanley N. Gundry included contributions from Craig L. Blomberg, Millard J. Erickson, Gordon D. Fee, Robert H. Gundry, Karen H. Jobes, Tremper Longman III, Richard J. Mouw, John H. Walton, Christopher J. H. Wright and John D. Woodbridge.

== Publications ==
- John Owen's Doctrine of the Scriptures: An Original Study of His Approach to the Problem of Authority (1967) Union College of British Columbia thesis
- "Typology as a means of interpretation: past and present" (PDF). JETS. 12 (4): 233. Fall 1969.
- Facing the Issues of Tongues:Six Crucial Questions for Seekers and Speakers and Others who are Concerned (1973) ISBN 0802425119
- "Hermeneutics or zeitgeist as the determining factor in the history of eschatologies?" (PDF). JETS. 20 (1): 45. March 1977.
- The NIV Harmony of the Gospels (1988) ISBN 0060635231
- Love Them in: The Life and Theology of D.L. Moody (1999) ISBN 0802490573
