= Moisés Silva =

Cuban-American biblical scholar, theologian, and academic (born 1945)

Moisés Silva (born September 4, 1945) is a Cuban-born American biblical scholar and translator.

== Life ==
He was born in Havana, Cuba, and has lived in the US since 1960.

=== Education ===
Silva holds degrees from Bob Jones University (BA, 1966), Westminster Theological Seminary (BD, 1969; ThM, 1971), and the University of Manchester (PhD, 1972). At Manchester he studied under New Testament and Biblical Studies luminaries, F. F. Bruce and James Barr. The latter's The Semantics of Biblical Language (1961) was a strong influence on Silva's Biblical Words and Their Meaning (1983, 2nd ed. 1994), which challenged many common linguistic fallacies in biblical interpretation.

=== Academic work ===
He has taught biblical studies at Westmont College (1972–1981), Westminster Theological Seminary (1981–1996), and Gordon-Conwell Theological Seminary (1996–2000), where he was the Mary French Rockefeller Distinguished Professor of New Testament until his retirement. He is a past president of the Evangelical Theological Society (1997).

For many years he had been an ordained minister of the Orthodox Presbyterian Church.

=== Writings ===
He served as a translator of the New American Standard Bible, the New Living Translation (Ephesians–Philemon), the English Standard Version and the Nueva Versión Internacional, and as a New Testament consultant for Eugene Peterson's The Message. He has also authored or coauthored several books and articles, including a highly acclaimed commentary on Philippians; Invitation to the Septuagint (with Karen Jobes); God, Language, and Scripture; Has the Church Misread the Bible?; and An Introduction to Biblical Hermeneutics (with Walter Kaiser, Jr.). He is editor of the second edition of the New International Dictionary of New Testament Theology and Exegesis (NIDNTTE), formerly edited by Colin Brown. He currently resides in Litchfield, Michigan, where he continues his work as an author and editor.

== Works ==
- Silva, Moisés (1985). Biblical Words and Their Meaning: An Introduction to Lexical Semantics. Grand Rapids, MI: Zondervan. p. 228. ISBN 9780310276197.
- ———; Kaiser, Jr., Walter C. (1994). Introduction to Biblical Hermeneutics: the Search for Meaning. Grand Rapids, MI: Zondervan. p. 352. ISBN 9780310279518.
- ———, ed. (1996). Foundations of Contemporary Interpretation. Grand Rapids, MI: Zondervan. p. 690. ISBN 9780310208280.
- ———; Jobes, Karen H. (2005). Philippians. BECNT. p. 272. ISBN 9780801031151.
- ———; Jobes, Karen H. (2005). Invitation to the Septuagint. Grand Rapids, MI: Baker Academic. p. 352. ISBN 9780801031151.
- ——— (2011). The Essential Companion to Life in Bible Times: Key Insights for Reading God's Word. Grand Rapids, MI: Zondervan. p. 144. ISBN 9780310286882.
- ——— (2011). The Essential Bible Dictionary: Key Insights for Reading God's Word. Grand Rapids, MI: Zondervan. p. 240. ISBN 9780310278214.
- ———, ed. (2014). New International Dictionary of New Testament Theology and Exegesis. Grand Rapids, MI: Zondervan. p. 3552. ISBN 9780310276197.

== Sources ==
- Beale, G. K.; Carson, D. A., eds. (2007). Commentary on the New Testament Use of the Old Testament. Baker Books. ISBN 978-1441210524.
