= Clarence Bouma =

Clarence Bouma (November 30, 1891, in Harlingen, Friesland – August 12, 1962, in Grand Rapids, Michigan) was a theologian and professor at Calvin Theological Seminary.

== Early life and education ==
Bouma was born Klaas Bouma in the Netherlands in 1891 as the son of Doeke Bouma and Trijntje de Jong. The family immigrated to the United States in May 1905. He earned his A.B. (1917) at Calvin College, and his B.D. (1918) at Princeton Seminary, where he was awarded the Gelston-Winthrop Fellowship in Apologetics. He went on to earn his A.M. (1919) from Princeton University, and his Th.D. (1921) from Harvard Divinity School.

== Academic career ==
After briefly serving as a pastor in the Summer Street Christian Reformed Church in Passaic, New Jersey, Bouma joined the faculty at Calvin Theological Seminary in 1924. His first role was as Chair of Dogmatics, but shortly thereafter moved to a new role as Chair of Apologetics and Ethics. He was succeeded in Dogmatics by Louis Berkhof, author of Systematic Theology. In 1935, he became the editor of The Calvin Forum, and continued to serve in that role the rest of his career. Bouma also served for one semester in 1940 as visiting professor at Gordon College and Divinity School. He was a member of the Reformed Ecumenical Synods of 1946 and 1949.

Throughout his tenure, Bouma opposed liberal and modernist movements in Christianity, and became a key member in the mid-twentieth century development of American evangelicalism. Bouma was influential in the 1942 formation of the National Association of Evangelicals, and in 1949 was elected the first president of the Evangelical Theological Society.

== Health decline and death ==
The conflict between traditional and progressive theologies escalated in 1951 to the point that Bouma suffered a "nervous breakdown that left him in a psychiatric hospital for the ten remaining years of his life." He died on August 12, 1962, survived at the time by his wife.

== Publications ==
- Theism and Personalism (1921) Harvard Divinity School (doctoral thesis)
- A Theological Bibliography (1925) Grand Rapids Printing Company
- The Word of God and the Reformed Faith Addresses delivered at the 2nd American Calvinistic Conference, editor (1943) Baker Book House
- Calvinism in Times of Crisis with G. Charles Aalders, Gerrit C. Berkouwer, Stephanus du Toit, and H.G. Stoker, editors (1947) Baker Book House
- Bouma, Clarence (Jan 1947). "Calvinism in American Theology Today". The Journal of Religion. 27 (1): 34–45. doi:10.1086/483537. JSTOR 1198104. S2CID 170675523.
- God-Centered Living: or, Calvinism in Action, a Symposium by Calvinistic Action Committee, introduction by Clarence Bouma (1951) Baker Book House
