= Keith Yandell =

American philosopher (1938–2020)

- Born: July 16, 1938; Davenport, Iowa
- Died: April 28, 2020 (aged 81); Madison, Wisconsin

Academic background
- Education: Wayne State University (BA, MA); Ohio State University (PhD)

Keith Edward Yandell (July 16, 1938, Davenport, Iowa – April 28, 2020, Madison, Wisconsin) was a philosopher of religion who became notable by his teaching and his writings.

== Teaching ==
Yandell began teaching in the Department of Philosophy at the University of Wisconsin, Madison in 1966. He had become the Julius R. Weinberg Professor of Philosophy when he retired in 2011.

Beginning in 2004 and continuing after his retirement from the University of Wisconsin, Madison, Yandell became an Affiliate Professor of Philosophy at the Trinity Evangelical Divinity School in Deerfield, Illinois. Yanell defended substance dualism.

== Education ==
Yandell earned a BA and an MA from Wayne State University. He received a PhD from Ohio State University.

His fields of expertise include: History of modern philosophy, Metaphysics, Philosophy of religion, Ethics, and Indian philosophy.

== Works ==
Yandell has over 60 articles and reviews in journals listed in EBSCO. His books including those co-authored or edited include the following:

- Yandell, Keith (1960). Free Will and Evil (MA thesis). Wayne State University.
- Yandell, Keith (1966). Metaphysical Systems and Decision Procedures (PhD thesis). Ohio State University.
- Yandell, Keith (1971). Basic Issues in the Philosophy of Religion. Boston: Allyn and Bacon. OCLC 124547.
- Weinberg, Julius R.; Yandell, Keith E. (1971). Problems in Philosophical Inquiry: Theory of Knowledge. New York: Holt, Rinehart and Winston. ISBN 9780030833809. OCLC 141013.
- Weinberg, Julius R.; Yandell, Keith E. (1971). Metaphysics. New York: Holt, Rinehart and Winston. OCLC 489650.
- Weinberg, Julius R.; Yandell, Keith E. (1971). Theory of Knowledge. New York: Holt, Rinehart and Winston. OCLC 1407243.
- Weinberg, Julius R.; Yandell, Keith E. (1971). Philosophy of Religion. New York: Holt, Rinehart and Winston.
- Weinberg, Julius R.; Yandell, Keith E. (1971). Ethics. New York: Holt, Rinehart and Winston.
- Yandell, Keith (1973). God, Man, and Religion: Readings in the Philosophy of Religion. New York: McGraw-Hill. ISBN 9780070722477. OCLC 297768.
- Yandell, Keith E. (1984). Christianity and philosophy. Studies in a Christian world view. Vol. 2. Grand Rapids, MI: Eerdmans. ISBN 978-0-8028-1964-2.
- Yandell, Keith E. (1990). Hume's 'inexplicable mystery': His views on religion. Philadelphia: Temple University Press. ISBN 978-0-87722-643-7. OCLC 646816246.
- Yandell, Keith E. (1994). The epistemology of religious experience. Cambridge: Cambridge University Press. ISBN 9780521374262.
- Yandell, Keith E. (1999). Philosophy of religion: a contemporary introduction. Routledge contemporary introductions to philosophy. London: Routledge. ISBN 978-0-415-13213-8.
- Yandell, Keith E.; Paul, John J., eds. (2000). Religion and public culture: encounters and identities in modern South India. London: Routledge. ISBN 978-0-7007-1101-7.
- Yandell, Keith E., ed. (2001). Faith and narrative. Oxford: Oxford University Press. ISBN 978-0-19-513145-1.
- Netland, Harold A.; Yandell, Keith E. (2009). Buddhism: a Christian exploration and appraisal. Downers Grove, IL: IVP Academic. ISBN 978-0-8308-3855-4.
- Spirituality Without God: Buddhist Enlightenment and Christian Salvation. Milton Keynes: Paternoster. 2009. ISBN 9781842276426. OCLC 303019546.
- The Soul (Defence of the Evidential Value of). Ashgate. 2015. ISBN 9780754615330.

In addition to books, Yandell has published essays on Anselm, miracles, and religious language; as well as a series of articles on the problem of evil; a series of articles on the epistemic status of religious experience; a series of articles on Hume's philosophy of religion; a series of articles on the supposed ineffability of religious beings or experiences; a series of articles on Indian philosophy; a series of articles on religion and morality; and a series of articles on philosophical issues concerning Christian theology, especially concerning the nature of God. He was working on metaphysical issues in the philosophy of religion and on religious pluralism.
