= George W. Olson =

American politician (1893–1958)

George W. Olson (October 25, 1893 – February 27, 1958) was an American farmer and politician.

Olson was born in Jackson County, Minnesota and went to the Jackson County public schools. He served in the United States Army during World War I. Olson went to the Mankato Commercial College. Olson lived in Mountain Lake, Minnesota with his wife and family and was a farmer. He served on the Mountain Lake Township Board, on the Mountain Lake School Board, and was a Democrat. Olson served in the Minnesota House of Representatives in 1933 and 1934, in 1937 and 1938, and then from 1957 to 1958 when he died while still in office. Olson died from a heart attack while attending a Minnesota Democratic–Farmer–Labor Party meeting.
