= Karen Jobes =

American biblical scholar (born 1952)

Karen H. Jobes (born 1952) is an American biblical scholar who is Gerald F. Hawthorne Professor Emerita of New Testament Greek and Exegesis at Wheaton College. She has written a number of books and biblical commentaries. In 2015, she received the Evangelical Christian Publishers Association's Christian Book of the Year Award for "Bible Reference" books. Jobes served as the first female president of the Evangelical Theological Society in 2024.

== Education ==
Jobes was born Karen Hill and raised in New Jersey. She completed a BA in physics from Trenton State College in 1974 and an MS in computer science from Rutgers University in 1979. She became a Christian while at college. She returned to study and completed a Master of Arts in Religion (1989) and PhD (1995) in Biblical Hermeneutics from Westminster Theological Seminary. Her dissertation, titled The Alpha-Text of Esther: Its Character and relationship to the Masoretic Text, was supervised by Moisés Silva, with whom she went on to co-author Invitation to the Septuagint, which has become a standard textbook in studies of the Septuagint.

== Career and research ==
Jobes worked in physics and computer science at Princeton University and Johnson and Johnson before returning to study theology.

Jobes has taught New Testament and written commentaries on both Old and New Testament books. From 2005 until 2015, she was the Gerald F. Hawthorne Professor of New Testament Greek and Greek Exegesis at Wheaton College. She taught biblical Greek classes and classes on the Septuagint. She has written a number of books out of her classroom teaching including Discovering the Septuagint, a guided reader for students working with the Greek biblical text, and Letters to the Church, a commentary on Epistle to the Hebrews and the General Epistles that provides a model for students to work through critical issues and draw their own conclusions.

Jobes translated the Codex Sinaiticus Esther for the British Library. She was also part of the NIV and TNIV translation committee for over ten years.

== Awards and honors ==
In 2015, Jobes' commentary on the Johannine epistles won the Evangelical Christian Publishers Association's Christian Book of the Year Award for "Bible Reference" books. In 2018, the Society of Biblical Literature awarded Jobes its Status of Women in the Profession Outstanding Service in Mentoring award.

== Personal life ==
Jobes married Forrest "Buzz" Jobes, a research physicist, in 1980 and has two stepsons. He died in 2023. She is a member of Oreland Evangelical Presbyterian Church.

== Selected publications ==
=== Books ===
- Jobes, Karen H. (2005). 1 Peter. Baker Exegetical Commentary on the New Testament. Baker Academic. ISBN 9781585583621.
- Burge, Gary M.; Lee-Thorp, Karen; Jobes, Karen H. (2008). John: The Gospel of Life. Harper Collins. ISBN 9780310276517.
- Moo, Douglas J.; Lee-Thorp, Karen; Jobes, Karen H. (2008). Romans: Celebrating the Good News. Zondervan.
- Jobes, Karen H. (2011). Esther. NIV Application Commentary. Zondervan Academic. ISBN 9780310872146.
- Jobes, Karen H. (2011). Letters to the Church: A Survey of Hebrews and the General Epistles. Zondervan Academic. ISBN 9780310494799.
- Jobes, Karen H. (2014). 1, 2, and 3 John. Exegetical Commentary on the Testament. Zondervan Academic. ISBN 9780310518013.
- Jobes, Karen H.; Silva, Moisés (2015). Invitation to the Septuagint. Baker Academic. ISBN 9781493400041.
- Jobes, Karen (2016). Discovering the Septuagint: A Guided Reader. Kregel Academic. ISBN 9780825443428.
- Jobes, Karen H. (2021). John Through Old Testament Eyes: A Background and Application Commentary. Kregel Publications. ISBN 9780825445088.

=== Chapters and articles ===
- Jobes, Karen H. (1993). "Jerusalem, Our Mother:Metalepsis and Intertextuality in Galatians 4:21-31" (PDF). Westminster Theological Journal. 55: 299–320. Archived from the original (PDF) on 2021-04-16.
- Jobes, Karen H. (2002). "Got Milk? Septuagint Psalm 33 and the Interpretation of 1 Peter 2:1-3" (PDF). Westminster Theological Journal. 63: 1–14.
- Jobes, Karen H. (2006). "The Septuagint Textual Tradition in 1 Peter". In Wolfgang Kraus; R. Glenn Wooden (eds.). Septuagint Research: Issues and Challenges in the Study of the Greek Jewish Scriptures. Society of Biblical Literature Septuagint and Cognate Studies. Vol. 53. Scholars Press. pp. 311–333.
- Jobes, Karen H. (2006). "When God Spoke Greek - The Place of the Greek Bible in Evangelical Scholarship". Bulletin for Biblical Research. 16 (2): 219–236. doi:10.2307/26424077. JSTOR 26424077.
- Jobes, Karen H. (2007). "Relevance Theory and the Translation of Scripture". Journal of the Evangelical Theological Society. 50 (4): 773–797.
- Jobes, Karen H. (2009). "The Minor Prophets in James, Peter, and Jude". In Maarten J.J. Menken; Steve Moyise (eds.). The Minor Prophets in the New Testament. T&T Clark. pp. 135–153. ISBN 9780567689665.
- Jobes, Karen H. (2010). "The Septuagint as Scripture in the Early Church". In Michael Bird; Michael Pahl (eds.). The Sacred Text: Excavating the Texts, Exploring the Interpretations, and Engaging the Theologies of the Christian Scriptures. Gorgias Press. pp. 21–41. ISBN 9781607247418.
