= Evangelical Dictionary of Theology =

- Editor: Walter A. Elwell
- Publisher: Baker Academic
- Publication date: 2001 (2nd edition)
- Pages: 1312

The Evangelical Dictionary of Theology is a Christian reference work published by Baker Books. It was first published in 1984, with a second edition appearing in 2001. The general editor is Walter A. Elwell. It was a successor to Baker's Dictionary of Theology. John Jefferson Davis describes it as a "first-class piece of evangelical scholarship", while David Dockery calls it an "outstanding contribution to the fields of biblical, historical and systematic theology".

== Links ==
- Evangelical Dictionary of Theology on the Internet Archive
