= Elmer Smick =

American Bible scholar (1921–1994)

Elmer Bernard Smick (July 10, 1921 - December 7, 1994) was an Old Testament scholar, professor, and former president of the Evangelical Theological Society.

== Background and education ==
Smick was born in Baltimore, Maryland and married childhood sweetheart Jane Harrison on August 19, 1944. He earned his B.A. (1944) from The Kings College, his Th.B. (1947) and S.T.M (1948) from Faith Theological Seminary, and his Ph.D. (1951) from the Dropsie College for Hebrew and Cognate Learning. He also completed post-doctoral studies at Brandeis University (1958) New York University (1967).

== Academic career ==
Smick taught ancient history and Semitic studies at Shelton College while pastoring Bible Presbyterian Church in Trenton, New Jersey. From 1956 to 1971, he was professor of Old Testament language and literature at Covenant Theological Seminary. From 1971 to 1991, he was professor of Old Testament at Gordon-Conwell Theological Seminary. In 1976, the NIV Committee on Bible Translation invited Smick "to assist it in the final editorial review" of the first edition of the Old Testament. Smick served as president of the Evangelical Theological Society in 1988, as well as on the advisory board of the National Association of Professors of Hebrew, and was a fellow of the Institute for Biblical Research.

== Publications ==
- A Guide to the Study of Old Testament Poetry.
- Archaeology of the Jordan Valley. 1973. ISBN 0801079519.
- "Job". Expositor's Bible Commentary. 1988. ISBN 0310364604.
