= Trinity Evangelical Divinity School =

Divinity school

Coordinates: 42°11′52.5″N 87°52′51.8″W

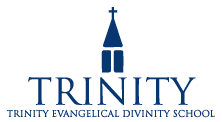
- Type: Private
- Established: 1897; 129 years ago
- Parent institution: Trinity International University
- Affiliations: Evangelical Free Church of America
- President: David W. Pao (interim)
- Students: 368 FTE (2025)
- Location: 2065 Half Day Road, Deerfield, Illinois, United States
- Campus: Suburban
- Website: tiu.edu/divinity

Trinity Evangelical Divinity School (TEDS) was the divinity school of Trinity International University, an evangelical Christian university headquartered in Bannockburn, Illinois. The divinity school was founded in 1897.

In April 2025, Trinity Evangelical Divinity School announced that it would merge with Trinity Western University in British Columbia, Canada, and would cease operations at the Chicagoland campus. TEDS is now fully operational as part of TWU in Langley, having retained many of its key faculty in its move to Canada, and offers fully accredited graduate, certificate, and diploma programs to students globally.

== Overview ==
TEDS is one of the largest seminaries in the world, enrolling more than 1,200 graduate students in professional and academic programs, including more than 150 in its Ph.D. programs. The most popular degree at the school, the Master of Divinity (M.Div.) degree, prepares pastors, educators, and missionaries for many kinds of service. The school also offers a range of focused Master of Arts programs in mental health counseling, theological studies, the New Testament, the Old Testament, and other disciplines. Trinity offers a comprehensive listing of academic programs with Master of Arts (MA), Master of Divinity (M.Div), Master of Theology (Th.M), Doctor of Ministry (D.Min) and Doctor of Philosophy (Ph.D) degrees.

TEDS is affiliated with the Evangelical Free Church of America and is accredited by the Association of Theological Schools in the United States and Canada. It publishes the Trinity Journal.

Trinity honors and continues the legacy of its major contributors through a combination of centers, lectures, and honoraria. The Carl F. H. Henry Center is a nod to longtime TEDS faculty member and theologian Carl F. H. Henry, which also continues his vision of theological development. The Paul Hiebert Center for World Christianity and Global Theology is named after the Trinity Evangelical Missions department faculty member Paul Hiebert. He made numerous contributions to the field of mission research and practical application on the field. The Hiebert Center at TEDS is designed to foster collaboration between missionary personnel, academics, and laypeople from across the world to engage in research and field work. The Kenneth Kantzer Lectures are named after the namesake visionary who shaped Trinity Evangelical Divinity School.

In April 2025, TEDS and Trinity Western University (TWU) announced that TWU is assuming ownership of TEDS in a process that will complete in 2026.

== History of TEDS ==
Trinity Evangelical Divinity School was incorporated in 1963 as the result of a merge between Trinity Seminary and Bible College and its relocation to Deerfield Illinois. Kenneth Kantzer was elected Dean and had the vision to create a “divinity school” which would be a university environment of biblical studies where world class scholars would produce world class students. Trinity became an academic heavyweight in the late 1960s by hiring top academic faculty in their respective fields. Trinity’s mission, statement of faith and curriculum were greatly influenced by Kenneth Kantzer and Carl F. H. Henry. Both men are ranked as being among the most important evangelicals of the 20th century. Some of the most notable evangelical scholars came to Trinity due to Dean Kantzer's recruiting efforts. These faculty included Robert Culver (Systematic Theology), John Warwick Montgomery (Church history), Walter Kaiser (Old Testament), Richard Troup (Christian Education), Gleason Archer Jr (Old Testament) and David Hasselgrave (Missions), among several others. Some of the academic faculty who were a part of Fuller Theological Seminary had left the seminary due to its change of stance on biblical inerrancy. The faculty who departed believed in full biblical inerrancy that the Bible doesn’t contain any error whether it is matters of faith or history or science. Trinity became a rival to Fuller Seminary for the leadership of evangelicalism. Trinity continues to produce first rate scholarship in the 21st century with professors such as Kevin Vanhoozer, D. A. Carson, Paul Feinberg, John Feinberg, Paul Hiebert and John D. Woodbridge holding faculty positions within the school. Trinity continues the legacy of both Kenneth Kantzer and Carl F. H. Henry through the school's operation but also the Carl Henry Center on campus and the Kenneth Kantzer Lectures. In 2022, TEDS celebrated 125 years of the school in operation. The book Great is thy Faithfulness was published by some of the faculty detailing the years at Trinity.

== Notable faculty ==
- Gleason Archer - Former Professor of Old Testament and Semitics (1965-1986)
- Barry J. Beitzel - Professor Emeritus of Old Testament and Semitic Languages (1976-2016)
- D. A. Carson - New Testament Scholar and Emeritus Professor of New Testament
- John S. Feinberg - Chair of the Department and Professor of Biblical and Systematic Theology
- Paul D. Feinberg - Late Professor of Systematic Theology and Philosophy of Religion
- Norman Geisler - Former Chair, Department of Philosophy of Religion (1970-1979)
- Wayne Grudem - Former Chair of Biblical and Systematic Theology department
- Murray J. Harris - Professor Emeritus of New Testament Exegesis and Theology
- James K. Hoffmeier - Egyptologist and professor of Old Testament and ancient near eastern history
- S. Lewis Johnson Jr. - Professor of Biblical and Systematic Theology (1980-1985)
- Douglas J. Moo - New Testament Scholar and former Professor of New Testament (1980-2000)
- John Warwick Montgomery - Professor of Church History (1964-1974)
- Harold A. Netland - Professor of Philosophy of Religion and Intercultural Studies and the Naomi A. Fausch Chair of Missions
- Grant R. Osborne - Late Professor of New Testament and author of The Hermeneutical Spiral
- Clark H. Pinnock - Late Professor of Systematic Theology
- Kevin J. Vanhoozer - Research Professor of Systematic Theology
- Willem A. VanGemeren - Former Professor of Old Testament
- John D. Woodbridge - Research Professor of Church History and the History of Christian Thought
- Keith E. Yandell - Affiliate Professor of Philosophy

== Notable alumni ==
- John F. Ankerberg, host of the "John Ankerberg Show"
- Mark Batterson, lead pastor of National Community Church in Washington, D.C.
- Craig Blomberg, New Testament scholar at Denver Seminary
- Elie Buconyori, founder and President of Hope Africa University and Bishop of the free Methodist church in Burundi and Kenya.
- William Lane Craig, apologist and professor of philosophy at Biola University's Talbot School of Theology
- Chip Edgar, Anglican bishop of South Carolina
- W. Kent Fuchs, former provost of Cornell University and president of the University of Florida
- Walter C. Kaiser, retired president of Gordon-Conwell Theological Seminary
- Joseph Thomas Knott, lawyer and member of the Southern Baptist Convention executive committee
- Dan McConchie, member of the Illinois Senate
- Scot McKnight, noted blogger, author, and New Testament scholar at Northern Seminary
- Douglas J. Moo, New Testament scholar and theologian
- James Moore, historian of science at the British Open University and the University of Cambridge, and visiting scholar at Harvard University
- Mark Noll, noted Christian historian, professor of history at the University of Notre Dame
- Smokie Norful, Grammy winning gospel singer and pianist
- Michael Young-Suk Oh, Executive Director/CEO of the Lausanne Committee for World Evangelization
- Stanley E. Porter, President, Dean, and Professor of New Testament, McMaster Divinity College
- Cecil R. Richardson, former Chief of Chaplains of the United States Air Force
- John D. Robb, chairman of the International Prayer Council
- John Senyonyi, vice chancellor, Uganda Christian University
- Jeffrey Neil Steenson, bishop in The Episcopal Church, became Roman Catholic
- Steven Tighe, Anglican bishop of the Southwest
- Jim Wallis, author, activist, founder and editor of Sojourners
- David Falconer Wells, Distinguished Professor of Historical and Systematic Theology at Gordon-Conwell Theological Seminary
- Danny Yamashiro, chaplain at Massachusetts Institute of Technology (MIT), researcher on American presidents and childhood trauma, and media talk show host
