= Evangelical Theological Society =

Professional society of Biblical scholars, educators, pastors, and students

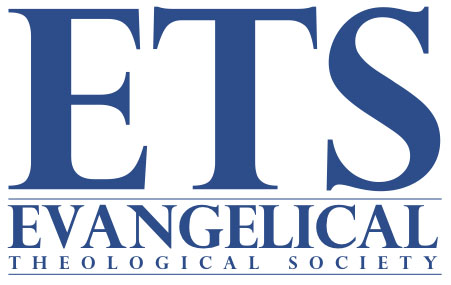
- Abbreviation: ETS
- Founded: December 28, 1949; 76 years ago
- Type: Academic association
- Tax ID no.: 64-0636207
- Legal status: 501(c)(3) nonprofit organization
- Purpose: Evangelical theology
- Location: Scottsdale, Arizona
- President: Craig Blomberg
- Executive Director: Ken Magnuson
- First President: Clarence Bouma
- Publication: Journal of the Evangelical Theological Society (JETS)
- Website: www.etsjets.org

The Evangelical Theological Society (ETS) is a professional society of Biblical scholars, educators, pastors, and students "devoted to the inerrancy and inspiration of the Scriptures and the gospel of Jesus Christ" and "dedicated to the oral exchange and written expression of theological thought and research."

== History ==
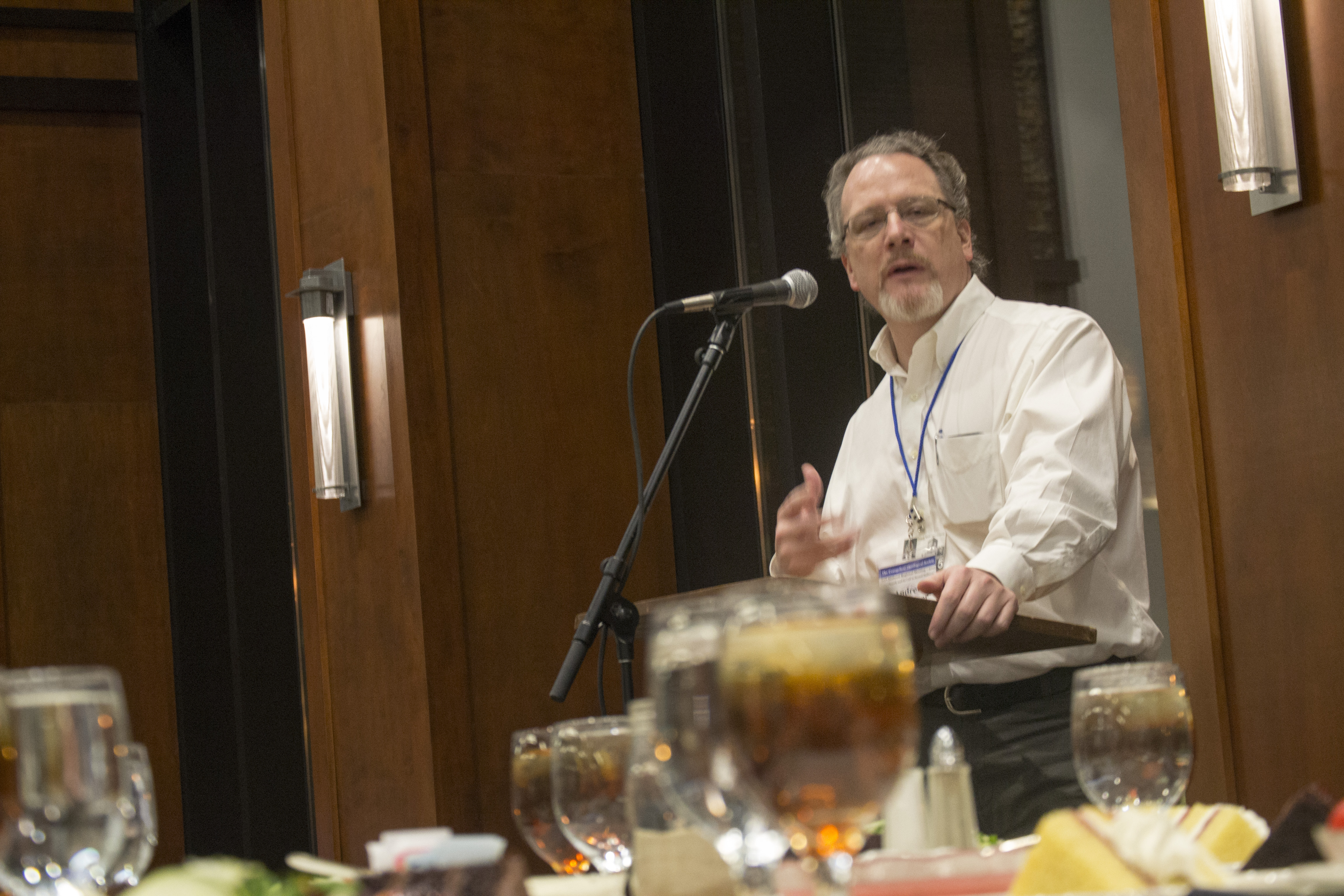
Andrew J. Schmutzer at the 2015 Midwest Regional Meeting

The society was established in 1949 in response to a "keenly perceived need for interaction and wider dissemination of conservative research on biblical and theological issues." The inaugural meeting was held in Cincinnati and was organized by a committee chaired by Edward R. Dalglish of Gordon Divinity School. The group, representing approximately 20 different institutions and denominations, elected Clarence Bouma of Calvin Seminary as its first president.

Several times during its history, the society has been faced with doctrinal controversy. In the 1970s, members became polarized over the precise definition of "inerrancy" (including questions about literal vs. non-literal language and the possibility of scribal errors). In 1983 the society expelled Robert Gundry for his views on the historicity of some of the events in the Gospel of Matthew. In 2003, the society narrowly decided against expelling Clark Pinnock and John E. Sanders for their beliefs about open theism. In 2007, Francis Beckwith resigned as president after he decided to be received into full communion in the Catholic Church. In 2008, Ray Van Neste and Dennis Burk introduced a proposal to further expand the doctrinal statement to include 11 points, but the motion ultimately failed.

== Doctrine ==
When it was initially formed, the society had a single doctrinal basis, biblical inerrancy. Thus, the original doctrinal statement was limited to one sentence: "The Bible alone and the Bible in its entirety is the word of God written, and therefore inerrant in the autographs." It was amended in 1990 to require Trinitarian belief and now includes a second sentence: "God is a Trinity, Father, Son, and Holy Spirit, each an uncreated person, one in essence, equal in power and glory."

== Membership ==
Full, voting membership is available to anyone who has a Ph.D. or Th.D degree, or its equivalent and subscribes to the above doctrinal statements. Interested evangelicals who do not have such a degree can apply for associate membership, without voting rights. There is also a student membership. Members are not limited to specific denominational or theological traditions and not required to be affiliated with particular schools or seminaries. The number of full members in 2010 was nearly 4,200.

== Journal ==
The society produces a quarterly journal, which contains scholarly articles and book reviews from various evangelical perspectives. First published in 1958, as the Bulletin of the Evangelical Theological Society, its name was changed in 1969 to the Journal of the Evangelical Theological Society (JETS).

== Presidents ==
Year	President
1950	Clarence Bouma
1951	Merrill Tenney
1952	Charles Woodbridge
1953	Frank Neuberg
1954	John Walvoord
1955	Harold Barnes Kuhn
1956	Roger Nicole
1957	Ned B. Stonehouse
1958	Warren C. Young
1959	Gilbert H. Johnson
1960	Allan MacRae
1961	R. Laird Harris
1962	Ralph Earle
1963	Vernon Grounds
1964	Burton Goddard
1965	Gordon Clark
1966	J. Barton Payne
1967	Stephen Paine
1968	Kenneth Kantzer
1969	Carl F. H. Henry
1970	Robert E. Cooley
1971	Harold Lindsell
1972	Robert L. Saucy
1973	Arthur H. Lewis
1974	Richard Longenecker
1975	Bruce K. Waltke
1976	Simon J. Kistemaker
1977	Walter C. Kaiser Jr.
1978	Stanley Gundry
1979	Marten Woudstra
1980	Wilber Wallis
1981	Kenneth L. Barker
1982	Alan F. Johnson
1983	Louis Goldberg
1984	Haddon Robinson
1985	Richard Pierard
1986	Gleason Archer
1987	Walter Dunnett
1988	Elmer Smick
1989	James A. Borland
1990	Robert Lewis Thomas
1991	H. Wayne House
1992	Gordon R. Lewis
1993	Gerry Breshears
1994	L. Russ Bush
1995	George W. Knight III
1996	Robert C. Newman
1997	Moisés Silva
1998	Norman Geisler
1999	Wayne Grudem
2000	John H. Sailhamer
2001	Darrell L. Bock
2002	Millard Erickson
2003	David M. Howard
2004	Gregory K. Beale
2005	Craig Blaising
2006	Edwin M. Yamauchi
2007	Francis J. Beckwith
2008	C. Hassell Bullock
2009	Bruce A. Ware
2010	Eugene H. Merrill
2011	Clinton E. Arnold
2012	Paul R. House
2013	Robert W. Yarbrough
2014	Thomas R. Schreiner
2015	Scott B. Rae
2016	Daniel B. Wallace
2017	Sam Storms
2018	David S. Dockery
2019	Michael J. Kruger
2020	Craig S. Keener
2021	R. Albert Mohler, Jr.
2022	D. A. Carson
2023	Timothy George
2024	Karen Jobes
2025	Craig Blomberg
2026	Scott R. Swain
2027	David W. Pao
