= Journal of the Evangelical Theological Society =

- Discipline: Christian theology
- Language: English
- Edited by: Dorian Coover-Cox

Publication details
- Former name: Bulletin of the Evangelical Theological Society
- History: 1958-present
- Publisher: Evangelical Theological Society (United States)
- Frequency: Quarterly

Standard abbreviations
- ISO 4: J. Evang. Theol. Soc.

Indexing
- ISSN: 0360-8808
- OCLC no.: 2244860

Links
- Journal homepage

The Journal of the Evangelical Theological Society (JETS) is a refereed theological journal published by the Evangelical Theological Society. It was first published in 1958 as the Bulletin of the Evangelical Theological Society, and was given its present name in 1969.

== History ==
The journal has been published continuously since 1958. The first issue of the Bulletin contained a single article, Ned B. Stonehouse's presidential address to the society's annual meeting, entitled "The Infallibility of Scripture and Evangelical Progress." In 1969 the publication attained its present title. In 1988 the circulation was approximately 2500; by 2016 it had increased to 5000. The society provides free online access to digitized back issues. For 22 years until 2021, the editor was Andreas J. Köstenberger; Dorian Coover-Cox succeeded him.

== Contents and outlook ==
The Evangelical Theological Society is composed of Christians who affirm the inerrancy of the Bible. The journal is focused predominantly on biblical studies. In its early years, it provided a venue for evangelicals questioning dispensationalism. While at first sympathetic to neo-orthodoxy and the work of Karl Barth, it turned sharply against Barth in the mid-1960s. In 2003, F. LeRon Shults described it as a "major journal of conservative American theology".

== Editors ==
Editors without a direct reference were compiled by referencing the JETS archives.

Year	Editor	Volumes
1958–1959	Stephen Barabas	1–2
1960–1961	John Luchies	3–4
1962–1975	Samuel J. Schultz	5–18
1976–1999	Ronald Youngblood	19–42
2000–2020	Andreas J. Köstenberger	43–63
2021–present	Dorian Coover-Cox	64–present
