= List of Fuller Theological Seminary people =

This list of Fuller Theological Seminary people includes notable current and former faculty of Fuller Theological Seminary as well as alumni of the institution.

== Faculty ==
- Warren S. Brown, director of the Lee Edward Travis Research Institute and professor of psychology in the School of Psychology; principal editor and contributor to Whatever Happened to the Soul?: Scientific and Theological Portraits of Human Nature (1998); editor and contributor to Understanding Wisdom: Sources, Science and Society (2000)
- William Dyrness, dean of the School of Theology 1990–2000, professor of theology and culture
- John Goldingay, professor emeritus of Old Testament
- Joel B. Green, associate dean for the Center for Advanced Theological Studies and professor of New Testament Interpretation
- Veli-Matti Kärkkäinen, professor of Systematic Theology
- Kirsteen Kim, associate dean for the Center for Missiological Research
- Sebastian Kim, professor of theology
- Seyoon Kim, professor of New Testament and former associate dean for Korean Doctor of Ministry Program
- Nancey Murphy, philosopher of science and Christian theologian, known for her works on religion and science, author of Theology in the Age of Scientific Reasoning, winner of prizes from the American Academy of Religion and the Templeton Foundation
- Soong-Chan Rah, professor of evangelism
- J. Dudley Woodberry, dean emeritus and senior professor of Islamic studies
- Amos Yong, professor of theology

== Former faculty ==
- Gleason Archer, influential Biblical scholar and theologian; taught at Fuller 1948–65
- David Augsburger, professor emeritus of Pastoral Care and Counseling (1990–2018), Anabaptist author
- Justin L. Barrett, director of the Thrive Center for Human Development, Thrive Professor of Developmental Science, and professor of Psychology
- Edward John Carnell, author of Introduction to Christian Apologetics, A Philosophy of the Christian Religion, and many other books; seminary President, 1954–59
- Oliver D. Crisp, professor of Systematic Theology; expert in philosophical theology
- Richard J. Foster, former Fuller professor, theologian; author of Celebration of Discipline, named by Christianity Today as one of the "100 Best Religious Books of the 20th Century"
- John Goldingay, David Allan Hubbard Professor of Old Testament
- Paul King Jewett, professor of Systematic Theology
- Charles H. Kraft, linguist and anthropologist; proponent of the Third Wave of the Holy Spirit Movement; Sun-Hee Kwak Professor of Anthropology and Intercultural Communication
- William Sanford La Sor, professor of the Old Testament
- George Eldon Ladd, professor of New Testament exegesis and theology; during a time when dispensationalism held sway over evangelicalism, Ladd was a proponent of the Historic Premillennialist perspective and the "already/not yet" concept of the Kingdom of God
- Joy J. Moore, professor of Biblical Preaching and academic dean at Luther Seminary in St. Paul, Minnesota
- Richard Mouw, influential Christian philosopher, ethicist, author, president of Fuller (1993–2013)
- Richard Muller, professor of Church History/Historical Theology; Calvin and Post-Reformation scholar; teaches at Calvin Theological Seminary
- J. Edwin Orr, professor of missiology, and authority on European and American Protestant Revival movements and history
- William Pannell, professor of evangelism, Arthur DeKruyter/Christ Church Oak Brook Professor of Preaching, and a pioneer in advocating for racial justice within evangelicalism
- Robert N. Schaper, former dean of the Chapel and Arthur DeKruyter/Christ Church Oak Brook Professor of Preaching and Practical Theology
- Lewis B. Smedes, theologian and writer; author of Forgive and Forget; former professor of Theology and Ethics who taught at Fuller for twenty-five years
- Glen Stassen, Christian ethicist, son of Harold Stassen, former Lewis B. Smedes Professor of Christian Ethics at Fuller
- Thomas Talbott, professor of philosophy at Willamette University who is controversial in theological circles for his vigorous defense of the doctrine of Christian universal salvation; taught at Fuller for three years early in his career
- Lee Edward Travis, psychologist and speech pathologist
- Miroslav Volf, influential theologian; Henry B. Wright Professor of Systematic Theology at Yale Divinity School; author of Exclusion and Embrace, named by Christianity Today as one of the 100 most important religion books of the 20th century; taught at Fuller 1991–1998
- C. Peter Wagner, former professor of Church Growth at Fuller Theological Seminary, coined the term "Third Wave;" founder of Global Harvest Ministries, co-founder of the World Prayer Center
- Neil Clark Warren, former dean of the School of Psychology, founder of eHarmony
- Mel White, former professor of Communications and Preaching; infamous within Evangelical Christianity due to his sexuality and ministry to homosexuals following his departure from the Evangelical Protestant movement
- John Wimber, pastor, founder of the Vineyard Movement; directed the Charles E. Fuller Institute of Evangelism and Church Growth 1974–1978, later served as an adjunct professor at Fuller
- Charles Woodbridge, one of the original recruits for the founding faculty, joined in 1950, resigned in 1957 over neo-evangelicalist leanings; president of the Evangelical Theological Society

== Alumni ==
- Augustin Ahimana, bishop of Kivu
- Leith Anderson (D.Min), president of National Association of Evangelicals
- Keith Andrews (D.Min.), bishop of the Diocese of Western Anglicans
- Rob Bell (M.Div), author of Velvet Elvis and Love Wins, founding pastor of Mars Hill Bible Church
- James Brenneman (M.Div), president of Goshen College
- Bill Bright (B.D), founder of Campus Crusade for Christ
- Alexander Chow (M.A.), senior lecturer in Theology and World Christianity at New College, University of Edinburgh
- Samuel Chu (M. Div.), founding executive director of California Faith for Equality, president of One LA-Industrial Areas Foundation, fellow at Center for Religion and Civic Culture at University of Southern California
- Nancy L. DeClaisse-Walford (M.A.), the Carolyn Ward Professor of Old Testament and Biblical Languages at McAfee School of Theology of Mercer University
- Craig Detweiler (M.Div., Ph.D.), filmmaker, author, cultural commentator, professor at Pepperdine University
- Robert Grant, founder of the Christian Voice organization
- Timothy Headington, businessman, film producer, real estate developer
- Bryan Hollon (M.Div.), dean and president of Trinity Anglican Seminary
- Gregory C. Horn, US Navy rear admiral
- Willie James Jennings, associate professor of systematic theology and Africana studies at Yale Divinity School
- Jin Mingri, also known as Ezra Jin, pastor of Zion Church of Beijing in China; received a DMin degree
- Veli-Matti Kärkkäinen (M.A.), author, Finnish theologian, professor of Systematic Theology at Fuller Theological Seminary
- Joon Gon Kim, founder of Korea Campus Crusade for Christ
- Tom Lin (M.A.), current president of InterVarsity Christian Fellowship and the first non-white president
- Laurent Mbanda (M.A.), Rwandan Anglican archbishop and chairman of GAFCON
- John C. Maxwell (D.Min), evangelical Christian author, speaker, and pastor who has written more than 50 books, primarily focusing on leadership
- John Ortberg, teaching pastor of Menlo Park Presbyterian Church, and author of several books including The Life You've Always Wanted and If You Want to Walk on Water, You've Got to Get Out of the Boat
- Les Parrott, Ph.D., professor of clinical psychology for Seattle Pacific University, author, and motivational speaker
- John Piper, chancellor of Bethlehem College and Seminary and pastor of Bethlehem Baptist Church
- John D. Robb, chairman of the International Prayer Council
- Onesphore Rwaje, former Rwandan Anglican archbishop
- Thomas R. Schreiner (Ph.D.), author, New Testament scholar, James Buchanan Harrison Professor of New Testament Interpretation at the Southern Baptist Theological Seminary
- Robert A. Schuller (M.Div.), senior pastor in the Crystal Cathedral and the Hour of Power; author; Robert Schuller Ministries
- Todd H. Speidell (M.Div., Ph.D.), theologian and author
- David H. Stern (M.Div), Messianic Jewish theologian and author; his books include Jewish New Testament Commentary and Messianic Judaism (original title Messianic Jewish Manifesto)
- Miroslav Volf (M.A.), influential theologian, Yale Divinity School professor, director of the Yale Center for Culture and Faith
- Brian Wallace (M.A., D.Miss.), bishop suffragan of the Diocese of Churches for the Sake of Others
- Bruce A. Ware (Ph.D.), author, professor of Christian Theology at the Southern Baptist Theological Seminary
- Rick Warren (D.Min), pastor of Saddleback Church, author of The Purpose Driven Church and the best-selling hardback book in US publishing history, The Purpose Driven Life
- James White, director of Alpha and Omega Ministries
- Anthony C. Yu (S.T.B.), religion and literary scholar, translator of Journey to the West, professor at the University of Chicago
- Anne Zaki (Ph.D.), Egyptian theologian on track to be first female ordained minister in the Middle East
