= Harold Ockenga =

American pastor and academic (1905–1985)

Harold John Ockenga

Personal life
- Born: July 6, 1905
- Died: February 8, 1985 (aged 79)
- Spouse: Audrey (nee Williamson)
- Education: Taylor University Princeton Theological Seminary; Westminster Theological Seminary University of Pittsburgh
- Known for: Neo-Evangelicalism

Religious life
- Religion: Evangelical Christian
- Denomination: Congregational
- Institute: Fuller Theological Seminary Gordon–Conwell Theological Seminary National Association of Evangelicals

Harold John Ockenga (July 6, 1905 – February 8, 1985) was a leading figure of mid-20th-century American Evangelicalism, part of the reform movement known as "Neo-Evangelicalism". A Congregational minister, Ockenga served for many years as pastor of Park Street Church in Boston, Massachusetts. He was also a prolific author on biblical, theological, and devotional topics. Ockenga helped to found Fuller Theological Seminary and Gordon–Conwell Theological Seminary, as well as the National Association of Evangelicals (NAE).

== Early life and education ==
Ockenga was born on July 6, 1905, and raised in Chicago, the only son of Angie and Herman Ockenga. Ockenga's father had German ancestry; the name Ockenga is East Frisian. Harold Ockenga was baptized at Austin Presbyterian Church, and his mother later brought him to Olivet Methodist Episcopal Church, of which he became a member at age eleven. As a teenager, he had a strong sense of God calling him to pastoral ministry. He began his undergraduate education at Taylor University, a then-Methodist institution in Indiana in 1923.

After graduating from Taylor in 1927, Ockenga enrolled as a student at Princeton Theological Seminary but did not complete his theological studies there. In the midst of the "fundamentalist–modernist controversy" facing Christianity in the 1920s, he and many conservative classmates followed those members of the faculty – such as J. Gresham Machen, Robert Dick Wilson and Cornelius Van Til – who withdrew from Princeton to establish the Westminster Theological Seminary in Philadelphia in 1929.

Ockenga graduated from Westminster in 1930, after which he enrolled as a student in philosophy at the University of Pittsburgh to research on Marxism. He was awarded the PhD degree in 1939. During his studies at Pittsburgh he met Audrey Williamson, had a whirlwind courtship, and married in 1935.

== Pastoral career ==
Ockenga began his pastoral ministry in New Jersey, at two Methodist churches. In 1931 he accepted an invitation from Clarence E. Macartney to become a pastoral assistant at the First Presbyterian Church of Pittsburgh. During 1931 both Machen and Macartney recommended Ockenga for the position of pastor at Point Breeze Presbyterian Church, in Pittsburgh. That same year, Ockenga was ordained as a Presbyterian minister, though he had earlier received ordination as a Methodist. In 1936 he was called to be the associate pastor at Park Street Church in Boston.

In 1937, at the death of Park Street's longtime pastor, Arcturus Z. Conrad, Ockenga was appointed his successor. He continued in that post until 1969. During his pastoral career at Park Street, Ockenga delivered many sermons that later formed the substance of various books he wrote. In all he wrote a dozen books dealing with biblical themes, and pastoral commentaries on biblical texts and Bible characters. His congregation thrived during much of his pastorate as he exercised considerable talents as a preacher, evangelist, leader and organizer.

In 1950, Park Street Church hosted Billy Graham's (first mid-century transcontinental) evangelistic crusade, which was regarded as highly successful. On the strength of that event, both Graham and Ockenga then conducted an evangelistic tour of New England. Ockenga later assisted Graham, Nelson Bell and Carl F. H. Henry in organizing the evangelical periodical Christianity Today. He served as chairman of the board of the magazine until 1981.

== Evangelical reformer and leader ==
=== Fundamentalist controversy ===
In addition to his pastoral career and writings, Ockenga became a significant leader in a mid-twentieth-century reforming movement known as Neo-Evangelicalism or the New Evangelicalism. Its roots are found in the theological controversy between Protestant Fundamentalists and Protestant Liberals or Modernists in the earlier part of the twentieth century. Much of the controversy centered on questions of the historicity of the Bible, biblical inerrancy, biblical interpretation, creationism and evolution, and various doctrines such as the deity of Christ, the Virgin Birth of Christ, the Atonement, the bodily resurrection of Christ, and the Second Advent of Christ. The reaction of many Fundamentalists to the influence of liberal Protestant theology and modern secular beliefs was to withdraw from many of the mainline denominations and institutions. In addition, the Fundamentalists believed that anyone, regardless of religious outlook, could be involved with social action and so they wanted to retreat to focus on promoting the "Spiritual Gospel".

However, Ockenga and some other younger and emerging figures inside those churches felt uncomfortable about the militant isolation from culture. Ockenga also believed that Jesus came to deal with the physical well-being of the people he met in addition to their more serious spiritual well-being. Alongside Ockenga were figures such as Carl F. H. Henry, Harold Lindsell, Wilbur M. Smith, and Edward John Carnell.

=== Neo-Evangelical Social Engagement ===
Toward the end of the Second World War, Ockenga founded War Relief and the War Relief Commission (1944) to deal with the situation abroad. He believed that Neo-Evangelicalism would lack credibility if Christians preached only a spiritual Gospel and failed to meet the physical needs of those who desperately needed assistance. War Relief later became World Relief.

=== Neo-Evangelical Education ===
In an effort to address these concerns Ockenga and J. Elwin Wright of the New England Fellowship planned the establishing of a new organization known as the National Association of Evangelicals. Ockenga served as its founding president from 1942 to 1944. Those affiliated with the association were interested in maintaining many of the biblical concerns that militant fundamentalists held to. However they also sought to reform fundamentalism from what they perceived as its anti-cultural and anti-intellectual tendencies.

Another indicator of the effort to reform fundamentalism is located in the efforts of the founding fathers of Fuller Theological Seminary in Pasadena, California. The seminary was initially conceived of as the Evangelical Caltech, where excellence in scholarship would dovetail with faithfulness to orthodox Protestant beliefs, and yield a renovation of western culture from secular unbelief. The seminary would become a launching pad for a new generation of zealous evangelicals who would rigorously engage in critical dialogue with Liberal theology and modern secular thought, as well as cultivating skills in those who would propel mass evangelism and worldwide missions. The principal founding figures of Fuller Seminary included Charles E. Fuller (radio evangelist), Ockenga, Carl Henry, and Harold Lindsell.

The seminary opened in September 1947, and Ockenga was appointed seminary president. However, Ockenga was reluctant to relinquish his pastoral post and so, much to the chagrin of his seminary colleagues, he served as president in absentia from 1947 until 1954. He was succeeded by Edward John Carnell. Ockenga resumed his post as president in absentia from 1960 until 1963 following Carnell's resignation.

This overall movement for reform in fundamentalism, as exemplified in the establishing of the National Association of Evangelicals, Fuller Seminary and Christianity Today magazine, came to be known as Neo-Evangelicalism. A part of the movement was its opposition to Roman Catholicism, a concern that Ockenga embraced. For example, he was one of the thirty or so leaders who met for a strategy session with Billy Graham in mid-August 1960 in Montreux, Switzerland, to plan how the movement could best oppose the candidacy of Senator John F. Kennedy for the presidency that year. They planned a meeting for the new National Conference for Citizens for Religious Freedom the following month in Washington. Ockenga was one of the spokesmen for the group, whose initial gathering on September 7 was pilloried by the media as the "Peale Group," after its chairman, the champion of positive thinking, Norman Vincent Peale. The term may or may not have been coined by Ockenga, but in 1948 at the Civic Auditorium in Pasadena his speech gave birth to the movement.

In the foreword to The Battle For the Bible by Harold Lindsell, Ockenga further defined the term neo-evangelicalism:

Neo-evangelicalism was born in 1948 in connection with a convocation address which I gave in the Civic Auditorium in Pasadena. While reaffirming the theological view of fundamentalism, this address repudiated its ecclesiology and its social theory. The ringing call for a repudiation of separatism and the summons to social involvement received a hearty response from many Evangelicals. ... It differed from fundamentalism in its repudiation of separatism and its determination to engage itself in the theological dialogue of the day. It had a new emphasis upon the application of the gospel to the sociological, political, and economic areas of life.

== Later career ==
The first sixteen years of work at Fuller Theological Seminary witnessed the development of two views among staff and students: conservative and progressive evangelicalism. Among the conservatives, such as Ockenga, Henry, Lindsell and Smith, there was some concern that others such as David Hubbard, Paul Jewett and Daniel Fuller held to a different view of biblical inerrancy.

Those who differed with the conservatives held to a vision for progressive thought among evangelicals on theological, biblical and ethical issues. With Ockenga's final departure from the role of president in absentia, the seminary shifted into a different phase of growth under the direction of those identified with progressive thinking.

Much of the history of these tensions between conservatives and progressives is discussed in George Marsden's history of the seminary.

When Ockenga retired from Park Street Church in 1969 he was appointed president of Gordon College and Divinity School. His desire was to recreate on the U.S. East Coast something of the essence of what had been planned for Fuller seminary. In the late 1960s, therefore, Ockenga entered into negotiations to merge two institutions: Gordon Divinity School and the Conwell School of Theology. He collaborated with people such as J. Howard Pew, Billy Graham and Walter Martin in establishing Gordon–Conwell Theological Seminary. Ockenga served as its president from 1970 to 1979, with figures like Walter Martin sitting on the seminary's board.

== Personal life and death ==
Ockenga married Audrey Williamson in 1935, and together they had three children. Ockenga died of cancer in Hamilton, Massachusetts, on Friday, February 8, 1985.

== Legacy ==
At Ockenga's funeral service on Monday, February 11, 1985, was an old friend: Billy Graham. "He was a giant among giants," Graham reflected. "Nobody outside of my family influenced me more than he did. I never made a major decision without first calling and asking his advice and counsel. I thank God for his friendship and his life."

Ockenga was an American evangelical pastor and educator associated with the development of post–World War II evangelicalism. In 1947, he coined the term new evangelicalism which became associated with a movement that sought greater engagement with American culture and intellectual life. Ockenga helped establish several evangelical institutions, including the National Association of Evangelicals, Fuller Theological Seminary, and Gordon-Conwell Theological Seminary, where he held leadership positions. He served as pastor of Park Street Church in Boston from 1936 to 1969 and was active in evangelical missions and educational initiatives. Ockenga also participated in the founding of Christianity Today and served as chairman of its board for 25 years. He maintained a close association with evangelist Billy Graham and influenced a number of evangelical leaders through his pastoral, educational, and organizational work.

== Works ==
=== Books ===
- Ockenga, Harold J. (1937). These Religious Affections. Grand Rapids, MI: Zondervan.
- ——— (1938). Our Protestant Heritage. Grand Rapids, MI: Zondervan.
- ——— (1940). Have You Met These Women?. Grand Rapids, MI: Zondervan.
- ——— (1942). Every One That Believeth. New York: Fleming Revell.
- ——— (1944). The Comfort of God. New York: Revell.
- ——— (1947). The Spirit of the Living God. New York: Revell.
- ——— (1948). Faithful in Christ Jesus. New York: Revell.
- ——— (1956). The Church in God. Westwood: Revell.
- ——— (1957). Protestant Preaching Through Lent. Grand Rapids, MI: Eerdmans.
- ——— (1959). Power Through Pentecost. Grand Rapids, MI: Eerdmans.
- ——— (1962). The Epistles to the Thessalonians. Proclaiming the New Testament. Grand Rapids, MI: Baker. OCLC 7362341.
- ——— (1962). Women Who Made Bible History. Grand Rapids, MI: Zondervan.

=== Articles ===
- ——— (June 1952). "The Church's Standard of Moral Purity, part 1". Eternity. 3 (6): 5–12.
- ——— (July 1952). "The Church's Standard of Moral Purity, part 2". Eternity. 3 (7): 20–22.
- ——— (August 1954). "The World Challenge to the Churches". Eternity. 5 (8): 6–13.

== See also ==
- Evangelicalism in the United States
