= Carl F. H. Henry =

American theologian (1913–2003)

- Born: Carl Ferdinand Howard Henry; January 22, 1913
- Died: December 7, 2003 (aged 90)
- Education: Boston University; Northern Baptist Theological Seminary; Wheaton College
- Theological work
- Tradition or movement: Evangelicalism, progressive fundamentalism
- Notable ideas: Presuppositional apologetics

Carl Ferdinand Howard Henry (January 22, 1913 – December 7, 2003) was an American evangelical Christian theologian who provided intellectual and institutional leadership to the neo-evangelical movement in the mid-to-late 20th century. He was ordained in 1942 after graduating from Northern Baptist Theological Seminary and went on to teach and lecture at various schools and publish and edit many works surrounding the neo-evangelical movement. His early book, The Uneasy Conscience of Modern Fundamentalism (1947), was influential in calling evangelicals to differentiate themselves from separatist fundamentalism and claim a role in influencing the wider American culture. He was involved in the creation of numerous major evangelical organizations that contributed to his influence in Neo-evangelicalism and lasting legacy, including the National Association of Evangelicals, Fuller Theological Seminary, Evangelical Theological Society, Christianity Today magazine (of which he was the founding editor), and the Institute for Advanced Christian Studies. The Carl F. H. Henry Institute for Evangelical Engagement at Southern Baptist Theological Seminary and the Carl F. H. Henry Center for Theological Understanding at Trinity International University seek to carry on his legacy. His ideas about Neo-evangelism are still debated to this day and his legacy continues to inspire change in American social and political culture.

== Early life ==
Henry grew up in Long Island, New York, as the son of German immigrants, Karl F. Heinrich and Johanna Vaethroeder (Väthröder). After his high school graduation in 1929, he began working in newspaper journalism.

In 1932, at the age of 19, he became editor of The Smithtown Times and later a stringer for The New York Times. The next year, after becoming a Christian, he decided to go to college to begin a life of Christian service.

== Family ==
His wife, Helga Bender Henry, wrote a book in 1955 about the Union Rescue Mission in Los Angeles. In 1999, she published Cameroon on a Clear Day about her parents' work in that country.

Their son, Paul B. Henry, was a U.S. Representative from Michigan from 1985 to his death in 1993. They also had a daughter, Carol Henry Bates.

== Education ==
Frank E. Gaebelein, then headmaster of The Stony Brook School, gave him a catalogue to the evangelical liberal arts Wheaton College. He enrolled in 1935, where he was greatly influenced by the philosophical teaching of Gordon Clark. While at Wheaton, Henry also taught typing and journalism. There he met Helga, a missionary kid, whom he married in August 1940. He received both bachelor's and master's degrees from Wheaton. He then earned a Doctor of Theology degree from Northern Baptist Theological Seminary. Henry was ordained as a Baptist minister in 1942. He also earned a PhD from Boston University in 1949.

== Teaching career ==
Henry taught at Northern Baptist Theological Seminary from 1942 to 1947. Also in 1942, Henry took part in launching the National Association of Evangelicals, serving on its board for several years and being book editor of their magazine United Evangelical Action.

In 1947, Henry joined with Harold Ockenga, Harold Lindsell, Edward John Carnell, and radio evangelist Charles E. Fuller to help establish Fuller Theological Seminary in Pasadena, California. He served as acting dean in the seminary's first year and remained there as a professor until he left to establish Christianity Today magazine.

In 1949, Henry was part of the meeting of evangelical scholars who discussed the need for an organization "to promote serious academic discussion," and suggested the name adopted by the resulting organization: the Evangelical Theological Society.

Henry taught as a visiting professor or guest lecturer at colleges, universities, seminaries, and conferences across the United States and around the world, including in Japan, Singapore, India, Liberia, South Korea, Yugoslavia, the Philippines, the Netherlands, and Romania. These institutions include the Asian Center for Theological Studies and Mission, Bethel University (Minnesota), Christian Theological Seminary, Columbia Bible College, Denver Conservative Baptist Seminary, Gordon Divinity School (which is now known as Gordon-Conwell Theological Seminary), Hillsdale College, Hong Kong Baptist College (which is now called Hong Kong Baptist University), Latin American Theological Seminary, Soongsil University, Eastern Baptist Theological Seminary (now renamed as Palmer Theological Seminary), The Southern Baptist Theological Seminary, Trinity Evangelical Divinity School, and Winona Lake Summer School of Theology. He also served as the chairman for international conferences and consultations, including the World Congress on Evangelism in Berlin in 1966.

In 1973, Henry became lecturer-at-large at World Vision International. In the early 1980s Henry was a founding board member of the Institute on Religion and Democracy, with which he remained active until the mid-1990s.

== Writing and editing career ==
His first book was Remaking the Modern Mind, 1946. His second book, The Uneasy Conscience of Modern Fundamentalism, 1947, is a critique that rejects modern liberalism and preserves a doctrinal focus on the Bible but also rejects the rigidness and the disengagement of Fundamentalists. The book firmly established Henry as one of the leading Evangelical scholars.

In 1956, Henry became the first editor-in-chief of the magazine Christianity Today, which was founded by evangelist Billy Graham to serve as a scholarly voice for evangelical Christianity and a challenge to the liberal Christian Century. He was the magazine's editor until 1968.

Henry's magnum opus was a six-volume work, God, Revelation, and Authority, which was completed in 1983. He concluded "that if we humans say anything authentic about God, we can do so only on the basis of divine self-revelation; all other God-talk is conjectural." His magnum opus presented a version of Christian apologetics called presuppositional apologetics. Henry regarded all truth as propositional, and Christian doctrine as "the theorems derived from the axioms of revelation."

== Influence on neo-evangelicalism ==
Henry was one of the most influential figures in the development of Neo-Evangelicalism, which emerged in the 1940s and 1950s as a response to the fundamentalist-modernist controversies of the early 20th century. Henry sought to create a new movement that would combine orthodox Christian theology with broader cultural engagement rather than just within Christianity. David F. Wells considered Henry's belief in the authority of scripture and the importance of God as the foundation of Christianity to have helped to recover a more biblically grounded theology than the theological liberalism of the early 20th century.

Henry's influence would likely not have had as far of a reach without for his founding of the evangelical magazine Christianity Today and his work in establishing Fuller Theological Seminary and Trinity Evangelical Divinity School. Neo-evangelism in the years after Henry's influence has started to become more about conservatism and culture wars, but his legacy has inspired some neo-evangelists in recent years to promote a shift in emphasis to social justice and a broader assessment of cultural and political issues beyond concerning only conservatism.

== Death ==
Henry died in 2003 in Watertown, Wisconsin at the age of 90.

== Critical assessments ==
As with any theologian, Henry had people who criticized his work and beliefs. One such critic is Stanley Hauerwas, a theologian who believes similarly to Henry that society ought to be formed around Christian ethics but disagreed with the way Henry wants to go about it. Hauerwas writes "Carl Henry, for example, has developed a highly sophisticated model of cultural influence, which assumes that if Christians can only become successful in the worlds of scholarship, journalism, and the arts, then they will be able to reassert the Christian vision in a society that has largely forgotten it. But Henry's vision, no matter how sophisticated, is ultimately one of assimilation, and in the end, that is no more than capitulation to the dominant culture." Hauerwas goes on to argue that the church's main goal is not to change the world, but to be a faithful witness to the gospel of Jesus Christ. He argues that the church's role is to promote a way of life that is characterized by love, hospitality, and forgiveness, rather than by power and success.

Another critic of Henry was David F. Wells, who agreed with some of Henry's theology but also disagreed with Henry's idea of cultural engagement and argued that Henry's focus on defending Christian truth was not effective with the current culture. Wells viewed Henry's approach to be too narrow and not addressing the broader cultural and social issues facing society.

George M. Marsden critiques Henry's book The Uneasy Conscience of Modern Fundamentalism (1947) by calling to a good critique of fundamentalism that helped to create a new focus for evangelicalism, which emphasized broader cultural engagement. However, Marsden also argues that Henry's critique was limited by his own theological and cultural biases. He considers Henry to be blinded by his social and cultural context as an outsider to fundamentalism and therefore put a greater influence on cultural engagement than other evangelicals might.

=== Works ===
- "The Pacific Garden Mission" (Zondervan, 1942)
- Remaking the Modern Mind (Eerdmans, 1946)
- The Uneasy Conscience of Modern Fundamentalism (Eerdmans, 1947)
- The Evangelical Pulpit (Eerdmans, 1948)
- The Protestant Dilemma (Eerdmans, 1948).
- The Drift of Western Thought (Eerdmans, 1951)
- Christian Personal Ethics (Eerdmans, 1957)
- Contemporary Evangelical Thought (Channel Press, 1957) (editor)
- Evangelical Responsibility in Contemporary Theology (Eerdmans, 1957)
- Revelation and the Bible (Baker, 1958) (editor)
- Basic Christian Doctrines (Baker, 1962)
- Evangelicals at the Brink of Crisis (Word, 1967)
- Faith at the Frontiers (Moody, 1969)
- Evangelicals in Search of Identity (Word, 1976)
- God, Revelation and Authority, 6 vols. (Word, 1976–83).
- The Christian Mindset in a Secular Society (Multnomah, 1984)
- Christian Countermoves in a Decadent Culture (Multnomah, 1986)
- Confessions of a Theologian: An Autobiography (Word, 1986)
- Twilight of a Great Civilization (Crossway, 1988)
- Evangelical Affirmations (Zondervan, 1990) (editor, with Kenneth Kantzer)

== See also ==
- Evangelicalism in the United States
- Christian Fundamentalism

== Sources ==
- Joel A. Carpenter, ed. Two Reformers of Fundamentalism: Harold John Ockenga and Carl F. H. Henry (New York: Garland, 1988).
- D. A. Carson and John D. Woodbridge, eds. God and Culture: Essays in Honor of Carl F. H. Henry (Grand Rapids: William B. Eerdmans/Carlisle: Paternoster, 1993).
- G. Wright Doyle, Carl Henry: Theologian for All Seasons (Eugene, Oregon: Pickwick Publications, 2010).
- Matthew Hall and Owen Strachan, Essential Evangelicalism: The Enduring Influence of Carl F. H. Henry. (Crossway, 2015).
- George Marsden, Reforming Fundamentalism: Fuller Seminary and the New Evangelicalism (Grand Rapids: William B. Eerdmans, 1987).
- Eric J. Miller, "Carl F. H. Henry and Christianity Today: Responding to the 'Crisis of the West,' 1956–1968," M.A. Thesis, Trinity Evangelical Divinity School, 1994.
- James DeForest Murch, Cooperation without Compromise: A History of the National Association of Evangelicals (Grand Rapids: William B. Eerdmans, 1956).
- R. Albert Mohler, Jr., "Carl F. H. Henry," in George, Timothy and David S. Dockery, eds. Theologians of the Baptist Tradition, 279-96 (Nashville: Broadman & Holman Publishers, 2001).
- Bob E. Patterson, Carl F. H. Henry (Waco: Word, 1984).
- Purdy, Richard A (1980), The Rational Apologetic Methodology of Carl F. H. Henry in the Context of the Current Impasse between Reformed and Evangelical Apologetics (PhD dissertation), New York University.
- ——— (1993), "Carl F. H. Henry", in Elwell, Walter A (ed.), Handbook of Evangelical Theologians, Grand Rapids: Baker, pp. 260–75.
- William C. Roach, Hermeneutics as Epistemology: A Critical Assessment of Carl F. H. Henry's Epistemological Approach to Hermeneutics (Eugene: Wipf & Stock, 2015)
- R. C. Sproul, John Gerstner and Arthur Lindsley, Classical Apologetics (Grand Rapids: Zondervan, 1984).
- Gregory Alan Thornbury, Recovering Classic Evangelicalism: Applying the Wisdom and Vision of Carl F. H. Henry (Wheaton: Crossway, 2013).
