= Alan Heatherington =

American conductor (born 1945)

Alan Heatherington (born 1945) is one of the leading orchestra conductors in Illinois. He has conducted and/or played with virtually all of the major orchestras in the Chicago area. He was the music director of Ars Viva Symphony Orchestra, the Lake Forest Symphony Orchestra and the Chicago Master Singers, and is music director emeritus of all three ensembles.

== Early life and education ==
Heatherington grew up in Rochester, New York. He began his musical training at age five, first in piano and later in violin, voice, and conducting. While still in high school, he studied at the Eastman School of Music in Rochester, New York. He later turned down a scholarship at Eastman to attend Houghton College in New York and Trinity Evangelical Divinity School in Bannockburn, Illinois (now part of Trinity International University). He received a Master of Music degree from Northwestern University in 1974. While at Northwestern, he studied conducting under Margaret Hillis and Bernard Rubenstein and violin under Chicago Symphony Orchestra concertmaster Samuel Magad, winning the honors competition.

== Early professional career ==
Heatherington made his debut at Carnegie Hall with the Delft Trio in 1981. He conducted the Chicago String Ensemble from 1977 until 1995.

Heatherington has taught extensively at colleges and universities. He taught Biblical studies, theology and music at Moody Bible Institute from 1969 to 1979. From 1981 to 1986, he was director of orchestral conducting and string instruction at the State University of New York at Buffalo. From 1982 to 1987 he was concertmaster and assistant conductor of the Missouri Symphony Society. In 1988, he became associate professor of music at North Park University, remaining there until 1993. He has been a visiting professor at Northwestern University and DePaul University.

From 1995 to 2003, he was director of music ministries at the First Presbyterian Church in Lake Forest, Illinois. He was conductor of the professional choir at Anshe Emet Synagogue in Chicago from 1992 to 2000. He was the artistic director and co-conductor with Weston Noble and Alice Parker of the Innsbruck International Choral Festival from 2000 to 2004. He was music director of the Ars Viva Symphony Orchestra from 1995 to 2014 and the Lake Forest Symphony from 2000 to 2013, and is music director emeritus of both orchestras. For 31 years he served as music director of the Chicago Master Singers (1989-2020), leading the internationally acclaimed chorus in hundreds of Chicago area performances and on 13 European concert tours in England, France, Switzerland, Italy, Austria, Germany, Czech Republic, Poland, Russia, Estonia, Latvia, Lithuania, Croatia, Slovenia, Hungary and the Netherlands.

He has been engaged as guest conductor of the Chicago Symphony Orchestra (“members of” concerts); Chicago Civic Orchestra, Chicago Chamber Orchestra, Hollywood Studio Orchestra, Northwest Indiana Symphony Chamber Orchestra, Buffalo Philharmonic, the New Philharmonic, Traverse Symphony, Light Opera Works, Skokie Valley Symphony, Northbrook Symphony, Mozart Orchester Salzburg, National Gallery Orchestra in Washington DC, West Bohemia Symphony Orchestra, Czech National Symphony Orchestra, North Czech Philharmonic, Ural Philharmonic Orchestra, Krakow Opera, and the youth orchestras of Buffalo, Omaha, McHenry County and the Illinois Music Educators Association.

Heatherington has conducted in most of the major cultural capitals of Europe, including London, Paris, Amsterdam, Rome, Florence, Milan, Venice, Vienna, Salzburg, Prague, Budapest, St. Petersburg, Yekaterinburg, Tallinn, Riga, Berlin, Munich, Warsaw, Krakow, Ljubljana and Zagreb.

== Current positions ==
In 2013, Heatherington resumed his seminary studies, earning a Diploma in Anglican Studies from Nashotah House Theological Seminary in Nashotah, Wisconsin in 2014. He was ordained Priest in the Anglican Church in North America in February, 2017, and was the founding vicar of Grace Anglican Fellowship in Lake Forest, Illinois. He now serves as Vicar of Resurrection Anglican Fellowship (Diocese of Quincy, Bishop Juan Alberto Morales) in Libertyville, Illinois (ResurrectionAnglicanFellowship.org).

== Awards and critical acclaim ==
Heatherington is considered to be among the leading choral and orchestral conductors in Chicago. He is also a professional violinist. He is known for bringing a microphone on stage and delivering an impromptu introduction and commentary on one or more of the pieces the orchestra is performing.

John von Rhein, formerly the Chicago Tribune's classical music critic, reporting on an Ars Viva concert, wrote that "Heatherington knows precisely what he wants and has the leadership skills to bring his musical ideas alive through a solid ensemble that includes numerous Chicago Symphony players in key positions."

In 2005, Maestro Heatherington was named the Conductor of the Year by the Illinois Council of Orchestras. He was named by the Chicago Tribune as a Chicagoan of the Year for 2004. In 2006, the Lake Forest Symphony, which he then directed, was named Illinois Orchestra of the Year by the Illinois Council of Orchestras. In 2010 he received the Cultural Leadership Award, the highest honor bestowed by the Illinois Council of Orchestras, for "sustained leadership, extending beyond his own organizations and community, that has profoundly impacted the state of the Arts in Illinois." He received the Distinguished Achievement Award from the Chicago Classical Review in 2013 and was honored by the Steinway Society of Chicago "for notable and distinguished contribution to the arts."
