= Trinity International University =

Christian college in Bannockburn, Illinois, US

Coordinates: 42°11′43.0″N 87°52′49.8″W

- Former names: Swedish Bible Institute of Chicago (1897–1925); Norwegian-Danish Bible Institute and Academy (1910–????); Swedish Evangelical Free Church Bible Institute and Seminary (1925–1949); Trinity Seminary and Bible Institute (????–1949); Trinity Seminary and Bible College (1949–1961); Trinity Evangelical Divinity School and Trinity College (1961–1995)
- Motto: Entrusted with the Gospel
- Type: Private (includes Seminary and Law School)
- Established: 1897
- Religious affiliation: Evangelical Free Church of America
- President: Eric Halvorson
- Students: 852 (2024)
- Undergraduates: 140 (2024)
- Location: 2065 Half Day Road Bannockburn, IL 60015, Bannockburn, Illinois, U.S.
- Campus: 111 acres (45 ha); Suburban
- Colors: Blue & White
- Website: www.tiu.edu

Trinity International University (TIU) is a private Christian university previously headquartered in Bannockburn, Illinois, United States. It comprised Trinity College, a theological seminary (Trinity Evangelical Divinity School), and a law school (Trinity Law School which was located in Santa Ana, California). The university also maintained campuses in North Lauderdale, Florida, and Miami. TIU was the only university affiliated with Evangelical Free Church of America in the United States and enrolled 1,242 students. On February 17, 2023, TIU announced it was moving the undergraduate program to online modalities only and closed the residential campus at the end of the Spring 2023 semester. The online undergraduate program closed at the end of the Spring 2024 semester.

In April 2025, it was announced that the divinity school would merge with Trinity Western University and cease operations at the Bannockburn campus, while the rest of the university would continue to operate independently. After this change, the law school and an undergraduate program jointly operated with the Wisconsin Department of Corrections will remain the main operations of TIU.

== History ==
Tracing its roots to 1897, TIU formed in the late 1940s as the result of a merger of two schools:

- A school run by the Swedish Evangelical Free Church, founded in 1897 in Chicago, and incorporated as the Swedish Bible Institute of Chicago, then affiliated with Moody Bible Institute as the Swedish Department until 1925 when it became the Swedish Evangelical Free Church Bible Institute and Seminary.
- A three-year Bible school, the Norwegian-Danish Bible Institute and Academy, founded in 1910 by the Norwegian-Danish Free Church, established in Rushford, Minnesota, and later moving to Minneapolis and becoming Trinity Seminary and Bible Institute.

By 1949, the Minneapolis-based school moved to Chicago and the unified schools became known as Trinity Seminary and Bible College. In 1961, the school moved to a new campus in Bannockburn, Illinois, and a year later was renamed Trinity Evangelical Divinity School (TEDS) and Trinity College. The school grew from an enrollment of 51 in 1961 to 1,400 in 1990. In 1995, TEDS became part of Trinity International University, along with Trinity College in Deerfield, Illinois, and Trinity College in Miami, (formerly Miami Christian College which was obtained through a merger of the two institutions). In 1997, Trinity Law School, located in Santa Ana, California, was incorporated into Trinity International University, and the Trinity Graduate School was founded.

In 2014, David S. Dockery was elected unanimously as the 15th president of Trinity. He was inaugurated in October of that year. Nicholas Perrin was elected as the 16th president in June 2019. Kevin Kompelien succeeded Perrin as president on April 1, 2024. On July 1, 2025, David W. Pao was named interim president to serve for a year of transition.

Trinity Graduate School closed in 2024, along with the academic programs at TIU-Florida. Trinity College Online closed in May 2025. Trinity Evangelical Divinity School was acquired by Trinity Western University in 2026. The undergraduate program for prisoners in Fox Lake, Wisconsin, and Trinity Law School both remain open.

== Approvals, accreditations and memberships ==
Trinity International University is accredited by the Higher Learning Commission. The divinity school is also programmatically accredited by the Commission on Accrediting of the Association of Theological Schools in the United States and Canada (ATS).

TIU's law school, located in Santa Ana, California, is accredited by the Committee of Bar Examiners (CBE) of the State Bar of California (CALBAR). The normative nationwide USDE- and CHEA-approved accreditor of law schools is the American Bar Association (ABA). Within the state of California, though, law schools are also accredited by CALBAR CBE, which is neither USDE- or CHEA-approved. Graduates of non-ABA accredited programs are not recognized outside of the state of California. TIU's Trinity Law School (Santa Ana campus only) is also included as part of TIU's regional accreditation by the USDE- and CHEA-approved NCA-HLC.

Trinity International University is exempt from the need to be approved to operate in Illinois by the Illinois Board of Higher Education (IBHE), which lists it as a "private NFP (not-for-profit) institution". Its educational programs for K-12 teachers are approved by the Illinois State Board of Education (ISBE) so that TIU's graduates from said programs may obtain state-issued teaching credentials. TIU is, further, approved by the Illinois Student Assistance Commission (ISAC) (formerly the Illinois State Scholarship Commission (ISSC)) Monetary Award Program (MAP) so that TIU's students may receive Illinois educational grants and scholarships.

Prior to 2003, TIU's athletic trainer program was accredited by the Commission on Accreditation of Allied Health Education Programs (CAAHEP); however in 2003 the accreditation of such programs was taken over by the Joint Review Committee on Athletic Training (JRC-AT); and in 2006 JRC-AT became the Committee for Accreditation of Athletic Training Education (CAATE). TIU's undergraduate athletic training educational program claims CAATE accreditation on its website.

TIU is also a member of the Council for Christian Colleges and Universities (CCCU), the Christian College Consortium (CCC), and the Christian Adult Higher Education Association (CAHEA).

== Athletics ==
The Trinity International athletic teams were called the Trojans. Prior to the move to an all-online undergraduate academic format in 2023, the university was a member of the National Association of Intercollegiate Athletics (NAIA), primarily competing in the Chicagoland Collegiate Athletic Conference (CCAC) for most of its sports from 1996–97 until its move after 2022–23; while its football program competed in the Mideast League of the Mid-States Football Association (MSFA). They were also a member of the National Christian College Athletic Association (NCCAA), primarily competing as an independent in the North Central Region of the Division I level.

Trinity International competed in nine intercollegiate varsity sports. Men's sports included baseball, basketball, football, soccer and volleyball. Women's sports included basketball, soccer, softball and volleyball.

In 2022, women's volleyball claimed the NCCAA D1 National Championship, making the title a program first and last.

== Notable faculty ==
- Carl F H Henry Systematic Theology
- Kenneth Kantzer Theology
- Wilbur M. Smith Bible Exposition
- Gleason Archer Old Testament
- Walter Kaiser Old Testament
- Elmer Towns Religious Education and Evangelism
- John Warwick Montgomery
- Paul Feinberg Systematic Theology
- Norman Geisler Philosophy
- John D. Woodbridge Church History
- D.A. Carson New Testament
- Douglas Moo New Testament
- William Lane Craig Philosophy
- John Feinberg Systematic Theology
- Kevin Vanhoozer Theology
- Wayne Grudem New Testament
- Paul G. Hiebert Missiological anthropologist
- Tite Tiénou Research Professor of Theology of Mission
- Harold Netland Philosophy of Religion, Missions
- Richard Longenecker New Testament
- Mark Noll Church History
- Clark Pinnock Systematic Theology
- John Gerstner Church History
- Barry J. Beitzel Old Testament
- Harold O. J. Brown Systematic Theology
- Murray J. Harris New Testament
- Craig Ott Professor of Mission and Intercultural Studies

== Notable alumni ==
- Randall Balmer, Episcopal priest and John Phillips Professor in Religion, Dartmouth College
- Ron Butler, television actor and comedian
- Galen Carey, Vice President for Government Relations, National Association of Evangelicals
- Lazarus Chakwera, sixth president of Malawi
- Herb Coleman, American player of gridiron football
- Paul Copan, Christian theologian, analytic philosopher, apologist, and author. Currently professor at the Palm Beach Atlantic University and holds the endowed Pledger Family Chair of Philosophy and Ethics.
- Norman Ericson, biblical scholar; Emeritus Professor at the Wheaton College
- W. Kent Fuchs, President, University of Florida
- Brian Hagedorn, attorney and judge; Justice of the Wisconsin Supreme Court
- Karl Hankton, American player of gridiron football
- Alan Heatherington, orchestra conductor and music director of several Chicago-area choirs and orchestras
- Lincoln Hurst, biblical scholar, film historian; Emeritus Professor, University of California
- Bill Hybels, founder of Willow Creek Community Church in Barrington, Illinois.
- Sarah McCammon, journalist and author
- John Senyonyi, Vice Chancellor, Uganda Christian University
- Jeffrey Neil Steenson, coordinator for Episcopal priests and laypeople seeking to become Roman Catholics within a personal ordinariate
- Danny Yamashiro, chaplain at Massachusetts Institute of Technology (MIT), researcher on American presidents and childhood trauma, and media talk show host
