= Christian Faith Recordings =

Defunct American record label

Christian Faith Recordings 78rpm label, by the Dooley Family singing "It's Your Life"

Christian Faith Recordings was an American record label based in California that specialized in mainstream Christian music in the 1950s and 1960s. It was one of the most significant producers of Christian music in the United States during that time.

== History ==
The Christian Faith label was produced by Alma Records, Inc., founded and owned by Hugh Edwards and his wife beginning approximately in 1953 with a Los Angeles address. The company had begun marketing releases by February 1954. Christian Faith changed their address to Reseda in 1957. Sometime later they relocated to the Northridge neighborhood, but continued to use old label stock indicating the previous address. Christian Faith used a convoluted system for the album catalog numbers, intended to give the impression that their output was significantly greater than fact, to the confusion of discographers. However, by 1961 there were more than 100 albums in the label's then-current offerings. Christian Faith developed a marketing plan in which records were sent to dealers at less than the regular wholesale price if the dealer accepted automatic shipments of new releases, with the dealer retaining the right to send back unsold records for full refund. The label was distributed internationally by Pathway Press. The label was sold to Sing Recording Company in 1967.

== Repertoire ==
Christian Faith specialized in "sacred" music, both instrumental and vocal, as well as Country and Western, gospel, children's and Christmas music. Dramatic readings were also released. The label also marketed a line of Spanish and Swedish language albums. Christian Faith's top-selling artist was Rudy Atwood, who represented the label at trade shows. Another prolific artist at Christian Faith was theatre organist Paul Carson, whose releases often had a custom label.

== Artists ==
Prominent Christian artists who recorded for Christian Faith include:

- Rudy Atwood, pianist
- Ralph Carmichael
- Paul Carson, organist
- Redd Harper
- Haven of Rest Quartet
- Old Fashioned Revival Hour Quartet
- Millie Pace Trio
- Marcy Tigner
- Wesley Tuttle
- Lorin Whitney
- Fern Jones Album "The Joneses Sing"
- Ray Robles, Barítono, Álbum: Cantos de Alabanza, Pureza y Poder.
