= Wilbur Nelson =

American Protestant minister, singer, and broadcaster

- Born: September 25, 1910; Brighton, Colorado, US
- Died: August 22, 2003 (aged 92); Laguna Woods, California, US
- Education: Pilgrim Bible College; D.D. (hon.), Talbot School of Theology
- Known for: Morning Chapel Hour radio broadcast
- Spouse: Ethyl Nelson (m. 1936–2000)
- Writings: If I were an Atheist; The Confident Christian; Inferior Feelings — is this your problem?
- Congregations served: Grace Church, Huntington Park, California; Metropolitan Bible Church, Paramount, California

Wilbur Eugene Nelson (September 25, 1910 – August 22, 2003) was an American Christian radio broadcaster, church minister, gospel singer and composer, and published author. He produced and hosted the nationally-syndicated Morning Chapel Hour radio program in the 1940s–1990s. In addition to pastoring churches in California, he sang as a tenor soloist throughout his career. Nelson's radio ministry continues today, now known as Compassion Radio.

== Early years ==
Nelson was born in Brighton, Colorado, on September 25, 1910. He attended Pilgrim Bible College in Colorado Springs, Colorado, before moving to California. He attended the old Country Church of Hollywood in the 1930s, where he married his wife, Ethyl, in 1936.

== Singing career ==
A talented tenor, Nelson sang in a quartet at the Country Church of Hollywood in the 1930s, later singing on the popular Old Fashioned Revival Hour radio broadcast in the early 1940s. Pianist Rudy Atwood, who frequently accompanied Nelson on the program, praised him as "one of the truly great singers of our day", writing, "Whether he sings the old hymns, or the contemporary gospel songs, his magnificent voice and dedicated life is a blessing to people everywhere". Among his many singing roles, Nelson sang at Billy Graham's crusade in Los Angeles in 1949, while pastoring Grace Church in Huntington Park, California.

== Church ministries ==
Nelson was founder and pastor of Grace Church of Huntington Park, California, in the 1940s–1950s, which advertised itself as the "Singing Church". While pastoring Grace Church, he also held open-air summer tent meetings drawing thousands, the Los Angeles Times reported in 1949, publishing a photo of Nelson, shirtsleeves rolled up, driving tent stakes into the ground. The goal, he said, was to overcome the "summer slump in church attendance". Nightly meetings were held in the 500-seat tent, which he called "The Canvas Chapel".

For two years, Nelson led the Youth for Christ movement in Long Beach, California, one of the largest at the time on the West Coast, and organized and conducted their mass rallies at the Hollywood Bowl. Known as the "singing evangelist", Nelson both sang and preached at his church, as well as when making frequent guest appearances at other churches.

In the 1960s–1970s, Nelson was minister at Metropolitan Bible Church in Paramount, California, in addition to continuing to make singing appearances as a soloist.

== Morning Chapel Hour ==
While pastoring the Grace Church of Huntington Park, Nelson founded the Grace Evangelistic Association to produce a daily half-hour radio program, The Morning Chapel Hour, beginning in 1944 on KGER in Long Beach, California. The broadcast was eventually syndicated to radio stations around the United States and internationally. In later years, it was also carried by the Bible Broadcasting Network during the 1970s–1990s. On each broadcast, a choir sang gospel hymns, often as backup with Nelson singing lead, preceding a short devotional message given by Nelson to encourage and comfort listeners. The program's motto was, "Songs and Thoughts that Lift the Heart". He made guest singing and speaking appearances at churches and special events around the country, such as the Western Pennsylvania Bible Conference in June 1974.

As the program's popularity grew, Nelson extended its international outreach. In the early 1950s, for example, the Morning Chapel Hour broadcast sponsored the building of the Evangel Children's Home in Hong Kong, a Christian orphanage for refugee children from mainland China. He also built a 2,000-seat chapel/auditorium for Isabelle Christian School for Girls in Pusan, Korea. The auditorium was named "Nelson Hall" in his honor.

== Recordings and published works ==
Recordings made by Nelson and the Morning Chapel Hour singers include: The Morning Chapel Hour: Wilbur Nelson and the Chapel Singers on the Word Records label, Great Day!, Memory Melodies, and O Come, O Come Immanuel: Songs of the Savior's Birth, a self-produced album of Christmas music performed by the Morning Chapel Hour singers accompanied by orchestra and directed by Nelson. On the latter album's liner notes, Nelson wrote of the Morning Chapel Hour music: "A diligent effort has been made since the program began to present Gospel music in a way which leads the listener to an experience of reverence as well as listening pleasure ... with the prayer that it may bring cheer and blessing".

Nelson wrote several books, including some of his song arrangements and collected meditations given on the Morning Chapel Hour broadcast over the years, among them:

- If I were an Atheist
- The Confident Christian
- Inferior Feelings — is this your problem?
- Anecdotes and illustrations
- Believe & behave
- Singing faith: souvenir selections from the Morning Chapel Hour
- Talks on the Holy Spirit: a series of radio messages presented on The Morning Chapel Hour

== Later years and legacy ==
Nelson received honorary doctorates from Talbot School of Theology and Pusan National University in Korea. The National Religious Broadcasters honored Nelson with their "Award of Merit" and "Milestone Award".

Nelson died on August 22, 2003, at age 92 in Laguna Woods, California. He was predeceased by his wife, Ethyl, who died in November 2000. Their son, Norman (1939–2017), then took over the radio ministry and later renamed the broadcast Compassion Radio, shifting its focus away from music and inspirational sermons to emphasize overseas needs and missionary work. He recalled that his father in later years deplored the way some evangelicals had become politicized, instead of being focused on Christ. Compassion Radio continues to be produced as an over-the-air syndicated radio program as well as a podcast in 2025, under current president Bram Floria.
