= Lorin Whitney =

American organist and recording studio owner (1914–2007)

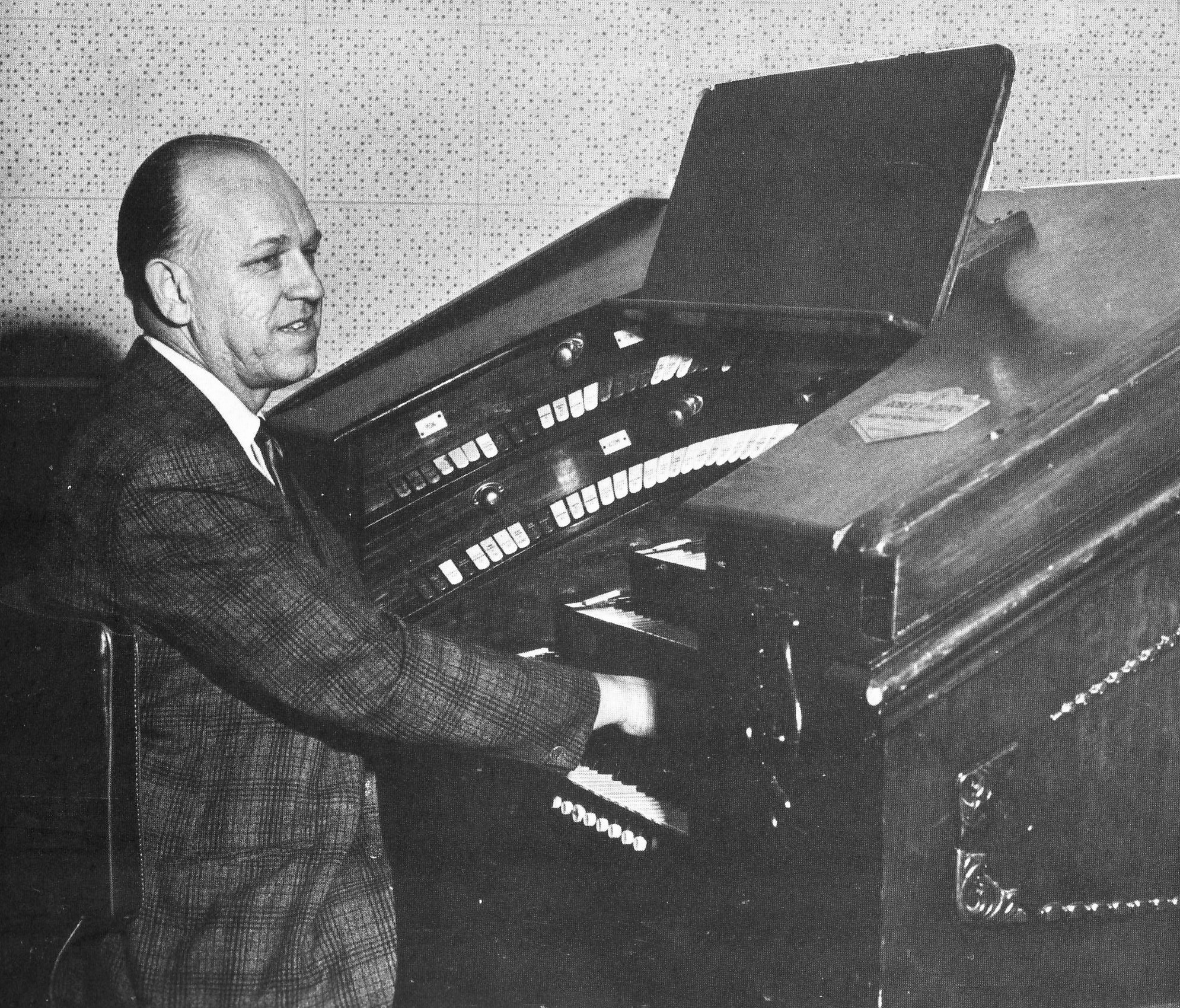
- Lorin Whitney at the console of his studio's Robert Morton pipe organ
- Born: September 11, 1914; Madera, California, US
- Died: August 29, 2007 (aged 92)
- Education: Fresno State College; Southern California Bible College
- Known for: organist Founder, Whitney Recording Studios
- Spouse: Aimee Whitney (m. March 17, 1937)

Lorin J. Whitney (September 11, 1914 – August 29, 2007) was an American organist and recording artist who played on Christian radio programs such as the Haven of Rest in the 1930s–1950s. His organ music programs were heard on the CBS Radio and NBC Blue Networks in the 1930s. He founded the Whitney Recording Studio in Glendale, California, in 1957, where he had a pipe organ installed. His studio organ was used for recordings by Whitney and other organists, along with furnishing accompaniment for singers. The studio accommodated large orchestras and was widely used by various entertainers to record secular music albums in the 1960s–1990s. After the studio was acquired by MCA in 1978, the MCA Whitney studio was used largely for popular music recordings.

== Early years ==
Whitney was born on September 11, 1914, in Madera, California, the son of David and Caroline Whitney. His father was a truck driver. Whitney became a born again Christian at age 11 while attending an Assemblies of God church. As a youth, Whitney played trombone at church and in his high school's band in Fresno where he also played football. He began taking piano lessons at age 14 and advanced rapidly, soon studying organ under prominent theater organist Jesse Crawford. Whitney then attended Fresno State College for a year, before transferring to Southern California Bible College (now Vanguard University).

== Career as an organist ==
As a 20-year-old college student in 1934, Whitney became organist on the Haven of Rest radio program, heard by millions on the coast-to-coast broadcast until 1958. Whitney was on other Los Angeles area stations at various times in the 1930s, including KNX (AM), KFI, KHJ (AM), and KGER. His organ music program on KFI was also picked up by the NBC Blue Network. During World War II, Whitney worked nights at Lockheed Aircraft's Vega plant in Burbank, assembling wings for the Lockheed Hudson A-29 bomber, then doing the daily Haven of Rest program in the mornings with little sleep. In the 1940s, he was organist at Youth for Christ rallies in the Los Angeles area for ten years, along with pianist Rudy Atwood, and at Billy Graham's Los Angeles Crusade in 1949. He began making organ recordings on the Sacred Records label beginning in 1945 and also had a program of organ music on the CBS Radio network. Whitney later played organ at Graham's crusades between 1958–1960, as well as on the evangelist's Hour of Decision radio program. Whitney played organ on a nightly half-hour radio program on a Los Angeles station, KHOF-FM, in the late 1950s–1960s. He continued to perform as a solo organist in concert appearances and as an accompanist for various singers in the 1970s.

== Whitney Recording Studio ==
In 1957, Whitney built the Whitney Recording Studio in Glendale, and installed a Robert Morton theater organ he had acquired from the Fox Theatre in Redwood City, California. Initially, the 1928-vintage instrument had a 3-manual console and 14 pipe ranks. Whitney expanded it with additional Wurlitzer pipes and an enlarged console, resulting in a 4-manual, 34-rank pipe organ. The organ was heard on Whitney's own radio programs, as well as used by a number of other organists to make recordings, and as backup for a number of singers. In its earlier years, the Lorin Whitney Recording Studio was predominately used to record Christian albums and radio broadcasts, such as Haven of Rest, World Vision, and The Quiet Time, a 15-minute program of sung hymns and organ played by Whitney, along with a spoken meditation by Albert Salter. Whitney promoted the use of his studio by other radio ministries based in the Los Angeles area to produce records on his Angelus label for their listening audiences, such as the duet of John and Linnie Olson on the Trans World Missions broadcast.

The studio sound stage was large enough to accommodate a 60-piece orchestra. A wide variety of musicians recorded at the studio including Frank Zappa, Captain Beefheart, Jesse Crawford, Barry White and his 40-piece orchestra, Aretha Franklin, and Pat Benatar. One of the studio's first major customers was Walt Disney Productions. Actor Tom Bosley used the studio early in his career to produce an audition tape for announcing and voice acting roles, before his casting as the familiar Howard Cunningham character on the Happy Days television series in the 1970s–1980s. In 1958, the studio was an early pioneer in developing a solid state mixing console. The studio's array of tape duplicating machines and multi-channel recording capabilities resulted in increasing use by rock music performers.

Whitney sold the studio to MCA in 1978, but continued his association with the studio for another five years as a consultant. By 1981, the MCA Whitney Recording Studio was producing 12 albums annually, using a 16-track recording setup, and the majority of recording work was no longer predominantly religious.

== Discography ==
Whitney made a large number of recordings between the 1940s–1980s, many on the Sacred Records, Christian Faith Recordings, and Angelus labels, playing sacred music organ solos and as accompanist for various soloists and ensembles, such as George Beverly Shea and the Haven of Rest Quartet. Among these are:

- Lorin Whitney plays the Hi-Fi pipe organ
- Songs that touch the heart
- Songs of the Christian faith
- Dinner Devotionals, volumes one and two
- Lorin Whitney plays songs everybody loves
- Lorin Whitney plays Christmas carols
- Now I belong to Jesus
- Lorin Whitney, pipe organ, Bud Tutmarc, Hawaiian guitar
- Vere Raley with Lorin Whitney Musical Ensemble
- Precious memories
- Crew of the good ship grace, Haven of Rest Quartet
- I'd Rather Have Jesus, George Beverly Shea, soloist
- Unto the Hills

== Personal life ==
Whitney married Aimee Hill on March 17, 1937. They had a daughter, Joan, and a son, Eugene. When their son married in September 1968, at a Baptist church in Pomona, California, Whitney played the wedding music. After living in Glendale, they retired to Newport Beach when Whitney's studio was sold to MCA. In retirement, the couple enjoyed travel and boating. Whitney died at age 92 on August 29, 2007.
