= Marcy Tigner =

American Christian children's entertainer

- Marcy Tigner with "Little Marcy"
- Born: Marcellaise Hartwick; August 24, 1921; Wichita, Kansas, US
- Died: May 17, 2012 (aged 90); Redmond, Oregon, US
- Occupation(s): Christian ventriloquist, recording artist
- Years active: 1958–1982

Marcy Tigner (born Marcellaise Hartwick, August 24, 1921 – May 17, 2012) was an American Christian children's entertainer, who released numerous albums for several prominent Christian record labels in the mid-1960s through the early 1980s. She used her natural voice, which had a very unnatural childlike quality. She developed the Little Marcy ventriloquist's doll to aid her performances to give a congruent visual aid to match her voice, and thus toured the United States for several years under the Little Marcy guise for evangelistic crusades and solo concerts. Her last album appeared in 1982, after which she made a few local appearances in Oregon. By the mid-1990s she was entirely retired, but it was about this time that record collectors specializing in "weird" music brought about a re-interest in her output.

== Biography ==
Hartwick was born to Perry and Erma Berkey Hartwick in Wichita, Kansas on August 24, 1921. Tigner's first instrument was the piano, but she switched to trombone subsequent to hearing a performance of gospel music on the instrument. She accomplished some proficiency on the trombone, winning performance contests at various levels. Her family moved to Oregon, where she played trombone in the Portland Junior Symphony and graduated from Portland's Grant High School. She studied music at the University of Oregon, graduating from there. As a youth her voice was mocked, and she attempted to train her voice, which was un-naturally strident of a high register, through formal voice lessons but these failed and she put her energies into the trombone. In 1946 she was briefly a resident of Albany, Oregon. She married Malcolm Everett Tigner in 1942, with whom she had two daughters, and settled in the Eugene, Oregon area.

Tigner's first recordings were as a trombonist, made with organist and prolific Christian recording artist Lorin Whitney. Slightly later she released a solo trombone album for the Christian Faith label.

Tigner's first record to utilize her childlike voice was released September 1960, made for Cornerstone Records and entitled Happy Day Express: Sing With Marcy. Despite only four months' circulation, it was the tenth-best selling religious record of 1960. Tigner commenced a tour to promote the album, but she felt ill-at-ease performing as a grown-up woman while performing children's songs with her decidedly immature voice. She became acquainted with Vonda Kay Van Dyke, who would later be Miss America 1965, while working on the film Teenage Diary. Van Dyke encouraged her to study Paul Winchell's book on ventriloquism. By April 1961 a doll named Little Marcy was created by the same dollmaker who made Charlie McCarthy, based on Tigner's specifications of herself as a small child, and this doll became so popular through personal appearances that Tigner's name was dropped and further recordings and appearances were simply credited to "Little Marcy." Tigner made Little Marcy recordings for many of the most significant Christian record labels, including Singcord, Word, and Zondervan. She had a weekly radio show at KWIL in 1965. At the peak of her output she was releasing 5 albums of original material a year, and sales figures were respectable by even secular standards. These albums were repeatedly repackaged as budget albums and for other Christian labels such as Chapel Records. In addition to strictly Christian material, Little Marcy released recordings which would otherwise receive the approval of her Christian base, including a 1969 fire-safety record in which she is partnered with Smokey Bear.

Tigner's output curtailed towards the end of the 1970s. The last original Little Marcy album, Little Marcy and Mother Goose Go to Church, was released in 1982. By 1982 she was residing in North Hollywood, California. In the mid-1980s Tigner and the Little Marcy doll made some personal appearances in Oregon, where she and her husband lived, for the next few years. The last Little Marcy products were two short films produced by Tyndale House in the late 1980s intended for Christian cable channels.

Tigner's husband died in 2007. She was living in Redmond, Oregon, where she died on May 17, 2012.

== Style and legacy ==
Little Marcy's output was decidedly Christian in outlook, usually of a directly evangelical nature. Her voice was squeaky-high, like that of a small child. After Little Marcy fame hit, she continued her trombone performances alongside her ventriloquism. When Tigner performed as "Little Marcy" at churches she told religious stories through the doll in addition to singing. Tigner was able to modulate her speaking voice to sound more adult.

Tigner released more than 40 albums as "Little Marcy", and resulting sales were more than 2 million copies in total. She was awarded a gold disc.

In addition to the numerous LP records, Little Marcy books, toys, and other paraphernalia was produced. Her books were published by Harvest House and Word Books with titles such as Little Marcy Visits the Farm and Little Marcy's Favorite Bible Stories. Tigner's personal appearances drew upwards of 2000 children, at one occasion in 1971 an appearance originally scheduled for four performances was expanded to ten in order to meet demand. She wrote at least two cantatas for children, "The Jesus Story" and "Noah's Ark", the latter in collaboration with Joe Rizzo.

Tigner's popularity re-ascended in the mid 1990s. She was re-discovered by junk-shop vinyl enthusiasts, who sought the recordings for their novelty value. The Little Marcy version of "Join the Gospel Express" appeared on a 1994 compilation entitled Incredibly Strange Music, but perhaps the most sought-after recordings by collectors of this genre are "I Love Little Pussy" and "Devil, Devil, Go Away!" Following her death a special version of the KWVA program Sunday Morning Hangover focusing on Little Marcy's career was broadcast on June 3, 2012.
