= Mark Labberton =

American pastor and academic

Clifford L. Penner Presidential Chair of Fuller Theological Seminary
- In office July 1, 2013 – January 21, 2023
- Preceded by: Richard Mouw
- Succeeded by: David Emmanuel Goatley

Personal details
- Born: Washington
- Education: Whitman College (BA); Fuller Theological Seminary (MDiv); Cambridge University (PhD)
- Profession: University administrator

Mark Labberton was the Clifford L. Penner Presidential Chair at Fuller Theological Seminary from 2013 to 2023. Before he became Fuller's president, he served for 16 years as senior pastor of the First Presbyterian Church of Berkeley, California.

== Early life and education ==
Having grown up in Yakima, Washington, Labberton states that he was raised in a home that disdained religion. Labberton embraced Christianity during his undergraduate years at Whitman College. After earning his bachelor's degree he went to Fuller for his Masters of Divinity. He earned a Ph.D. in theology from the University of Cambridge.

== Career ==
He was ordained in the Presbyterian Church (USA) and served in pastoral ministry for three decades.

In 1983, he co-founded (with Stephen A. Hayner) the Christian International Scholarship Foundation, now called Scholar Leaders.

He joined Fuller Seminary in 2009 and served as its president from 2013 to 2022.

== Family ==
He is married to Janet Morrison Labberton.

== Works ==
=== Books ===
- Labberton, Mark (2007). The Dangerous Act of Worship: Living God's Call to Justice. Downers Grove, IL: InterVarsity Press. ISBN 9780830833160.
- Labberton, Mark (2012). The Dangerous Act of Loving Your Neighbor; Seeing Others Through the Eyes of Jesus. Downers Grove, IL: InterVarsity Press. ISBN 9780830838400.
- Labberton, Mark (2014). Called: The Crisis and Promise of Following Jesus Today. Downers Grove, IL: InterVarsity Press. ISBN 9780830836833.

=== As editor ===
- ———, ed. (2018). Still Evangelical?. Downers Grove, IL: InterVarsity Press. ISBN 978-0830880423.
