= George N. H. Peters =

American Lutheran minister and author

- Born: November 29, 1825; New Berlin, Pennsylvania, United States
- Died: October 9, 1909 (aged 83)
- Occupation: Minister
- Spouse: Caroline Hersheiser

George N. H. Peters (November 30, 1825 – October 7, 1909) was an American Lutheran minister and author of The Theocratic Kingdom. His premillennial views were in conflict with the majority of Lutherans who held amillennial beliefs.

== Biography ==
George Nathaniel Henry Peters was born on November 30, 1825, in New Berlin, Pennsylvania, to Isaac Cyrus Peters and Magdalene Miller. He moved with his family to Springfield, Ohio, at the age of ten. He enrolled in Wittenberg College in 1846. Difficulty with his eyes from a gunpowder burn required him to take a break from school during his junior year, but he returned and graduated in 1850.

In Mansfield, Ohio, around 1853, he met and married his wife, Caroline Hersheiser. They had two sons, Edgar Edwards Peters (born 1854) and Charles Cyrus Peters. He served as treasurer of the Wittenberg Synod from 1853 to 1858. He was a member of the board of directors of Wittenberg College from 1855 to 1859. Wittenberg College awarded him an honorary Doctor of Divinity degree in 1907.

Peters died on October 7, 1909, at the age of 83.

== Published work ==
In 1884, Peters' major work, The Theocratic Kingdom—a three-volume defense of non-dispensational premillennial theology—was published for the first time, by Funk and Wagnalls; it was reprinted in 1952 and 1972. In the preface of the 1952 edition, Wilbur M. Smith calls it "the most exhaustive, thoroughly annotated and logically arranged study of Biblical prophecy that appeared in our country during the nineteenth century."
