= Institute for Advanced Christian Studies =

American foundation

The Institute for Advanced Christian Studies (IFACS) was an American foundation, founded by theologian Carl F. H. Henry in 1967, for the purpose of encouraging evangelical Protestant scholars to pursue their academic work from a distinctively Christian worldview. Henry's ultimate goal was to establish a high-caliber, doctorate-granting Christian research university.

IFACS was established with funding from the Lilly Endowment and received support from other organizations, such as the Billy Graham Evangelistic Association. It attempted to establish headquarters near a major American university, but was unable to do so. In 1986, Mary Stewart VanLeeuwen described the low profile of the organization: "Far from having a physical plant, paid faculty, or support staff, IFACS has only a post office box in Chicago and a rotating board of Christian scholars working in both secular and Christian academic institutions."

Despite its minimalist operations, IFACS sponsored conferences, books, and other projects by evangelical scholars over its 35 years of operation. Grantees included Samuel H. Moffett, Nicholas Wolterstorff, and Ronald Sider.

IFACS closed in 2002.
