= Galen Carey =

Galen Carey is the Vice President of Government Relations for the National Association of Evangelicals (NAE), a United States-based organization. Carey is responsible for representing the NAE before Congress, the White House and the courts. He works to advance the approach and principles of the NAE document, "For the Health of the Nation: An Evangelical Call to Civic Responsibility." Before joining the NAE staff, Carey was a longtime employee of World Relief, the relief and development arm of the NAE. thumb While at World Relief, he was known as a leading evangelical voice on refugee, immigration, and international relief and development issues. His work included directing housing reconstruction, livelihoods rehabilitation, agriculture and community health projects. Most recently he was based in Bujumbura, Burundi and worked as the Regional Program Advisor for the World Relief Great Lakes Region establishing an HIV/AIDS network and worked as the Regional Program Advisor.

In November 2009, Carey signed an ecumenical statement known as the Manhattan Declaration calling on evangelicals, Catholics and Orthodox not to comply with rules and laws permitting abortion, same-sex marriage and other matters that go against their religious consciences.

Carey was named to the Trinity International University's Wall of Honor in 2009.
