= James Brenneman =

American academic administrator

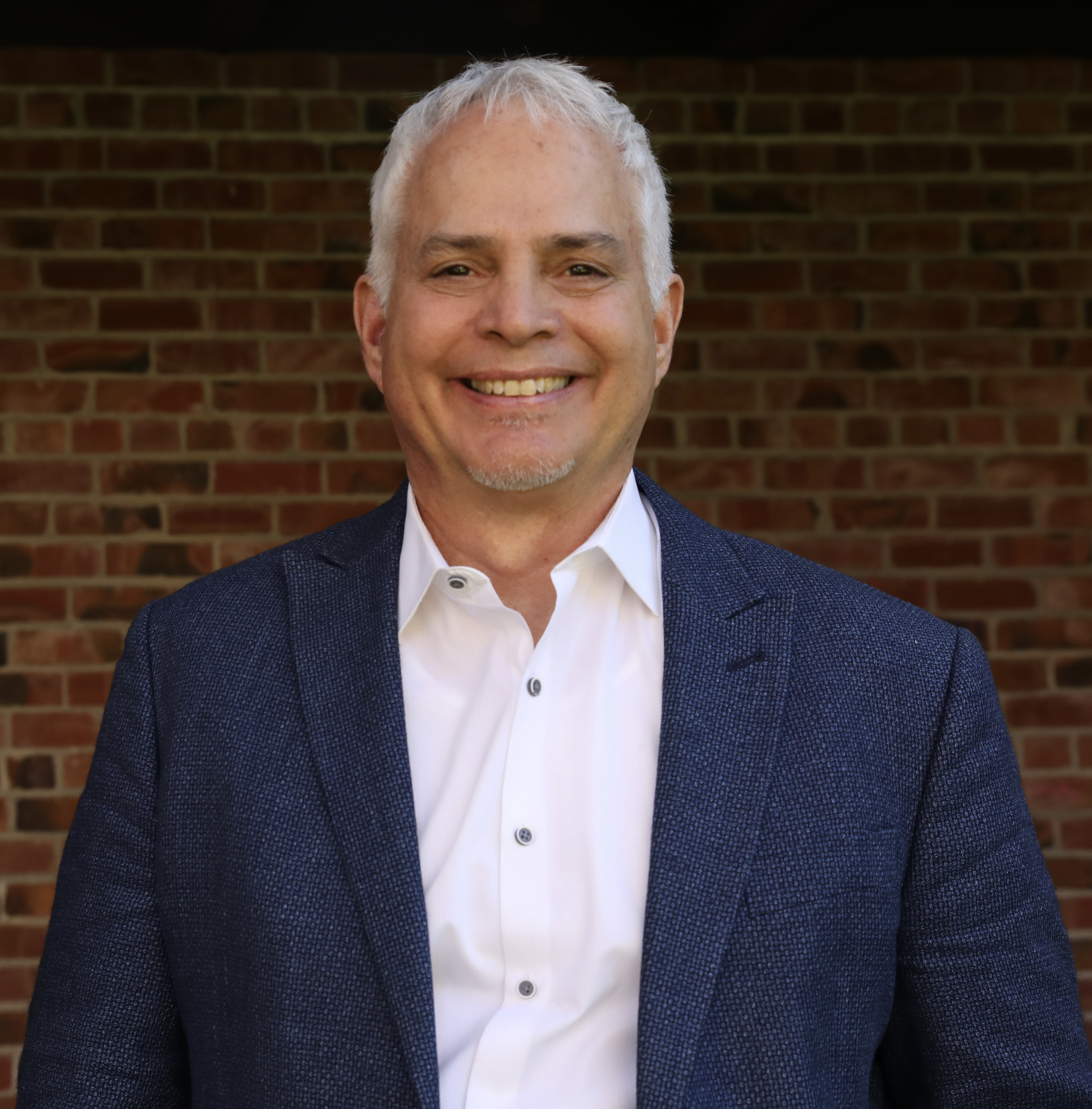
James E. Brenneman, president of Berkeley School of Theology

James E. Brenneman is the president of Berkeley School of Theology, Berkeley, CA, one of the founding seminaries of the Graduate Theological Union. Prior to coming to Berkeley School of Theology in 2017, Jim was the twelfth president of Goshen College, Goshen, Indiana from 2006 to 2017.

== Biography ==
Originally from Kalona, Iowa, Jim grew up attending school and church in Ybor City, the Cuban quarter of Tampa, Florida. Jim is an ordained Mennonite minister and was the founding and lead pastor of Pasadena Mennonite Church (Pasadena, CA) from 1986-2006. He also served on the faculty of the Episcopal Theological School at Claremont for 15 years, where he taught Hebrew Bible. He lived in South Pasadena, CA for 26 years prior to moving to Goshen, Indiana in 2006, returning to CA in 2017. He and his wife, Terri J. Plank Brenneman, a clinical psychologist, have one son, Quinn Miguel Plank Brenneman. On December 31, 2006, Brenneman was selected by the Elkhart Truth to be one of the "Ten People to Watch in 2007".

== Education ==
Brenneman is a 1977 graduate of Goshen College where he pursued an interdisciplinary B.A. degree combining Bible, biology, and natural science. He also attended the Associated Mennonite Biblical Seminary and graduated with an M.Div. from Fuller Theological Seminary in 1982. At Claremont Graduate University he earned a Master of Arts degree in religious studies in 1991 and a Ph.D. with a focus in Hebrew Bible, in 1994.

== Published works ==
Jim is the author of On Jordan’s Stormy Banks: Lessons from the Book of Deuteronomy (Herald Press, 2004) and Canons in Conflict: Negotiating Texts in True and False Prophesy (Oxford University Press, 1997), along with many articles and chapters in scholarly, academic, and pastoral publications.
