= Daniel Fuller =

American theologian (1925–2023)

Daniel Payton Fuller (August 28, 1925 – June 21, 2023) was an American theologian and professor of hermeneutics. Fuller was the son of radio evangelist Charles E. Fuller, co-founder of the Fuller Theological Seminary.

== Life and career ==
Fuller was born on August 28, 1925, in Los Angeles, California, the only child of Charles E. Fuller and Grace Payton Fuller. After graduation from South Pasadena High School in 1943, Fuller enlisted in the United States Navy and became a commissioned officer. He was discharged in 1946. He was ordained at Immanuel Baptist Church in Pasadena, California. He served as Assistant Pastor at Park Street Church, Boston, Massachusetts, from 1949 to 1950.

Fuller held the title of Professor Emeritus of hermeneutics at Fuller Theological Seminary, where he taught from 1953 to 1993 and served as Dean of the School of Theology from 1963 to 1973. Additionally he served as President of the Gospel Broadcasting Association and the Fuller Evangelistic Association.

Fuller was a graduate of the University of California at Berkeley and Fuller Theological Seminary. He held the Doctor of Theology degrees from Northern Baptist Seminary and from the University of Basel in Switzerland.

In 2005, Fuller was honored at an awards convocation for 50 years of service to the seminary.

His papers from 1928 to 2000 are held in the archives and special collections of the Fuller Theological Seminary.

Fuller was married with four children. He died on June 21, 2023, at the age of 97.

== Theology and influence ==
Fuller wrote Gospel and Law: Contrast or Continuum? in 1980. Paul Rainbow argues that he "sent shock waves throughout the bastions of Reformed theology by asserting that there is 'an inseparable connection between faith and resulting works' such that 'the Bible sometimes speaks of faith and sometimes of works when it speaks of the condition to be met' for salvation." Fuller argued for a radical continuity between Old Covenant and New Covenant economies, and rejected the antithesis between law and gospel. His view was critiqued by Meredith Kline, O. Palmer Robertson, and Robert Godfrey.

Fuller had a significant influence on John Piper, who studied under him at Fuller Seminary. In his foreword to Fuller's 1992 book The Unity of the Bible: Unfolding God's Plan for Humanity, Piper wrote, "No book besides the Bible has had a greater influence on my life than Daniel Fuller's The Unity of the Bible."

== Selected writings ==
- The Unity of the Bible: Unfolding Gods Plan for Humanity, Zondervan (May 1992) ISBN 0-310-53300-7
- Gospel and Law: Contrast or continuum?: The Hermeneutics of Dispensationalism and Covenant Theology, Eerdmans (1980) ISBN 0-8028-1808-0
- "Give the Winds a Mighty Voice: The Story of Charles E. Fuller", Word Books, Waco (1972). ISBN 978-1498207157
