= Norman Ericson =

American scholar and academic

Norman R. Ericson
- Born: Norman Raymond Ericson; July 21, 1932; Loomis, Nebraska, United States
- Died: December 22, 2011 (aged 79); Johnson Health Care Center, Carol Stream, Illinois, United States
- Education: University of Chicago; University of Nebraska; Trinity International University
- Occupations: Teacher, Bible scholar
- Years active: 1957-2000
- Spouse: Ruth Peterson (m. 1954)
- Children: 4

Norman R. Ericson (July 21, 1932 – December 22, 2011) was an American teacher and Bible scholar.

== Early life and education ==
Ericson was born on July 21, 1932, in Loomis, Nebraska, United States to Raymond and Myrtle Ericson.

He had his early education in Holdrege, Nebraska after his family moved there. In 1950, he attended Chicago's Trinity Seminary and Bible College (now Trinity International University in Deerfield, Illinois) for two years. He was the choir president in his second year. Ericson then transferred the University of Nebraska to finish his BA degree.

He married Ruth Peterson from Minnesota in 1954 at the First Evangelical Free Church in Chicago. Peterson and Ericson first met in Trinity International University. He also took up Bachelor of Divinity from Trinity Evangelical Divinity School where he graduated on May 31, 1957. He also previously took an Associate of Arts degree in the same school from 1950 until he graduated in 1952.

== Career ==
Ericson began teaching Biblical and Hellenic studies at what was then Trinity College in Chicago, Illinois in 1957. He was appointed as a professor at Trinity Evangelical Divinity School where he became a full-time faculty of the said institution in September 1974. He was a popular instructor among his students as he effectively communicated with them at all levels of the academic experience. He also gave each of his students one a sense of being his principal focus. While almost all the courses he taught were relating to New Testament Studies, he also enjoyed teaching ancient Hellenic and Old Testament courses. One of his significant contributions he made in the scholarship of Biblical studies was his work on the interpretation of the Old Testament in the New Testament. This area of interest goes back to his work on his doctoral thesis in Biblical Studies at the University of Chicago. His presentation at the Evangelical Theological Society on the topic was an important contribution. He also concentrated his scholarship on the Petrine epistles of the New Testament, 1st Peter, 2nd Peter, and Jude. Additionally, he was known for his teaching of the Gospel of John and the books of James and Hebrews in the New Testament. While an evangelical theologically, he also taught the importance of knowing and engaging scholarship from New Testament criticism.

He was awarded his PhD in Biblical Studies from the University of Chicago Divinity School in 1972.

Dr. Ericson was a professor at Wheaton College in Wheaton, Illinois. He started there in 1977 as a Professor of New Testament Studies. He then later served as the chair of the Department of Bible, Theology, and Archeology. He also served as a senior translator and consulting editor of New Living Translation Study Bible, which aides people in enhancing the study of the bible through study experience with maps, a word study system, recommendations for further reading, visual aids, and profiles of bible characters. He also taught New Testament and Greek courses at Wheaton College and its Graduate School.

He also served as adjunct professor at Northern Baptist Theological Seminary in Lombard, Illinois. One of his most influential articles, entitled "The NT Use of the OT: A Kerygmatic Approach," was presented at the Evangelical Theological Society.

Ericson retired from teaching in 2000, concluding 43 years in his chosen profession.

=== Bible translator ===
Timeline of Norman R. Ericson Teaching at Trinity
Position	Tenure
Graduate Assistant in Greek	1958 to 1959
Faculty in Greek and History	1960
Instructor in Greek	1961 to 1964
Asst. Professor of Greek	1965
TEDS Asst. Professor of Greek	1966
Asst. Prof. of Greek and New Testament and Self-Study	1967
Assoc. Prof. of Greek	1968
Dir. of the College Self-Study	1968
Asst. Director of Admissions & Records	1969
Dir. of Institutional Research	1969
Assoc. Prof. of Greek	1969
Source: Rolfing Library of Trinity International University

Ericson provided the analysis of the Theology of the New Testament books of 1st Peter, 2nd Peter, and Jude for the Evangelical Dictionary of Biblical Theology and other topical articles in that publication. He was the general reviewer and senior translator of the Letters and Revelation books of the New Testament in the New Living Translation of the Bible. He was also one of the translators of Hebrews, James, 1st and 2nd Peter, and Jude in that translation for the Evangelical Dictionary of Biblical Theology. As of March 2013, the New Living Translation of the Bible is the third most popular English version of the Bible based on unit sales according to the Christian Booksellers Association.

== Recognition ==
Dr. Ericson was named as a Professor Emeritus at Wheaton College in Wheaton, Illinois. A yearbook was also dedicated to him at Trinity International University. The yearbook dedication was, "This book is dedicated to a man who has abandoned what we humans would consider his rightful claim to superiority; who takes his fellow immortals seriously and whose play is of the merriest kind."

== Death ==
Ericson died on December 22, 2011, at Johnson Health Care Center in Carol Stream, Illinois.

== Works ==
=== Thesis ===
- Ericson, Norman R. (1957). An exegetical investigation into the relationship of Israel and the church (B.Div.). Trinity Theological Seminary. OCLC 20945046.
- ——— (June 1972). The Weekday Lessons from Isaiah in the Greek Prophetologion (Ph.D.). Chicago, IL: University of Chicago, Department of New Testament and Early Christian Literature.

=== Books ===
Ericson also wrote numerous books, mostly scholarly books, relating to his field in theology, and Bible studies.

- ———; Perry, Lloyd Merle (1981). John: A New Look at the 4th Gospel. Tyndale House Publishers. ISBN 9780842318921. OCLC 11573537.
- ———; Moo, Douglas J. (2009). James: Live What You Believe. Tyndale House Publishers. ISBN 9781414321974.

=== Articles ===
He also authored several articles for numerous theology journals, one was from the Journal of the Evangelical Theological Society. Ericson continues to be cited in books on Biblical studies, hermeneutics and leadership.
