= Wilbur M. Smith =

American theologian

- Occupation: Professor

Academic background
- Education: Moody Bible Institute College of Wooster

Wilbur Moorehead Smith (1894–1976) was an American theologian and one of the founding members of Fuller Theological Seminary.

== Early life ==
Smith was born in Chicago on June 8, 1894. His father, Thomas Smith, was a successful fruit trader. His mother, Sadie Sanborn Smith, read a lot and had a large library: her father was a follower of the evangelist R. A. Torrey. She taught her son to read when he was five. He developed a love of books that remained with him, and he owned more than 25,000 books.

After High School, Smith went to the Moody Bible Institute, where he studied from 1913 to 1914. There he became familiar with Torrey, Billy Sunday, H.A. Ironside, Mel Trotter, Gipsy Smith and others. His father was Trustee of the Moody Bible Institute from 1907 to 1950. From 1914 to 1917, Wilbur studied at the College of Wooster, a liberal arts school then affiliated with the Presbyterian Church.

At the end of his first year at Wooster College, Smith married Mary Irene Ostrowsky, a student at the Moody Bible Institute.

== Career ==
Smith was ordained to the Presbyterian ministry in 1922 and worked as minister in Ocean City, Maryland, Baltimore (1922–1927), Covington, Virginia (1927–30) and at First Presbyterian Church in Coatesville, Pennsylvania (1930–37).

In 1932 the Evangelical Theological College honored Smith with a Doctor of Divinity degree. The school was renamed as Dallas Theological Seminary in 1936.

Charles Fuller asked Wilbur to assist in the establishment of Fuller Theological Seminary. Wilbur with other Evangelical Bible scholars such as Harold Ockenga joined the effort. From 1947 to 1963 he delivered lectures on theology and Biblical Studies. He also guided future pastors and performed administrative tasks (1947–1963). Between 1963 and 1971 he taught an 'English Bible' course at Trinity Evangelical Divinity School.

In June 1963, Smith, an avowed fundamentalist, resigned his position at Fuller Seminary as a result of a dispute over the doctrine of the inerrancy of the Bible. He then became a professor at Trinity Evangelical Divinity School, Deerfield, where he taught from 1963 to 1967. From 1967 until his retirement in 1971.

== Author ==
Wilbur M. Smith was the editor of the annual Sunday School Peloubet's Select Notes on the International Bible Lessons for Christian Teaching, a collection of the thoughts and doctrines of Bible scholars, for more than 40 years. Smith was theologically astute and was known as a bibliophile. He had one of the world's largest personal Christian libraries.

Smith wrote regular articles in the Bibliotheca Sacra, Moody Monthly and Sunday School Times. He wrote more than 60 books on various theological topics.

His books include The Supernaturalness of Christ (1940), A Voice for God: The Life of Charles E. Fuller (1949, Reprint 2014), A Watchman on the Wall: The Life Story of Will H. Houghton (1951), Egypt in Biblical Prophecy (1957), and The Biblical Doctrine of Heaven (1968). His most important work is Therefore Stand (1945, Reprints 1972, 1981), a 614-page book on Christian apologetics . The book included a chapter on "The Resurrection of Christ from the Dead," in which Smith defended the bodily resurrection of Christ.

Smith's autobiography, Before I Forget was published in 1971 by Moody Press. In that volume Smith recounts his 1957 query of five hundred forty-four scientists listed in Who's Who in America regarding their attitude toward the resurrection of Jesus (pp. 220–223; see also Smith's article on this subject in the April 15, 1957 issue of Christianity Today). He received responses of varying length from two hundred twenty-eight. Those responses ranged from “the resurrection of Christ is…nonsense” to the avowal of a recipient of the Nobel Prize in Physics that “...I am a devout Catholic and I believe in the resurrection of Christ."

== Recognition ==
In 1971 he received an honorary doctorate (Litt.D.) from Trinity Evangelical Divinity School, at which he was a professor in Biblical Studies.
