= Soong-Chan Rah =

Korean-American Christian theologian

Soong-Chan Rah (fl. 2010 - present) is Robert Boyd Munger Professor of Evangelism at Fuller Theological Seminary.

== Biography ==
Rah obtained his B.A. in political science and history/sociology from Columbia University. He finished his M.Div. from Gordon Conwell Theological Seminary (GCTS) and his Th.M. from Harvard University. He also completed a D.Min. at GCTS and a Th.D. at Duke Divinity School.

He was the founding senior pastor of Cambridge Community Fellowship Church, a multi-ethnic, urban church in Cambridge, Massachusetts. He has previously worked with InterVarsity Christian Fellowship in the Boston area.

He was previously Milton B. Engebretson Professor of Church Growth and Evangelism at North Park University and started his role as Robert Munger Professor of Evangelism at Fuller Theological Seminary in summer 2021.

He serves on the boards of Sojourners, the Christian Community Development Association, World Vision, and the Catalyst Leadership Center. His book, Prophetic Lament: A Call for Justice in Troubled Times, received affirmation as The Englewood Review of Books Best Books of 2015 and Relevant's Top 10 Books of 2015.

== Personal life ==
He is married to Sue, a special educator. They have two children, Annah and Elijah.

== Selected works ==
- Unsettling Truths: The Ongoing, Dehumanizing Legacy of the Doctrine of Discovery. Downers Grove, IVP. 2019. ISBN 9780830845255
- Prophetic Lament: A Call for Justice in Troubled Times. Downers Grove, IVP. 2015. ISBN 9780830836949
- Many Colours: Cultural Intelligence for a Changing Church. Chicago: Moody Publishers, 2010. ISBN 9780802450487
- The Next Evangelicalism: Freeing the Church from Western Cultural Captivity. Downers Grove, IVP. 2009. ISBN 9780830833603
