= Rudy Atwood =

American pianist and Christian recording artist (1912–1992)

- Born: December 16, 1912; Marion, Illinois, U.S.
- Died: October 16, 1992 (aged 79); Los Angeles, California, U.S.
- Occupation: Pianist
- Years active: 1929–1992

Rudolph Atwood (December 16, 1912 – October 16, 1992) was an American Christian music pianist, known primarily for his years as accompanist on the long-running Old Fashioned Revival Hour radio program led by Charles E. Fuller from 1937 to 1968 on the Mutual Broadcasting System and later on the ABC Radio Network. After Fuller's death in 1968, Atwood continued to play on the successor program, The Joyful Sound. He made many recordings accompanying the program's quartet and choir and made appearances playing the piano at various churches and concerts until his death in 1992. He was known as "the most imitated pianist in gospel music", for his improvisations and arrangements of traditional hymns.

== Early years ==
Atwood was born in 1912 in Marion, Illinois, to a Baptist family. When he was 10 years old, he began taking piano lessons, which he enjoyed greatly. Atwood wrote in his autobiography, The Rudy Atwood Story, that he needed no encouragement from his parents to practice for hours, scarcely stopping for dinner. Also that year, he responded to a revival meeting altar call at the Baptist church that the Atwoods attended, becoming a born-again Christian, shortly before the family moved to California. At age 14, Atwood started playing the piano at a church in Pasadena and became interested in studying the music of his favorite composer, J. S. Bach. In later years he attributed his hymn-playing technique to the influence of Bach and the study of classical music.

As a 17-year-old in 1929, he began playing the piano regularly for Paul Rader when the Chicago evangelist started a Tabernacle in Los Angeles. It was the first time young Atwood had the thrill of playing a concert grand piano. It was also the first experience he had playing on a live radio broadcast, accompanying the singers. In 1933, he began playing the piano for the radio broadcasts on KFAC of the then-new Country Church of Hollywood, which had as its theme song "The Church in the Wildwood". It was then, said Atwood, that he realized gospel radio music was his life's calling. Atwood was often called upon to preach at the Country Church and he was eventually ordained by the church's board. It was also there that he met his future wife, Grace. Atwood continued playing piano at the Country Church of Hollywood until 1938. Among the vocal soloists he accompanied was Wilbur Nelson.

Through these experiences and practice, Atwood developed his skill in improvisation, writing:

As I look back now, I really can't tell when I found the ability to improvise. I suppose it was in those [high school] days that I began to experiment, playing the bass in octaves and filling in the chords of the right hand. It was in those first efforts when I came up with the right harmonies, and the runs began to fall into place.

== Music career ==
Atwood joined evangelist Charles E. Fuller's popular Old Fashioned Revival Hour nationwide radio broadcast in 1937, accompanying the choir and paid quartet on the piano. By the end of that year, the weekly program with Atwood at the piano was heard by a nationwide audience of 10 million listeners on 88 stations. In its heyday in the 1940s and early 1950s, the program was carried on hundreds of stations across the United States on the Mutual Broadcasting System and, later, the ABC Radio Network, and the audience had grown to an estimated 20 million listeners. Atwood played the piano for the entire 32-year run of the Old Fashioned Revival Hour, until Fuller's death in 1968. Atwood wrote of the broadcast's theme song, "Heavenly Sunshine", "A thrill reaches to my toes each time I play [it]", and the familiar piece was his most-requested number during concerts. He continued to play on the successor program, The Joyful Sound, when David Hubbard succeeded Fuller.

Atwood's signature style of continuous left-hand triplet-note octave doublings and right-hand arpeggios captivated audiences and was widely copied by many other evangelical pianists of the period. His prominence was enhanced by the popularity of radio as a mass medium for evangelism in the 1930s through 1950s by such radio evangelists as Fuller, M. R. DeHaan, Theodore Epp, G. E. Lowman, Percy Crawford, and, later, Billy Graham. Atwood was known as "the most imitated pianist in gospel music" for his improvisations and arrangements of traditional hymns. In his treatise on the increasing importance of the piano in twentieth-century American Protestant evangelism, The Origins of Evangelical Pianism, author Theodore L. Gentry called Atwood "probably the most important pianist of the radio revival period".

Throughout his career, Atwood made concert appearances, playing the piano at various churches and concert halls until shortly before his death at age 79 in 1992. Among his audience favorites were "Come Thou Fount of Every Blessing", "In the Garden", "When They Ring the Golden Bells", "Now I Belong to Jesus", and "When I Survey the Wondrous Cross". His performances included New York City's Madison Square Garden with Jack Wyrtzen, Constitution Hall in Washington, D.C., Red Rocks Amphitheatre in Colorado with Ralph Carmichael conducting an orchestra, Maple Leaf Gardens in Toronto with Fuller speaking, and the Hollywood Bowl.

Atwood became staff pianist in 1968 at the Church of the Open Door in Los Angeles, where his family attended, also playing at the large Youth for Christ rallies held at the church on Saturday nights. He was pianist at Perry Hall Baptist Church in a suburb of Baltimore, Maryland, from 1971 to 1973. Atwood wrote in his autobiography that wherever he played in a church, he felt that music should be an integral part of worship.

== Personal life and legacy ==
Atwood married Marguerite Grace Murray in 1938. They made their home in Pasadena, California, having two children. For relaxation, they enjoyed attending concerts at the Hollywood Bowl and going to Dodgers baseball games. Atwood, an avid sports fan, wrote in his autobiography, The Rudy Atwood Story, of their excitement when they witnessed Willie Stargell hit the first out-of-the-park home run at Dodger Stadium, a 507-foot (155 m) blast off the Dodgers' Alan Foster on August 5, 1969, that completely cleared the right-field pavilion and struck a bus parked outside the stadium.

Atwood's music is still heard on rebroadcasts of the Old Fashioned Revival Hour, aired on the Fundamental Broadcasting Network and streamed on the internet, and during music programming segments on the Bible Broadcasting Network (BBN) (although Atwood is no longer mentioned by name on BBN, since the network instituted a policy of not making artist attributions). Several of his recordings have been re-mastered on compact disc, such as Our Great Savior with Rudy Atwood. As to his preference for traditional hymns over contemporary Christian music, Atwood wrote: "I must play what I feel is my ministry to play. God blesses hearts, wherever He finds them, with whatever means He has at hand".

== Discography ==
Atwood made more than 60 recordings, both as piano soloist and as accompanist to various Old Fashioned Revival Hour ensembles. Many of his recordings were made in collaboration with Christian Faith Recordings, and others with Paul Mickelson and Ralph Carmichael. His recordings include:

- My Savior First Of All
- Wonderful Old Chestnuts
- The Incomparable Rudy Atwood
- Keyboard Rhapsodies: Gospel Organ & Piano Duets With Registrations For All Organs
- Just A Little Talk With Jesus
- Blessed Be The Name
- Gospel Grandeur
- Rudy Atwood Piano Favorites
- Jesus Is A Friend Of Mine

== Published works ==
Atwood published his autobiography, The Rudy Atwood Story, in 1970. Many of his hymn arrangements for piano have been published in collections, among them:

- Gospel Piano Techniques
- Jesus Shall Reign: 10 Classic Solo Piano Arrangements
- Rudy Atwood Piano Arrangements, vols. 1 and 2
- The Golden Collection of 50 All-time Great Hymns and Gospel Songs
