= Joon Gon Kim =

South Korean religious leader (1925–2009)

- Hangul: 김준곤
- Hanja: 金俊坤
- RR: Gim Jungon
- MR: Kim Chun'gon

Joon Gon Kim (Korean: 김준곤; March 28, 1925 – September 29, 2009) was a South Korean religious leader who was the founder of Korea Campus Crusade for Christ. During the Korean War, he lost both his father and his wife. In 1957, he went to the United States and attended Fuller Theological Seminary where he met Dr. Bill Bright, the founder of Campus Crusade for Christ International. In 1958, with collaboration and support from Bright, Kim established Korea Campus Crusade for Christ. In 2004, with much fanfare, Kim retired and appointed Sung Min Park as his successor.

Kim was also a famous Korean Christian evangelist. During springtime, as Kim's family was enjoying the day, an angry band of communist guerrillas invaded the village where Kim lived, killing everyone, including Kim's family. The guerrillas killed Kim's wife and father. Kim was beaten and left for dead. Late, he awoke and fled to the safety of the mountains with his young daughter, Unhi Kim.

Kim learned from the Scriptures to love his enemies and pray for those who persecuted him. The Spirit of God impressed upon him that he was to return to the village, seek out the communist leader who had led the attack and tell the communist leader, who killed Kim's wife and father, that he loved and forgave the communist leader, and to speak to the communist leader of God's love through Christ. This eventually happened, and the communist leader ended up kneeling in prayer with Kim and gave his life to Christ. Within a short time, a number of other communists were converted to Christ and Kim helped build a church for these and other new Christians. Kim later became the pastor of one of the largest churches in South Korea, and founder of Korea Campus Crusade for Christ.

== Biography ==
- 1925 – Born in Sinan, Jeollanam-do, South Korea
- 1948 – Graduated from Presbyterian Theological Seminary of Korea
- 1951 – Ordained as a pastor in the Presbyterian Church of Korea
- 1958 – Founded Korea Campus Crusade for Christ (CCC), serving as President and Chairman of the Board
- 1966 – Established the National Breakfast Prayer Meeting (delivered sermons at four presidential prayer meetings)
- 1972 – Initiated the first "Holy City Movement" in Chuncheon, South Korea
- 1974 – Chairman and keynote speaker of the Explo '74 Evangelism Conference
- 1980 – Founded the Korea Association for Creation Research
- 1981 – Appointed as the East Asia Director of the International Campus Crusade for Christ
- 1985 – Chairman and keynote speaker of the Explo '85 global satellite evangelism conference
- 1990 – Appointed as the International Senior Director of Campus Crusade for Christ
- 1995 – Chairman and keynote speaker of the Global Consultation On World Evangelization (GCOWE ’95)
- 2002 – Awarded the Moran Medal of the Order of Civil Merit
- 2005 – Appointed as the Global President of the Holy City Movement
- 2009 – Passed away on September 29 due to illness at Severance Hospital, Seoul

== Influence ==
By the time Kim Joon-gon stepped down from his position as the national director of the Korean Campus Crusade for Christ (CCC) in February 2003, approximately 300,000 university students had been involved with the organization. Notable figures who emerged from the CCC include Reverend Hong Jung-gil, former director of the South Seoul Eunhye Church, and Reverend Ha Yong-jo, former staff member of the Onnuri Church. Other prominent individuals associated with the CCC include former Prime Minister Chung Un-chan, Seoul Women's University President Lee Gwang-ja, Chilsung Textile Chairman Joo Su-il, and retired Army General Park Se-hwan.

== See also ==
- Christianity in Korea
