= David Emmanuel Goatley =

American theologian (born 1961)

David Emmanuel Goatley (born 1961) is an American theologian who has served as the President of Fuller Theological Seminary since 2023.

== Early life and education ==
Goatley studied at the University of Louisville where he earned a bachelor’s degree in guidance and counseling. He went on to earn a master of divinity degree in pastoral care and a Ph.D. in theology from Southern Baptist Theological Seminary.

== Career and ministry ==
After being ordained as a minister in the National Baptist Convention, USA he served as pastor of the First Baptist Church of Campbellsville, Kentucky. Later he became the CEO of the Lott Carey Baptist Foreign Mission Society. He was then appointed Ruth W. and A. Morris Williams Jr. Research Professor of Theology and Christian Ministry at Duke Divinity School, where he also served as associate dean for academic and vocational formation and director of the Office of Black Church Studies. He is Fuller's first Black president.

Under Goatley's leadership, Fuller considered revising its sexual standards to become more accepting of LGBTQ+ students, before eventually affirming the "historic theological understanding of marriage".
