= Edward John Carnell =

American theologian, pastor, and academic (1919–1967)

2nd President of Fuller Theological Seminary
- In office 1954–1959
- Preceded by: Harold John Ockenga
- Succeeded by: David Allan Hubbard

Personal details
- Born: June 28, 1919 Antigo, Wisconsin, U.S.
- Died: April 25, 1967 (aged 47) Alameda County, California, U.S.
- Education: Wheaton College (BA); Westminster Theological Seminary (ThM); Harvard University (PhD); Boston University (PhD)

Edward John Carnell (28 June 1919 – 25 April 1967) was a prominent Christian theologian and apologist, was an ordained Baptist pastor, and served as President of Fuller Theological Seminary in Pasadena, California. He was the author of nine major books, several of which attempted to develop a fresh outlook in Christian apologetics. He also wrote essays that were published in several other books, and was a contributor of articles to periodicals such as The Christian Century and Christianity Today.

== Family ==
Carnell was born in Antigo, Wisconsin, on June 28, 1919, and was the third of four children born to Herbert Carnell and Fannie Carstens. In January 1944, he married Shirley Rowe, a school teacher from Wisconsin.

== Education ==
Carnell began his tertiary education at Wheaton College, Illinois, where he majored in philosophy and received his B.A. degree. His philosophical mentor at Wheaton was the Calvinist apologist Gordon Clark. Carnell then commenced theological studies at Westminster Theological Seminary where he was awarded the Th.B and Th.M degrees. John Murray and Cornelius Van Til were two of his lecturers who influenced him greatly. He then proceeded to doctoral studies in history and the philosophy of religion at Harvard Divinity School. During his candidacy at Harvard, Carnell also enrolled as a doctoral candidate in philosophy at Boston University under the tutelage of Edgar S. Brightman. Carnell's theological dissertation at Harvard was on Reinhold Niebuhr, while his philosophical dissertation at Boston was on Søren Kierkegaard.

== Apologetic writings ==
During the period of his doctoral studies, Carnell composed a work in Christian apologetics that he submitted to William Eerdmans in a competition for the Evangelical Book Award. Carnell's manuscript won the five thousand dollar prize, which in 1948 was a considerable sum of money. It was hailed in Evangelical circles as a masterly new work in apologetics, and established a reputation for Carnell as a brilliant young and rising theologian.

The book, which was released as An Introduction to Christian Apologetics, reflected the apologetic influences of his mentors Gordon Clark and Cornelius Van Til, and also the philosophical influence of Edgar Sheffield Brightman. In the book he sought to show that Christian faith was systematically logical, factual and rationally satisfying as it best fitted the facts as an explanation for the human condition. His apologetic gambits dealt with topics such as Biblical criticism, the problem of miracles, evolution, and the existential problem of soul-sorrow in an effort to show that Christianity offers a coherent view of reality.

In many respects his apologetic approach represented an attempt at combining the deductive rationalist and presuppositionalist methods of Clark and Van Til, with a test for truth he called "systematic consistency". Later analysts of Evangelical apologetics have dubbed his apologetic method as either a "combinationalist" or "verificational" approach. Irving Hexham has noted in his survey of apologetic responses to New Age spirituality that Carnell's approach had some influence on the way in which Francis Schaeffer developed his apologetic writings. Hexham states, "Another source for Schaeffer's ideas was the evangelical philosopher E. J. Carnell, although Schaeffer was reluctant to admit this unless directly asked."

Carnell's second apologetic text, A Philosophy of the Christian Religion, explored questions of value that are personally and existentially satisfying. This study is technically known as axiology.

Two further apologetic works Christian Commitment and The Kingdom of Love and the Pride of Life delved into subjective issues of introspective meaning. Both texts reflected his deep study and appreciation of the work of Søren Kierkegaard. Carnell emphasised the meaning of authentic discipleship and commitment to the way of Christ as grounded in God's love.

After graduating from Harvard, Carnell joined the faculty of the recently founded Fuller Seminary. Carnell was attracted to this seminary as it was part of an emerging movement of reform within Protestant Fundamentalism. The background to this new movement of reform lies in the nineteenth century and the early twentieth century.

=== Fundamentalist-Liberal controversies ===
In the nineteenth century Evangelicalism had been the major expression of Protestant theology and church life in North America. Towards the end of that century a major division occurred in Protestant thought in Europe, England, and America that transcended denominational affiliations. The division comprised two broad camps: Liberal Christianity and Evangelical Christianity. The tensions between these two camps arose over developments in Enlightenment based philosophy where theistic or supernatural explanations of reality were brought into question.

The questioning of theism was not confined to abstract concerns in philosophy, but also developed as modern historical consciousness dawned. This new historical consciousness was presaged in the seventeenth century controversies of Deism where Biblical miracles, and especially Christ's resurrection, were called into doubt. Alongside the debates about miracles came new conjectures about the authorship of the Biblical books, and investigations into possible sub-documents and written sources undergirding the present biblical texts.

A further element of controversy for Christians at that time arose in the wake of the theory of evolution as propounded in 1859 by Charles Darwin. The Genesis narratives of the creation and Noah's Flood were brought into doubt, and the science versus religion debates accelerated.

Those in the Liberal camp sought to reconcile their faith and theology in light of the modern historical consciousness and evolutionary thought. Some within the Liberal camp began to redefine the message of Christ in light of socialist criticism, and the Social Gospel developed in the popular writings of Charles Sheldon (the inventor of the "What Would Jesus Do" slogan) and in the theological writings of Walter Rauschenbusch.

Those in the Evangelical camp began to argue that the Liberals were engaged in a massive compromise, if not betrayal, of the central tenets of Christianity. Many of the nineteenth century Evangelicals had prized higher learning, cultural engagement, and pursued matters of social justice and reform (like anti-vivisection, anti-slavery, prison reform). However, as the gospel message of the Liberals was perceived to be largely about social reform and not about personal repentance from sin, the suspicions between the two camps widened.

In 1915 a multi-volume work called The Fundamentals was published, which comprised a variety of tracts that reasserted traditional Christian teachings and challenged modern skeptical thinking and Liberal Christian ideas. It is from these volumes that the subsequent label of fundamentalist was coined in the 1920s and in the wake of the famous Scopes trial on the teaching of evolution.

=== Neo-Evangelicals ===
In the early 1940s a number of those who had grown up in a fundamentalist ethos began to question the eccentricities of the subculture, and particularly its disengagement from both the academy and mainstream culture. A new organization known as the National Association of Evangelicals was formed with the agenda of reforming society. Some of the emerging leaders of this movement, which came to be dubbed "Neo-Evangelical" included Carl F. H. Henry, Harold Ockenga and Billy Graham. These men were convinced that a two-pronged approach to societal transformation was possible. One approach was to reengage the academy bringing a distinctly Christian worldview to bear on disciplines such as history, philosophy, science, literature, art and law. The other approach involved itinerant evangelistic preachers proclaiming the message at the grass roots level of society.

As the Neo-Evangelical leaders pushed towards these goals, a division occurred between them and their more conservative and sometimes militant colleagues who continued to pursue the cause of fundamentalism.

== Neo-Evangelical leader ==
Carnell had grown up as a fundamentalist and been trained at Wheaton College, which was one of the bastions of fundamentalism. He was, however, dissatisfied with the anti-intellectual tendencies he discerned in fundamentalist culture. He was therefore very receptive to the message of Neo-Evangelicals who sought to reform both fundamentalism and the wider society.

As part of his contribution to challenging the culture of fundamentalism, Carnell confronted the issue initially by dealing with the advent of television. Some fundamentalists feared that television was a device in the hands of the devil. In his book Television: Servant or Master? Carnell dealt with some of the issues concerning modern communication systems, the use of technology in the promotion of the Christian message, and engaging with wider cultural concerns. Carnell scorned the anti-intellectual tendencies in fundamentalism, and attacked its legalistic and negative mentality about culture.

In 1954 Carnell was appointed the President of Fuller Seminary. As some of the Neo-Evangelicals, like Carl F. H. Henry and Harold Ockenga, had been instrumental in establishing the seminary, Carnell's rising profile as an apologist, theologian, and now seminary professor, catapulted him into the spotlight.

In his book The Case for Orthodox Theology Carnell sought to separate the Neo-Evangelicals from the fundamentalists by arguing that a Reformed Orthodox theology was considerably different from fundamentalism. He attacked the legalism and hypocrisy he saw in fundamentalism and argued that it was "orthodoxy gone cultic". He highlighted what he saw as critical deficiencies in fundamentalist thought and practice. As a result of his published diatribe Carnell became the object of much criticism from fundamentalist preachers.

Carnell's personal life was not without difficulties as he suffered from depression and insomnia, and received psychiatric treatment including electro-convulsive therapy. His treatment included doses of barbiturates, and he died in 1967 from a drug overdose. The cause of his death has been the subject of much conjecture as the coronial finding was unable to determine whether the dose was accidental or not.

Carnell's legacy, however, is generally regarded as a positive contribution to the re-emergence of Evangelicals in scholarly pursuits. His apologetic contributions influenced the post-World War Two generation of evangelicals, and emphasized the importance of the gospel and culture. He was greatly admired by his students at Fuller Seminary.

== Death ==
Carnell died on April 14, 1967, at the Claremont Hotel in Oakland, California. The Alameda County Coroner determined that he had a significant amount of barbiturates in his system, but there was no determination whether or not the death was an accident or suicide. Carnell was survived by his wife and two children.

== Publications ==
- An Introduction to Christian Apologetics, William B. Eerdmans, Grand Rapids, 1948.
- Television: Servant or Master? William B. Eerdmans, Grand Rapids, 1950.
- The Theology of Reinhold Niebuhr, William B. Eerdmans, Grand Rapids, 1950.
- A Philosophy of the Christian Religion, William B. Eerdmans, Grand Rapids, 1952. ISBN 0-8010-2464-1
- The Burden of Søren Kierkegaard, William B. Eerdmans, Grand Rapids, 1956.
- Christian Commitment: An Apologetic, MacMillan, New York, 1957. ISBN 0-8010-2473-0
- The Case for Orthodox Theology, Westminster Press, Philadelphia, 1959.
- The Kingdom of Love and the Pride of Life, William B. Eerdmans, Grand Rapids, 1960.
- The Case for Biblical Christianity, William B. Eerdmans, Grand Rapids, 1969.

== Bibliography ==
- Boa, Kenneth D., and Robert M. Bowman, Faith has Its Reasons: An Integrative Approach to Defending Christianity, NAV Press, Colorado Springs, 2001. ISBN 1-57683-143-4
- Harper, Kenneth C., "Edward John Carnell: An Evaluation of his Apologetics," Journal of the Evangelical Theological Society, 20/2 (June 1977), 133-146.
- Lewis, Gordon R., Testing Christianity's Truth Claims, Moody Press, Chicago, 1976. ISBN 0-8024-8595-2
- Marsden, George M., Reforming Fundamentalism: Fuller Seminary and the New Evangelicalism, William B. Eerdmans, Grand Rapids, 1987. ISBN 0-8028-3642-9
- Nash, Ronald H., The New Evangelicalism, Zondervan, Grand Rapids, 1963.
- Nelson, Rudolph., The Making and Unmaking of an Evangelical Mind: The Case of Edward John Carnell, Cambridge University Press, New York, 1987. ISBN 0-521-34263-5
- Ramm, Bernard., Types of Apologetic Systems, Van Kampen Press, Wheaton, 1953.
- Sims, John A., Edward John Carnell: Defender of the Faith, University Press of America, Washington DC, 1979.
- Sims, John A., Missionaries to the Skeptics: Christian Apologists for the Twentieth Century. C. S. Lewis, E. J. Carnell and Reinhold Niebuhr, Mercer University Press, Macon, Georgia, 1995. ISBN 0-86554-496-4
- Wozniak, Kenneth., Ethics in the Thought of Edward John Carnell, University Press of America, Lanham, 1983. ISBN 0-8191-3416-3
