= Richard Mouw =

American theologian and philosopher (born 1940)

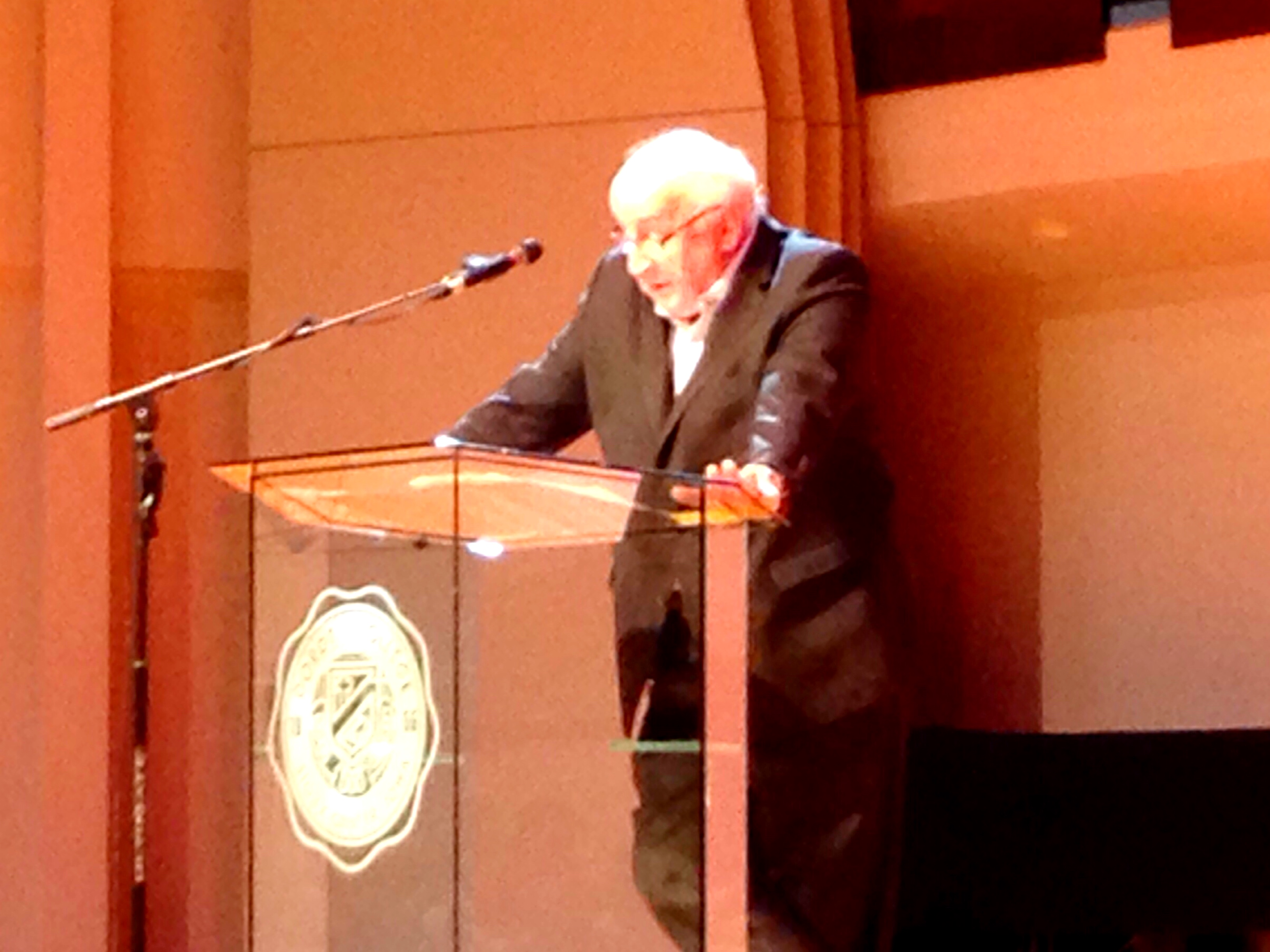
- Mouw in 2016
- Born: Richard John Mouw; April 22, 1940 (age 86)
- Title: President of Fuller Theological Seminary (1993–2013)
- Spouse: Phyllis Mouw

Academic background
- Education: Houghton College; University of Alberta; University of Chicago
- Influences: Abraham Kuyper

Academic work
- Discipline: Philosophy; theology
- School or tradition: Neo-Calvinism
- Institutions: Calvin University; Fuller Theological Seminary
- Main interests: Common grace

Richard John Mouw (born 1940) is an American theologian and philosopher. He held the position of President at Fuller Theological Seminary for 20 years (1993–2013), and continues to hold the post of Professor of Faith and Public Life.

== Education and career ==
Mouw was born on April 22, 1940. He received the BA from Houghton College. He then studied at Western Theological Seminary. He was awarded the MA from the University of Alberta, and his PhD from the University of Chicago.

Mouw was Professor of Christian philosophy at Calvin University for seventeen years. He has also served as a visiting professor to the Free University of Amsterdam. He was appointed Professor of Christian Philosophy and Ethics at Fuller Theological Seminary in 1985. In 1993 he was elected president of Fuller Theological Seminary, retiring after the 2012–2013 academic year after 20 years of service. In 2020, Mouw retired from Fuller and returned to Calvin University, becoming a senior research fellow at the Paul B. Henry Institute for the Study of Christianity and Politics.

In 2007, Mouw, who sees Abraham Kuyper as a personal hero, was awarded the Abraham Kuyper Prize for Excellence in Reformed Theology and Public Life at Princeton Theological Seminary by the Abraham Kuyper Center for Public Theology.

== Views ==
=== Dialogue with Catholics ===
In 2009, he signed a public statement encouraging all Christians to "read, wrestle with, and respond to Caritas in Veritate", the social encyclical by Pope Benedict XVI. He participated in an interfaith dialogue with Donald Senior, President of Catholic Theological Union and Professor of New Testament Studies, at the Arts Club of Chicago, Chicago, Illinois, November 14, 2011, which can be viewed on Vimeo.

=== Dialogue with Mormons ===
In November 2004, Mouw offered introductory remarks at a speaking event where Christian evangelist and apologist Ravi Zacharias was the featured speaker, at the Salt Lake Tabernacle at Temple Square in Salt Lake City, Utah. In his remarks, he apologized to Mormons for the way in which many Evangelicals have treated the Mormon faith. "Let me state it clearly," Mouw said. "We evangelicals have sinned against you [Mormons]." Since his formal apology to Mormons, he has been criticized by some in the evangelical community for saying that detractors of Mormonism are guilty of "shading the truth". He has reported that he continues to "get hate mail yet on that." In an article in the May 2016 issue of First Things, he argued that Mormons were progressively de-emphasising the unorthodox aspects of their theology and moving closer to the Christian theological mainstream.

Multiple Mormon commentators have expressed appreciation for Mouw's efforts to understand their faith to a greater extent.

== Writings ==
- Political Evangelism (Grand Rapids: William B. Eerdmans, 1973).
- Politics and the Biblical Drama (Grand Rapids: William B. Eerdmans, 1976).
- Called to Holy Worldliness (Philadelphia: Fortress Press, 1980).
- Objections to Christianity (Grand Rapids: Bible Way, 1981).
- When The Kings Come Marching In: Isaiah and the New Jerusalem (Grand Rapids: William B. Eerdmans, 1983).
- Distorted Truth: What Every Christian Needs to Know About the Battle for the Mind (San Francisco: Harper and Row, 1989).
- Stained Glass: Worldviews and Social Science, ed. with Paul A. Marshall and Sander Griffioen (Lanham: University Press of America, 1989).
- The God Who Commands (Notre Dame: University of Notre Dame, 1990).
- Uncommon Decency: Christian Civility in an Uncivil World (Downers Grove: InterVarsity Press, 1992).
- Pluralisms and Horizons: An Essay in Christian Public Philosophy, with Sander Griffioen (Grand Rapids: William B. Eerdmans, 1993).
- Consulting the Faithful: What Christian Intellectuals Can Learn from Popular Religion (Grand Rapids: William B. Eerdmans, 1994).
- The Smell of Sawdust: What Evangelicals Can Learn from Their Fundamentalist Heritage (Grand Rapids: Zondervan, 2000).
- He Shines in all that's Fair: Culture and Common Grace (Grand Rapids: William B. Eerdmans, 2001).
- Wonderful Words of Life: Hymns in American Protestant History and Theology, with Mark A. Noll (Grand Rapids: William B. Eerdmans, 2004).
- Calvinism in the Las Vegas Airport: Making Connections in Today's World (Grand Rapids: Zondervan, 2004).
- Praying at Burger King (Grand Rapids: William B. Eerdmans, 2007).
- Talking with Mormons: An Invitation to Evangelicals (Grand Rapids: William B. Eerdmans, 2012).
- "Foreword" in The New Mormon Challenge, Francis J. Beckwith, Carl Mosser and Paul Owen, eds. (Grand Rapids: Zondervan, 2002), pp. 11–13.

Academic offices
Preceded by David Allan Hubbard	President of Fuller Theological Seminary; 1993–2013	Succeeded by Mark Labberton
