= Sacred Records =

- Founded: 1944
- Founder: Earle E. Williams
- Defunct: 1963
- Genre: Gospel, Christian
- Country of origin: United States

Sacred Records was a religious music record label founded in 1944 by Earle E. Williams.

== History ==
Earle E. Williams, a minister of youth and music director in the Los Angeles area, decided to start a religious music record label in 1944 as a solution to the problem of obtaining the records he needed for his work, which included broadcasting a weekly half-hour radio program every Sunday at noon on local station KXLA. In a 1947 interview, Williams described to United Press International (UPI), "I sold my car, ray dog, my wife's spinet, a camera and a renovated church organ and borrowed the rest on a note to get the $3,000 I had to have to start production.

Based in Los Angeles, Sacred Records recorded and published religious music. The label merged with Kansas City's White Church Records in 1949, and by the following year the company had opened new offices in Kansas City, Philadelphia, and New York. Composer and arranger Ralph Carmichael convinced the label to finance Rhapsody in Sacred Music (1958), an instrumental album that featured a full symphony, including four trumpets, four trombones, multiple french horns, woodwinds, a string section of at least 12 violins and four viola, two bass harps, and percussion. "It was the first all-instrumental sacred music recording with that size orchestra", Carmichael said. "It was a scary experiment and I nearly broke the record company."

Sacred Records was acquired by Word Records in 1963. Williams remained with Word as a salesman and distributor.

== See also ==
- List of record labels
