= Harold Lindsell =

Evangelical scholar

Academic background
- Education: Wheaton College University of California, Berkeley New York University

Harold Lindsell (December 22, 1913 – January 15, 1998) was an evangelical Christian author and scholar who was one of the founding members of Fuller Theological Seminary. He is best known for his 1976 book The Battle for the Bible.

Lindsell was born in New York City and obtained degrees at Wheaton College, University of California, Berkeley and New York University. He taught at Columbia Bible College (Columbia International University), Northern Baptist Theological Seminary, Fuller Theological Seminary, and Wheaton College before becoming editor of Christianity Today. He served as president of the Evangelical Theological Society in 1971.

Lindsell was concerned with the direction Fuller took after his departure, and this led him to write The Battle for the Bible in 1976. He is credited with boosting the efforts of conservatives to wrest the Southern Baptist Convention away from moderates over the issue of biblical inerrancy. Ruth Graham credited him with "being used by God to save her doubting faith" while she was a student at Wheaton.

Lindsell's contributions to the exegesis of Scripture included preparing and editing the introductions, annotations, topical headings, marginal references, and index to the Harper Study Bible, published by Zondervan Bible Publishers.

Lindsell was diagnosed with polyneuropathy in 1991 and died of flu complications in 1998.
