= Korea Campus Crusade for Christ =

- Hangul: 한국 대학생 선교회
- Hanja: 韓國大學生宣敎會
- RR: Hanguk daehaksaeng seongyohoe
- MR: Han'guk taehaksaeng sŏn'gyohoe

Korea Campus Crusade for Christ (KCCC) (also known as "Soon Movement" in the United States) is an interdenominational Korean organization founded by Dr. Joon Gon Kim in 1958. It was the first overseas mission post for Campus Crusade for Christ, founded by Dr. Bill Bright in 1951. Since its inception in 1958, Korea Campus Crusade for Christ (KCCC) has field offices both domestically and internationally spreading over countries from Asia to the Americas, including the United States. Its main focus is on world evangelism and discipleship.

Korea Campus Crusade for Christ became the first overseas mission post for Campus Crusade for Christ under the tutelage of Bright. KCCC ministry began in the southwestern city of Gwangjoo and quickly spread to other parts of Korea including Seoul, Busan, Daegu, Daejun, and Jeonju. Currently, KCCC headquarters is located at Buam-dong with 50 domestic mission posts and 15 international mission posts with over 1,000 missionaries abroad.

After half a century as the head of KCCC, founder Dr. Joon Gon Kim retired his post and Reverend Sung Min Park was chosen to succeed him.

== Name change ==
On March 11, 2016, KCCC in the United States officially announced that it would be changing its name to 'SOON Movement.' Both names would be continued to be used together as they ultimately transition to their new name.

Soon is a Korean term that appears in the Korean translation of Isaiah 53:2, which describes Jesus as one who "grew up before him like a tender shoot" (soon is 'shoot' in Korean). Additionally, KCCC's small groups are called soons, in which soon wons (small group members) are discipled by soon jangs (small group leaders). Using the word soon as part of the ministry's new name reflects the importance of discipleship in their movement.

== Los Angeles ==
Although there were efforts to expand Korea Campus Crusade for Christ, Los Angeles, in the 1980s and 1990s, it was not until 1996 when Rev. Dong Whan Kim revitalized the organization and propelled it into one of the largest interdenominational Korean mission organizations in Southern California.

One of its prime ministries is the campus ministry that covers some of the largest college campuses in southern and northern California, including the University of California, Riverside, Santa Monica College, San Jose State University, University of Southern California, University of California, Los Angeles, University of California, Irvine, University of California, Berkeley, California State University, Long Beach, California State University, Northridge, California Institute of Technology, University of California, Santa Barbara, University of California, San Diego, and others.

Other ministries include summer overseas mission trips where members are encouraged to participate in overseas missions to countries and regions including Thailand, Japan, Asia Minor, Cambodia, East Asia, Mongolia, Central Asia, Laos, South Africa and Hawaii for interstate mission. Activities during the mission may include cross-cultural events, teaching English to foreigners, showing films and performing tae-kwon-do demonstrations and if circumstances are safe enough, proselytism. Since 1997, Korea Campus Crusade for Christ, Los Angeles, has been conducting annual summer mission trips that have come to include upwards of 500 college students participating in the ministry as short-term missionaries.

KCCC has a weekly prayer gathering called Gethsemane every Thursday at Dong Shin Church in Fullerton.

== iMPACT ==
iMPACT is a dance ministry within KCCC. The team practices at KCCC headquarters. iMPACT consists of members all over California from University of California Colleges, Cal State Universities, and Community Colleges. As of 2013 the director and coordinator was Jason Cheung. iMPACT's main performance is the annual Vision Conference, E-Crusade, and Korea Conference.
