= Traverse Symphony Orchestra =

The Traverse City Philharmonic is a professional part-time symphony orchestra based in Traverse City, northern Michigan.

In 2001 Kevin Rhodes joined the orchestra as music director and the orchestra evolved into a professional organization with a core base of musicians drawn from the Michigan region. Performances are held at Interlochen's Corson Auditorium and the City Opera House in downtown Traverse City. The Traverse City Philharmonic is a nonprofit corporation supported by ticket sales, donations, corporate sponsorships and grants.

== History ==
The Traverse City Philharmonic was founded in 1952 by Elnora Milliken as an amateur community ensemble under the direction of Dr Pedro Paz. The first concert was held in December, 1952, featuring Beethoven's Symphony No.1, Strauss' "Emperor" Waltz, the Carmen Suite No.1 by Georges Bizet. There was a connection over the years with Interlochen Center for the Arts, providing a core of musicians and conductors from among faculty and students. Until 1985 it was known as the Northwest Michigan Symphony Orchestra, then changed the name to Traverse Symphony Orchestra until 2024, when the name changed again to Traverse City Philharmonic.

== Education ==
The Traverse City Philharmonic offers educational programs that provide enriching music to 4,000 children and students each year. The Civic program offers students of all ages opportunities to work with professional musicians in one of two ensembles based upon skill and experience levels.
