= David Allan Hubbard =

American scholar and seminary president (1928–1996)

3rd President of Fuller Theological Seminary
- In office 1963–1993
- Preceded by: Edward John Carnell
- Succeeded by: Richard Mouw

Personal details
- Born: April 8, 1928 Stockton, California
- Died: June 7, 1996 (aged 68) Santa Barbara, California
- Spouse: Ruth Doyal Hubbard
- Education: Westmont College (B.A.); Fuller Theological Seminary (M.Div.); St. Andrews University (Ph.D.)

David Allan Hubbard (April 8, 1928 – June 7, 1996) was the 3rd President of Fuller Theological Seminary and an Old Testament scholar. Under his leadership, Fuller became the world's largest multidenominational seminary and an important center for mainstream evangelical thought.

== Education and early career ==
Native Californian Hubbard earned a B.A. from Westmont College in Santa Barbara and B.D. and Th.M. from Fuller. He went to St. Andrews University in Scotland for his doctoral work, where he wrote a dissertation on The literary sources of the Kebra Nagast.

Hubbard taught at Westmont College from 1957 to 1963 and quickly became the chair of the department of biblical studies and philosophy.

== Presidency at Fuller ==
At the age of 35 in 1963, Hubbard became president and chancellor of Fuller Theological Seminary. He was also appointed as a professor of the Old Testament. He served in that role for 30 years, during which the seminary added a School of Psychology and a School of World Mission (now called the School of Intercultural Studies) to its original School of Theology and experienced the growth in enrollment and influence that led it to identify itself as the world's largest interdenominational seminary. He led the seminary through several controversial decisions, including opening an Office of Women's Concerns, mandating use of inclusive language, and changing the wording in the seminary's statement of faith with respect to biblical inerrancy.

David’s leadership enabled the seminary to grow from 300 students in the 1960s to over 3,500 in the 1990s.

== Other activities ==
Hubbard authored 36 books, including four commentaries on books of the Old Testament. He was a general editor of the Word Biblical Commentary series at the time of his death.

Hubbard was an ordained Baptist minister. He succeeded Charles E. Fuller as speaker on The Joyful Sound radio program, which evolved from the Old Fashioned Revival Hour broadcast following Fuller's death. He served on the California Board of Education from 1972 to 1975.
