= Charles E. Fuller (Baptist minister) =

American Baptist radio minister (1887–1968)

The Reverend Charles E. Fuller
- Born: April 25, 1887; Los Angeles, California, U.S.
- Died: March 18, 1968 (aged 80); Pasadena, California, U.S.
- Spouse: Grace Leone Payton
- Children: 1
- Church: Baptist
- Congregations served: Old Fashioned Revival Hour, weekly radio program (1937–1968)

Charles Edward Fuller (April 25, 1887 – March 18, 1968) was an American Baptist minister and a radio evangelist.

== Early life ==
He was born in Los Angeles to a prosperous southern California orange grove owner in 1887. Although raised by devout Methodists, he displayed little interest in religious matters as a youth. Fuller graduated from Pomona College in 1910 as a chemist and worked in his father's citrus-packing business in southern California until 1918. Fuller married his high school sweetheart, Grace Payton, in 1910. Fuller was converted under the preaching of Paul Rader, pastor of Chicago's Moody Church in 1916.

== Career ==
After his conversion in 1916, Fuller began to teach the adult Sunday school class at Placentia Presbyterian Church in Placentia (Orange County, in the Los Angeles metropolitan area. He later entered the Bible Institute of Los Angeles (now Biola University), eventually becoming chairman of the board. Kraphol & Lippy (1999) states, "Under the tutelage of Biola's dean, Reuben A. Torrey, Fuller developed a religious perspective that was strongly weighted toward fundamentalism and dispensationalism. Fuller then dabbled in volunteer religious work in the Los Angeles area for several years until his fundamentalist views forced him and many of his Sunday school class to split from Placentia Presbyterian in 1925." Initially a Presbyterian, he became a Baptist minister in 1925. After his ordination as a Baptist minister, he pastored a group that named itself the Calvary Church.

Fuller held revival meetings down the West Coast of the United States, and soon began using radio as a method to get his message out. By 1930, he was regularly broadcasting Calvary's Sunday school services as well as Bible study programs in the local area. Eventually, the time he spent on the radio broadcast conflicted with the time he spent pastoring his church, so he either resigned his pastorship or was fired in 1933 and formed the nonprofit Gospel Broadcasting Association to support his radio efforts.

He gained renown as the host and speaker of The Old Fashioned Revival Hour, a weekly Sunday radio broadcast that aired from 1937 to 1968. The first nationwide broadcast occurred on October 3, 1937, on the Mutual Broadcasting System. Beginning in 1951, the program was carried on the ABC Radio Network, heard on more than 650 radio stations.

The Old Fashioned Revival Hour broadcast was originally recorded in a Hollywood studio. In 1941, it was moved to the Long Beach Municipal Auditorium in Long Beach, California. From 1941 through 1958, audiences attended services that were broadcast live on the radio from the Auditorium. After January 12, 1958, the program was again produced in a studio. The broadcasts were noted for their music, featuring the Old Fashioned Revival Hour Choir and quartet, accompanied by organist George Broadbent and pianist Rudy Atwood. The choir made several popular recordings in the 1940s and 1950s. Aided by his wife, Grace, the Old Fashioned Revival Hour program created a family-like atmosphere, and by 1942 it had attracted an audience of over 10 million listeners worldwide.

Fuller founded Fuller Theological Seminary in Pasadena, California, in 1947. His son, Daniel Fuller, served the seminary as Dean and professor of hermeneutics. In 2005 Daniel Fuller was honored at an awards convocation for 50 years of service to the seminary.

== Death and legacy ==
Charles Fuller died in 1968, shortly after his final broadcast of the Old Fashioned Revival Hour. He is buried at Forest Lawn Memorial Park in Glendale, California. The Long Beach Municipal Auditorium was demolished in the 1960s, but a plaque marks the site of Fuller's broadcasts. Co-authors Kraphol and Lippy write the following about his legacy: "When Fuller died in 1968, his important role as a major figure in the development of post-World War II neoevangelicalism was not fully appreciated. Yet, his organizational skill, his masterful use of the radio medium, his vision for Christian higher education, and his willingness to moderate the more divisive aspects of his own fundamentalism background made him a significant force in the development of modern American evangelical ethos."

The book Pagan Christianity by George Barna and Frank Viola notes Fuller's popularization of the use of the terminology "personal savior" when speaking of Jesus.

As of 2015 re-broadcasts of the Old Fashioned Revival Hour stream weekly on the Internet.
