= Fuller Theological Seminary =

Evangelical theological seminary in Pasadena, California, United States

Coordinates: 34°08′55″N 118°08′24″W

- Type: Seminary
- Established: 1947; 79 years ago
- Endowment: $122.8 million (2024)
- President: David Emmanuel Goatley
- Students: 1,401 FTE (2025)
- Location: Pasadena, California, United States
- Campus: Urban
- Website: fuller.edu

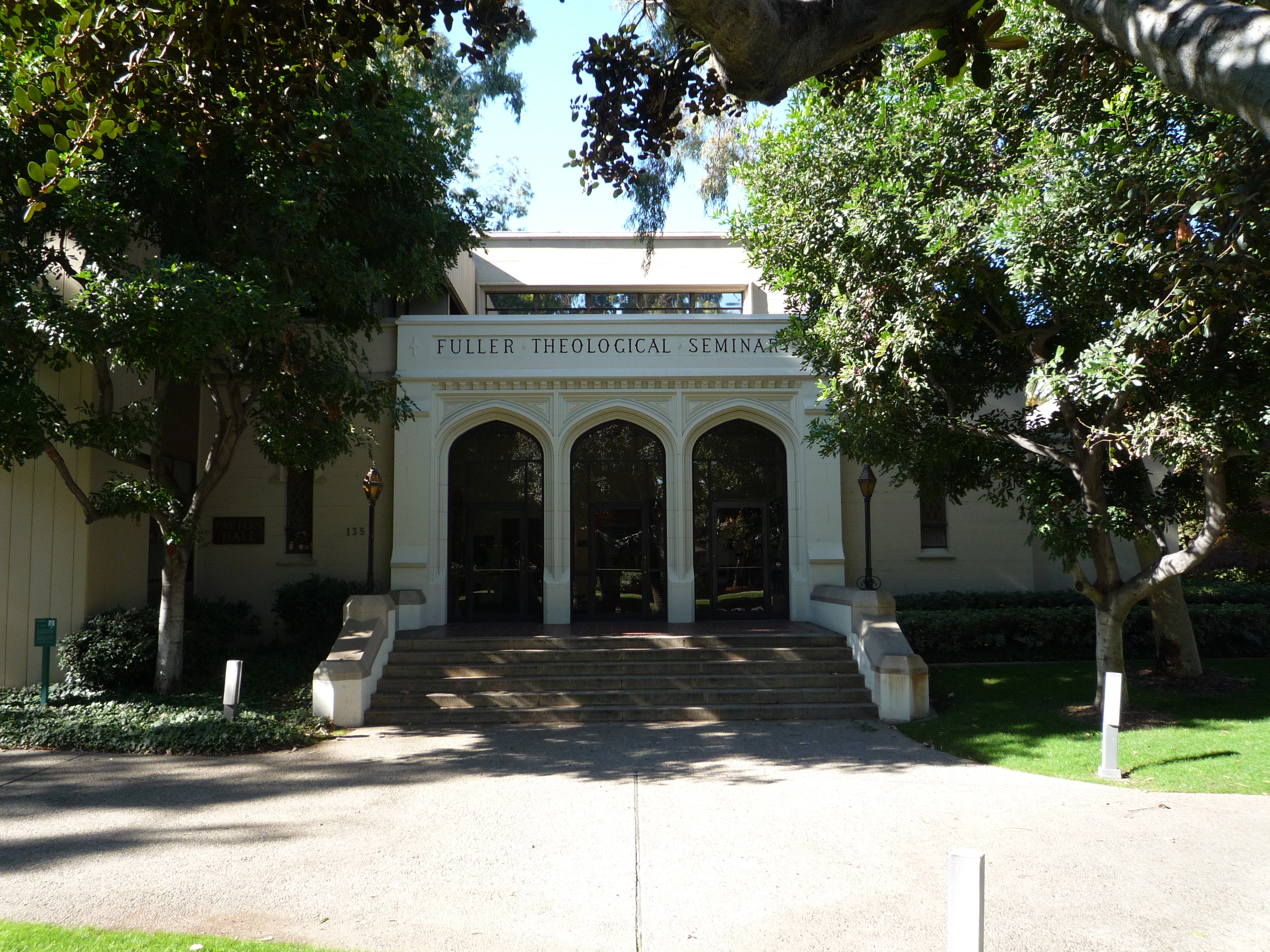
Payton Hall on the Pasadena Campus

Fuller Theological Seminary is an Evangelical seminary in Pasadena, California, with regional campuses in the Western United States. It is egalitarian in nature (accepts both female and male students).

Fuller has a student body of approximately 664 FTE students from many countries and denominations. There are over 41,000 alumni. Fuller is broadly evangelical among faculty and student body. Some hold conservative evangelical views such as unlimited inerrancy while others hold liberal evangelical sentiments such as limited inerrancy which views the Bible as true on matters of salvation but contains error in its recording of history and science.

== History ==
Fuller Theological Seminary was founded in 1947 by Charles E. Fuller, a radio evangelist known for his Old Fashioned Revival Hour show, and Harold Ockenga, the pastor of Park Street Church in Boston. The seminary's founders sought to reform fundamentalism's separatist and sometimes anti-intellectual stance during the 1920s–1940s. Fuller envisaged that the seminary would become "a Caltech of the evangelical world." In the late 1940s, evangelical theologians from Fuller championed the Christian importance of social activism.

The earliest faculty held theologically and socially conservative views, though professors with liberal perspectives arrived in the 1960s and 1970s. There were tensions in the late 1950s and early 1960s as some faculty members became uncomfortable with staff and students who did not agree with Biblical inerrancy. This led to people associated with the seminary playing a role in the rise of neo-evangelicalism and progressive theology.

David Hubbard recruited Donald McGavran to be the first dean of the newly created school of world mission in 1965. McGavran was esteemed as perhaps the world's most prominent and influential missiologist of the 20th century. McGavran recruited some of the greatest missiologist of the 20th century to serve as faculty of the school of world mission at Fuller Theological Seminary. This included Alan Tippett, Ralph Winter, C. Peter Wagner and many others. These faculty would shape world missions for the ensuing decades. Fuller's School of World Mission became the largest missions training institution in the world. The school of world mission also has the largest amount of missions faculty of any institution in the world as well as graduating the most missions students of any seminary.

In 2022, it had 2,370 students enrolled.

=== Presidents ===
Fuller has had six presidents over its over 70-year history. The founding president, Harold Ockenga, remained in Boston and served as president in absentia from 1947 to 1954. He described his role to Charles Fuller as recruiting faculty and setting the curriculum, which did not require his active presence in Pasadena. His successor and protege Edward John Carnell, a Baptist theologian and apologist, took over the post in 1954 but resigned in 1959 under failing health. Ockenga resumed his in absentia leadership until 35-year-old David Allen Hubbard, a Baptist Old Testament scholar and member of Fuller's third entering class, became Fuller's third president in 1963. Hubbard served for 30 years and led the seminary through both substantial growth and significant controversy.

Hubbard was succeeded by Reformed philosopher and theologian Richard Mouw, who served as president of Fuller from 1993 to 2013. In 2006, a Los Angeles Times article labeled him as "one of the nation's leading evangelicals". In July 2013, Mark Labberton became the Clifford L. Penner Presidential Chair of Fuller. Labberton, a Presbyterian (USA) pastor, had previously served Fuller as director of the Lloyd John Ogilvie Institute of Preaching since 2009. He retains his position as Lloyd John Ogilvie Associate Professor of Preaching alongside the presidency. Mouw remained at Fuller as Professor of Faith and Public Life until 2020. In October 2021, Labberton announced his retirement.

David Goatley became the sixth president in January 2023. He is the first African American to occupy the role. Goatley is a missions executive and former administrative executive at Duke University.

== Academics ==
Fuller Theological Seminary is organized into the School of Mission and Theology (SMT) and the School of Psychology & Marriage and Family Therapy (SOPMFT). The seminary emphasizes integration between the schools and many students take courses in both. The seminary offers eight masters degrees, seven doctoral degrees, and two certificate programs. Four of the masters degrees are available fully online, and several are available in Korean or Spanish.

Fuller is accredited by the Association of Theological Schools in the United States and Canada and the Western Association of Schools and Colleges. Additionally, the Clinical Psy.D. and Clinical Ph.D. programs of the SOPMFT are accredited by the American Psychological Association. Fuller's student body of 2,897 includes students from 90 countries and 110 denominational backgrounds.

== Campuses ==
Fuller closed Fuller Northwest (Seattle), Fuller Bay Area (Menlo Park), and Fuller Orange County (Irvine). It also reduced degree programs offered in Fuller Colorado (Colorado Springs) and Fuller Arizona (Phoenix). These closures and reductions took place before the 2019–20 academic year.

In May 2009, Fuller opened its 47,000-square-foot (4,400 m^{2}) David Allan Hubbard Library that incorporated the former McAlister Library building on its main campus in Pasadena, California for a total of 90,000-square-foot (8,400 m^{2}).

In 2018, Fuller briefly planned to sell its main campus in Pasadena and move to Pomona. In October 2019 the board of directors voted to cancel the move and remain in Pasadena, citing dramatically escalated costs of construction in Southern California and differences with the City of Pasadena, which affected the sale and sale price of the seminary's Pasadena campus.

Fuller currently has campuses in Pasadena, California; Phoenix, Arizona; and Houston, Texas. The Phoenix and Houston campuses are called Fuller Arizona and Fuller Texas, respectively.

== Community Standards ==
Fuller Theological Seminary has seven statements of community standards which all students and employees are required to sign and follow as a condition of their enrollment and/or employment by Fuller Theological Seminary. As of 2025, Fuller Seminary has fired faculty and expelled students found to be in same-sex marriages or same-sex sexual relationships, and it also requires sexual abstinence for all non-married individuals.

=== Sexual Standards ===
The seminary has expelled students and fired staff who have not agreed to or maintained the seminary’s required community standard of abstinence from homosexual forms of conduct. In 2023 and 2024, the senior director Ruth Schmidt, a long-time employee and student, met with leadership to request "a legal rider that would allow her to respect, but not personally affirm, the standards regarding gay marriage.” The seminary leadership refused to agree to this compromise. As a result, Schmidt chose not to sign the statement of faith and Fuller Seminary fired this employee via Zoom.

In 2021, three LGBTQ former Fuller students joined the class-action lawsuit Elizabeth Hunter et al. vs. U.S. Department of Education, arguing that religious exemptions that allow religious institutions of higher education to discriminate on the basis of sexual orientation or gender identity violate the Constitution. In 2025, Fuller Theological Seminary re-affirmed its policy requiring employees and students to abstain from homosexual conduct as a requirement of their employment and enrollment.

== Social issues ==
Some members of the Fuller Theological Seminary community have expressed personal opinions regarding a variety of social issues. In 2013, one of the seminary's former presidents, Mark Labberton, marched in favor of comprehensive immigration reform and a pathway to citizenship for undocumented immigrants. In 2015, one assistant professor suggested that we learn to respect those who are different from us, including differences in race, gender, sexual orientation, and immigration status. Fuller Studio interviewed a pastor, Michael McBride, who expressed his support for the Black Lives Matter movement. In 2016, the seminary started the first LGBTQ group organized within an evangelical seminary. However, the seminary continues to require all employees and students to abstain from homosexual sexual conduct as a condition of employment and enrollment.

== Awards and prizes ==
Fuller annually awards the David Allan Hubbard Achievement Award to a graduating student from each of Seminary's three schools, in recognition of outstanding work completed while at Fuller. The award was instituted in honor of David Allan Hubbard, an Old Testament scholar, and the third President of Fuller Theological Seminary. Each recipient is chosen by the faculty of their respective school.

== See also ==
- List of Fuller Theological Seminary people
