= 2008 United States presidential debates =

Part of the 2008 U.S. presidential election

- September 26, 2008; October 7, 2008; October 15, 2008

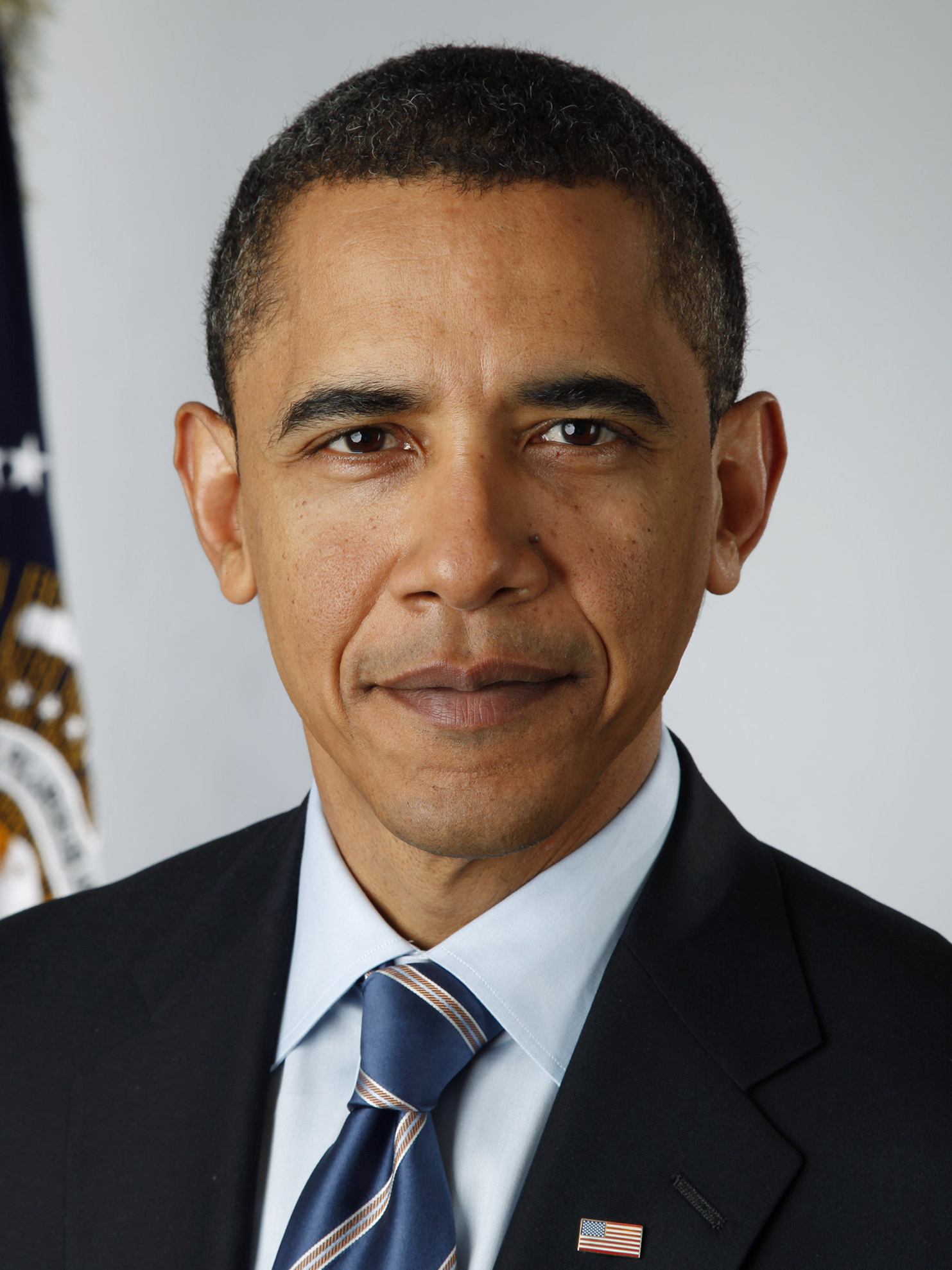
Nominee	John McCain	Barack Obama
Party	Republican	Democratic
Home state	Arizona	Illinois
- 2008 United States vice presidential debate
- October 2, 2008
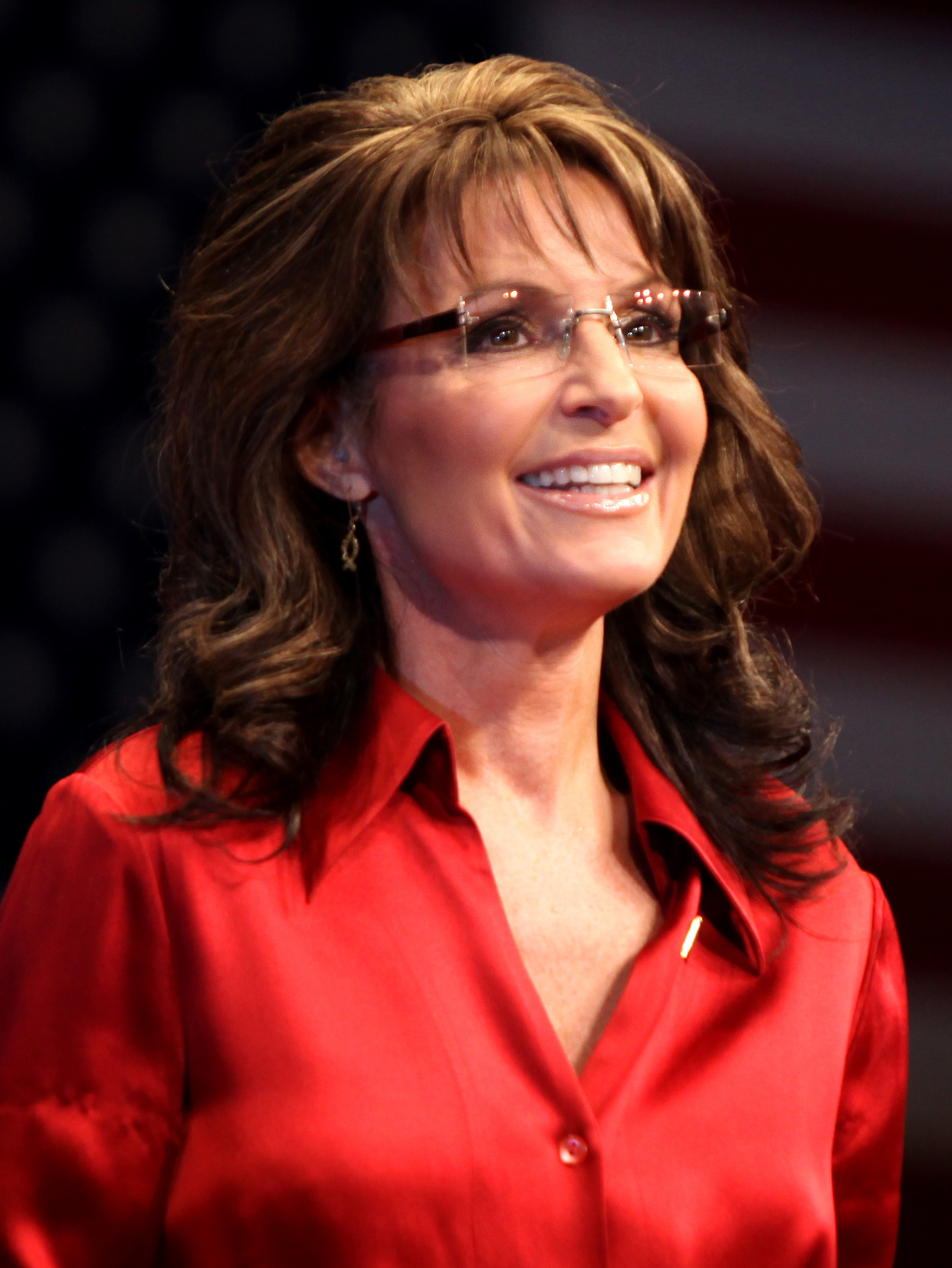

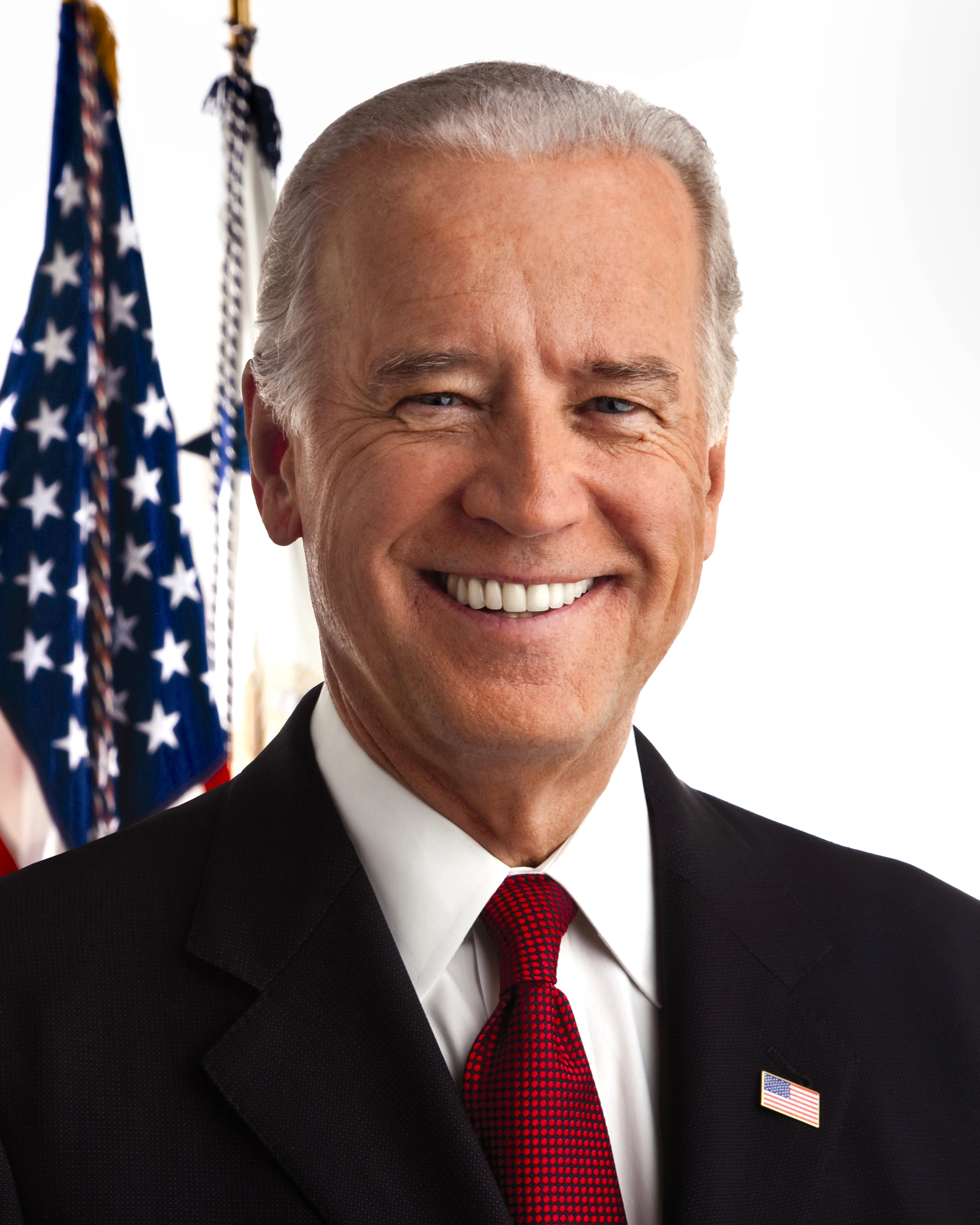
Nominee	Sarah Palin	Joe Biden
Party	Republican	Democratic
Home state	Alaska	Delaware

The 2008 United States presidential debates were a series of debates held during the 2008 presidential election.

The Commission on Presidential Debates (CPD), a bipartisan organization formed in 1987, organized four debates among the major party candidates, sponsored three presidential debates and one vice presidential debate. Only Republican nominee John McCain and Democratic nominee Barack Obama met the criteria for inclusion in the debates, and thus were the only two to appear in the debates sponsored by the Commission on Presidential Debates. The CPD-sponsored vice presidential debate took place between their respective vice presidential running mates, Sarah Palin and Joe Biden.

Both McCain and Obama did not agree to additional debates; however, each was interviewed at the Civil Forum on the Presidency, held on August 16, 2008, and at the Service Nation Presidential Forum on September 11, 2008. Both Palin and Biden also did not participate in any additional debates.

== Joint appearances ==
On Saturday, August 16, 2008, both McCain and Obama appeared at Pastor Rick Warren's Saddleback Church in California. Similar to the Compassion Forum held in the Democratic debates, each candidate appeared separately, answering similar questions from Warren for one hour. Obama appeared first, followed by McCain.

On September 11, 2008, McCain and Obama were separately interviewed at the Service Nation presidential forum at Columbia University.

== Debate schedule ==
2008 United States presidential election debates
No.	Date & Time	Host	Location	Moderator	Participants	
Key: P Participant. N Non-invitee.					Republican	Democratic
Key: P Participant. N Non-invitee.					Senator John McCain of Arizona	Senator Barack Obama of Illinois
1	Friday, September 26, 2008, 9:00 – 10:30 p.m. EDT	University of Mississippi	Oxford, Mississippi	Jim Lehrer of PBS	P	P
2	Tuesday, October 7, 2008, 9:00 – 10:30 p.m. EDT	Belmont University	Nashville, Tennessee	Tom Brokaw of NBC	P	P
3	Wednesday, October 15, 2008, 9:00 – 10:30 p.m. EDT	Hofstra University	Hempstead, New York	Bob Schieffer of CBS	P	P
2008 United States vice presidential debate
No.	Date & Time	Host	Location	Moderator	Participants	
Key: P Participant. N Non-invitee.					Republican	Democratic
Key: P Participant. N Non-invitee.					Governor Sarah Palin of Alaska	Senator Joe Biden of Delaware
VP	Thursday, October 2, 2008, 9:00 – 10:30 p.m. EDT	Washington University in St. Louis	St. Louis, Missouri	Gwen Ifill of PBS	P	P

=== Format ===
The first and third of the 90-minute CPD presidential debates were divided into nine 9-minute issue segments, allowing the candidates to discuss selected topics, answer follow-ups from the moderator and directly address each other. The second CPD presidential debate featured a town hall format in which voters, either present at the debate or via the internet, posed questions on a topic of their choice. The format of the single vice presidential debate followed that of the first and third presidential debates, but included questions on all topics, with shorter response and discussion periods compared to the presidential debates.

=== Participants ===
The Republican nominees were Senator John McCain, and Alaska Governor Sarah Palin. The Democratic nominees were Senators Barack Obama and Joseph Biden. The debates were sponsored by the Commission on Presidential Debates.

On August 2, 2008, Obama accepted the CPD proposal. In his letter, he stated that due to the short period between the conventions and the campaign, that it was "likely that the four Commission debates will be the sole series of debates" between the two. McCain criticized Obama for rejecting his town hall proposal. On August 18, 2008, McCain and Obama announced they had agreed to the general CPD framework for the three scheduled presidential debates and the one vice presidential debate.

=== Criticism ===
A Zogby International poll released on August 15, 2008, indicated that more than 50% of Democratic and Republican voters would like to see Libertarian Party nominee Bob Barr included in the presidential debates. Almost 70% of independent voters would also like to see him included. 46% of all voters polled and 59% of independents would also like to see independent candidate Ralph Nader included.

== September 26: First presidential debate (University of Mississippi) ==
First presidential debate
- Date(s): September 26, 2008
- Duration: 90 minutes
- Venue: University of Mississippi
- Location: Oxford, Mississippi
- Participants: John McCain; Barack Obama
- Moderator(s): Jim Lehrer of PBS

The first presidential debate between Senator John McCain and Senator Barack Obama took place on Friday, September 26, 2008, at University of Mississippi in Oxford, Mississippi. The debate was moderated by Jim Lehrer of PBS.

Although the debate was originally planned to focus on foreign policy and national security, due to the Great Recession Lehrer devoted the first half of the debate to discuss economic issues. McCain repeatedly referred to his experience, drawing on stories from the past. Often, he joked of his age and at one point seemed to mock his opponent. Obama tied McCain to what he characterized as Bush Administration mistakes and repeatedly laid out detailed plans. Neither McCain nor Obama broke from talking points, and neither candidate made any major gaffe.

=== Reception ===
An estimated 52.4 million people watched the debate. A CBS poll conducted after the debate on independent voters found that 38% felt it was a draw, 40% felt Obama had won, and 22% thought that McCain had won. Voters and analysts agreed that Obama had won on the economy, but that McCain had done better on foreign policy issues, which were the focus of the debate. However, Obama had a more substantial lead on the economy than McCain did on foreign policy. Initial CNN polling reported Obama won the debate overall by a margin of 51–38. A CBS poll of uncommitted voters showed Obama winning 39–24, with 37% of voters undecided. Time's Mark Halperin graded Obama's performance an A− and McCain's performance a B−. One analyst, Nate Silver, gave greater emphasis to the fact that Obama spoke more effectively about the issues that mattered most to the voters, an interpretation that was supported by Time commentator Joe Klein.

Several pollsters noted in the subsequent week that the public's perception of the debate might have been influenced by John McCain not looking at, or directly talking to his opponent during the debate, something many considered disrespectful.

=== Proposed postponement ===
On September 24, 2008, McCain announced his intention to suspend his campaign the next day and declared that he wanted to delay the first debate "until we have taken action" on the Paulson financial rescue plan. The reason given for the proposed postponement was so that McCain and Obama could return to Washington, D.C., in order to work on a legislative response to the 2008 financial crisis. Obama rejected that idea, stating that "this is exactly the time when the American people need to hear from the person who, in approximately 40 days, will be responsible for dealing with this mess." A McCain adviser suggested replacing the vice presidential debate with the first presidential debates and postponing the VP debates to an unspecified later date. Chancellor of the University of Mississippi, Robert Khayat, proposed that Obama hold a townhall meeting with the audience if McCain failed to appear. On the morning of September 26, McCain agreed to participate in the debate, claiming that there had been enough progress in the financial bailout plan. Three days later, however, the House of Representatives defeated the bailout proposal.

== October 2: Vice presidential debate (Washington University in St. Louis) ==
Vice presidential debate

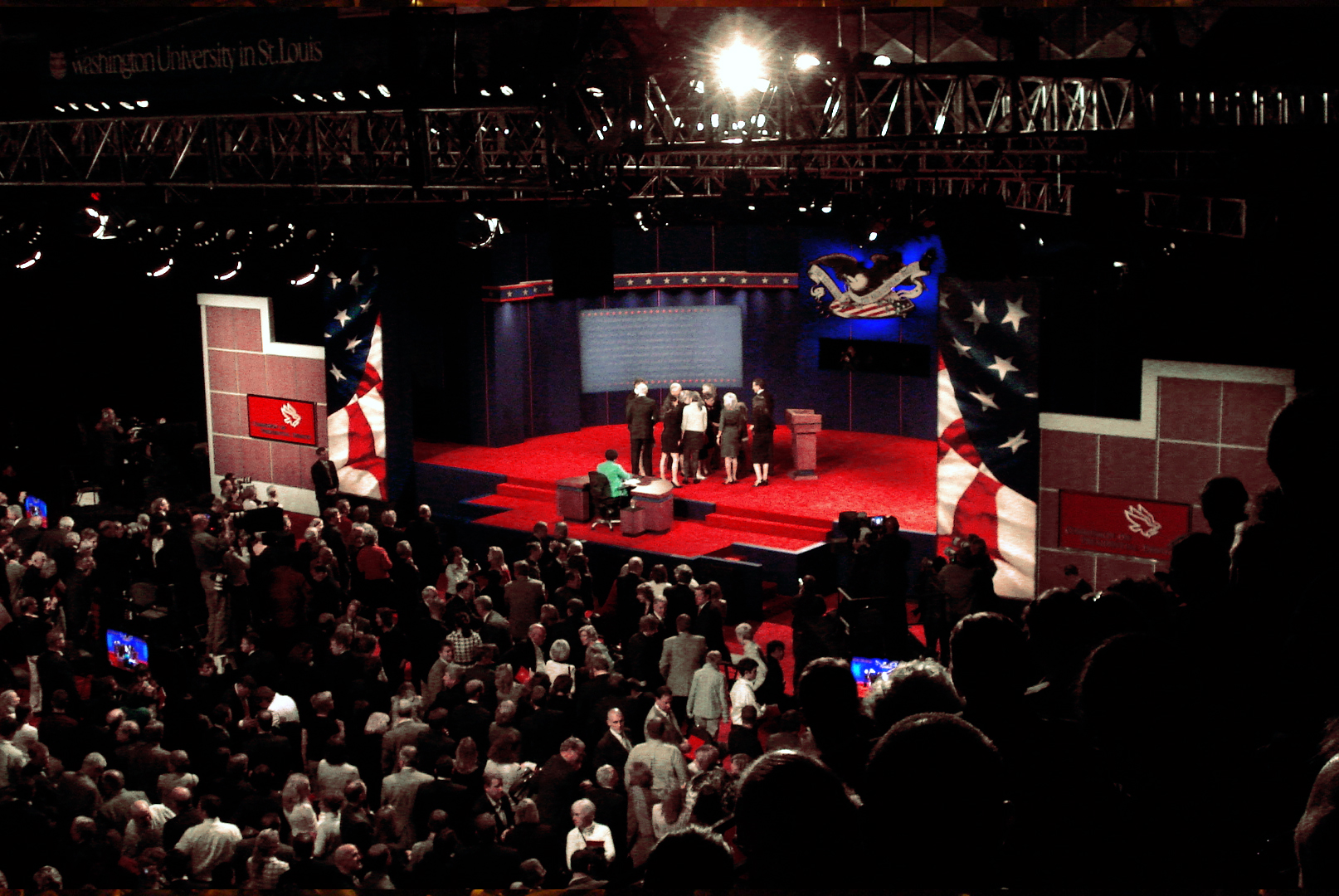
- Date(s): October 2, 2008
- Duration: 90 minutes
- Venue: Washington University in St. Louis
- Location: St. Louis, Missouri
- Participants: Sarah Palin; Joe Biden
- Moderator(s): Gwen Ifill of PBS

The only vice presidential debate between Governor Sarah Palin and Senator Joe Biden took place on Thursday, October 3, 2008, at Washington University in St. Louis, Missouri. The debate was moderated by Gwen Ifill of PBS. It was the first such debate to feature a female candidate since the 1984 vice presidential debate. The debate was watched by about 70 million viewers according to Nielsen Media Research, making it the most-watched vice presidential debate in history. It was only the second presidential or vice presidential debate to surpass 70 million viewers, the first being the 1980 presidential debate between Governor Ronald Reagan and President Jimmy Carter, which drew nearly 81 million viewers.

=== Venue ===
Washington State University in Pullman, Washington, had been offered the opportunity to host the debate, but declined in order to pursue hosting one of the presidential debates. In November 2007 it was announced that Washington University in St. Louis would be the venue for the debate.

=== Debate ===
The first 90-minute presidential debate was divided into nine 3-minute issue segments, allowing the candidates to discuss selected topics, answer follow-ups from a moderator and directly address each other. The vice-presidential debate format followed that of the first presidential debate, but included questions on all topics and had shorter response and discussion periods.

The two candidates had never met before, which was part of the build-up to the debate. Palin said on one of her stump speeches before the debate, "I've never met [Biden] before. But I've been hearing about his Senate speeches since I was in, like, second grade." After moderator Gwen Ifill introduced the candidates, where they came out, Palin asked Biden, "Can I call you Joe?" He replied affirmatively. She said at one point, "I may not answer the questions the way the moderator and you want to hear." Critics said she was avoiding the debate itself, while her supporters could make the claim that she was answering the questions to "Joe six-pack" or "hockey moms". She used her inexperience to her advantage by saying, "It's so obvious that I'm a Washington outsider and not used to the ways you guys operate."

Palin spoke in greatest depth about energy policy while Biden spoke in greatest depth about foreign affairs. Biden refrained from criticizing Palin, concentrating his criticisms on McCain. Although Palin offered brief criticism of Biden, she concentrated most of her criticism on Democratic presidential nominee Barack Obama. Whereas Biden defended against Palin's criticisms of Obama, Palin tended not to offer detailed defenses against Biden's criticisms of Republican nominee John McCain and the George W. Bush administration, emphasizing instead generalizations about McCain and Palin's plans to reform the ways of Washington. Biden let it be known that he thought at one time McCain was a "maverick," but that is no longer the case.

During the debate, Palin talked about a potential surge strategy in Afghanistan and identified the commanding general there as "McClellan." Pundits criticized Biden's omission of the general's name; he referred to him several times only as the "commanding general in Afghanistan," until it was discovered the General's name is in fact David D. McKiernan.

At the end Biden talked about when his wife and daughter died and his sons were injured. He said "The notion that somehow, because I'm a man, I don't know what it's like to raise two kids alone, I don't know what it's like to have a child you're not sure is going to – is going to make it – I understand [...]." Palin did not react to this, instead returning to her campaign's platform.

=== Reception ===
Much interest leading up to the debate stemmed from Governor Palin's poorly handled interviews conducted in the weeks leading up to the event; many of her responses were the brunt of severe criticism, and a poll in early October from the Pew Research Center showed that the number of people who believed Palin was qualified to serve as president had dropped from 52% to 37% in early September. Consequently, the vice-presidential debate was largely seen as an opportunity for further destruction or redemption on Palin's part. Several polls suggested that Biden had won the debate; although, many observers were surprised by Palin's speaking abilities and knowledge of John McCain's policies. CNN polls found Biden won 51 to 36. It is widely agreed that both candidates accurately followed the "do no harm" guideline of vice-presidential debates. James Taylor, professor of political science at the University of San Francisco commented, "[Palin] resuscitated herself, but I'm not sure she did quite enough to do anything for John McCain." He added "Biden demonstrated he knows John McCain better than Sarah Palin does. She couldn't offer rebuttals during the depth of discussions. She read the Cliff Notes on McCain, and Biden has known John McCain."

According to a poll of uncommitted voters conducted immediately after the debate by CBS News and Knowledge Networks, 46% thought Senator Biden won the debate, 21% thought Governor Palin had won, and 33% thought it was a tie. Fox News Channel held a poll regarding the performance of each candidate, with 51% of the votes in favor of Biden, and 39% in favor of Palin. The Opinion Research Corporation's poll on the debate revealed that 51% of viewers felt Biden had won, while 36% were in favor of Palin. In the same poll, 87% said Biden was capable of fulfilling the duties of the vice presidency, while 42% said Palin was capable. Palin was considered more likable however, scoring 54% to Biden's 36%. Mark Halperin of Time graded both candidates' performances a B.

The event overall was widely described as having little effect on the 2008 presidential race, although a CBS News poll found that the presidential race tightened following the vice-presidential debate, with the Obama-Biden lead falling from 9 points to 4 points.

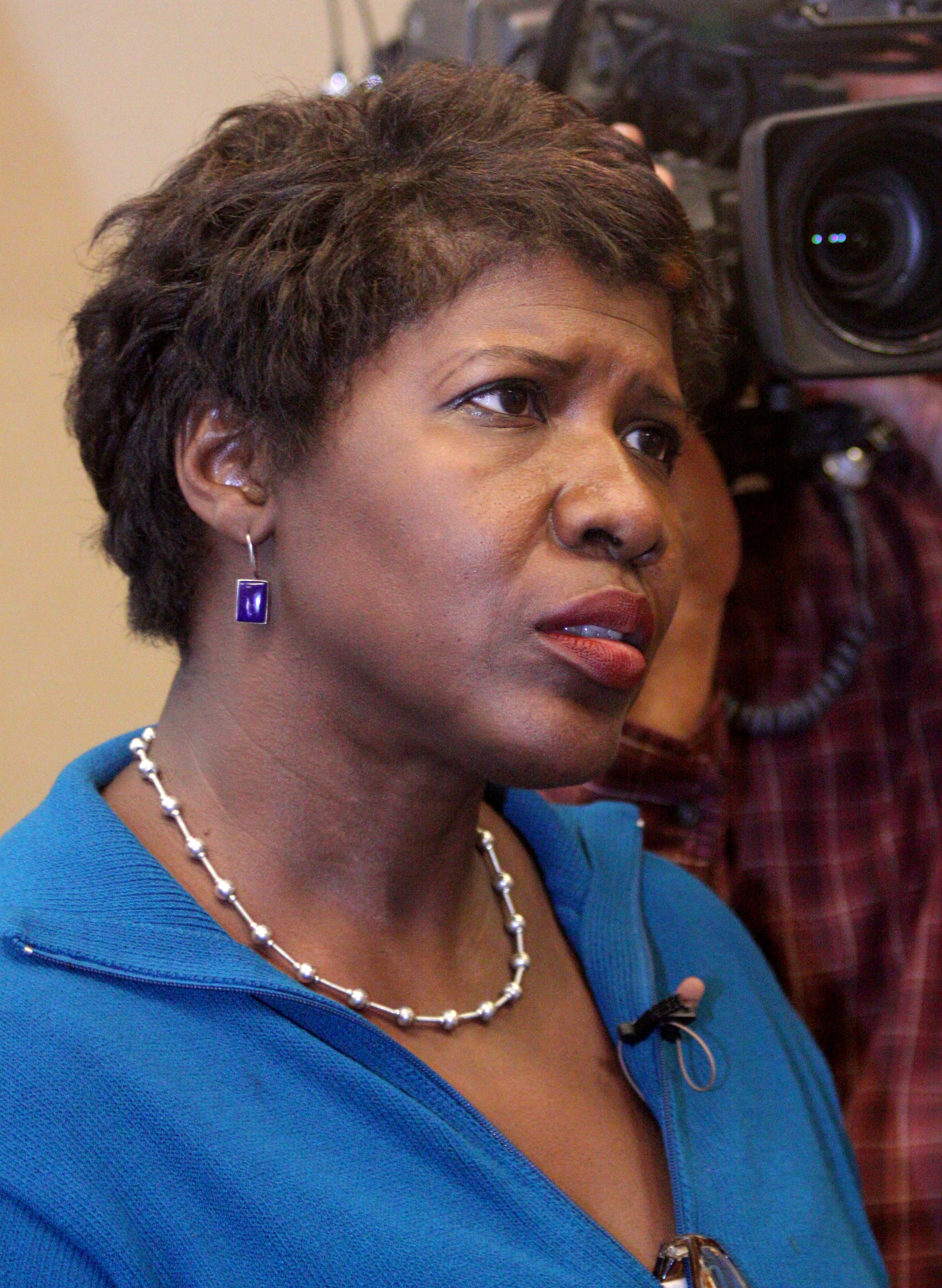
Gwen Ifill served as moderator of the debate.

=== Moderator Gwen Ifill ===
The debate's format offered moderator Gwen Ifill great freedom and power to decide the questions, which could cover domestic or international issues. On the day before the debate, it gained wide media attention that Ifill had authored a new book The Breakthrough: Politics and Race in the Age of Obama, which was to be released by publisher Doubleday on January 20, 2009, the day of the presidential inauguration. Ifill did not inform the debate commission about her book. Fox News' Washington managing editor Brit Hume claimed Ifill had a "financial stake" in an Obama victory because of the profit she stood to make from her book. John McCain said he was confident Ifill would do "a totally objective job," but stated, "Does this help that if she has written a book that's favorable to Senator Obama? Probably not." In response to the controversy, Ifill questioned why people assume that her book will be favorable toward Obama, saying "Do you think they made the same assumptions about Lou Cannon [who is white] when he wrote his book about [Ronald] Reagan?".

A national poll was held immediately following the vice-presidential debate, indicating that 95% of viewers felt Ifill was fair and unbiased.

== October 7: Second presidential debate (Belmont University) ==
Second presidential debate
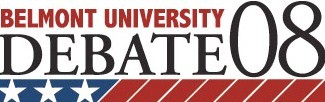
- Date(s): October 7, 2008
- Duration: 90 minutes
- Venue: Belmont University
- Location: Nashville, Tennessee
- Participants: John McCain; Barack Obama
- Moderator(s): Tom Brokaw of NBC

The second presidential debate between Senator John McCain and Senator Barack Obama took place on Tuesday, October 7, 2008, at Belmont University in Nashville, Tennessee. The debate was moderated by Tom Brokaw of NBC.

The debate was opened by stating that since the first debate, a lot had changed in the world and for the worse. While Brokaw did not ask the initial questions, he did ask follow-up ones. When the candidates were asked who they would consider as the next Secretary of the Treasury, McCain said that he might concur with Obama's suggestion of Berkshire Hathaway CEO Warren Buffett and then went on also to suggest former eBay president Meg Whitman. Obama reiterated the mention of Buffett and said there are also many other qualified Americans. Both candidates said that it is important to choose as Treasury Secretary someone who earns the trust of the American people. The first 5 questions all were related to the economy.

The first Internet question came from a 78-year-old, as Brokaw pointed out, "child of the Depression" about sacrifices that Americans might have to make in the future. McCain responded that spending– besides defense, veterans' affairs, and certain other programs that he specified during the first debate– would have to be frozen.

McCain was critical of Obama's support for a $3 million earmark which would have bought a new planetarium projector for Chicago's Adler Planetarium, the oldest planetarium in the Western Hemisphere. The current Zeiss Mark VI projector is 40 years old and no longer supported by its manufacturer, Carl Zeiss AG. McCain referred to it as an overhead projector. The earmark was not approved.

=== Reception ===
CNN's poll conducted after the debate found that 54% of those surveyed thought that Obama had won and 30% felt McCain had won. In CBS's poll of uncommitted voters, 40% felt Obama had won, 26% thought McCain had won, and 34% said it was a tie. Time's Mark Halperin graded Obama's performance a B+ and McCain's performance a B.

Several media outlets, especially those on the Internet, reported controversy over McCain referring to Obama as "that one" while discussing energy policy. Many critics of McCain, including the Obama campaign, compared it to the first debate, when McCain did not look at Obama. This incident was recreated on Saturday Night Live, with the actor portraying McCain referring to his opponent as "this character here," "junior," and "pee-pants." Many comedy show performers - Jay Leno, Conan O'Brien, Jon Stewart and the Saturday Night Live crew - also lampooned McCain's habit of "wandering aimlessly about the stage" during the debate while Obama was speaking.

== October 15: Third presidential debate (Hofstra University) ==
Third presidential debate
- Date(s): October 15, 2008
- Duration: 90 minutes
- Venue: Hofstra University
- Location: Hempstead, New York
- Participants: John McCain; Barack Obama
- Moderator(s): Bob Schieffer of CBS

The third and final presidential debate between Senator John McCain and Senator Barack Obama took place on Wednesday, October 15, 2008, in the David S. Mack Sports and Exhibition Complex on the campus of Hofstra University in Hempstead, New York. The debate was moderated by Bob Schieffer of CBS. The focus was on domestic policy and the economy.

=== Joe the Plumber ===
During the debate repeated references were made to Joe Wurzelbacher, aka "Joe the Plumber". Wurzelbacher had spoken with Obama while he was campaigning in Holland, Ohio. Wurzelbacher claimed that Obama's tax policy would make it difficult for him to expand his business and hire more employees if he bought the business at which he had been employed as a plumber. Obama gave a five-minute response where he said "under his proposal taxes on any revenue from $250,000 on down would stay the same, but that amounts above that level would be subject to a 39 percent tax, instead of the current 36 percent rate", and that his plan includes a 50 percent small-business tax credit for health care and a proposal to eliminate the capital-gains tax for small businesses that increase in value, and "I think when you spread the wealth around, it's good for everybody", which Wurzelbacher later dismissed as "tap dancing...he was almost as good as Sammy Davis Jr.".

In the debate, McCain repeatedly brought up "Joe the Plumber" and Obama and McCain then made statements aimed directly at Wurzelbacher. These events led to subsequent media attention directed at Wurzelbacher. He reportedly had been registered to vote in 1992 under the name "Samuel Joseph Worzelbacher", and voted in his first primary on March 4 of this year, registering as a Republican. After the debate, Wurzelbacher did not declare his vote for either candidate, although he expressed concern that Obama's plans were "one step closer to socialism." Obama's running mate Joe Biden argued that the vast majority of small businesses are smaller than Wurzelbacher's.

In an interview the day after the debate, Wurzelbacher said Obama's tax plan wouldn't affect him right now, because he doesn't make $250,000. He also indicated to reporters that he was a conservative, a fan of the military and McCain. He said meeting McCain would be an honor but said he hadn't been contacted by the Republican campaign.

=== Reception ===
CNN's poll conducted after the debate found that 58% of those surveyed thought that Obama had won and 31% felt McCain had won. In CBS's poll of uncommitted voters, 53% felt Obama had won and 22% thought McCain had won, Obama's largest margin of victory of the three debates. A Politico poll of undecided voters, conducted over a 15-minute period following the completion of the presidential debate, showed that 49% felt Obama won, while 46% believed McCain won the debate. Among respondents not identified with either major political party, McCain was judged the night's winner, 51-42 percent. Obama's most important lead may have come among Hispanic voters, who said he bested McCain by a 50-36 percent margin.

Bruce Merrill, professor of media and mass communications at Arizona State University, claimed, "I really think that [McCain's] negativism, the attack mode was one that does not play well with women and independents." Many observers felt that Obama had to simply avoid stumbles or mistakes in order to succeed in the debate. This was reflected in another professor's sentiments: "I didn't think Obama was as comfortable this time as he was in the other two debates, but I didn't really hear any gaffe, any major mistake," said Larry Sabato, director of the University of Virginia Center for Politics. Sabato added, "he might even be judged the winner." Time's Mark Halperin graded McCain's performance an A− and Obama's performance a B.

== Third party debates ==
Several third-party debates were held in 2008.

Presidential debates

Third-party debates, 2008
N°	Date	Host	Location	Moderator(s)	Participants					
P Participant. N Non-invitee. A Absent invitee.					Democratic	Republican	Libertarian	Green	Constitution	Independent
P Participant. N Non-invitee. A Absent invitee.					Senator Barack Obama of Illinois	Senator John McCain of Arizona	Congressman Bob Barr of Georgia	Congresswoman Cynthia McKinney of Georgia	Pastor Chuck Baldwin of Florida	Advocate Ralph Nader of Connecticut
D1	October 15, 2008	Columbia University	New York City	Amy Goodman of C-SPAN	N	N	A	P	P	P
D2	October 23, 2008	Mayflower Renaissance Hotel	Washington, D.C.	Chris Hedges	A	A	A	A	P	P

Vice presidential debates

Third-party debates, 2008
N°	Date	Host	Location	Moderator(s)	Participants					
P Participant. N Non-invitee. A Absent invitee.					Democratic	Republican	Libertarian	Green	Constitution	Independent
P Participant. N Non-invitee. A Absent invitee.					Senator Joe Biden of Delaware	Governor Sarah Palin of Alaska	Businessman Wayne Allyn Root of Nevada	Activist Rosa Clemente of New York	Lawyer Darrell Castle	Supervisor Matt Gonzalez of California
D1	November 2, 2008	University of Nevada, Las Vegas	Las Vegas		A	A	P	A	P	P

=== October 15: C-SPAN (Columbia University) ===
The first of two televised third-party debates was held October 15 at Columbia University. The debate was broadcast by C-SPAN. It included Independent candidate Ralph Nader, Constitution Party candidate Chuck Baldwin, and Green Party candidate Cynthia McKinney. It was hosted by Amy Goodman, moderator of the widely syndicated TV/radio program Democracy Now!

Libertarian candidate Bob Barr was invited, but declined to participate (citing scheduling conflicts).

=== October 23: Free & Equal debate (Washington, D.C.) ===
The second of the televised third-party debates was sponsored by the Free & Equal Elections Foundation and took place in Washington, D.C., on October 23. The third-party candidates who could theoretically win the 270 votes needed to win the election were invited, and Independent candidate Ralph Nader and Constitution party candidate Chuck Baldwin attended. Journalist Chris Hedges moderated. It was broadcast on cable by C-SPAN and on the Internet by Break-the-Matrix (BtM), one of the event sponsors (Other sponsors included Open Debates, the Daily Paul, and Steal Back Your Vote).

Libertarian candidate Bob Barr was invited, but declined to participate (citing scheduling conflicts).

=== November 2: Free & Equal vice presidential debate (Las Vegas) ===
On November 2, at the University of Nevada, Las Vegas, a third-party debate was hosted by the Free & Equal Elections Foundation. Libertarian VP nominee Wayne Allyn Root, Constitution Party VP nominee Darrell Castle, and independent VP nominee Matt Gonzalez participated.

=== Other ===
==== Alternative Presidential Candidates' Debate ====
An Alternative Presidential Candidates' Debate was hosted by The Coalition for October Debate Alternatives (CODA), the Nashville Peace Coalition, and Vanderbilt Students of Nonviolence at Vanderbilt University, moderated by Bruce Barry. The participants were Bradford Lyttle of the U.S. Pacifist Party, Charles Jay of the Boston Tea Party, Gloria LaRiva of the Party for Socialism and Liberation, Frank McEnulty of the New American Independent Party, Vice-Presidential candidate Darrell Castle of the Constitution Party and Brian Moore of the Socialist Party.

==== October 28: Third Party Forum (Cypress College) ====
On October 28, a Third Party Forum was held at Cypress College hosted by Associated Students. Bradford Lyttle and Frank McEnulty participated as well as representatives for the Constitution Party, Green Party, and Nader campaign. A sixth, Bruce Bongardt, also participated describing himself as a "virtual candidate" who was not on the ballot but wanted to share his ideas.

== Proposed debates that did not materialize ==
=== Proposals by third parties ===
In November 2007, the CPD rejected New Orleans as a debate site on grounds that the city had not recovered sufficiently from Hurricane Katrina to handle such an event. The decision was criticized, and various candidates and newspapers urged the commission to hold a debate in New Orleans.

On April 29, 2008, Google and YouTube announced that they would sponsor a U.S. Presidential Forum, to be held on September 18 at the New Orleans Morial Convention Center. It was intended to be hosted by The New Orleans Consortium, which consists of Women of the Storm and the Greater New Orleans Foundation as well as Dillard University, Loyola University New Orleans, Tulane University, and Xavier University. Unlike debates organized by the CPD, the 15% polling threshold was substituted with a threshold for participation at "no less than 10 percent of the voting age population intending to vote, as measured by at least three nationally-recognized public opinion surveys." This non-CPD sanctioned event was canceled because no candidates or parties agreed to appear.

At the end of August 2008, Barack Obama and John McCain agreed to participate in a written "debate" on scientific issues, organized by a coalition of scientific, professional and media organizations called ScienceDebate.org. On August 30, Obama's responses were published in Nature magazine, and McCain's were published on September 15, 2008.

=== Proposals by the candidates ===
In June 2008, John McCain proposed 10 town-hall style debates, considered his best format. Obama proposed five total debates between June and Election Day: three traditional debates plus a joint town hall on the economy in July and an "in-depth debate" on foreign policy in August.

== See also ==
- John McCain 2008 presidential campaign
- Barack Obama 2008 presidential campaign
- 2008 United States presidential election
- United States presidential election debates
- 2008 Democratic Party presidential debates and forums
- 2008 Republican Party presidential debates and forums
