= Tony Blair Faith Foundation =

Charitable foundation

- Registration no.: 1123243
- Headquarters: London
- Budget: £2,836,000
- Staff: 30
- Website: www.tonyblairfaithfoundation.org/

The Tony Blair Faith Foundation was an interfaith charitable foundation established in May 2008 by former British prime minister Tony Blair. Since December 2016 its work has been continued by the Tony Blair Institute for Global Change.

== Launch ==
The Foundation was launched in May 2008 in New York at the headquarters of the media group Time Warner. In his speech, Blair outlined the Foundation's aim that "idealism becomes the new realism", and that one of its goals was to "counter extremism in all six leading religions" (i.e., according to the Foundation, Buddhism, Christianity, Islam, Hinduism, Judaism, and Sikhism). Blair said that while in office, he feared being exposed as a "nutter" if he had talked about his religious views. Former US president Bill Clinton attended the launch, describing Blair as "a good man as well as a great leader". In an interview with Time magazine, Blair said the Foundation was "how I want to spend the rest of my life".

The foundation listed several goals: "The foundation provides the practical support required to help prevent religious prejudice, conflict and extremism. At school, university and professional level the foundation provides various education programmes. The foundation encouraged interfaith initiatives to tackle global poverty and conflict."

The Foundation's basic premises, as listed in its initial mission statement, were that 1) faith is important to many, underpinning their systems of thought, their behaviour and the behaviour of many of the world's progressive movements, and that 2) the great religions share values of respect, justice and compassion. But the statement also recognised that faith can be divisive, too; this is viewed by the Foundation as being based on distortions of faith rather than being intrinsic to it.

The aim of the Foundation was to use the tools of modern communication to "educate, inform and develop understanding" about various faiths, and the relationships between them. It aimed to do this in such a way as to address global poverty and conflict.

The Foundation had several projects: Faith and Globalisation Initiative, Face to Faith (later Generation Global), Faiths Act (an activist group), and Faith Shorts (for short religious films).

=== Faith and Globalisation Initiative ===
Faith and Globalisation Initiative launched in Yale University in September 2008 was an attempt to build a "global conversation" between an "elite group" of universities. As part of this attempt, Blair was to be the Howland Distinguished Fellow at Yale and was one of the professors for the course.

=== Face to Faith ===
Face to Faith was a programme for schoolchildren (12–17 years) which allowed via videoconferencing international interaction where cross-faith discussions may take place. The proclaimed aim was to break down religious and cultural differences and thereby reduce conflict.

=== Faiths Act initiative ===
Faiths Act was a project of the Foundation described as an attempt to build a global movement to both "inspire and mobilise" those who believe, in a faith, to address the Millennium Development Goals. The project focused on deaths from malaria.

=== Faith Shorts film project ===
The project known as Faith Shorts was announced in March 2010 for short-length movies which increase "understanding between religions". Awards were presented for the films rated highest.

== Directors, executives and advisors ==
Angela Salt was the executive director of the foundation, which was registered as charity in the UK with Tony Blair as its Patron. The trustees were Robert Clinton, Robert Coke and Jeremy Sinclair. The Foundation was also registered as a charity in the US with the following directors: Alfred E. Smith IV, Linda LeSourd Lader, Ruth Turner, Timothy C. Collins and Tony Blair. Ruth Turner, formerly Director of Government Relations within Tony Blair's Prime Ministerial office, was the first Chief Executive.

=== International Religious Advisory Council ===
The Foundation had an International Religious Advisory Council made up of members of what the Foundation considered to be the six major religions. Its role was to advise Tony Blair on the work of the Foundation. Its members were:

Buddhism

- Roshi Joan Halifax, Abbot of the Upaya Zen Center

Christianity

- Rick Warren, Founding and Senior Pastor of Saddleback Church and Founder of the P.E.A.C.E Coalition.
- Josiah Idowu-Fearon, Secretary General of the Anglican Consultative Council
- Richard Chartres, Bishop of London
- David Coffey, president of the Baptist World Alliance
- Joel Edwards, Director of Micah Challenge International and former General Director of the Evangelical Alliance.

Hinduism

- Anantanand Rambachan, Professor and Chair of the Religion Department at St. Olaf College, Minnesota

Judaism

- Rabbi David Rosen, Chairman of the International Jewish Committee on Interreligious Consultations
- Chief Rabbi Lord Sacks, Chief Rabbi of the United Hebrew Congregations of the Commonwealth

Islam

- Mustafa Cerić, Grand Mufti of Bosnia and Herzegovina
- Ismail Khudr Al-Shatti, Advisor in Diwan of the prime minister of Kuwait and former president of the Gulf Institute for Futures and Strategic Studies

Sikhism

- Jagtar Singh Grewal, former chairman of the India Institute of Advanced Study and former vice-chancellor of Guru Nanak Dev University

== Funding ==
A major contributor was Ukrainian oligarch Victor Pinchuk through his Victor Pinchuk Foundation.

== Criticism ==
Hugh O'Shaughnessy in The Guardian stated that the Foundation "inspires ridicule". He noted that Professor Michel Schooyans of the Catholic University of Leuven and the Pontifical Academy of Social Sciences "accused Blair and his wife of supporting a messianic US plan for world domination." The criticism's focus was that the Foundation's approach amounted to reducing the religions to the same, predetermined common denominator. This meant "stripping them of their identity". Schooyans arguing that "(t)his project threatens to set us back to an age in which political power was ascribed the mission of promoting a religious confession, or of changing it. In the case of the Tony Blair Faith Foundation, this is also a matter of promoting one and only one religious confession, which a universal, global political power would impose on the entire world."

The director of the Muslim charity Forward Thinking, Huda Jawad was reported by the BBC as raising doubts about levels of support from many Muslims for the Foundation, given Blair's foreign-policy record.

On 2 April 2009, sceptic and secularist Richard Dawkins mocked the Foundation in a spoof letter, published in the New Statesman. In it, Dawkins ridiculed the idea that faith is not a divisive force, and attacked religion's record on promoting dialogue and equality.

Between April 2008 and April 2009, the foundation raised more than 3.5 million pounds, and paid, according to the Daily Telegraph, six-figure salaries to its top officials. An implied criticism was that these pay scales were in line with much larger charitable organisations. However, the wages were also reported to be the result of external recommendations and a strategy of hiring a small number of capable senior staff to co-ordinate a variety of efforts.

A former editor of a Foundation website, Martin Bright, was critical of the organisation and its style. He mentioned the problems associated with the need to tiptoe around some of Tony Blair's business interests in Kazakhstan, Romania and the Gulf, his advising of the new government of Egypt being "a nightmare", the organisation's use of "ritzy offices in a West End tower block", the employment of five people in a communications department "whose sole aim seemed to be to say as little as possible" and the use of unpaid interns.
