= West Bromwich Network Church =

West Bromwich Network Church is a new Christian church that was planted in January 2007 by Rev. Evan Cockshaw, working on behalf of the Church of England's Lichfield Diocese, in partnership with West Bromwich & District YMCA and the Walter Stanley Trust. The role of West Bromwich Network Church (WBNC) is to create new forms of church for the 20-30s generation across the deanery of West Bromwich. It has no pre-defined criteria, other than to reach out to a generation unconnected to Christian faith.

== A Fresh Expression ==
Fresh Expressions is the name of the controversial joint Church of England and Methodist venture whose aim is to produce "a form of church for our changing culture, established primarily for the benefit of people who are not yet members of any church." The presumption is therefore that the "form of church" is the problem, rather than the substance (see "Critique" below). West Bromwich Network Church is one of the foremost examples of this project. The Diocese of Lichfield advertised nationally for a new Pioneer Leader and committed to a seven-year funding programme for the experimental work of West Bromwich Network Church. West Bromwich Network Church is one of four Pioneer Leader posts created by Lichfield Diocese since 2004. The full title of these posts is generally "Pioneer Leader for new missional communities." The other three posts were in Stoke (Rev. Gordon Crowther), Telford (Mark Berry), and Wolverhampton (Rev. Richard Moy). These four posts were commissioned to explore new ways of being church in four different contexts over a sustained period, in order that sustainable communities of faith might be developed in each place, and so other churches can learn from their experiences. The BBC had recently produced a programme called "The Most Godless Town in Britain" featuring the work of Mark Berry. The Archdeacon of Walsall, Bob Jackson, author of "Hope for the Church" and "The Road to Growth" was the senior member of the management group directly overseeing the work of West Bromwich Network Church.

== Influences ==
A number of influences can be discerned. WBNC uses a cell church model for its structures: it has developed a network of small groups meeting in homes, work places and social gathering points in which people share their faith and their lives together. It also is influenced by a book called The Purpose Driven Church by Rick Warren, and the "Seeker Friendly" approach of Bill Hybels and Willow Creek Community Church. A further influence is Rob Bell and Mars Hill Bible Church.

== Critique ==
Fresh Expressions like this have yet to respond to a number of methodological critiques. It is unlikely that the cultural location of the church signified by organisational aspects and reference points is the only reason for church decline, even in a context like West Bromwich. The church like any other organisation, is a complex environment with many relevant factors. According to leadership theory, a gifted leader can often make the difference between success and failure; the success of an enterprise like this may not really tell the Lichfield Diocese anything, except that it has at least one effective minister. The claimed usefulness of such a project as a model is therefore threatened, as it is necessary for a model to focus in particular and precise ways. The nature of a Fresh Expressions project like this may be more about form than substance, and clarification of the key spiritual features in spiritual formation can be weak. Cockshaw makes the common mistake of believing that he has a "blank sheet of paper" in planting a new church, which can give full reign to unacknowledged paradigms. Attention should focus on the weakness of what is expressed, rather than the "freshness" of its expression. Greater methodological insight will assist its effectiveness as helpful pioneering work, enabling some useful learning to emerge from West Bromwich and the Network Church.
