= The Purpose Driven Life =

2002 Bible study book by Rick Warren

The Purpose Driven Life: What on Earth Am I Here For?
- Book cover
- Author: Rick Warren
- Language: English
- Subject: Bible study
- Publisher: Zondervan
- Publication date: 2002
- Publication place: United States
- Media type: Print
- ISBN: 9780310803065
- OCLC: 51813195

The Purpose Driven Life: What on Earth Am I Here For? is a Bible study book written by Christian pastor Rick Warren and published by Zondervan in 2002. The book offers readers a 40-day personal spiritual journey and presents what Warren says are God's five purposes for human life on Earth.

== Background ==
Warren was encouraged in his 20s by minister and evangelist Billy Graham after he wrote his first book: Rick Warren's Bible Study Methods. It greatly inspired Warren when he had "little confidence" in his writing ability:

The Purpose Driven Life might have never been written if Billy Graham had not believed in me.

The 2002 book The Purpose Driven Life is a sequel to his 1995 book The Purpose Driven Church.

== Summary ==
The book is intended to be read as a daily inspiration, with each of the 40 short chapters read on consecutive days. Each chapter contains a personal application section at the end with a "point to ponder," a verse to remember, and a question to consider over the course of that day. Rick Warren described his book as an "anti-self-help book." The first sentence of the book reads, "It's not about you," and the remainder of the chapter goes on to explain how the quest for personal fulfillment, satisfaction, and meaning can only be found in understanding and doing what God placed you on Earth to do. The book's 40 chapters are divided into six major sections, with the following titles:

- What on Earth Am I Here For?
- Purpose #1: You Were Planned for God's Pleasure (Christian Worship)
- Purpose #2: You Were Formed for God's Family (Christian Fellowship)
- Purpose #3: You Were Created to Become Like Christ (Discipleship)
- Purpose #4: You Were Shaped for Serving God (Christian Ministry)
- Purpose #5: You Were Made for a Mission (Christian Mission)

In later versions of the book, two additional chapters were added about the two biggest reasons why Christians do not live purpose driven lives: envy and "people pleasing."

== Reception ==
=== Sales ===
The book topped the Wall Street Journal best seller charts as well as Publishers Weekly charts. The Purpose Driven Life was also on the New York Times Bestseller List for over 90 weeks. It had sold over 18 million copies by 2008, and 32 million copies within its first decade, by 2012. According to both the author and publisher Zondervan, 50 million copies had been sold in more than 85 languages by 2020.

=== Impact ===
A May 2005 survey of American pastors and ministers conducted by George Barna asked Christian leaders to identify what books were the most influential on their lives and ministries. The Purpose Driven Life was the most frequent response. The Purpose Driven Church, written prior to The Purpose Driven Life, was the second most frequent response. New Testament scholar Robert M. Price suggested Warren applied eisegesis, arguing he selectively chose paraphrases or Bible translations that supported his theses. Jason Harris criticized the book for only citing the scripture in endnotes, stating it made it harder for readers to know the context of the passages it cites. Billy Graham described the book as one that would "guide you to greatness—through living the Great Commandment and the Great Commission of Jesus."

In 2005, after the president of Rwanda, Paul Kagame, read the book, he invited Warren to develop the P.E.A.C.E. Plan in the country.

In 2021, actress and singer Selena Gomez stated that she had read the book three times.

=== In popular culture ===
In 2005, the book received notice due to the recapture of Brian Nichols, who had killed three people while escaping from the Fulton County Courthouse in Atlanta, Georgia. Nichols had broken into the home of Ashley Smith, who pacified him by giving him methamphetamine and reading him portions of The Purpose Driven Life over a period of seven hours. Smith credits the book as influencing his decision to release her from captivity. Sales of The Purpose Driven Life increased following the news of Smith's captivity and release and the story formed the basis of the 2015 film Captive.

In 2009, singer Carrie Underwood was inspired by the book to write the song "Temporary Home". Filipino singer Jamie Rivera was also inspired by the book to release a studio album called The Purpose Driven Life. The album became a hit in the Philippines, receiving gold and platinum awards.

NFL legend Ray Lewis gave the book to 23-time Olympic gold medalist Michael Phelps when he went to rehab. Phelps was deeply touched by the book. He read it while in rehab, even to other patients, earning him the nickname "Preacher Mike".

In NBC's comedy The Office, Angela is asked what three books she would take with her to a desert island; she chooses the Bible and A Purpose Driven Life.

== See also ==
- Christian literature
- Saddleback Church

== Bibliography ==
- Warren, Rick (2002). The Purpose Driven Life. Michigan: Zondervan. ISBN 9780310803065.
