= Captive (2015 film) =

- Theatrical release poster
- Directed by: Jerry Jameson
- Screenplay by: Brian Bird; Reinhard Denke
- Based on: Unlikely Angel by Ashley Smith
- Produced by: Lucas Akoskin; Terry Botwick; Alex Garcia; David Oyelowo; Ken Wales; Katrina Wolfe
- Starring: David Oyelowo; Kate Mara; Leonor Varela; Jessica Oyelowo; Mimi Rogers; Michael K. Williams
- Cinematography: Luis David Sansans
- Edited by: Melissa Kent
- Music by: Lorne Balfe
- Production companies: BN Films; Brightside Entertainment; 1019 Entertainment; Yoruba Saxon Productions; Itaca Films
- Distributed by: Paramount Pictures
- Release date: September 18, 2015 (United States)
- Running time: 97 minutes
- Country: United States
- Language: English
- Budget: $2 million
- Box office: $2.8 million

Captive is a 2015 American crime-drama thriller film directed by Jerry Jameson and written by Brian Bird and Reinhard Denke, based on the non-fiction book Unlikely Angel by Ashley Smith.

A true story about Brian Nichols, who escapes from the Fulton County courthouse in Atlanta on March 11, 2005 and holds Ashley Smith as a hostage, the film stars David Oyelowo as Nichols and Kate Mara as Smith. Filming began in October 2013 in North Carolina. The film was released worldwide on September 18, 2015 by Paramount Pictures.

== Plot ==
On March 11, 2005, Brian Nichols escapes from the Fulton County courthouse in Atlanta, during his trial involving a rape case. In the process of the escape he murders the judge presiding over his trial, Rowland Barnes, as well as court reporter Julie Brandau. He also shoots Sergeant Hoyt Teasley while escaping from the courthouse, and later kills ICE Special Agent David G. Wilhelm, who was off-duty at his home.

Nichols becomes the subject of a citywide manhunt. His frantic escape brings him to the apartment of Ashley Smith, a single mother and recovering methamphetamine addict, whom he holds hostage. Smith gets through the time by being inspired by Rick Warren's best-selling book The Purpose Driven Life while Nichols searches for redemption. As she reads aloud, Smith and her would-be killer come to a crossroads. Nichols eventually turns himself in to the police.

== Cast ==
- David Oyelowo as Brian Nichols, a convicted criminal who takes Ashley Smith hostage while on the run from the police
- Kate Mara as Ashley Smith, a young woman and single mother held captive by Nichols who tries to get through him by reading "A Purpose Driven Life"
- Michael K. Williams as Detective John Chestnut
- Leonor Varela as Detective Carmen Sanchez
- Jessica Oyelowo as Meredith MacKenzie
- Mimi Rogers as Kim Rogers
- Matt Lowe as Randy
- E. Roger Mitchell as Sergeant Teasley
- Bill Bennett as Sheriff Walters
- Scott Parks as Officer Henderson
- J. Karen Thomas as Mrs. Nichols, Brian's estranged wife
- Fred Galle as Atlanta Police Officer Boltbee
- Elle Graham as Paige
- Johanna Jowett as Cameron Sampson
- Claudia Church as Melissa
- Michael Harding as Commander Bradley Simpson
- William Boyer as Sniper
- Sydelle Noel as Lynn Campbell

== Production ==
=== Development ===
On October 15, 2013, David Oyelowo and Kate Mara joined the thriller Captive based on the true story of Brian Nichols, who escaped from the courthouse in Atlanta on March 11, 2005; he murdered the judge, a court reporter, a sheriff's deputy, and an off-duty federal agent. Later, he takes Ashley Smith hostage at her own house. BN Films set Jerry Jameson to direct the film, which was adapted by Brian Bird and Reinhard Denke, based on Smith's non-fiction Unlikely Angel. Alex Garcia, Lucas Akoskin, Terry Botwick, Oyelowo, and Ken Wales would be producing the film through Brightside Entertainment, 1019 Entertainment, and Yoruba Saxon Productions. Oyelowo was set to play Nichols, Mara to play Smith, with Leonor Varela and Mimi Rogers also in the cast. Michael K. Williams joined the film's cast on October 24, 2013 to play Detective John Chestnut. Jessica Oyelowo, Oyelowo's real-life wife, her involvement was confirmed on March 16, 2015, along with Jameson and Katrina Wolfe as producers.

=== Filming ===
Principal photography on the film began in October 2013 in North Carolina.

== Release ==
On March 16, 2015, Paramount Pictures acquired the worldwide distribution rights to the film and set the film for a September 18, 2015 release date. On June 16, 2015, the first trailer for the film was released.

== Reception ==
On Rotten Tomatoes, the film holds a rating of 28%, based on 50 reviews, with an average rating of 4.50/10. The site's consensus reads, "Captive undermines committed performances from Kate Mara and David Oyelowo -- and the real-life story they're dramatizing -- with a thin script doubling as an ad for a self-help book." On Metacritic the film has a weighted average score of 36 out of 100, based on 19 critics, indicating "generally unfavorable" reviews.

James Rocchi of TheWrap called it "A Lifetime movie shoved into a cage and fattened with sermons and platitudes until it is ready to be served up cold and bland." But Linda Cook of the Quad City Times called it "a top-notch, captivating film." Michael Foust of The Christian Post labeled it "one of the most inspiring movies I've ever seen" and added it was "not the typical Christian movie." Foust wrote, "I suspect the movie ... succeeds because we can see a bit of ourselves in Smith or even Oyelowo, two broken people whose lives intersect on a tragic day in which the power of God's Word triumphed."

== Inaccuracies ==
In the film, Nichols is depicted shooting Judge Barnes from the front when in real life, Nichols snuck into the courtroom from the back and shot Barnes from behind. He is also shown killing Deputy Teasley inside the courthouse, when Nichols actually killed Teasley after he ran outside. Also, Nichols shot Teasley five times, while in the movie, he shoots him only twice.

Nichols took four hostages before the killings but in the film, he doesn't take any hostages aside from Smith.
