= Kay Warren (author) =

American author and Bible teacher

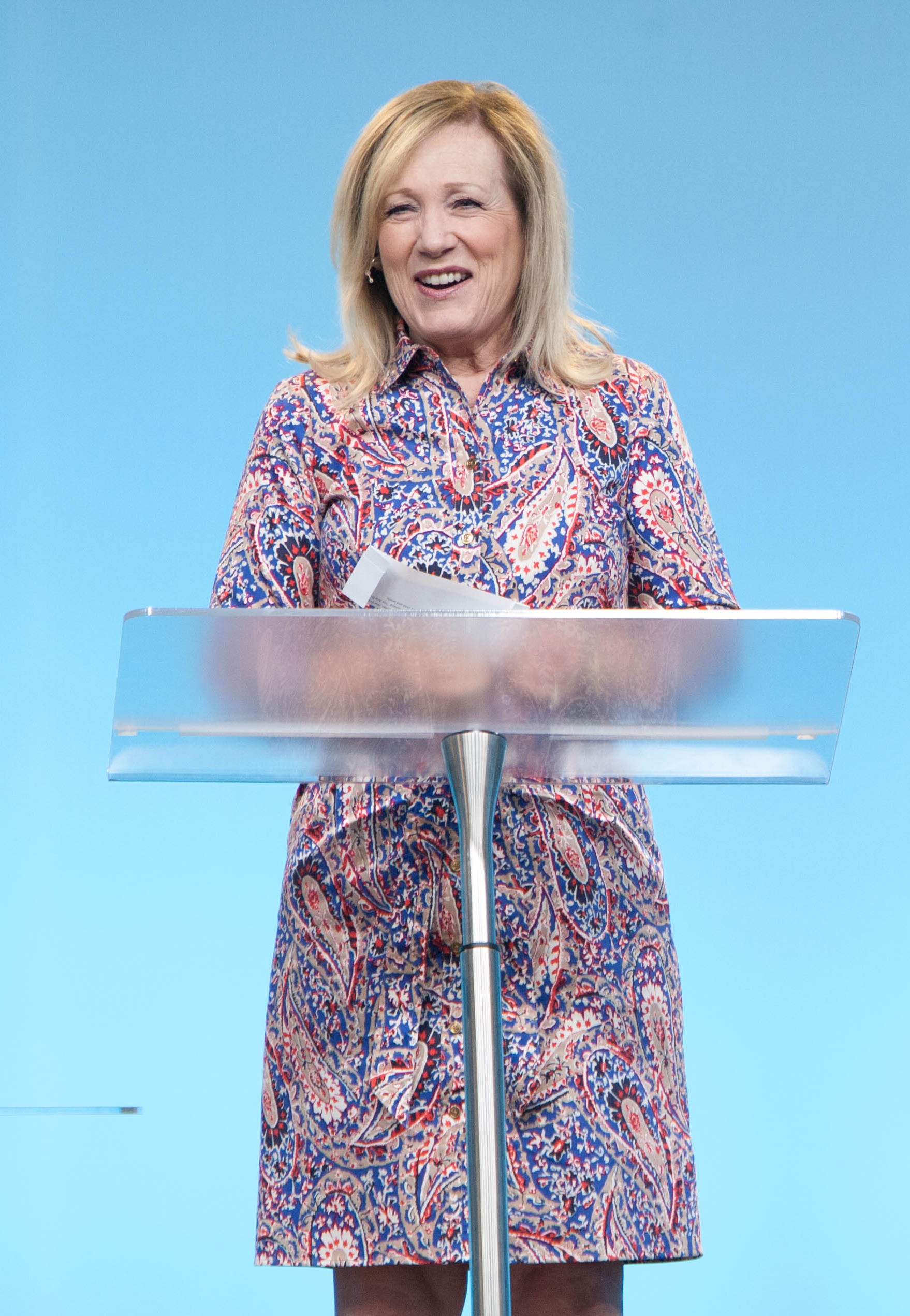
- Kay Warren speaking in 2015.
- Born: Elizabeth Kay Lewis; February 9, 1954 (age 72); San Diego, California, U.S.
- Occupations: Author and speaker
- Years active: 1980–present
- Spouse: Rick Warren (m. 1975)
- Children: 3
- Website: kaywarren.com

Kay Warren (born Elizabeth Kay Lewis; February 9, 1954) is an American author, international speaker, Bible teacher and mental health advocate. She is the co-founder of the sixth-largest evangelical megachurch in the United States, Saddleback Church. Her ministry is headquartered in Lake Forest, California.

== Personal life ==
Warren was born in San Diego, California, to Reverend B. LaVern and Bobbie Lewis. She attended California Baptist College in Riverside, California, and earned a Bachelor of Arts degree from California State University, Los Angeles in 1976.

Warren married Rick Warren on June 21, 1975, and has three children.

== Ministry ==
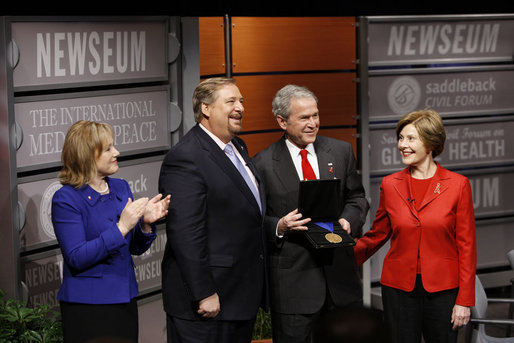
Warren and Rick Warren (left of picture), President George W. Bush, with Laura Bush at his side, with the International Medal of Peace at the Saddleback Civil Forum on Global Health in Washington, D.C.

Saddleback Church launched with seven people as a Bible study group in 1980. During that same year, the first service took place in a high school gymnasium on Easter Sunday. In 2017 the church attendance was 22,000 people.

In 2004, Warren founded both the HIV/AIDS and orphan care initiatives at Saddleback Church. Through global summits about HIV/AIDS and civil forums held at the church, Warren and her husband promoted HIV prevention, treatment and care, as well as advocating for orphaned children. Warren became an advocate for people living with mental illness and suicide prevention when her son, Matthew, took his life in 2013. Warren founded the Hope for Mental Health Initiative at Saddleback Church in 2014 and serves as an executive committee board member for the National Action Alliance for Suicide Prevention.

=== Selected bibliography ===
- Say Yes to God: A Call to Courageous Surrender. 2010. ISBN 978-0310328360.
- Choose Joy: Because Happiness Isn't Enough. 2012. ISBN 978-0800722135.
- Sacred Privilege: Your Life and Ministry as a Pastor's Wife. 2017. ISBN 978-0800729677.
