= Robert Clinton =

Robert Clinton may refer to:

- Robert Clinton (British lawyer) (born 1948)
- Robert N. Clinton, American lawyer and judge
- Lord Robert Clinton (1820–1867), British politician
