= J. S. Grewal =

Indian writer & historian (1927–2022)

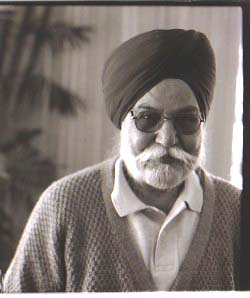
- Jagtar Singh Grewal at UCSB, Goleta, USA, in 2001, by Amarjit Chandan
- Born: 1927; Chak JB 46, Lyallpur, Punjab, British India
- Died: 11 August 2022 (aged 95); Chandigarh, India
- Occupation: Writer, historian, scholar
- Awards: Padma Shri (2005)

Academic work
- Discipline: Sikh history
- Institutions: Guru Nanak Dev University; Panjab University; Indian Institute of Advanced Study; Institute of Punjab Studies

Jagtar Singh Grewal (1927 – 11 August 2022) was an Indian writer, historian, and scholar, who served as the vice-chancellor of Guru Nanak Dev University (GNDU) and as the director of the Indian Institute of Advanced Studies in Shimla. He belonged to one of the first generations of scholars who established Sikh Studies as its own field. Grewal authored forty single-authored volumes, eight joint-authored volumes, seventeen edited volumes, and many journal articles and chapters in collected volumes.

== Early life ==
Grewal was born in Lyallpur (now Faisalabad, Pakistan) in the Punjab Canal Colonies in 1927 as the youngest child amongst five siblings. After studying Persian and Urdu, he enrolled into the Forman Christian College to study physics and mathematics. However, while he was a student there, the partition of Punjab occurred, thus his studies could not be completed, as his family shifted to near Ludhiana in eastern Punjab, which became part of the Republic of India whilst his homeland became part of western Punjab in Pakistan. In India, he completed his undergraduate and postgraduate studies at Government College, Ludhiana and worked in the civil service as a trainee for a while in the audit and accounts department.

== Career ==
Jagtar, who had been a trainee in the civil service, decided to enroll into Government College in Hoshiarpur to study history, but he was persuaded to move to the United Kingdom to continue his studies there. He was admitted to the University of Durham and did his PhD at the School of Oriental and African Studies, University of London. His initial research on British historiography on medieval India would be published as Muslim Rule in India: The Assessments of British Historians (OUP, 1970). Grewal was awarded a D. Litt by Soas in 1970 for his book Guru Nanak in History. The same year, while at Soas, Grewal was invited by A. C. Joshi, the Vice-Chancellor of Panjab University, Chandigarh to work as a lecturer there. After seven years at Panjab University, Grewal shifted to Guru Nanak Dev University (GNDU), where he became one of the founding members of its Department of History.

After securing his Ph.D. and DLitt from London, he joined the GNDU, where he founded the Department of History. After becoming a Dean of Academic Affairs at GNDU, he was the first Dean of the Academic Affairs (from 1981–1984) of the University and was a former member of faculty at the Panjab University, Chandigarh. After his superannuation from GNDU in 1984, he joined the Indian Institute of Advanced Study as its director. In 1988, he retired from GNDU and became a Visiting Fellow at the Indian Institute of Advanced Studies. He served as the director of the institution from 1989–1993.

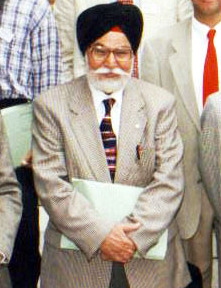
Grewal in 1998

Grewal was a member of the Religious Advisory Council of the Tony Blair Faith Foundation and the head of the Institute of Punjab Studies, Chandigarh. He had published several articles and books on Sikh history and is considered by many as a scholar on the subject. Contesting Interpretations of the Sikh Tradition, The Sikhs of the Punjab, Sikh Ideology, Polity and Social Order, Social and Cultural History of the Punjab, Maharja Ranjit Singh: Polity, Economy and Society, Kinship and State Formation, The Sikhs: Ideology, Institutions, and Identity, Guru Nanak in History and Historical Writings on the Sikhs (1784–2011) are some of his notable works and his researches have been subjected to studies on academic level. The Government of India awarded him the fourth highest civilian honour of the Padma Shri, in 2005, for his contributions to Indian literature.

== Death ==
Grewal died on 11 August 2022 at the age of 95.

== Bibliography ==
- Goswamy, B. N.; Grewal, Jagtar Singh (1967). The Mughals and the Jogis of Jakhbar. Shimla: Indian Institute of Advanced Study.
- J. S. Grewal (1969). Guru Nanak in History. Punjab University Press.
- J. S. Grewal (1998). Contesting Interpretations of the Sikh Tradition. Manohar Publishers. p. 315. ISBN 9788173042553.
- J. S. Grewal (1998). The Sikhs of the Punjab. The New Cambridge History of India. Cambridge University Press. pp. 308. ISBN 9780521637640.
- J. S. Grewal (2001). Maharja Ranjit Singh: Polity, Economy and Society. Guru Nanak Dev University. p. 112. ISBN 9788177700268.
- J. S. Grewal (2004). Social and Cultural History of the Punjab. Manohar Publishers. p. 185. ISBN 9788173045653.
- J. S. Grewal (2007). Sikh Ideology, Polity and Social Order. Manohar Publishers. p. 303. ISBN 9788173047374.
- J. S. Grewal, Veena Sachdeva (2007). Kinship and State Formation. Manohar Publishers. p. 112. ISBN 9788173047183.
- J. S. Grewal (2009). The Sikhs: Ideology, Institutions, and Identity. Oxford University Press India. p. 400. ISBN 9780195694949.
- J. S. Grewal (2012). Historical Writings on the Sikhs (1784-2011). SAB. ASIN B00A3K71R2.

== Awards ==
- Padma Shri (2005)
- Professor of Eminence by the University of Patiala (2010–2016)

== See also ==
- Guru Nanak Dev University
- Tony Blair Faith Foundation
