= Brian Nichols =

American mass murderer (born 1971)

- Mugshot of Nichols taken in 2020
- Born: Brian Gene Nichols; December 10, 1971 (age 54); Baltimore, Maryland, U.S.
- Status: Incarcerated
- Criminal charges: Murder, kidnapping, robbery, aggravated assault on a police officer, battery, theft, carjacking, rape and escape
- Penalty: Life imprisonment

Details
- Killed: 4
- Injured: 1
- Weapon: .40 caliber Glock

Brian Gene Nichols (born December 10, 1971) is an American former college football player known for the March 11, 2005 Fulton County Courthouse shootings and subsequent escape in Atlanta, Georgia. At the time of the courthouse shootings, Nichols was being retried on rape and other charges after his first trial ended in a mistrial when the jury was unable to reach a verdict. Following his escape from custody, a large-scale manhunt was launched throughout the Atlanta metropolitan area, and Nichols was taken into custody approximately 26 hours later. In 2008, Nichols was tried on 54 charges arising from the courthouse shootings, escape, and related events. He was found guilty on all 54 counts on November 7, 2008, including murder, felony murder, aggravated assault, armed robbery, kidnapping, hijacking a motor vehicle, and escape, and was subsequently sentenced to life imprisonment without the possibility of parole.

== Early life ==
Nichols grew up in a middle-class household in Baltimore, Maryland, and attended Cardinal Gibbons School.

He later attended Kutztown University of Pennsylvania in Kutztown, Pennsylvania, from 1989 to 1990, where he played football and was known for having a "knack for trouble". Nichols dropped out of college and moved to Georgia in 1995, where he worked for Hewlett-Packard and UPS.

Nichols was arrested on multiple charges for the rape, kidnapping, and assault of a former girlfriend after discovering that she was dating a minister from the church that they both attended. The first attempt at a trial ended with a mistrial and a hung jury. While awaiting a second trial, friends and family members of Nichols expressed concern that he would attempt to escape, having tried to formulate an escape plan with a friend.

== Shootings and escape ==
On March 11, 2005, Nichols overpowered Sheriff's Deputy Cynthia Hall while changing clothes at the Fulton County Courthouse. He stole her Glock service pistol and beat her into a coma. Nichols had previously attempted to sneak "shanks" into the courtroom via his shoes. Nichols changed into civilian clothes originally intended for use during the trial.

Nichols encountered case managers Susan Christy and Gina Clarke Thomas and attorney David Allman, whom he held at gunpoint and demanded lead him to Barnes's chambers. Sergeant Grantley White attempted to disarm Nichols but failed and was forced to handcuff the others. White set off an alarm which Nichols attempted to dispel using White's radio. Nichols progressed into the courtroom where he fatally shot Barnes and court reporter Julie Ann Brandau. He fatally shot Sergeant Hoyt Teasley while escaping the courthouse. Nichols stole several vehicles during his escape and was featured on America's Most Wanted during his manhunt.

A reward of $65,000 was announced for anyone who gave information leading to Nichols's arrest. Nichols attempted to kidnap a young woman as she was walking home from a gymnasium. He fled after her boyfriend defended her and he heard her call 9-1-1. Later that day, Nichols fatally shot ICE Special Agent David G. Wilhelm and stole his badge, gun, and pickup truck.

== Capture ==
Police received a 9-1-1 call from Ashley Smith, a young woman who said Nichols was at her Duluth, Georgia, apartment. Law enforcement responded and Nichols surrendered. Authorities recovered several stolen firearms and Special Agent Wilhelm's wallet. The stolen truck was discovered about two miles from the apartment. Smith told police Nichols had forced his way into her apartment on March 12, and held her hostage at gunpoint for seven hours. She gave Nichols methamphetamine and read portions of The Purpose Driven Life to him. She tried convincing Nichols to turn himself in by telling him about her husband's death, and showing him a scar she got in a car wreck while under the influence of drugs. After she made him pancakes for breakfast, Nichols allowed Smith to leave to see her daughter, whereupon she called police. Smith received reward money for her assistance in Nichols's capture.

Nichols was taken to a Federal Bureau of Investigation field office in Decatur, Georgia, and then to an Atlanta Police Station, where he confessed on video and detailed his crimes.

== Indictment and trial ==
On May 5, 2005, Nichols was indicted by a Fulton County grand jury on 54 counts, including murder, felony murder, kidnapping, armed robbery, aggravated assault, aggravated battery, theft, carjacking, and escape from authorities. Nichols initially pleaded not guilty, with his lawyers stating that they wanted to defend Nichols on the basis of mental health. Fulton County District Attorney Paul Howard announced he would seek the death penalty. Nichols became Georgia's most expensive defendant, with his case topping $3 million for the prosecution and defense combined.

The case was presided over by Superior Court Judge Hilton Fuller and was set to take place in July in the same courtroom in which the murders had taken place. The trial was placed on hold to find new accommodation, as Superior Court Judge James Bodiford ruled that "fundamental fairness" made a different location necessary. While awaiting trial Nichols was found to be planning another escape, and was moved to DeKalb County Jail in October 2006. The trial began on September 22, 2008, in Atlanta Municipal Court, where Nichols pleaded not guilty by reason of insanity.

During the trial the prosecution sought to discredit Nichols's claims of mental instability by playing audio recordings of the murders. Witnesses testified that Nichols had not shown signs of mental illness during his rape trial.

Nichols admitted the shootings in a statement to police, but claimed the shooting of Wilhelm was due to the special agent pointing a gun at him. Forensic evidence did not support this, instead showing Wilhelm had been shot while kneeling, and that he had other injuries indicating that he was not holding a gun.

== Defense ==
Nichols's defense argued that he was insane and should not be held accountable for his actions, stating that he had previously shown signs of depression and suicidal ideations after breaking up with his girlfriend. An attorney who represented Nichols in his rape trial testified that Nichols had believed his ex-girlfriend still loved him despite receiving injuries from the rape, and would not testify against him. Psychology experts testified that Nichols had an abusive childhood and that his father's drug abuse led to Nichols abusing drugs as well. The defense provided college papers written by Nichols expressing conspiracy theories that white people were conspiring to eradicate the black race.

== Conviction and sentencing ==
The jury deliberated for twelve hours, over two days, before finding Nichols guilty of all 54 counts, on November 7, 2008.

On December 13, 2008, Nichols was sentenced to multiple life sentences with no chance of parole. Bodiford handed down the maximum sentence on each of the charges, to run consecutively. Nichols was spared multiple death sentences when the jury failed to reach a unanimous decision, as required by Georgia law, to recommend the death penalty. Bodiford said, "If there was any more I could give you, I would." Nichols is incarcerated in Georgia Diagnostic and Classification State Prison.

== Civil lawsuits ==
Some family members of the victims filed civil lawsuits against Fulton County. Judge Barnes's widow won a $5.2 million lawsuit. County commissioners agreed to pay $5 million to Julie Ann Brandau's daughter, Christina Scholte, who also sued.

== In popular culture ==
Ashley Smith wrote a book about her ordeal with Nichols titled Unlikely Angel: The Untold Story of the Atlanta Hostage Hero. The book was adapted into the film Captive in 2015, starring David Oyelowo as Nichols.

== See also ==
- Floyd Allen
