= Robert Coke (investor) =

Businessperson

Robert Coke (Robert Henry D'Ewes Coke) is a senior investment officer at the Wellcome Trust, Chairman of the British Private Equity and Venture Capital Association's Advisory Board (BVCA's LPAB) and chairman of the Private Equity Investors Association (PEIA). He is also one of the trustees of the Tony Blair Faith Foundation.
