= Ismail Khudr Al-Shatti =

Ismail Khudr Al-Shatti (إسماعيل خضر خلف الشطي, born 1949) is among the prominent personalities in Kuwaiti and Gulf Cooperation Council (GCC) politics. He currently serves as the head of advisory committee for the Kuwaiti prime minister. He is a former Kuwaiti Ministry of Communications and a former Kuwaiti deputy prime minister

Prior to current rule, Al-Shatti held several administrative positions within the Kuwaiti government. He has served as an advisor to think tanks specializing in futures studies and scientific decision-making processes at national and international levels.

Al-Shatti earned a Chemical Engineering bachelor's degree, continuing with a masters in Industrial Engineering and a PhD in Civil Engineering (from University of Southampton, UK). He worked as Dean of Faculty of Technological Studies and published many scientific papers in Chemical Engineering and Future Researche. Al-Shatti has also been a noted journalist and a columnist in local and Arabic newspapers and magazines such as Al-Watan, Al-Qabas, Asharq Al-Awsat, Al-Hayat, and Al Kuwait magazine. He was editor in chief of the magazine Al Mujtama’a for 12 years.

Al-Shatti was the CEO of Dar Al Mashora for Consulting Services and Gulf Institute for Futures and Strategic Studies. He has a lifetime membership of the World Futures Society, has been the Arab Regional Coordinator of World Futures Society since 1989, is member of Millennium Project of the American Council for the United Nations University and was a Planning Committee Member and Chairman of Gulf Node.

As of 2014, Al-Shatti holds membership of International Religious Advisory Council of the Tony Blair Faith Foundation. In April 2014, he was an adviser to the Kuwaiti government and a member of Blair’s advisory council. According to The Daily Telegraph, the Global Muslim Brotherhood Daily Watch revealed that Al-Shatti was a leading member of the Islamic Constitutional Movement (ICM), considered the Kuwaiti branch of the Muslim Brotherhood.
