= The Purpose Driven Church =

Book by Rick Warren

- Cover
- Author: Rick Warren
- Language: English
- Subject: Bible study
- Publisher: Zondervan
- Publication date: 1995
- Publication place: United States
- Media type: Print

The Purpose Driven Church: Growth Without Compromising Your Message & Mission is a 1995 book by Rick Warren, founder and senior pastor of Saddleback Church in Lake Forest, California, United States.

== Summary ==
The book is targeted to pastors and church leaders and advises them to base their ministry on God's purposes, not their own ideas of ministry, hence the term "Purpose Driven". Warren suggests that these purposes are worship, fellowship, discipleship, ministry, and mission, and that they are derived from the Great Commandment (Matthew 22:37–40) and the Great Commission (Matthew 28:19–20).

Warren writes that every church is driven by something. Tradition, finances, programs, personalities, events, seekers and even buildings can each be the controlling force in a church. But he believes that in order for a church to be healthy it must be built around the five New Testament purposes given to the church by Jesus. "The issue is church health, not church growth!" declares Warren. "If your church is healthy, growth will occur naturally. Healthy, consistent growth is the result of balancing the five biblical purposes of the church."

He proposes that church leaders ask of themselves, "What is our purpose?", "Why do we do what we do?", "What should we be doing?", and "How will you do that?" In this book Warren provides a guide to answer these questions on how to do church. He further suggests that following the principles he outlines in the book will enable a church to grow.

The author emphasizes an intentional people-building process. He says, "If you will concentrate on building people, God will build the church."

The teaching of The Purpose Driven Church was derived from Warren's own experience in leading Saddleback Church from its founding in 1980 to over 10,000 in worship attendance in its first fifteen years, becoming one of the fastest growing churches in America during this time.

== Reception ==
The book was a bestseller a few weeks after its publication. The Purpose Driven Church has been translated into over 30 languages, including Spanish, Portuguese, French, and German. It is listed in 100 Christian Books That Changed the Century and has been given many awards. For example, in 1996 and 1997, the book was the Evangelical Christian Publishers Association (ECPA) Christian Book Award Winner for the US. In 2002, the ECPA awarded it the Gold Medallion Award. The book and its author have received numerous reviews in the mainstream press and have been the subject of much support and criticism in Christian blogs and newsletters.

In a May 2005 survey of American pastors and ministers conducted by George Barna, it was voted as the second book most influential on their lives and ministries, behind The Purpose Driven Life, a subsequent book by Warren.

== Influence ==
The book was the origin of the annual conferences called "Purpose Driven Conference".
