= P.E.A.C.E. Plan =

The P E A C E Plan is a humanitarian development program for churches and an evangelical Christian mission from Saddleback Church in Lake Forest in California in the United States.

== History ==
The P.E.A.C.E. Plan has origins in the reading of an article on orphans of HIV/AIDS in Africa by Kay, the wife of Baptist pastor Rick Warren and a meeting in 2003 of the couple with a pastor of a township of Johannesburg in South Africa. The program was founded in the same year by the Saddleback Church and Warren to combat five development challenges. For 18 months, pilot programs were tested with twinning of villages with small church groups. In 2005, the program was established in Rwanda which was the first permanent partner.

In 2008, after listening to comments from church leaders in various countries on the effectiveness of the program, Rick Warren made several corrections to the program, including the addition of the church reconciliation component.

== Programs ==
The five challenges of the program are:

1. spiritual emptiness;
2. egocentric leadership;
3. extreme poverty;
4. pandemic diseases;
5. illiteracy and lack of education.

The five objectives of the program are:

1. Plant or support churches for reconciliation: Support or plant churches by providing resources to combat racism and injustice.
2. Equip church leaders: Provide leadership training.
3. Assisting the poor: Support savings groups, business projects, and orphans.
4. Caring for the sick: Support access to clean water, sanitation, mental health care, people living with HIV/AIDS.
5. Educate the next generation: Support literacy programs in English.

In the fight against poverty in Africa, the program prioritizes the maintenance of contact of AIDS orphans with their communities by entrusting them to host families and avoids building orphanages.

== Critics ==
In 2009, a study by the National University of Rwanda noted that the health component of the program, in Karongi District in Rwanda, had certain weaknesses, including the lack of cooperation between the churches of different names, lack of staff to manage outcome evaluation data, and reluctance to collaborate with secular groups (governments, NGOs, universities).

== See also ==
- The Purpose Driven Church
