= Robert Clinton (British lawyer) =

Robert George Clinton, CVO, is a noted British lawyer. He was a senior partner with Farrer & Co, the solicitors between 2002 and 2008, and continues to act as one of their consultants. His main areas of expertise include reputation and issue management for individuals, institutions and corporates. In the 2008 Birthday Honours Clinton was appointed Commander of the Royal Victorian Order (CVO). He also acts as a trustee to the Tony Blair Faith Foundation, to the Cherie Blair Foundation for Women and as a Director of Early Resolution, a non-profit endeavor offering claimants and defendants a chance to resolve key issues in libel disputes.
