= Civil Forum on the Presidency =

- Hosted by pastor Rick WarrenVenue at Saddleback Worship Center
- Date: August 16, 2008
- Location: Saddleback Church Lake Forest, California
- Participants: John McCain, Barack Obama Presumptive nominees

The Civil Forum on the Presidency was the venue of back-to-back interviews of U.S. presidential candidates John McCain and Barack Obama by pastor Rick Warren on August 16, 2008, at Saddleback Church in Lake Forest, California.

== Format ==
Held inside Saddleback's Worship Center, the event was the first joint appearance of the two presidential candidates during the campaign. It was broadcast live on national news networks, as well as several evangelical Christian networks such as Trinity Broadcasting Network and Daystar Television Network. Tickets for the sold-out event were distributed to church members by raffle for prices as high as $1,000. Both campaigns agreed to the format of the debate—two consecutive interviews—and Senator Obama went first, as determined by a coin toss. The coin toss was conducted by Rick Warren's staff on behalf of McCain and Obama, who were not present. Some groups opposed the forum, including the Americans United for Separation of Church and State.

== Issues ==
The candidates each exposed their positions on a number of issues, including faith, abortion, evil, wealth, same-sex marriage, and stem-cell research. The two struck common themes, but differed on their views of abortion; Obama said the answer was "above his pay grade" a comment he later regretted and also told Warren the issue "scientifically" and "theologically" is not a black and white one in defining the precise moment when a baby gets human rights. McCain answered, "At the moment of conception." Asked about their greatest moral failures, Obama cited his adolescent drug use while McCain said his was failing his first marriage. Obama and McCain gave different answers on which justices they would have refused to nominate to the United States Supreme Court, McCain saying Ruth Bader Ginsburg, John Paul Stevens, Stephen Breyer and David Souter, and Obama saying Clarence Thomas and Antonin Scalia. The presumptive nominees presented contrasting views on the definition of rich; Warren asked, "At what point...do you move from middle class to rich?" Obama answered that rich Americans make more than $250,000, while McCain answered, "How about $5 million?" When asked an issue on which they had changed their view in the last ten years, Obama said welfare reform and McCain said energy. Both candidates were alleged to have made misleading claims and exaggerations during the forum.

== Alleged cheating ==
Because the questions posed to the two candidates in their separate appearances would be the same or similar, it was agreed in advance that whichever candidate went second would be sequestered so as not to hear anything asked of his rival. At the beginning of the forum, Warren stated, "Now, Senator Obama is going to go first. We flipped a coin, and we have safely placed Senator McCain in a cone of silence." In fact, however, McCain did not even arrive at the church until nearly half an hour later. Andrea Mitchell, on Meet the Press, alluded to the possibility that McCain may have been able to hear the questions put to Obama, partly because his answers were immediate and, according to Mitchell, he sounded well prepared. Another act that aroused suspicion was when McCain was asked to define marriage— he gave a straightforward answer, and then asked when he would be asked the importance of Supreme Court Justices, even though the question was not to be asked until later. The McCain campaign stated that McCain did not hear or see any of the broadcast. A spokeswoman for McCain said, "The insinuation from the Obama campaign that John McCain, a former prisoner of war, cheated is outrageous." ABC News has reported that, in subsequent inquiries about the incident, the McCain campaign, while continuing to insist that McCain did not hear or see the broadcast himself, "has so far refused to say no one told the senator about the questions Obama was asked."
