= Saddleback Church =

- Saddleback Valley Community Church
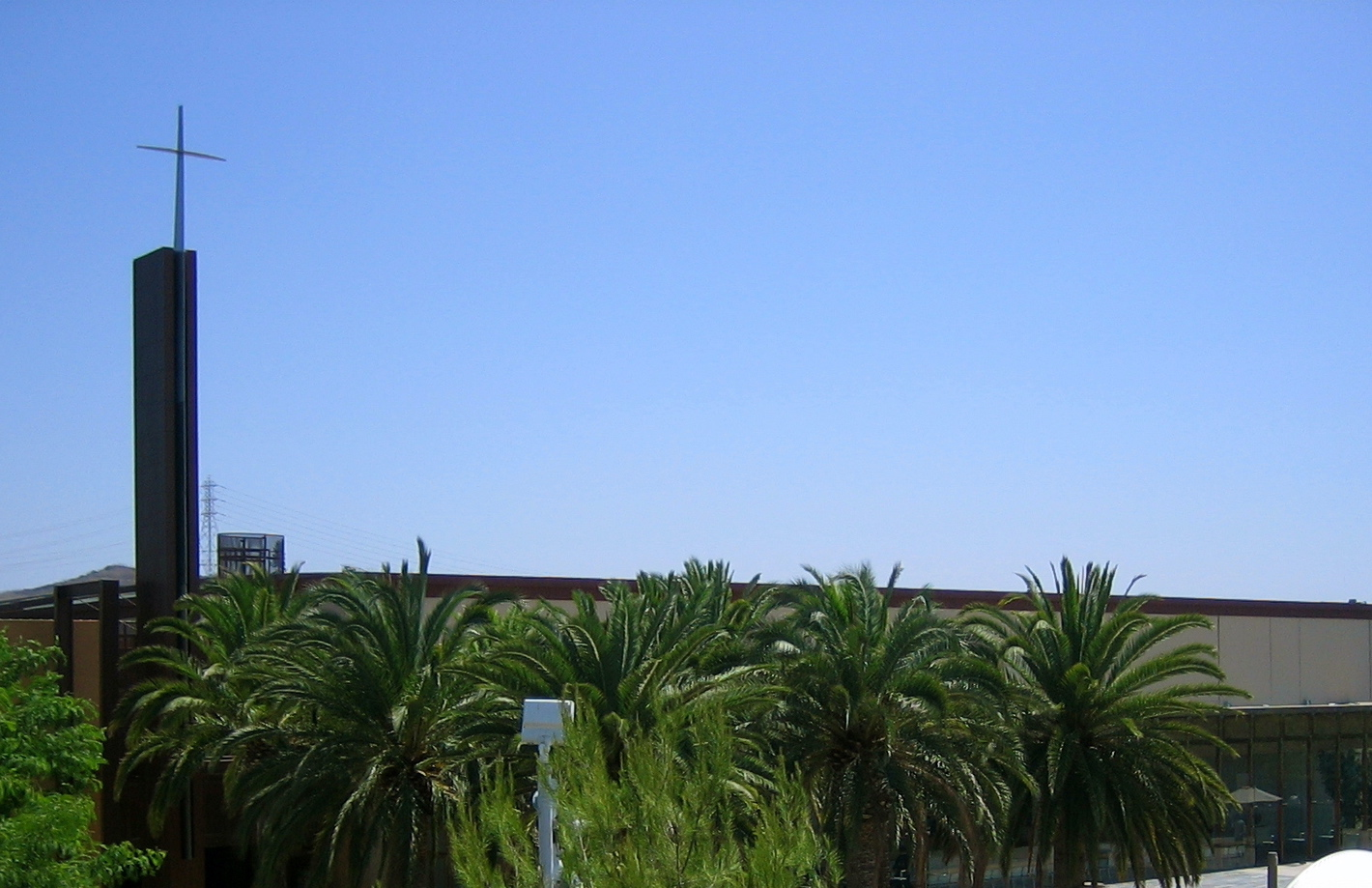
- Saddleback Church, Lake Forest, worship center
- Saddleback Church
- Location: Lake Forest, California, across Los Angeles metro area, other locations across the world
- Country: United States
- Denomination: Baptist
- Website: www.saddleback.com

History
- Founded: 1980
- Founder(s): Rick Warren, Kay Warren

Architecture
- Style: Contemporary/Modern
- Years built: 1985

Saddleback Church is an evangelical, non-denominational Christian multi-site megachurch based in Lake Forest, California. It is the largest church in California, and one of the largest in the United States of America. The church has several campuses in California and around the world, as well as a number of extensions. Weekly church attendance was 30,000 people in 2024. Its senior pastor is Andy Wood, and his wife, Stacie Wood, is a teaching pastor. Saddleback was formerly associated with the Southern Baptist Convention, until 2023.

== History ==
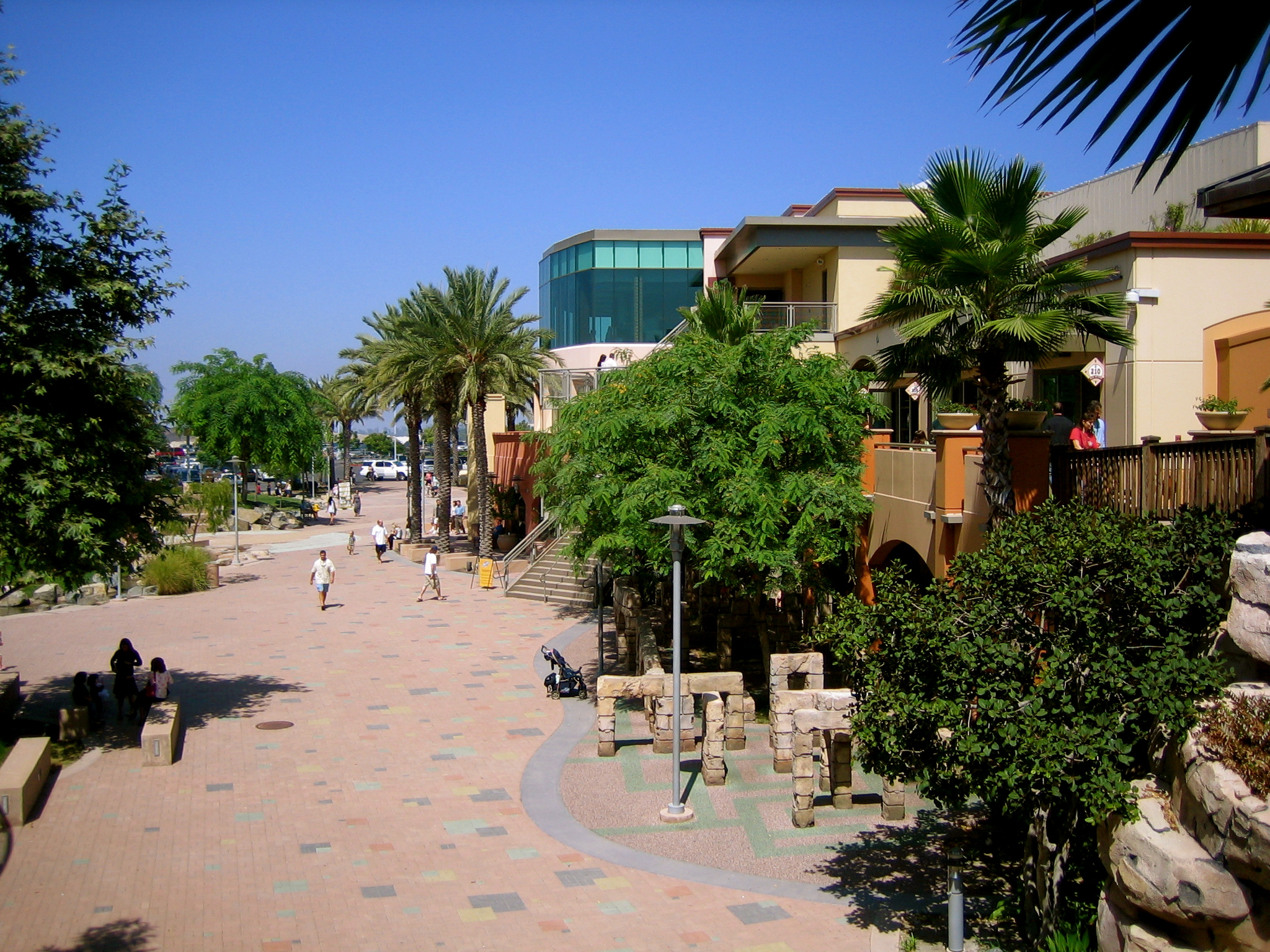
Saddleback Church Children's Building in Lake Forest, California.

In 1979, Rick Warren, recently graduated in theology, settled with his wife Kay in the Saddleback Valley area of Orange County, California. He began to probe the people in his neighborhood to find out what prevented them from coming to church. The answers that emerged were boredom, distance from everyday life, lack of welcome for visitors, insistence on money and inadequate programs for children. It is with these concerns that the church began in 1980, with a Bible study group, with six people, the pastor Rick Warren and his wife, in their condo. The first worship service took place in the "Little Theatre" of Laguna Hills High School on Palm Sunday, in 1980. In 1995, it dedicated a new building in Lake Forest including a 3,500-seat auditorium.

In 2003, Saddleback Church, Kay and Rick Warren founded the P.E.A.C.E. Plan, a humanitarian development program for churches.

In November and December 2006, Saddleback Church played host to the second annual Global Summit on AIDS and the Church. The summit featured 60 speakers, including Senators Barack Obama and Sam Brownback.

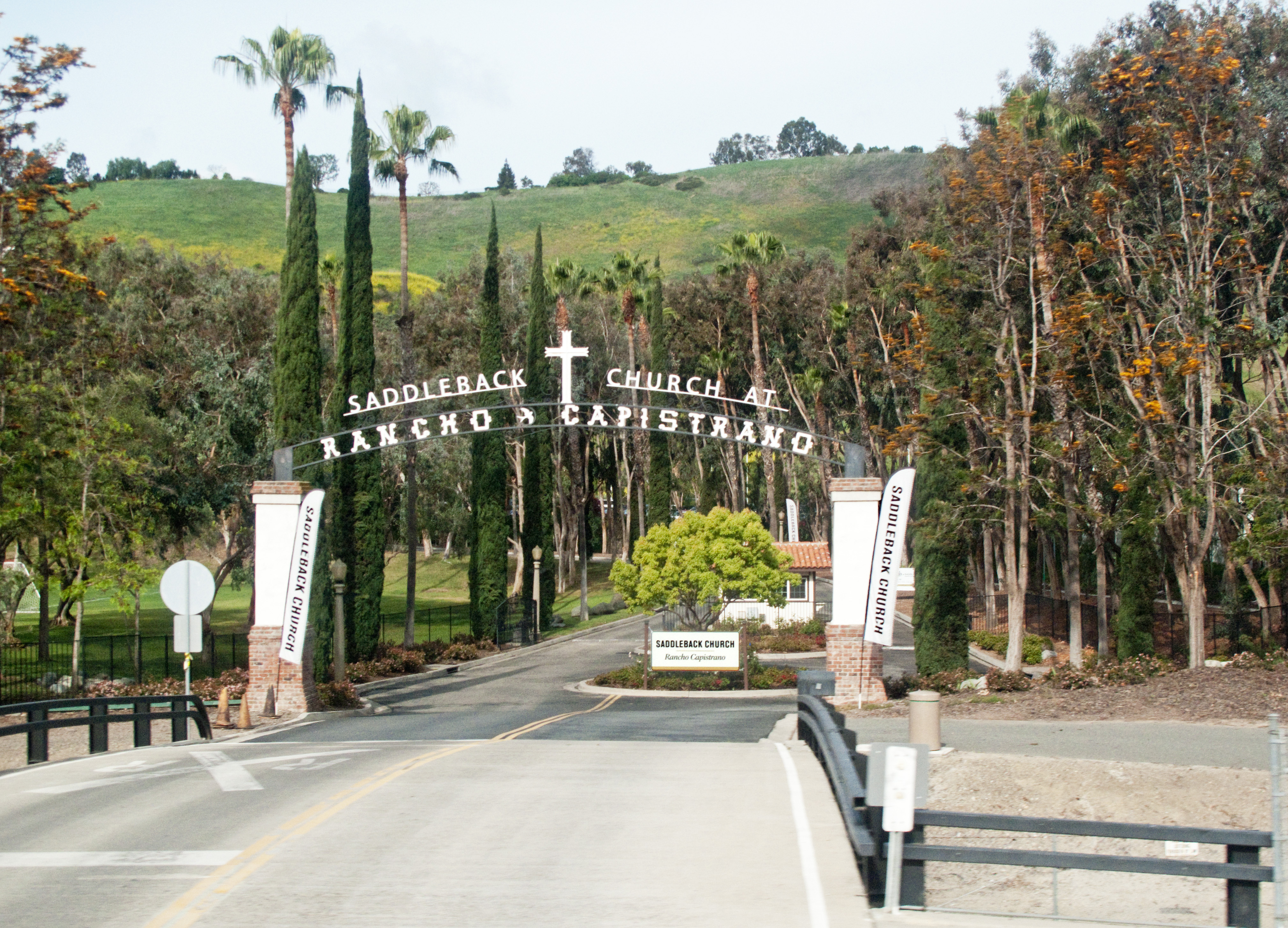
The driveway to Saddleback Church of Rancho Capistrano campus in San Juan Capistrano.

On August 16, 2008, Rick Warren arranged a meeting between Senators John McCain and Barack Obama at Saddleback called the Civil Forum on the Presidency. The format of the forum was structured such that Warren first asked Obama a series of questions; he then asked McCain very similar ones subsequently. It was broadcast live on national news networks and streamed online. Tickets were distributed to the public through a raffle with seats listing as high as $1,000, and the event was sold out.

In 2018, the church said it had baptized 50,000 people since its founding. In November 2018, CBS News listed Saddleback Church as the eleventh largest megachurch in the United States with about 22,055 weekly visitors.

In 2022, Andy Wood became lead pastor.

In 2021, the church was audited for compliance by the Southern Baptist Convention, after ordaining three women pastors that year and thus acting contrary to the Convention's confession of faith (Baptist Faith and Message) which believes that the pastoral ministry is reserved for men. As of February 21, 2023, the church was removed from the SBC membership list due to the hiring of a female pastor in 2022, Stacie Wood, the wife of new senior pastor Andy Wood. On May 16, the Southern Baptist Convention announced that Saddleback was seeking an appeal to be reinstated in fellowship. In June 2023, when it requested a review of the decision, church representatives present at the annual convention voted 88% to uphold this decision. The church wanted to maintain its affiliation with the California Southern Baptist Convention, but in October 2023, it decided to leave the state convention as well, in a desire to avoid divisions.

According to a church census released in 2024, it claimed a weekly attendance of 30,000 people and 15 campuses in different cities.

== Beliefs ==
The church has a Baptist confession of faith.

== Programs ==
The church offers various programs, such as The Purpose Driven Church (PDC) curriculum and Celebrate Recovery, an addiction recovery support group program.

== Church land sale for battery energy storage (BESS) facility ==
In 2024, Saddleback Church drew significant local scrutiny after entering into an agreement to sell a portion of its San Juan Capistrano property for the development of a large-scale battery energy storage (BESS) facility. The proposed installation, to be operated by an energy-infrastructure developer, would place a multi-acre battery-storage site downslope from several residential neighborhoods and in proximity to environmentally sensitive areas connected to Oso Creek.

== See also ==
- P.E.A.C.E. Plan
- Purpose Driven
- List of the largest evangelical churches
- List of the largest evangelical church auditoriums
