= Rick Warren =

Christian religious leader

The Reverend Rick Warren
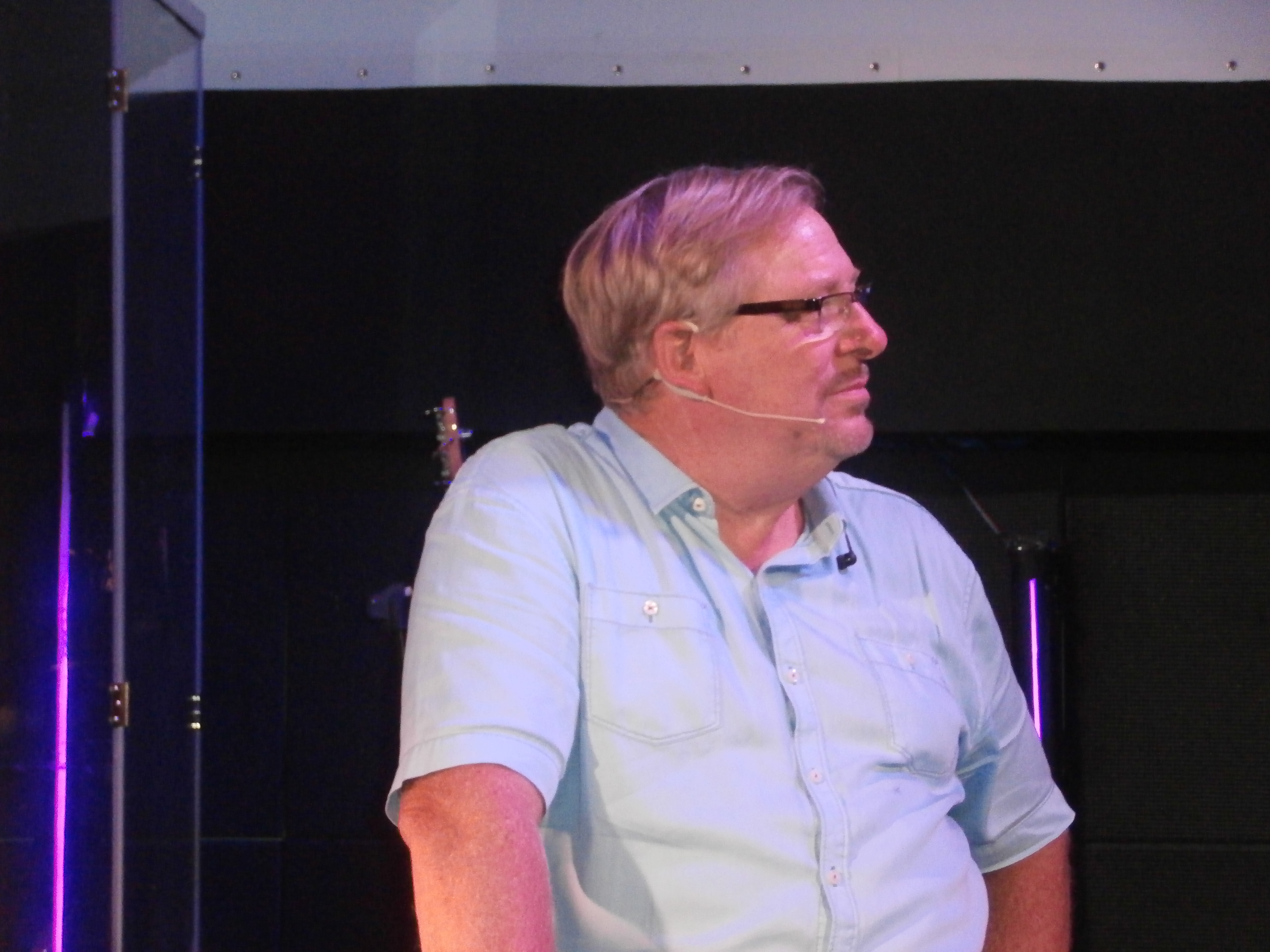
- Warren in 2016
- Church: Saddleback Church

Personal details
- Born: Richard Duane Warren; January 28, 1954 (age 72) San Jose, California, U.S.
- Denomination: Non-denominational
- Spouse: Kay Warren (m. 1975)
- Children: 3
- Occupation: Founding pastor, author, Executive director Finishing The Task
- Education: California Baptist University (Bachelor of Arts); Southwestern Baptist Theological Seminary (Master of Divinity); Fuller Theological Seminary (Doctor of Ministry)

Richard Duane Warren (born January 28, 1954) is an American evangelical Christian pastor and author. He is the founder of Saddleback Church, an evangelical Baptist megachurch in Lake Forest, California. Since 2022, he serves as executive director of the Finishing the Task mission coalition.

Rick Warren was born in San Jose, California, to Jimmy, a Baptist minister, and Dot Warren, a high-school librarian, and was raised in Ukiah, California. Warren earned a Bachelor of Arts from California Baptist University, followed by a Master of Divinity from Southwestern Baptist Theological Seminary in 1979, and later a Doctor of Ministry from Fuller Theological Seminary.

Warren founded Saddleback Church in 1980 in Orange County, California, beginning with a small Bible study group that quickly grew into a large congregation averaging nearly 20,000 attendees weekly. He developed the Purpose Driven philosophy of ministry, emphasizing church growth through five purposes: worship, fellowship, discipleship, ministry, and evangelism. Warren authored The Purpose Driven Church in 1995 and later The Purpose Driven Life, both of which became widely influential, with the latter selling over 30 million copies. He also co-founded the P.E.A.C.E. Plan, a humanitarian initiative for churches, and has spoken at major international forums including the United Nations, the World Economic Forum, and TED.

Throughout his career, Warren has been involved in political and social issues, sometimes drawing controversy. He has publicly opposed same-sex marriage and supported California Proposition 8. He has worked with diverse religious communities and emphasized dialogue. Warren has received numerous recognitions, including Time’s "100 Most Influential People in the World" in 2005, and has been active in humanitarian and mental health initiatives following the death of his son.

== Early life and education ==
Warren was born in San Jose, California, the son of Jimmy and Dot Warren. His father was a Baptist minister; his mother a high-school librarian. He was raised in Ukiah, California, and graduated from Ukiah High School in 1972, where he founded the first Christian club on the school's campus.

He studied at California Baptist University in Riverside, California and earned a Bachelor of Arts degree. He then studied at Southwestern Baptist Theological Seminary in Fort Worth, Texas and earned a Master of Divinity in 1979. He also studied at Fuller Theological Seminary in Pasadena, California and earned a Doctor of Ministry.

== Ministry ==
Warren says he was called to full-time ministry when he was a 19-year-old student at California Baptist University. In November 1973, he and a friend skipped classes and drove 350 miles to hear W. A. Criswell preach at the Jack Tar Hotel in San Francisco. Warren waited afterwards to shake hands with Criswell, who focused on Warren, stating, "I feel led to lay hands on you and pray for you!"

During his time at Southwestern Baptist Theological Seminary, Warren worked at the Texas Ranch for Christ, a ministry facility of Billie Hanks Jr., where he began writing books. He co-wrote two books, The Victory Scripture Memory Series and Twelve Dynamic Bible Study Methods for Laity, with Hanks and Wayne Watts.

In January 1980, Warren began a Bible study group with seven people and his wife at their Saddleback Valley condo in Orange County, California. In April 1980, Warren held Saddleback Church's first public service on Easter Sunday at the Laguna Hills High School Theater with 200 people in attendance. Warren's church growth methods led to rapid expansion, with the church using nearly 80 different facilities in its 35-year history. The church averages nearly 20,000 people in attendance each week.

In 2005, during the Centenary Congress of the Baptist World Alliance, he affirmed that the withdrawal of the Southern Baptist Convention from the Alliance was a mistake since theological differences should not prevent fellowship with other churches.

Warren has been invited to speak at national and international forums, including the United Nations, the World Economic Forum in Davos, the African Union, the Council on Foreign Relations, Harvard Kennedy School, TED, and Time's Global Health Summit. He has been a member of the Council on Foreign Relations (CFR) since 2005.

In August 2008, Warren drew greater national attention by hosting the Civil Forum on the Presidency, featuring senators John McCain and Barack Obama at Saddleback Church. The forum marked McCain and Obama's first joint appearance as the presumptive Republican and Democratic presidential nominees and was broadcast live on national television.

In December 2008, President-elect Obama chose Warren to give the invocation at his inauguration ceremony. The decision angered pro-choice and LGBT advocates and led to criticism of both Obama and Warren. Obama defended his choice of Warren, saying that although he disagreed with the minister's positions on abortion and same-sex marriage, there should be room for dialogue on such difficult social issues. More controversy ensued when it was announced that Warren would be the keynote speaker at the Martin Luther King, Jr. Annual Commemorative Service on January 19, 2009, the day prior to the inauguration. He delivered the invocation at Obama's inauguration the next day, which was generally praised for its positive message.

In January 2009, Warren and the Reader's Digest Association partnered in the launch of the Purpose Driven Connection, a quarterly publication sold as part of a bundle of multimedia products. In November 2009, the partners announced that the magazine had not drawn enough paying members and would cease after publication of the fourth issue that month.

In 2010, Warren was chosen to lead a prayer at the inauguration ceremony of the President of Rwanda, Paul Kagame. Since that date, he has been part of the latter's Presidential Advisory Council.

In June 2021, Warren announced he would be retiring from the senior pastor position at Saddleback, but that he would stay on until his successor is appointed. In January 2022, he became executive director of Finishing the Task, a mission coalition. In August of that year, Warren stepped down as lead pastor while maintaining a founding pastor role.

In May 2023, Warren was installed as the first honorary chancellor of Spurgeon's College. The following month, during the annual Southern Baptist Convention, after Saddleback Church was disfellowshipped from the convention for hiring a female pastor, he championed the ordination of women.

=== Purpose Driven ===
Warren taught the material that would one day become the Purpose Driven philosophy of ministry to individual pastors who called or wrote him in Saddleback's early days.

Warren gained experience teaching the material through his participation in the Institute for Evangelism and Church Growth, affiliated with Fuller Theological Seminary.

In 1995 Zondervan published Warren's best-selling book, The Purpose Driven Church, which distilled many of the lessons he had learned while starting Saddleback Church and honed during years of training other pastors. After sharing the "Saddleback Story", the book makes a case for building a church around five purposes (worship, fellowship, discipleship, ministry, and evangelism) through what Warren called a "crowd to core" method of church growth. He encouraged churches to reach their community, bring in a crowd, turn attendees into members, develop those members to maturity, turn them into ministers, and send them out on a mission.

In 2004, more than 10,000 churches of various denominations attended a seminar or a conference led by Warren.

=== P.E.A.C.E. Plan ===
In 2003, Saddleback Church, Kay and Rick Warren founded the P.E.A.C.E. Plan, a humanitarian development program for churches.

== Recognition ==
In 2004, Warren was named one of the "leaders who mattered most in 2004" by Time. In April 2005, Warren was named by Time as one of the "100 Most Influential People in the World". Warren was named one of "America's Top 25 Leaders" in October 2005, by U.S. News & World Report. In 2006, Warren was named by Newsweek one of "15 People Who Make America Great".

In 2006, The Purpose Driven Life sold more than 30 million copies, making Warren a New York Times bestselling author.

== Personal life ==
Warren has been married to Kay Warren since June 21, 1975. They have three adult children and four grandchildren. He considers Billy Graham, Peter Drucker, and his own father to be among his mentors.

In 2006, after the success of his book The Purpose Driven Life, he claimed to have made the decision to "reverse the tithe", donating 90% of his income to three foundations and no longer receive a salary from the church.

Warren's youngest son, Matthew, died by suicide on April 6, 2013, after 10 years of struggling with mental illness since childhood. He says that, after the event, more than 10,000 people wrote to him about their own struggles within the church. In March 2014, Warren launched a ministry to educate Saddleback on its role to help people struggling with mental illness at The Gathering on Mental Health and the Church.

According to Axios, Warren is a member of Dialog, a secret society founded by Peter Thiel and Auren Hoffman.

== Political and social views ==
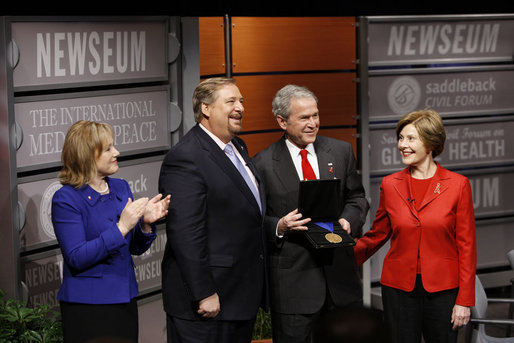
Kay and Rick Warren (left of picture), President George W. Bush, with Laura Bush at his side, with the International Medal of Peace at the Saddleback Civil Forum on Global Health in Washington, D.C.

The combination of Warren's tone on political issues central to U.S. evangelicals and his concern for social issues has resulted in the characterization of Warren as one of a "new breed of evangelical leaders." Warren strongly denies this has been an indication of a shift in position on traditional evangelical issues, as some in the media have reported.

In a conversation with atheist author Sam Harris in Newsweek magazine, Warren spoke out against evolution and in favor of creationism. He also said, when questioned on whether religion is beneficial to society, that brutal dictators such as Mao Zedong, Joseph Stalin, and Pol Pot were all atheists.

In a 2005 Larry King Live interview, during the Terri Schiavo controversy, Warren stated that withholding feeding to Schiavo, a woman in a persistent vegetative state, was "not a right-to-die issue." He elaborated on his concerns over the decision to remove her feeding tube: "I fear the day, that if we start saying, well, you don't have a right to live if you are mentally handicapped or you're physically handicapped or emotionally handicapped...we're just not going to feed you anymore. To me, that is an atrocity worthy of Nazism."

On Hardball with Chris Matthews, after repeated questioning over why Michael Schiavo would want his wife's feeding tube removed, Warren responded, "I have no idea. Well, I don't know. There's a thousand reasons you could speculate. What if she came back out of the—out of this state and had something to say that he didn't want said?".

Two weeks before the 2008 U.S. general election, Warren issued a statement to his congregation endorsing California Proposition 8, which would amend the California Constitution to eliminate the right of same-sex couples to marry, a position consistent with the official position of his church's denomination, the Southern Baptist Convention. After the measure passed, Warren's church and others were targeted by protesters.

In an interview with Beliefnet in early December 2008, Warren again sparked controversy by appearing to equate same-sex marriages with marriages between siblings, marriages between multiple partners, and marriages between adults and minors. He later released a video message explaining that he does not equate gay relationships with incest or pedophilia, but that he opposes the redefinition of marriage. When Chelsea Clinton asked him about his views on same-sex marriage in December 2012, he said he recognized that it might become legal throughout the United States but added that, based on his belief in the Bible, he did not "approve" of it nor believe it was "right." He said that using the word "marriage" to describe same-sex partnerships amounted to a "redefinition" of the word, suggested that the word belonged to the dominant culture (to religious people or to straight people) because the word has been used for "a long time".

In a December 2012 interview, Warren publicly said that religious freedom would be the civil-rights issue of the next decade. He publicly denounced President Obama's record on religious freedom, saying that Obama was "absolutely unfriendly" to religion.

In a May 2014 article in The Washington Post, Warren expressed his support for David and Barbara Green, the owners of Hobby Lobby, in the Burwell v. Hobby Lobby Stores, Inc. case before the U.S. Supreme Court. The case centered on the company's request for a religious exemption to certain portions of the Patient Protection and Affordable Care Act mandate that companies provide employee health insurance. Warren wrote, "The [A]dministration wants everyone to render unto Caesar not only what is Caesar's but also what is God's. If it wins, the first purpose on which the United States was founded would be severely damaged."

== Controversies ==
=== Strategy for church growth ===
In 2006, Wall Street Journal writer Suzanne Sataline cited examples of congregations that have split over the growth strategies and congregations that have expelled members who fought changes. She wrote, "Warren acknowledges that splits occur in congregations that adopt his ideas, though he says he opposes efforts to expel church members."

=== Traditional view of marriage ===
In December 2008, when Warren was announced to lead a prayer at President Barack Obama's inauguration in January, media outlets criticized the choice, accusing Warren of hate speech because he had written in a letter to his church in October that he believed the biblical definition of marriage between one man and one woman should not be changed. A few months earlier, in June 2008, he said that he had developed good relationships with several gay people because of the church's ministry for people living with HIV/AIDS, without having to compromise his biblical beliefs and agree on all subjects. President Obama defended Warren, recalling that he had been invited to speak at Saddleback, despite his differing views on gay people, and that it was this kind of peaceful dialogue that he wanted to implement in inviting Warren. On another side, some evangelical pastors have criticized Warren for not being militant enough against same-sex marriage and abortion. To these critics, he replied that they put too much attention on the fight against gay marriage and abortion.

=== Social work with Muslims ===
In 2009 and 2012, evangelical pastors also criticized him for attending Islamic conferences and wanting to work with Muslims to solve global problems. To these criticisms, he responded that he sought to be a friend to all such as Jesus Christ.

== Works ==
- The Daniel Plan: 40 Days to a Healthier Life (ISBN 978-0310344292)
- The Purpose Driven Church: Growth Without Compromising Your Message And Mission (ISBN 978-0310201069)
- The Purpose Driven Life: What on Earth Am I Here For? (ISBN 978-0310337508)
- Answers to Life's Difficult Questions (ISBN 0966089529)
- The Power to Change Your Life (ISBN 0966089510)
- What on Earth Am I Here For? Booklet (ISBN 0310264839)
- Rick Warren's Bible Study Methods ^{(Previously, "Personal Bible Study Methods")} (ISBN 0966089502)
- The Purpose of Christmas (ISBN 978-1416559009)
- Words To Love By (ISBN 978-0310752820)
- God's Great Love for You (ISBN 978-0310752479)
- God's Big Plans for Me (ISBN 978-0310750390)
- The Lord's Prayer (ISBN 978-0310758501)
- The Purpose Driven Life: 100 Illustrated Devotions for Children (ISBN 978-0310766742)

== See also ==
- List of Southern Baptist Convention affiliated people
- Celebrate Recovery
