= Alan Tippett =

Australian anthropologist (1911–1988)

Alan Richard Tippett (9 November 1911 – 16 September 1988) was a Methodist missionary, missiologist, and anthropologist.

== Life ==
Tippett was an Australian missionary to the Fiji Islands for more than 20 years, and an academic in the United States.

Born 9 November 1911 in St Arnaud, Victoria, Alan Tippett was the son of William Tippett, a Methodist pastor from a family with a long tradition of Wesleyan involvement. He graduated from the University of Melbourne in 1934 and the Methodist Church Training College in 1935. He was ordained in 1938 and worked in churches in Tasmania and Victoria.

With his young family, he worked as a missionary with the Fijian Methodist Church from 1941 to 1961.

He was a professor at Northwest Christian College, Eugene, Oregon between 1961 and 1964. He earned his Ph.D. in anthropology at the University of Oregon in 1964 and taught part-time in the Institute of Church Growth, Fuller Theological Seminary.

Tippett also served as professor of Missionary Anthropology at Fuller Theological Seminary's School of World Mission in Pasadena, California.

In the spring of 1965, an invitation was extended to him and Donald McGavran to move the Institute of Church Growth to Pasadena, where the school would become another satellite school to the Fuller Theological Seminary.

The faculty was expanded to include such scholars as Ralph D. Winter in history, Arthur Glasser in theology, Charles H. Kraft to join Tippett in anthropology, and C. Peter Wagner in church growth. As church growth ideas matured, they were incorporated by McGavran into the basic textbook of the movement, Understanding Church Growth (Eerdmans), published in 1970. Tippett authored over 500 pieces of literary work as part of his contributions to missions and he helped pioneer the theory as well as practice of missiological anthropology.

In 1977 he retired to Canberra, Australia, where he died 16 September 1988.

== Books ==
- Tippett, A.R., 1954, The Christian (Fiji 1835–1867), Auckland Institute and Museum, Auckland.
- Tippett, A.R., 1967, Solomon Islands Christianity: a study in growth and obstruction, Lutterworth Press, London.
- Tippett, A.R., 1970. Church Growth and the Word of God, Eerdmans, Grand Rapids.
- Tippett, A.R., 1971, People Movements in Southern Polynesia, Moody Press, Chicago.
- Tippett, A.R., 1973, Aspects of Pacific Ethnohistory, William Carey Library, Pasadena, CA.
- Tippett, A.R., 1977, The Deep Sea Canoe: Third World Missionaries in the South Pacific, William Carey Library, Pasadena, CA.
- Tippett, A.R., 1987, Introduction to Missiology, William Carey Library, Pasadena, CA
