= Manilal (disambiguation) =

Manilal Gandhi (1892–1956) was a South African writer and activist.

Manilal may also refer to:

- Arun Manilal Gandhi (1934–2023), an Indian-American activist, son of Manilal Gandhi
- Mani Lal Bhaumik (b. 1931), an Indian-American physicist and author
- Manilal Dand, an Indian businessman
- Manilal Desai (1939–1966), an Indian poet
- Manilal Ambalal Desai (1878–1926), an Indian-born Kenyan journalist and politician
- Manilal Doctor (1881–1956), an Indian lawyer and politician
- Manilal Dwivedi (1858–1898), an Indian writer, poet and philosopher
- Sunil Manilal Kothari, an Indian dance historian
- K. S. Manilal (1938–2025), an Indian botanist
- Manilal Nag (b. 1939), an Indian musician
- Pransukh Manilal Nayak (1910–1989), an Indian actor, director and playwright
- Manilal C. Parekh (1885–1967), an Indian Christian theologian
- Harilal Manilal Patel (b. 1941), a Fiji Indian lawyer and politician
- Manilal H. Patel (b. 1949), an Indian writer
- Manilal Chaturbhai Shah, an Indian politician
- Jaishanker Manilal Shelat (1908–1985), a Supreme Court of India judge
