= Ralph D. Winter =

American missiologist (1924–2009)

- Born: December 8, 1924; Los Angeles, California, United States
- Died: May 20, 2009 (aged 84); Pasadena, California, United States
- Education: California Institute of Technology, B.S. in Civil Engineering; Columbia University, MA in TESL; Princeton Theological Seminary, B.Div. Cornell University, PhD in Linguistics, Anthropology, Mathematical Statistics
- Occupations: Missiologist, scholar, professor
- Spouses: Roberta Helm; Barbara Scotchmer
- Parent(s): Hugo H. Winter (civil engineer) and Hazel Patterson

Ralph Dana Winter (December 8, 1924 – May 20, 2009) was an American missiologist and Presbyterian missionary who helped pioneer Theological Education by Extension, raised the debate about the role of the church and mission structures and became well known as the advocate for pioneer outreach among unreached people groups. He was the founder of the U.S. Center for World Mission (USCWM, now Frontier Ventures), William Carey International University, and the International Society for Frontier Missiology.

His 1974 presentation at the Congress for World Evangelization in Lausanne, Switzerland – an event organized by American evangelist Billy Graham – was a watershed moment for global mission.

It was during this presentation that Winter shifted global mission strategy from a focus on political boundaries to a focus on distinct people groups. Winter argued that instead of targeting countries, mission agencies needed to target the thousands of people groups worldwide, over half of which have not been reached with the gospel message.

Billy Graham once wrote: “Ralph Winter has not only helped promote evangelism among many mission boards around the world, but by his research, training and publishing he has accelerated world evangelization."

In 2005, Winter was named by Time magazine as one of the 25 Most Influential Evangelicals in America. Dr. Ray Tallman, shortly after Winter's death, described him as "perhaps the most influential person in missions of the last 50 years and has influenced missions globally more than anyone I can think of."

== Early adulthood and works ==
Winter grew up in the Los Angeles area. His father, Hugo, was a self-trained engineer who ended up leading a division of the L.A. planning department with 1,200 engineers under his leadership and was instrumental in the development of the greater L.A. Freeway system. When World War II broke out, Ralph was too young to enlist, so he studied for just two and a half years at Caltech and earned his B.S. degree, in order to join the U.S. Navy's pilot training program. Before he finished that training, the war ended and he was discharged, but his service in the Navy helped pay for his further education. He then went on to earn his MA at Columbia University, and PhD at Cornell University, and then a B.Div. at Princeton Theological Seminary. With childhood friend Dan Fuller (son of revival preacher Charles E. Fuller), he also studied at Fuller Theological Seminary in Pasadena, Calif., the first semester the school was open in 1947. He would later teach there. Winter was one of the Donald McGavran, the founding Dean of the Mission School, early faculty hires. It was during Ralph’s era at Fuller Theological Seminary that he created the E-Scale evangelism which was one of his greatest contributions to global missions as this change the missionary outlook from focusing on countries to people - groups within nation-states.

At Princeton Seminary, Winter met future Campus Crusade for Christ (CCC) founder Bill Bright. The two Christian leaders maintained a close friendship throughout their lives until Bright's death in 2003.

In 1951, Winter married his first wife, Roberta Helm, with whom he would later establish the USCWM in Pasadena. The couple, along with their four young daughters, served as Presbyterian missionaries to Guatemala from 1956 to 1966.

It was in Guatemala where Winter (with Paul Emery and others) helped further the idea of getting theological training to rural pastors.Theological Education by Extension (TEE) program is the precursor for modern-day theological distance education programs and the multi-campus models used by schools and seminaries today. Winter and later Ross Kinsler, promoted TEE globally.

Ralph Winter (far left) in Guatemala

The idea behind TEE was to make it easier for local church leaders to learn and be ordained as ministers without relocating them and their families for years to the capital city to attend seminary. These students could continue their ministry while studying at extension campuses near their town or village. Then, once a month, they would go to the seminary in the capital city to study.

The Theological Education by Extension idea inspired a movement and soon similar programs were replicated around the world. Although many credit him for the TEE idea, Winter points to missionary James Emery, who had served in Guatemala before him, for conceiving the idea upon which he built.

Donald McGavran at Fuller Theological Seminary's School of World Mission was so impressed by the TEE education and other writings by Ralph, that he asked Winter to join the faculty with him and Alan Tippett, a noted anthropologist. Winter was a professor at Fuller from 1966 to 1976. During this time, Winter taught more than a thousand missionaries who he said helped him learn about the global mission fields.

It was also in these years that he founded the William Carey Library, (now, William Carey Publishing) which publishes and distributes mission materials; co-founded the American Society of Missiology; launched what is now the Perspectives Study Program (first called the Summer Institute of International Studies); and presented the idea of the "hidden peoples," which later became synonymous with the phrase "unreached peoples," at the 1974 Lausanne Congress in Switzerland.

== Later life and works ==
After the 1974 Lausanne Congress, Winter and his wife Roberta felt there needed to be a place to tackle cultural and linguistic barriers hindering the sharing of the Gospel with all peoples. In 1976, Winter left his secure, tenured position at Fuller Theological Seminary to focus on calling attention to the unreached peoples. In November 1976, the Winters founded the mission think tank USCWM (now Frontier Ventures) with no staff but their secretary and only $100 in cash.

Ralph (right) and Roberta (left) Winter on the campus of William Carey International University in Pasadena, Calif.

Calling himself a "Christian social engineer," Winter helped found a number of other organizations and groups, in addition to William Carey Library, including William Carey International University (1977), the International Society for Frontier Missiology (1986), and the Institute for the Study of the Origins of Disease (1999).

In the last year of his life, Winter helped organize the Tokyo 2010 Global Mission Consultation, which was held in May 2010. Tokyo 2010 brought together around 1,000 mission leaders to discuss the unfinished task of reaching the world's remaining least-reached peoples.

Steve Richardson argues that Winter "effectively reframed the unfinished task and the church's understanding of the Great Commission in terms of reaching unreached ethnolinguistic people groups."

== Recognition ==
In 2005, Winter was named by Time magazine as one of the 25 Most Influential Evangelicals in America.

He was presented the 2008 Lifetime of Service Award at the North American Mission Leaders Conference of Missio Nexus (formerly The Mission Exchange).

== Death ==
Winter died on May 20, 2009, at the age of 84 from multiple myeloma and lymphoma.

== Family ==
Winter's first wife, Roberta, died of multiple myeloma in 2001, just six weeks shy of their 50th anniversary. He remarried on July 6, 2002, to Barbara Scotchmer, a long-time family friend. In total, Winter had four daughters (Elizabeth, Rebecca, Linda and Patricia) with Roberta. All four of his daughters are involved in mission activities. At the time of his death, Winter had 14 grandchildren, two great-granddaughters and one great-grandson. He had two brothers, David K. Winter, president of Westmont College for many years, and Paul Winter, structural engineer. His parents were Hazel Clare (Patterson) Winter and Hugo H. Winter, also known as "Mr. Freeway" for his role in the early development of the freeway system in Los Angeles County.

== Mottos in life ==
"Never do anything others can do or will do, when there are things to be done that others can't do or won't" – Dawson Trotman (founder of The Navigators, a big influence on Winter in his youth)

“Risk is not to be evaluated in terms of the probability of success but by the value of the goal" – Dr. Ralph D. Winter

“Nothing that does not occur daily will ever dominate your life" – Dr. Ralph D. Winter

"If it is worth doing, it is worth doing poorly" – a slight variation of a quote from G. K. Chesterton "If a thing is worth doing, it is worth doing badly."

"You can get a lot done if you don't care who gets the credit" – Dr. Ralph D. Winter
