= William McElwee Miller =

American missionary (1892–1993)

William McElwee Miller (December 12, 1892 – July 7, 1993) was an American missionary to Persia, and author of several books.

Born in Middlesboro, Kentucky, Miller received a M.A. in 1913 from Washington and Lee University, and a B.D. in 1919 from Princeton Theological Seminary. He went to Persia (Iran) as a missionary of the Presbyterian Church and, except for a short period around 1932, he remained in Persia until 1962.

As a part of his missionary work, he learned Persian and studied Islam, particularly Shi'a Islam, Persia and Persian culture. During his missionary work in Persia, he also encountered followers of the Baháʼí Faith, a large religious minority there. Much of his ministerial work involved developing Christian apologetic responses to these religions.

With respect to the Baháʼí Faith, his Baha'ism, Its Origin, History and Teachings, published in 1931, was the first of two books, and several apologetic and polemical articles on the subject. Along with Earl E. Elder he translated Bahá'u'lláh's Kitáb-i-Aqdas, one of the central books of the religion; this translation was published by the Royal Asiatic Society in 1961. In 1974, a new follow-up, The Baha'i Faith: Its History and Teachings added additional material not available previously, made available to the author by a known opponent of the Bahá'í Faith.

After 1962, he retired with his wife to Mount Airy, Pennsylvania, where he lived until she died, and then went to live in a retirement home until his own death in Philadelphia, Pennsylvania in 1993.

== Works ==
- 'Translation of Al-Babu'l-Hadi' Ashar by Al-Hilli, a treatise on the theological doctrine of Shi'ite Muslims'; London, Royal Asiatic Society, 1928.
- Baha'ism, Its Origin, History and Teachings. New York: Fleming H. Revell Co., 1931.
- Earl E. Elder and William McElwee Miller (Trs.) (1961). AL-KITĀB AL-AQDAS. London: Royal Asiatic Society. ISBN 0-947593-20-9.
- William McElwee Miller (1974). The Bahá'í Faith: Its History and Teachings. Pasadena, CA: William Carey Library. ISBN 0-87808-137-2.
- A Christian's Response to Islam; Phillipsburg, NJ: Presbyterian and Reformed Publishing Co., 1976
- Ten Muslims Meet Christ. Grand Rapids, Michigan; Cambridge, UK: Eerdmans. 1969.
- My Persian Pilgrimage, ISBN 0-87808-214-X; William Carey Library, 1989
- Tales of Persia: A Book for Children, ISBN 0-87552-292-0; Presbyterian and Reformed Pub Co, 1988
- Tales Of Persia: Missionary Stories From Islamic Iran, ISBN 0-87552-615-2, Presbyterian and Reformed Pub Co, 2005
- Beliefs and practices of Christians - also titled What is Christianity

== Sources ==
- Miller, William (1974). The Baha'i (sic) Faith: Its History and Teachings. Pasadena, CA: William Carey Library. ISBN 0-87808-137-2.
- Elwell-Sutton, L.P. (1976). "Baha'i (sic) Faith: Its History and Teachings, The, by William Miller". Journal of the Royal Asiatic Society of Great Britain and Ireland. 28 (3): 157–158. doi:10.1017/S0035869X00133416. S2CID 162531277.
- Martin, Douglas (1978). "Missionary as Historian: William Miller and the Baha'i Faith (sic), a review of Miller's 'The Baha'i Faith: Its History and Teachings'". Baha'i Studies. 40 (3).
