= WCIU =

WCIU may refer to:

- WCIU-TV, a television station in Chicago, Illinois
- William Carey International University, Pasadena, California
