= William Carey International University =

- Type: Private
- Established: 1977
- President: Paul Cornelius, PhD
- Academic staff: 8 full-time (11 Field Personnel)
- Administrative staff: 12
- Postgraduates: 5 (2022)
- Location: Pasadena, California, United States
- Colors: Green and Gold
- Website: www.wciu.edu

William Carey International University (WCIU) is a private faith-based university in Pasadena, California, USA, that provides distance education programs. WCIU offers online-only graduate degree programs in International Development with various specializations and is affiliated with several Christian non-governmental organizations.

The institution was founded in 1977 by Ralph D. Winter, a Presbyterian missiologist who also established the U.S. Center for World Mission. The school also publishes books on culture and global issues. It is named for William Carey (1761–1834), a British missionary who worked in India.

== History ==
William Carey International University (WCIU) was incorporated in February 1977, and licensed by the state of California to grant degrees. The university was founded under the leadership of Dr. Ralph D. Winter, who led the effort to purchase the 17-acre campus and housing of the former Nazarene College. WCIU was established to provide education to improve international development practices.

Dr. Winter envisioned a holistic curriculum that integrated history with social sciences, focusing exclusively on international development with an emphasis on practical, field-based experimentation. The university would employ a diverse, experienced, and dispersed faculty using a mentored approach to education, and would work closely with non-governmental voluntary agencies worldwide. In 1978, the State of California granted WCIU institutional approval to offer Bachelor of Arts, Master of Arts, and Doctor of Philosophy degrees in International Development. The university was based on the education by extension model without residency requirements.

Initially, WCIU granted only the Doctor of Philosophy degree in international development. By 1994, the university had nine graduates.

Shortly after the PhD program was started, WCIU began offering BA and MA degrees in international development with specializations in intercultural communications, intercultural studies, community development, applied linguistics, and TESOL.

Between 1994 and 2006, WCIU Faculty focused on developing, implementing, and revising its patented World Christian Foundations (WCF) curriculum, intended "to re-engineer the liberal arts and seminary curricula into an integrated framework that looks at God’s global purposes throughout history." This course became the foundation of WCIU’s BA and MA degree programs.

After the death in 2009 of Dr. Winter, Dr. Beth Snodderly was appointed an interim president and served until January 2016. In May 2017, Dr. Kevin Higgins was appointed as president.

In 2013, the university decided to focus on graduate programs and ceased enrollments in the BA in international development degree program. In a further effort to refine the university’s mission, the Ph.D. degree program entered into a teach-out phase and ceased enrollments in 2015. Students have been notified they have until July 2020 to finish their PhD degree program. In 2019 there were a total of 51 students, of which 28 were PhD students. The university continues to focus on the MA in international development degree program, which focuses on social, cultural, and religious factors that have affected global development throughout history.

In 2019, the campus in Pasadena was sold to EF Education First, which has a plan to establish a private boarding high school.

== Accreditation ==
WICU was founded in 1977 and is a private not for profit institution, approved by the California Bureau for Private Postsecondary Education to offer M.A. and Ph.D. degrees in international development. This license does not imply an endorsement or recommendation by the Bureau. The Bureau inspected WCIU on January 4, 2013.

WCIU’s degree programs are currently accredited by the Distance Education Accreditation Council, which is an accreditor recognized by the U.S Department of Education. WCIU currently offers a Master of Arts in development studies and Master of Arts in transformational urban leadership (MATUL). (https://www.wciu.edu Sep. 2022)

The Christian education organization the International Council for Higher Education has also validated these programs.

== Library ==
Kenneth Scott Latourette is honored at the campus of William Carey International University. The main library building is named after Latourette.

Latourette Library holds the following collections:

- Ralph D. Winter's books and archives
- Donald McGavran
- A special South Asia collection
- A nomadic peoples collection
- All books published by the school
- Student Theses and Dissertations

== Notable alumni ==
- Vishal Mangalwadi

== See also ==
- Providence Christian College in Pasadena California, which collaborates on the Venture Center campus with WCIU.
