= Dand =

Dand may refer to:

- Hindu push-up, a type of push-up that is also called a Dand
- Dand, Manitoba, Canada
- Dand District, Afghanistan
- Dan-D, rapper

== People with the surname ==
- Dhairya Dand, American inventor and artist
- Manilal Dand, Indian businessman
