= James Emery =

James Emery may refer to:

- James Emery (musician) (born 1951), American jazz guitarist
- James Emery (missionary) (died 1999), missionary in Guatemala with the Presbyterian Church
- Sir James Frederick Emery (1886–1983), British Member of Parliament for Salford West
- James L. Emery (born 1931), American politician from New York
- Jim Emery (born 1934), American politician in the South Dakota House of Representatives

== See also ==
- James Emery Paster (1945–1989), American serial killer
- James Emery White (born 1961), American theologian
