= Phil Parshall =

Author and Protestant missionary

Phillip L. Parshall is an author and Christian Protestant missionary, noted for his contributions on contextual theology and insider movements.

He has a Doctor of Missiology from Fuller Theological Seminary, Fellowships at Harvard University and Yale Divinity School, and has been a missionary among Muslims (in Bangladesh and the Philippines) since the 1970s.

He is the author of several articles and books on Christianity, missionary work and Muslims.

His impact has been evaluated in a book about him, The Life and Impact of Phil Parshall: Connecting with Muslims.

== Works ==
- Lifting the Veil (InterVarsity Press, 2002).
- The cross and the crescent : understanding the Muslim heart and mind (Gabriel, 2002)
- Inside the community : understanding Muslims through their traditions (Mich Baker Books, 1994)
- The fortress and the fire : Jesus Christ and the challenge of Islam (Gospel Literature Service, 1975)
- Divine threads within a human tapestry : memoirs of Phil Parshall. (William Carey Library, 2000)
- The God next door : opening doors to friendship and understanding with Muslims
- New Paths in Muslim Evangelism (Baker Book House, 1980)
- Muslim evangelism: evangelical approaches to contextualization (Biblica: IVP Books, 2003)
- Bridges to Islam: A Christian Perspective on Folk Islam, (InterVarsity Press, 2006)
