= USCWM =

USCWM may refer to:

- U.S. Center for World Mission, a Christian mission organization founded by Ralph D. Winter, later known as Venture Center
- USCWM, the UN/LOCODE for Chatham, Virginia
