= Insider movement =

Network of people who observe Christianity in their own way

In Christian missiology, an insider movement is a group or network of people from a non-Christian religion who consider themselves followers of Jesus while remaining relationally, culturally and socially a part of the religious community of their birth. Though members of insider movements do not typically join Christian churches in their area or region, they may see themselves as part of the wider Body of Christ. It has been observed that as members of these groups follow Jesus and the Bible, they personally reject, reinterpret, or modify the non-biblical beliefs found in their religious communities. This process makes them different in some ways from their co-religionists, yet when groups can faithfully follow Jesus without formally disassociating themselves from their religious communities, insider movements can occur. Such movements have been observed among a number of religious groups, most notably among Jews, Muslims and Hindus.

Since the 1990s there has been considerable debate among students of missiology as to whether there can truly be faithful followers of Jesus who remain vitally within their former religious culture. Many observers of insider movements have concluded in the affirmative based largely upon their personal relationships with these followers of Jesus. Critics of insider movements are extremely skeptical that persons or groups can effectively reject or modify non-Biblical beliefs and practices within their cultural/religious communities due to the strong social and spiritual pressure of those communities. Therefore, critics believe that any attempt to stay within a non-Christian religious community will lead to a blending of religious beliefs that is syncretistic, untenable, or heretical: an essentialist view of world religions.

== Definitions ==
Lewis (2007) offers the following widely used definition of an insider movement:

An insider movement is any movement to faith in Christ where (a) the gospel flows through pre-existing communities and social networks, and where (b) believing families, as valid expressions of the Body of Christ, remain inside their socio-religious communities, retaining their identity as members of that community while living under the Lordship of Jesus Christ and the authority of the Bible.

Higgins' (2004) definition is similar to that of Lewis:

A growing number of families, individuals, clans, and/or friendship-webs becoming faithful disciples of Jesus within the culture of their people group, including their religious culture. This faithful discipleship will express itself in culturally appropriate communities of believers who will also continue to live within as much of their culture, including the religious life of the culture, as is biblically faithful. The Holy Spirit, through the Word and through His people will also begin to transform His people and their culture, religious life and worldview.

== Emergence of insider movements as a social phenomenon ==
The Bible describes Jesus as preaching to Jewish, Samaritan and gentile communities and his apostles and the early church did the same. According to insider movement advocates, Jesus preached about the Kingdom of God, not about forming a new religious tradition. Over time, however, this basic message of faith took on cultural and linguistic expressions of the peoples and societies where the message was being embraced. The most prominent of these expressions was Christianity, which began as a Greek community and movement of Jesus followers.

In the last two centuries, millions of people from animistic, tribal, and ethnic religious traditions responded to the gospel message, but relatively few responded from the larger, often state-supported faiths of the world's major religious traditions such as Islam, Hinduism, Buddhism, Shinto, Judaism and Sikhism. Due to the effects of Western colonialism, mission efforts were often seen as attempts to Christianize. These colonial period mission efforts often combined faith in Jesus with aspects of western culture (Westernization) and the religious forms and practices of Anglicans, Catholics, Presbyterians, Baptists, and other missionary sending denominations from Western countries.

As Western colonies began to gain their independence in the later half of the 20th century, mission practitioners and missiologists began to question many paradigms of colonial mission practice. Concepts such as people movements, indigenization, contextualization, and incarnational ministry began to challenge earlier methodologies.

At the same time, some adherents of the world's major religious traditions became attracted to Jesus, yet were not drawn to the religion or institution of Christianity. In the 1960s, for example, numbers of Jews, after significant study, came to the conclusion that Jesus was indeed the long-awaited Messiah. Yet they had no emotional or cultural link to the Christian religion, which was often seen as a part of Christendom, and associated with countries that had historically mistreated Jews. Therefore, when these Jews embraced Jesus as Messiah, many opted to remain within Judaism rather than convert to Christianity. Since the 1980s, similar phenomena have been seen among those of other non-Christian religious cultures, most notably among Hindus and Muslims. Many Jews do not regard Messianic Jews as being true Jews anymore, however. Furthermore, some Jewish followers of Christ have come to consider that the term Messianic Judaism was a mistake, because it placed "the emphasis on rabbinic Judaism instead of Jewish culture".

Proponents of insider movements claim the term does not refer to the blending of two or more religions, morphed into a new religion, as found in the Chrislam sect of Nigeria. Rather, in their view, insider movements refer to grass-roots movements to Jesus, often beginning with healings, dreams, care shown by Christ-following friends, and other spiritual encounters. The way is then often open for further discovery of Jesus through the Bible, radio broadcasts, and other means. If these groups of people who decide to follow Jesus choose to remain within the non-Christian religious communities of their birth, observers often refer to them as insider movements. According to this framework, insider movements are not initiated by outsiders, nor are they a type of missionary strategy or methodology. Rather they are a social phenomena which emerge as entire families, communities, and social networks decide to follow Jesus together within their cultural tradition.

== Controversy ==
=== The essentialist view and the cultural view of world religions ===
Underlying the question of following Jesus within various religio-cultural systems is an understanding of the nature of world religions. An essentialist approach suggests that each major religion has a core set of beliefs that differs from all the other major religions. Religions are seen as monolithic, with a prevailing interpretation of core doctrine that defines the worldview of its adherents. A cultural approach to world religions, however, holds that they are a conglomeration of diverse communities, defined more by traditions, history and customs than a singular stated core theology. While the essentialist view has traditionally been held, current research in the field of religious studies challenges the essentialist view. Evidence points to a great variety of doctrines and practices within each of the major religious traditions. In practice, many Hindus, Muslims and Christians follow religious traditions with very minimal personal understanding of core beliefs.

In terms of insider movements, opponents generally adhere to the essentialist viewpoint, and hold that any mixing of religious traditions involves confusion and compromise. Those who support the validity of following Jesus as a part of an insider movement, on the other hand, tend to adhere to the cultural view of religions, rejecting an essentialist view, although they do affirm two essentials: a commitment to living under the Lordship of Jesus Christ and the authority of the Bible. They note the diversity of thought and practice within any given religious label, and see leeway in non-Christian communities for a legitimate expression of following Jesus to develop. They thus contend that a Muslim or Hindu or Buddhist follower of Jesus does not necessarily create confusion or compromise, but can represent an appropriate expression of personal identity.

=== Religious identity and cultural heritage ===
Supporters of insider movements contend that many religious adherents, especially outside western nations, treat religious identity as the key component of their cultural heritage and a function of birth identity, such as in the case of cultural Muslims, cultural Christians, or cultural Jews. There is a perceived or actual fusion of religious identity and practice with most or all other aspects of life. Furthermore, in some cases, legal and political restrictions make changing religions impossible, thus to be a part of that culture, one must remain nominally a part of that religion. Proponents of insider movements affirm expressions of faith in Jesus that emerge within non-Christian religions (insider movements), holding that they provide opportunities to follow Jesus for individuals and families so inclined, especially when it is exceedingly difficult or unimaginable for them to leave the religious community of their birth. Those who oppose insider movements contend that leaving one's non-Christian religious community should be encouraged for all who follow Jesus, regardless of the difficulty or impossibility of changing religious identity, and that the faith of those who do not leave the religious communities of their birth is tenuous.

== Insider movements among Hindus ==
Among Hindus there are few documented cases of insider movements but there are many notable "inside individuals" who lived out the principles of insider movements.

Kali Charan Banurji (1847–1907) commented in 1870 that "In having become Christians, we have not ceased to be Hindus. We are Hindu Christians, as thoroughly Hindu as Christian." Today this might be considered a case of multiple religious belonging rather than following Christ as a Hindu, but Banurji influenced his nephew, Brahmabandhab Upadhyay, whose pilgrimage as a Hindu following Christ is widely known.

Kandaswamy Chetty was a well known south Indian who identified with Christ but rejected conversion to Christianity in the early 20th century. Manilal Parekh (1885–1967) was a Gujarati who was baptized as a Christian but opposed the Western and institutional nature of Christianity in India, later identifying himself as a Hindu disciple of Jesus before still later seeking to develop a new syncretistic faith. K. Subba Rao (1912–1981) of Andhra Pradesh developed the most significant movement of Hindus following Jesus, as documented in a number of studies.

A study of Churchless Christianity in Tamil Nadu by Herbert E. Hoefer drew attention to the widespread phenomena of Hindu discipleship to Jesus in contemporary India. Hoefer declined to consider this a movement despite impressive numbers, mainly because there was no indication of interaction among the numerous individuals who were following Jesus as Hindus. Hoefer noted a movement in Sivakasi where three generations of Hindu women have followed Jesus, as recently studied again by Eliza Kent. More recently, Paul Pennington (2017) offered biblical exegesis aimed at dismantling Christian practices that are offensive to Hindus and showing ways that Hindus can follow Jesus without renouncing their Hindu cultural traditions and heritage.

== Insider movements among Muslims ==
=== Development of missiological thinking on insider movements within Islam ===
An early published writing on the topic of Muslims following Jesus while still remaining a part of their own religious community is a 1941 article by Henry H. Riggs. Riggs stressed that in much of the world, religion, politics and culture are highly interrelated and that Jesus needs to be brought into existing social and religious groups in order to make following him a viable option. In 1969, a Southern Baptist missionary, Virginia Cobb working among Muslims in the Middle East, stressed the centrality of Jesus in Christian witness: "We are not trying to change anyone's religion. Religion consists of affiliation with a group, cult, ethic, dogma and structure of authority…The New Testament is quite clear that none of this saves. It is possible to change all of them without knowing God….[O]ur message is a person we've experienced, not a doctrine, system, [or] religion…"

Articles on this issue began to emerge in mission publications in the mid-1970s. John Wilder, a Presbyterian missionary to Muslims in South Asia, observed that thousands of Muslims were open to Jesus, yet few were taking the step of accepting him as savior. He believed a major problem was in having to leave Islam and joining another religion, an act viewed by Muslims as "the ultimate betrayal, a stab in the back to family, clan and nation." Wilder suggested a way forward was to follow Jesus in ways that were culturally appropriate and still honored family and community. Martin Goldsmith highlighted the inseparability of religion from life in Islamic societies:

Islam is within the whole warp and woof of society-in the family, in politics, in social relationships. To leave the Muslim faith is to break with one's whole society…Many a modern educated Muslim is not all that religiously minded; but he must, nevertheless, remain a Muslim for social reasons...This makes it almost unthinkable for most Muslims even to consider the possibility of becoming a follower of some other religion.

In that light, British mission leader John Anderson wrote that a great "sin" of missionaries was trying to persuade Muslims who accept Jesus to leave Islam. He asserted that by pushing Muslims who follow Christ from "the culture of Islam" missionaries had unintentionally "robbed Islam of the most powerful reasons why it should reconsider Jesus Christ." In 1979 Harvie Conn and Charles Kraft published important articles in this discussion on the nature of Islam, Muslim culture and new ways to follow Christ. In 1989 Dudley Woodberry produced a seminal article that showed strong links between Muslim beliefs and practices and those of Jews and early Christians, as well as mentioning, without naming the country, one of the first case studies of an insider movement. In 1998 Evangelical Missions Quarterly articles by Phil Parshall and J. Travis described and critiqued six types of Christ-centered communities found in Muslim majority regions of the world.

In the year 2000 the International Journal of Frontier Missions devoted an entire issue to this topic. Since then numerous articles have appeared in mission circles, bringing greater clarity to insider movements (also referred to as Jesus Movements), such as those by Rick Brown, Kevin Higgins and the 2010 article by Travis and Woodberry in Mission Frontiers. A further study by Doug Coleman published in 2011 analyzed insider movements based on available literature at the time from four perspectives (theology of religions, revelation, soteriology and ecclesiology).

Authors and missiologists whose articles illustrate both sides of the debate are Gary Corwin and Timothy Tennent, with responses by John Travis, Phil Parshall, Herbert Hoefer, Rebecca Lewis, and Kevin Higgins. More recent articles showing both sides come from J.S. Williams, Joseph Cumming and four articles in the January 2013 edition of Christianity Today. That same year the Evangelical Review of Theology paired four critics with four associates of IMs to discuss biblical theology, ethics, and scripture translation. In 2015, Harley Talman and John Jay Travis edited and published Understanding Insider Movements, the most comprehensive work to date, addressing historical, biblical, theological, missiological, ecclesiastical and sociological issues surrounding IMs. It generated an extensive, mostly critical, rejoinder edited by Ayman Ibrahim and Ant Greenham.

Genealogies of the development of the ideas surrounding insider movements and contextualization from a critical perspective have been composed by Matthew Sleeman (surveying literature from 1998 to 2010) and J. Henry Wolfe. From a supportive viewpoint, Harley Talman traced the history of insider movement thought and practice going back to the late 19th century. Jans Hendrick Prenger surveyed the main documents and organizational postures in the insider movement debate. In so doing he sought to remedy a serious omission: "the major stakeholders that are mostly still missing from the scene of the investigation are the insiders themselves."

=== Examples of insider movements among Muslims ===
The initial stages of most movements within Islamic cultures can be traced back to one or more Christians who initially shared their beliefs with a Muslim. In addition to the case mentioned by Woodberry, a few of the early case studies to have been published were Rick Brown's "Brother Jacob and Master Isaac: How One Insider Movement Began," as well as John Travis' "Messianic Muslim Followers of Jesus." More recently, Prenger conducted field interviews of twenty-six leaders of Muslim insider movements across Asia and parts of Africa. While they held to a range of theological and missional paradigms, he found them to be quite healthy theologically. Additional glimpses may be found in two important studies of recent movements to Christ among Muslims. Though not labeled as such, they appear to include some insider movements.

== Insider movements among other religious traditions ==
William A. Dyrness provides case studies of insider movements in varied religious contexts, including Latin American indigenous peoples, African traditional religions and Buddhist communities in Asia. Banpote Wetchgama, leader of the "New Buddhists" argues that Buddhists must retain the heritage of their ancestors, just as Jews of the New Testament decided to preserve their Jewish heritage. Additional sources on Buddhist insider developments are Marie Bauer and Peter Thein Nyunt. but the literature is scant in comparison with Hindu and Muslim movements.

In their 2019 book Seeking Church, Duerksen and Dyrness discuss the struggle of Christianity in Japan and the hope of some in that context for a new expression of "church". Duerksen and Dyrness also reference some of the contextual practices of U.S. Native American Christ-followers and insider movements among Indian Hindu and Filipino Muslim communities. They argue that though some of these expressions of "church" are new, the process God is using to help shape such Christ-following communities is not. Rather, these movements, and church movements past and present, illustrate how churches and Christ-following communities have always expressed their faith in Christ via the norms and practices of their cultural and religious contexts. In general, the phenomenon of following Jesus without joining a Christian church or branch of Christianity or repudiating one's own religious community is also acknowledged in the statistics of the World Christian Data Base. The Center for the Study of Global Christianity at Gordon-Conwell Theological Seminary estimates that as of 2020 approximately 7.4 million non-Christians were following Christ from within the context of their own religious and cultural traditions. These include messianic movements as well as hidden and media believers. The Center's estimate for the year 2000 was 4.6 million so these movements grew at 2.4% per year from 2000 to 2020 or twice as fast as Christianity as a whole. While the vast majority are either Hindus or Muslims, 13% (nearly 1 million) are from other non-Christian religions.

== See also ==
- Messianic Judaism
- Social movement
- Simple church
