= Doctor of Ministry =

Professional doctorate in religion

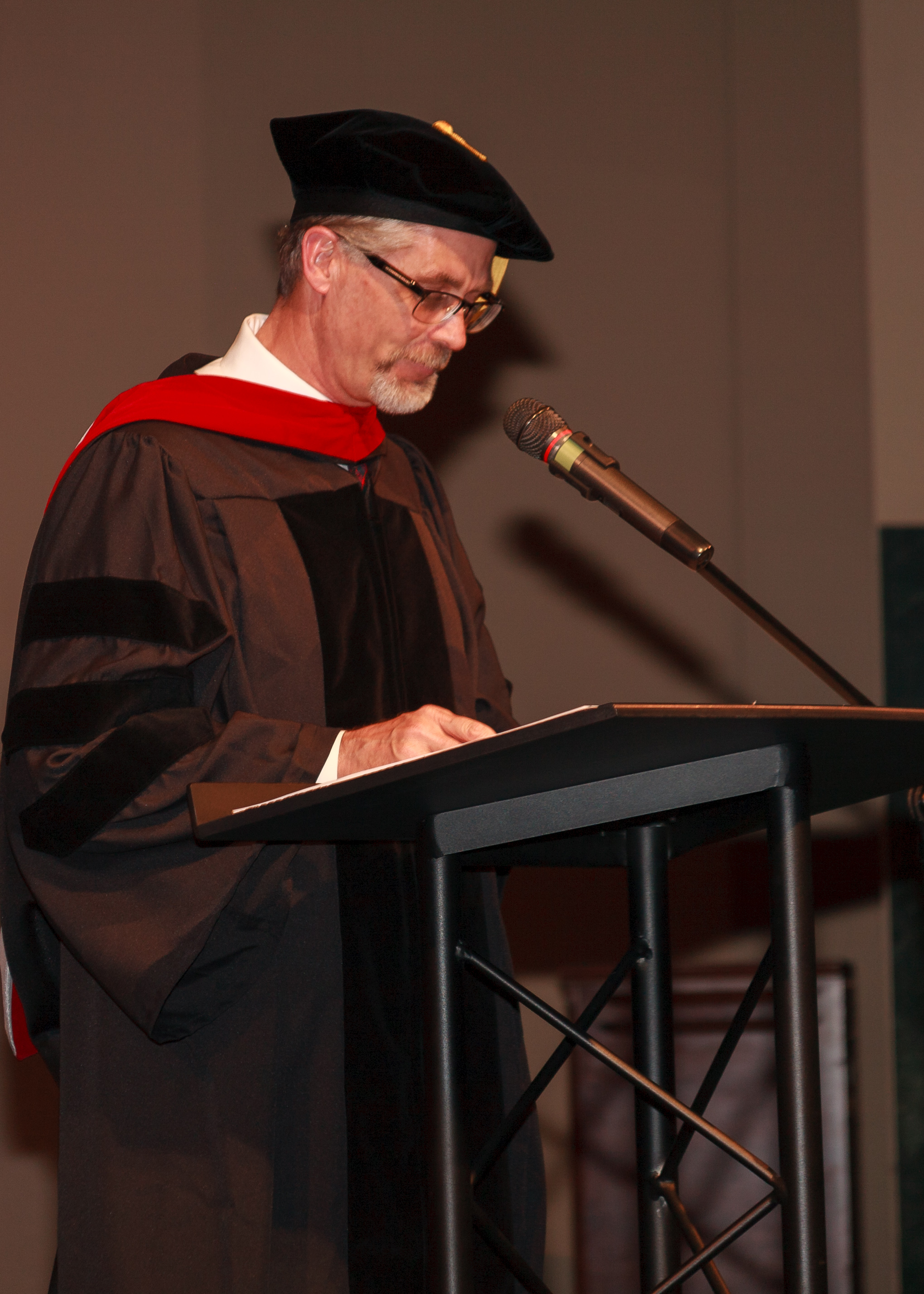
A holder of the DMin in his gown reads during a hooding ceremony for new DMin graduates.

The Doctor of Ministry (DMin) is a doctorate in religious ministry. It includes an original research component, and may be earned by a minister of religion while concurrently engaged in ministry. It is categorized as an advanced doctoral degree that prepares for religious leadership, teaching, and pastoral scholarship. The Doctor of Ministry is primarily concerned with the "acquisition of knowledge and research skills, to further advance or enhance professional practice"

== Doctor of Ministry by Country ==
=== United States and Canada ===
ATS accreditation standards requires matriculants to have a Master of Divinity (MDiv) or its equivalent and no fewer than three years of full-time ministry experience, and candidates to complete at least one year of coursework before the doctoral dissertation or research project. The degree requires a minimum of 30 semester credits. Normally, the degree requires between three and six years to complete. The degree's purpose is to "enhance the practice of ministry for persons who hold the MDiv or its educational equivalent and who have engaged in substantial ministerial leadership."

135 ATS accredited schools offer the degree. Doctor of Ministry concentrations vary by institution and include biblical studies, practical theology, evangelism, pastoral counseling or the psychology of religion, homiletics, spiritual formation, ethics, church growth, church leadership, apologetics and Bible translation.

=== United Kingdom ===
In the United Kingdom, the Doctor of Ministry (DMin) is offered by a number of institutions as a professional doctorate in ministry. The degree includes an original research component and is intended for experienced practitioners. Programmes typically combine taught elements with supervised research in a ministerial or practical-theological context and culminate in a doctoral thesis or portfolio.

Within the UK qualifications framework, the DMin is positioned at doctoral level (Level 8 of the Framework for Higher Education Qualifications), the same level as the Doctor of Philosophy (PhD). At this level, doctoral degrees require the creation and interpretation of new knowledge through original research or advanced scholarship. UK doctorates, including professional doctorates, are aligned with the third cycle of the Bologna Process and are considered equivalent in level to doctoral qualifications across the European Higher Education Area.

St Mary's University, Twickenham offers a Doctor of Ministry as a part-time professional doctorate, typically completed over four to seven years and combining theological reflection with practice-based research.

Although the DMin title is used by only a limited number of UK institutions, closely related professional doctorates in theology and ministry are more widely offered. These include the Doctor of Theology and Ministry (DThM) at Durham University and the Doctor of Theology (DTh) in Practical Theology at the University of Roehampton. Such programmes are similarly structured around advanced study culminating in a substantial research thesis focused on professional or practical-theological inquiry.

=== Australia ===
Under the Australian University of Theology standards, the D.Min. degree is within the Australian Qualifications Framework (AQF level 10) doctoral award, which is equivalent to a Ph.D. or Th.D. which enables graduates to "have systematic and critical understanding of a complex field of learning and specialised research skills for the advancement of learning and/or for professional practice." The degree consists of a coursework component (96 credit points) and a research component (192 credit points). Applicants to the degree program must be able to demonstrate a minimum of 5 years of significant contribution in their ministry context since completion of their first degree.

=== Other countries ===
The Doctor of Ministry (DMin) is also offered in a number of other countries, particularly in institutions influenced by North American models of theological education.

In continental Europe, the degree is offered through partnerships with North American institutions. In Germany, for example, a Doctor of Ministry is delivered at AWM Korntal in cooperation with Columbia International University in the United States, with students enrolled at the American institution while completing coursework and research in Germany.

The degree is also offered by institutions outside the Western context, including seminaries in Asia such as the Asia Graduate School of Theology, which provides a Doctor of Ministry programme designed for experienced ministry practitioners and structured around advanced study and applied research. In countries such as South Korea, DMin programmes are offered through seminaries and extension programmes associated with North American theological institutions, often delivered in the Korean language for local ministry contexts.

Across these contexts, DMin programmes typically emphasize the integration of academic research and professional practice, consistent with the characteristics of professional doctorates described in international higher education frameworks.

== See also ==
- Doctor of Theology
- Master of Theology
- Master of Divinity
- Master of Theological Studies
- Bachelor of Divinity
