= Vishal Mangalwadi =

Indian Christian writer and speaker

Dr Vishal Mangalwadi
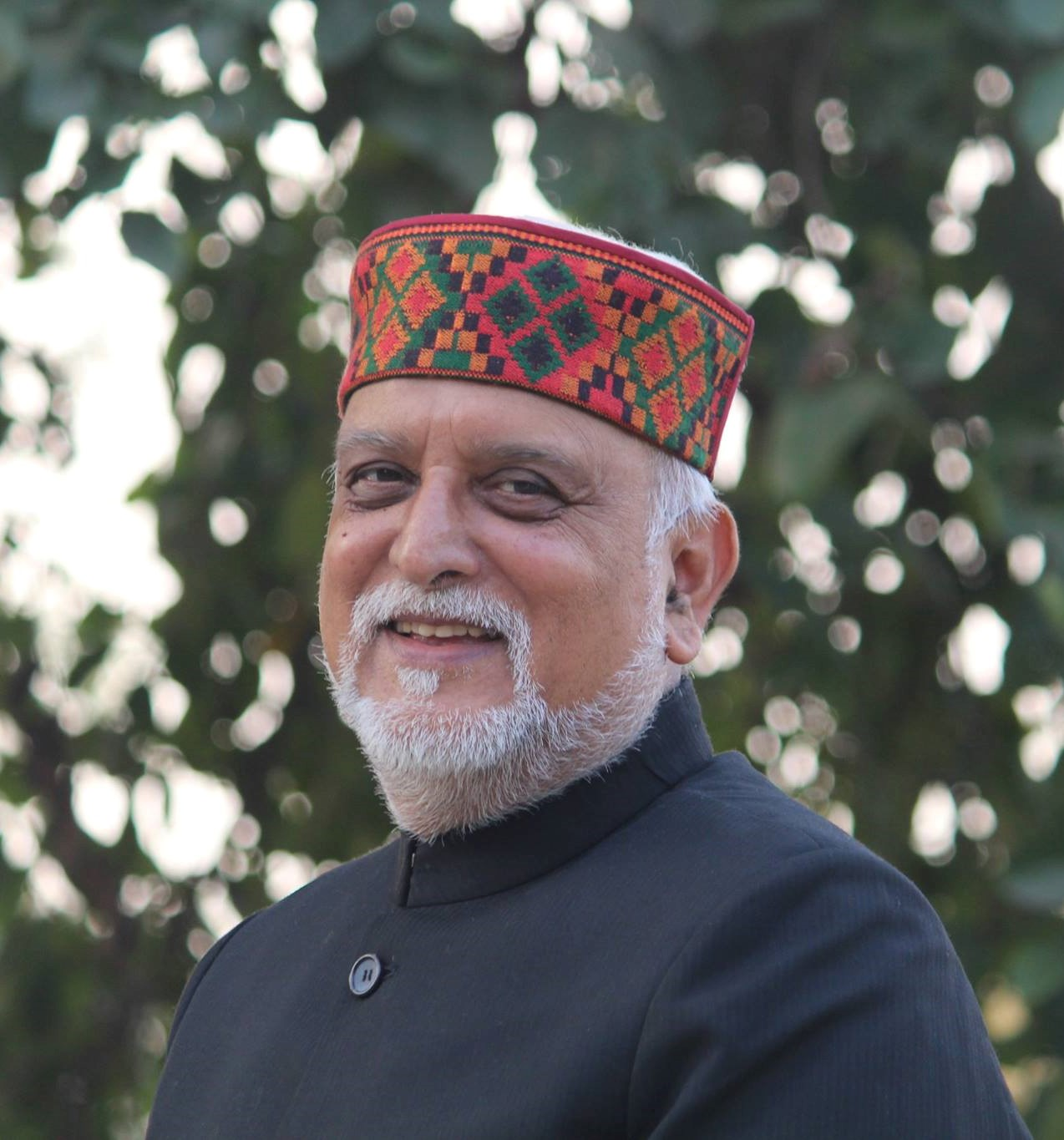
- Born: 20 December 1949 (age 76); Chhatarpur State, Vindhya Pradesh, India (present-day Chhatarpur, MP, India)
- Education: Jammuna Christian Inter College, Allahabad University of Allahabad (BA), Indore Christian College (MA)
- Spouse: Ruth Mangalwadi
- Children: 2
- Writing career
- Genre: Philosophical
- Movement: Revelation Movement
- Website: www.revelationmovement.com

Vishal Mangalwadi (born 20 December 1949) is an Indian Christian intellectual, a social reformer, political columnist, public speaker, and author of over 30 books. He is known for his work on the role of the Bible in shaping world history and culture.

== Early life ==
Mangalwadi was born in Chhattarpur, Madhya Pradesh, India, to Victor and Kusum Mangalwadi. He grew up in the states of Uttar Pradesh and Madhya Pradesh alongside his six siblings.

== Education and career ==
Mangalwadi graduated from the University of Allahabad in 1969 and earned an MA in Philosophy from the University of Indore in 1973.

In 1974, Mangalwadi co-founded the Theological Research and Communication Institute (TRACI) and began to develop his master's thesis into his first book, The World of Gurus. In 1977 Vikas Publishing House published The World of Gurus.

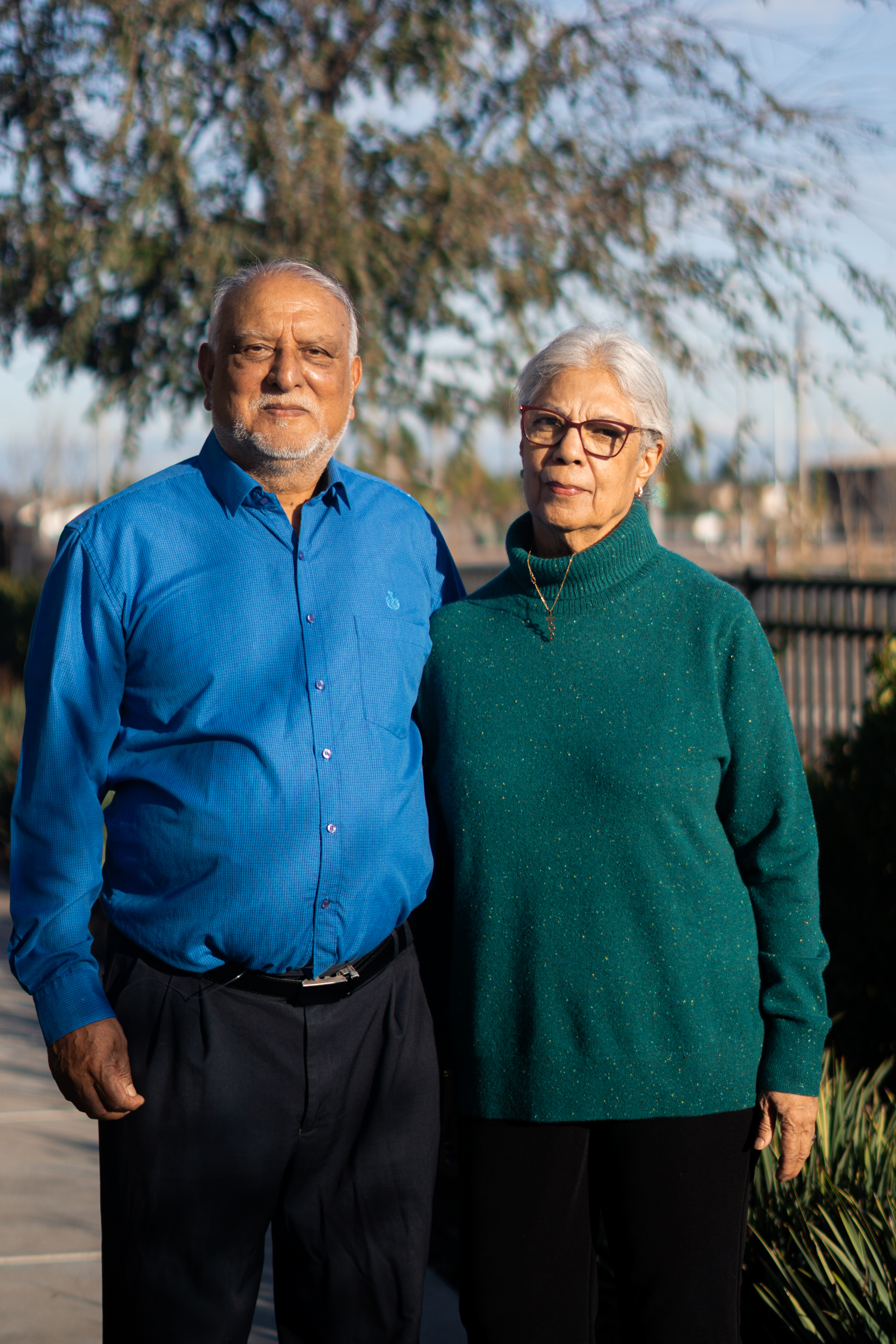
Vishal and Ruth Mangalwadi

In 1975, Mangalwadi married Ruth, from Bareilly (Uttar Pradesh), a graduate of Lucknow University, who returned to India after obtaining a Master's degree in theology from Wheaton College in Wheaton, Illinois, USA. In 1976, they moved to his father's farm in Gatheora village in Chhatarpur District and founded a non-profit organization, the Association For Comprehensive Rural Assistance (ACRA), to serve the rural poor and transform their caste-based feudal social system. His work was opposed and violently resisted.

In 1980, he was briefly incarcerated in the Tikamgarh Jail, where he began writing his second book, Truth and Social Reform. During the anti-Sikh riots that followed the assassination of Prime Minister Indira Gandhi in 1984, his headquarters was burned down.

From 1984 to 1987, Mangalwadi was the honorary director of TRACI and published Truth and Social Reform. In 1984, he was appointed the Convenor of the Peasant's Commission of the Janata Party.

In 1987, he initiated a national movement against the revival of sati.

From 1988 to 1994, he was an assistant to Kanshiram, the founder of the Bahujan Samaj Party.

In 2003, William Carey International University awarded him a Doctorate in Law. In 2009, he published the US edition of Truth and Transformation, encouraging local churches around the world to double up as centers of learning and service, offering tuition-free, internet-based college education. In 2010, he began a pilot project in Indonesia.

Since November 2013, Mangalwadi has been the Honorary Professor of Applied Theology in the Gospel and Plough Faculty of Theology at the Sam Higginbottom Institute of Agriculture, Technology, and Sciences (formerly an agricultural institute, but now deemed a university by the Government of India). From 2014 to 2017, he was the director of the Centre for Human Resource Development.

Mangalwadi and his wife established a religious ministry, "Revelation Movement", aiming "to re-establish the cultural authority of Veritas (Truth) because God has revealed Truth in scripture and God has given man the mind and clues to help us discover what He has concealed".

He has corresponded with Indian Prime Minister Narendra Modi about certain Hindu practices he considers to be dangerous.

In August 2024, Mangalwadi was awarded the President's Volunteer Service Medallion by the Biden White House for his contributions to education and social reform.

== Works ==
=== Books published ===
1. The World of Gurus - Cornerstone Pr Chicago,1977
2. Truth and Social Reform - Hodder & Stoughton,1989
3. In Search of Self: Beyond the New Age - Hodder & Stoughton, 1992
4. When The New Age Gets Old: Looking For a Greater Spirituality - Intervarsity, 1992
5. India: The Grand Experiment (How Victorian Evangelicalism Created Modern India) - Pippa Rann Books, 1997
6. Missionary Conspiracy: Letters to a postmodern Hindu (Letters to Arun Shourie) - The MacLaurin Institute, 1998
7. Why Must You Convert? - Nivedit Good Books Distributors, 1999
8. The Legacy of William Carey: A Model for the Transformation of a Culture - Crossway Books, 1999
9. The Bible in India (Wisdom from India Series) - Nivedit Good Books, 2000
10. Astrology (Wisdom from India Series) - Nivedit Good Books, 2000
11. Yoga: Seven Paths of Salvation In Hinduism (Wisdom from India Series) - Nivedit Good Books, 2000
12. Dear Rajan: Letter to a New Believer
13. The Quest For Freedom & Dignity: Caste, Conversion & Cultural Revolution - GLS Publishing, 2001
14. Spirituality of Hate: A Futuristic Perspective on Indo-Pakistan Conflict - Horizon Printers & Publishers, 2002
15. Truth and Transformation: A Manifesto for Ailing Nations - YWAM Publishing, 2009
16. Obama, The Presidency and the Bible
17. The Book That Made Your World: How the Bible Created the Soul of Western Civilization - Thomas Nelson Inc, 2011
18. Why Are We Backward: Roots, Myths and True Hope for Development - Forward Press, 2013
19. This Book Changed Everything: The Bible’s Amazing Impact on Our World - Nivedit Good Books, 2019
20. The Third Education Revolution : From Home School To Church College (Editor and Co-author) - Sought After Media, 2021
21. Conversion: The Revolution India Needs - 2023
22. GIRL: Abort or Empower Her (Co-author, Ruth Mangalwadi)
23. The Father of Modern India: William Carey (Co-author, Ruth Mangalwadi) - Sought After Media, 2023
24. Truth Transforms: A Manifesto for Ailing Nations - Sought After Media, 2024
25. The Bible and the Making of Modern India - Sought After Media, 2025
