= Kenneth Scott Latourette =

American historian, sinologist, and Christian missionary (1884–1968)

The Reverend Kenneth Scott Latourette
- Born: August 6, 1884; Oregon City, Oregon, U.S.
- Died: December 26, 1968 (aged 84); Oregon City, Oregon, U.S.
- Education: Linfield College; Yale University
- Awards: Order of Jade
- Scientific career
- Fields: History of China; History of Christianity; History of Japan
- Workplaces: Denison University; Reed College; Yale Divinity School

Kenneth Scott Latourette (August 6, 1884 – December 26, 1968) was an American Baptist minister and historian, specialized in Chinese studies, Japanese studies, and the history of Christianity. His formative experiences as a Christian missionary and educator in early 20th-century Imperial China shaped his life's work. Although he did not learn the Chinese language, he became known for his study of the history of China, the history of Japan, his magisterial scholarly surveys on world Christianity, and of American relations with East Asia.

== Early life ==
Latourette was born in Oregon City, Oregon, the son of DeWitt Clinton Latourette and Ella (Scott) Latourette. His mother and father both attended Pacific University in Forest Grove, Oregon, where they graduated in 1878. DeWitt Clinton Latourette worked as a lawyer in Oregon City.

The Latourette family migrated to Oregon during the 1860s; the family's origins can be traced back to early modern France, where their ancestors fled religious persecution as Huguenots and migrated to Staten Island, New York in the 1600s.

In 1904, Latourette was awarded a B.S. degree from Linfield College in Portland, Oregon. He continued his education at Yale University in New Haven, Connecticut, earning a B.A. in 1906, a M.A. in 1907, and a Ph.D. in 1909.

== Career ==
From 1909 through 1910, Latourette served as a traveling secretary for the Student Volunteer Movement for Foreign Missions. In 1910, he joined the faculty of Yale-in China's Yali School at Changsha, in the Hunan Province of Imperial China. He began to study the Chinese language, but in the summer of 1911 he contracted a severe case of amoebic dysentery and was forced to return to the United States.

As he began his recovery, Latourette joined the faculty at Reed College in Portland, Oregon; and from 1914 through 1916, he was a professor of history at Reed. In 1916, he accepted a position at Denison University, an institution with Baptist affiliations, in Granville, Ohio. His time at Denison lasted from 1916 through 1921. In 1918, while at Denison, Latourette was ordained as a Baptist minister.

Latourette joined the faculty of the Yale Divinity School in 1921. Latourette lived in a college dormitory suite during his time at Yale. He welcomed student groups to meet in the living room and was known as "Uncle Ken." He accepted appointment as the D. Willis James Professor of Missions and World Christianity (1921–1949), and he was later made the Sterling Professor of Missions and Oriental History (1949–1953). In 1938, he was named Chairman of the Department of Religion at Yale. He took on greater responsibilities in 1946 as Director of Graduate Studies at the Yale Divinity School. From his retirement in 1953 until his death in 1968, he was Sterling Professor Emeritus at the Divinity School.

Latourette was killed at age 84 when an automobile accidentally hit him in front of his family home in Oregon City, Oregon.

== Other achievements ==
Latourette served as president of the American Historical Association, the Association for Asian Studies, the American Baptist Convention, the American Baptist Foreign Mission Society and the Japan International Christian University Foundation.

He was a leader in the ecumenical movement, and he held leadership positions in the American Baptist Missionary Union, the International Board of the Y.M.C.A., the United Board for Christian Colleges in China and the World Council of Churches.

Throughout his life he remained active in the Yale-in-China Association.

At the Yale Divinity School, the "Latourette Initiative" is a proactive program to preserve and provide access to the documentation of world Christianity. It provides funding for the microfilming of published and archival resources documenting the history of Christian missions and Christian life.

=== Honors ===
Latourette was awarded honorary doctorates from seventeen universities in five countries.

In 1938 he received the Order of Jade from the Government of China.

He is also honored at the campus of William Carey International University in Pasadena, California. The institution's main library was called the Latourette Library. (The WCIU campus was sold to Education First and therefore no longer heralds Latourette's name).

Linfield College named a residence hall in his honor in 1946.

== Writings ==
Latourette was the author of over 80 books on Christianity, Oriental history and customs, and theological subjects.

He also wrote and spoke out about issues of his time, as for example, when he warned his fellow Americans in 1943 about the unwanted consequences of revenge after Japan should eventually lose the war they started with the surprise attack on Pearl Harbor in 1941. In addition, Latourette later wrote extensively on China.

The single work for which Latourette is most remembered is the seven-volume "A History of the Expansion of Christianity". Latourette noted within Volume 4 that only 5% of Americans in 1790 had formal ties to churches or synagogues.

Latourette's papers are archived in the Divinity Library Special Collections of the Yale University Library.

== Selected works ==
- Latourette, Kenneth Scott (1917), The History of Early Relations Between the United States and China, 1784–1844, New Haven: Yale University Press, OCLC 262540765.
- ——— (1917), The Development of China, Boston: Houghton Mifflin, ISBN 9780524076286, OCLC 504850 – full text online
- ——— (1918), The Development of Japan, New York: Macmillan, OCLC 1114012.
- ——— (1919), The Christian Basis of World Democracy, New York: MacMillan, OCLC 978620.
- ——— (1929), A History of Christian Missions in China, New York: MacMillan, OCLC 1494316.
- ——— (1934), The Chinese: Their History and Culture, New York: Macmillan, OCLC 220885107.
- ——— (1936), Missions Tomorrow, New York: Harper & Brothers, OCLC 500892.
- ——— (1945), A History of the Expansion of Christianity, New York: Harper & Bros, OCLC 277266105, 7 vol. comprehensive history of all missions and expansions
  - A history of the expansion of Christianity. 1. The first five centuries (1937)
  - A history of the expansion of Christianity. 2. The thousand years of uncertainty. 500–1500. (1938)
  - A history of expansion of christianity. 3.Three centuries of advance: A.D. 1500-A.D. 1800 (1939)
  - A history of expansion of Christianity. 4. The great century: in Europe and the United States of America; A.D. 1800-A.D. 1914 (1941)
  - A history of the expansion of Christianity. 5. The great century in the Americas, Australasia, and Africa. 1800–1914 (1943) online review
  - A history of the expansion of Christianity. 6, The great century in Northern Africa and Asia: A.D. 1800 - A.D. 1914 (1944)
  - A history of expansion of Christianity. 7. Advance through storm: AD 1914 and after, with concluding generalizations (1945)
- ——— (1946), The United States Moves Across the Pacific: The ABC's of the American Problem in the Western Pacific and the Far East, New York: Harper & Bros, OCLC 1099575.
- ——— (1947), The History of Japan, New York: MacMillan, OCLC 217535133.
- ——— (1946), A Short History of the Far East, New York: MacMillan, OCLC 1061096.
- ——— (January 1949) [December 29, 1948], "The Christian Understanding of History", American Historical Review (presidential address), Annual meeting, 54 (2), Washington: The American Historical Association: 259–276, doi:10.2307/1845386, JSTOR 1845386, archived from the original on July 7, 2010.
- ——— (1954), A History of Modern China, Harmondsworth, UK: Penguin Books Alt URL
- ——— (1967), Beyond the Ranges: the Autobiography of Kenneth Scott Latourette, Grand Rapids: William B Eerdmans, OCLC 996572.
- ——— (1958–69), Christianity in a Revolutionary Age: A History of Christianity in the Nineteenth and Twentieth Centuries, OCLC 382082.
  - ——— (1969), Christianity in a Revolutionary Age, vol. I: The Nineteenth Century in Europe: Background and the Roman Catholic Phase, Happer&Brothers.
  - ——— (1959), Christianity in a Revolutionary Age, vol. II: The Nineteenth Century in Europe: The Protestant and Eastern Churches.
  - ——— (1969), Christianity in a Revolutionary Age, vol. III: The Nineteenth Century Outside Europe: The Americas, the Pacific, Asia and Africa, Harper & Brothers. online
  - ——— (1958), Christianity in a Revolutionary Age, vol. IV: The Twentieth Century in Europe: The Roman Catholic, Protestant, and Eastern Churches.
  - ——— (1962), Christianity in a Revolutionary Age, vol. V: The Twentieth Century Outside Europe: The Americas, the Pacific, Asia, and Africa: The Emerging World Christian Community.
