= Manilal C. Parekh =

Indian Christian theologian

Manilal Chhotalal Parekh (1885–1967), a Gujarati convert to Anglican church, was an Indian Christian theologian, and the founder of Hindu Church of Christ - free from Western influence - opposing Western and institutional nature of Christianity in India.

He developed a new syncretistic Jesus-Yogi model, identifying himself as a Hindu disciple of Jesus Christ - although, Jesus never knew of Yoga, Parekh credited him with being a Yogi by birth. He authored several books, especially A Hindu's Portrait of Christ that constructed a portrait of Christ from a Hindu point of view.

== Biography ==
=== Early life ===
Parekh was born in 1885 at Rajkot of western Gujarat, India, in a family already following Jainism and Vaishnavism, specifically followed by his father.

It is said that his illness drew him closer to God in 1903; consequently, he read the entire Bible and a book about Swami Narayana in Gujarati language. Prior to that, at the age of fifteen, he seems to have already read The Use of Life written by John Lubbock, 1st Baron Avebury, and also The Imitation of Christ influencing him in moral and spiritual attraction at a younger age. After entering the University in Bombay, he was influenced and introduced to Christ through Christ-centric writings of Keshub Chunder Sen, a renowned leader of Brahmo Samaj; later, he served at Church of New Dispensation, founded by Keshub Chunder Sen, for some years. He was baptized to an Anglican church in Bombay on 6 February 1918, and thereby embraced Christianity. He considered himself as "Christian Hindu", having interpreted Hindu as a name[term] derived from river Indus in both national and cultural context, rather than religious context.

=== Hindu-Christian baptism ===
He was baptised into the Anglican Church, as he believed that he had no right to preach Christ without openly professing to be a disciple of Christ - he took baptism considering it as "a purely spiritual sacramental, signifying the dedication of the new disciple of Christ." He felt that any new disciple or convert of Christ ought to remain within his community and considered baptism in India as "joining community which stands as a distinct social and political body with its own airs and aspirations which are very often antithetical and far from Christian"; hence, he lived as a Hindu-Christian, consciously Christian, but in Hindu surroundings like Brahmabandhab Upadhyay, Narayan Vaman Tilak, and Pandita Ramabai - all these were said to be Hindus by birth, but claimed to remain Christians. He denounced the Westernized church, as he felt it had become more communal body that was more political and social, rather than spiritual; furthermore, he felt culturally Church was "anti-national," and lost its identity as Christian. He did not believe that the Christian Church as set up in Europe would be able to adapt to the Indian way of life, eg, with the culture of vegetarianism being a normal way of life in India.

=== Hindu Church of Christ ===
Having studied the Bible, he interpreted the victory of Jesus in accepting the Cross in a non-violent way; he considered the Christian church as the invention of Europeans and denounced the Christian church to have become a civil community, instead of a spiritual fellowship. According to him:

It is very significant that the discovery of the true Jesus as distinguished from that of the Western Churches and Missions is largely due to the Hindu Mind.

Having disillusioned by the westernized and materialistic attitude of the Church, he severed his ties with missions and churches, but remained committed to Jesus Christ, portraying himself as "Hindu disciple of Christ." As he was not comfortable and against the traditional concept of the Church as a separate religious community, he more or less kept loose association with Anglican church; instead, he advocated the House Church as a fellowship within the framework of Hindu cultural, and social categories.

The Hindu church will not be "hyper-organization" now existing as Church, but more as the Satsang (the informal gathering of truth-seekers for sharing and fellowship) as in the Hindu tradition.

He founded the Hindu Church of Christ which he saw as being free from the Western concept of Church; furthermore, he named his home in Rajkot as Oriental Christ House.

== Gandhi Vs Parekh ==
Parekh, who had met Gandhi, co-authored Mahatma Gandhi An Essay in Appreciation with R.M. Gray. Like Gandhi, Parekh mulled over the concept of Swadharmagraha, naming it as Hindu Swadharmagraha, insisting on the religion of one's birth; however, Parekh differed from Gandhi, preferring to create an eclectic religion - composed of various [best] doctrines and beliefs. Accordingly, Parekh conceptualised Hindu Swadharmagraha giving more space to Christ and prophets of foreign religions, as God's own messengers.

Like Gandhi, he affirmed that full spiritual fellowship was possible without breaking the Caste-system; furthermore, he defended and advocated the practice of caste system in the Indian churches.

Gandhi, being a non-Christian, acknowledged the moral excellence of Jesus Christ and the relevance of his teachings, with or without a personal commitment to him - however Gandhi did not convert to Christianity. Parekh, a convert from non-Christian religion to Christianity, personally committed to Christ with conversion by retaining his former religious identity - therefore seeing himself as belonging to multiple religions. Gandhi directed his apologetic against the claims that Christianity is a superior religion, while Parekh tried to fuse together Christianity and all other theistic religions retaining Hindu identity.

Gandhi preferred an ethical model of Jesus and was more interested in his teachings rather than historical Jesus, while Parekh formulated his own ascetical Jesus-Yogi model. Parekh didn't use religion for political reasons, while Gandhi blended religion into politics - both Gandhi and Parekh, however, supported Harijan [politics] like eating with them and worshipping with them, with no regard to education in any of their doctrines.

== Jesus yogi model ==
Parekh believed that Jesus had achieved the highest communion with God, and asserted that Jesus' power to do miracles can be achieved by every human being through the practice of yoga. In his book, A Hindu's Portrait of Jesus Christ, he considered the risen Christ as fully human than the historical Jesus. He credited Jesus with being a yogi by birth, although nowhere it is mentioned that Jesus knew nor followed yoga technique.

=== A Hindu's Portrait of Christ ===
He published A Hindu's Portrait of Jesus Christ in 1953 at Rajkot and proclaimed as "My most humble tribute to Jesus Christ, whose 'Hindu disciple' i have been for the last forty years." [sic] This book is by and large considered as a profound study of Jesus Christ by any Hindu in a systematic way in dealing with Jesus' life and meaning. His portrait of Jesus is largely drawn from Synoptic Gospels, following the Markan Chronology of events.

==== Salient points ====
- Regarding the Virgin birth of Christ, he says "The Hindus have treated it as a pious myth." [sic]
- He sees Jesus as a great preacher or prophet, certainly beyond Mahavira and Buddha, as he turned instinctively to the poor and the despised, the outcaste and the sinner.
- He denounces the Fourth Gospel (a.k.a. Gospel of John) denying Jesus' raising of Lazarus, however, he had no doubt that Jesus worked miracles. According to him, the body of Jesus was not raised, but remained where it was; however, the Resurrection was only in appearance like that of Swami Narayana.
- Regarding the death of Christ, he observes "There is no doubt, however, that we are here face to face with the greatest tragedy enacted on the earth." [sic]
- He sees Jesus as more than an Avatara, but a bit less than God.

== Works ==
- Sri Swami Narayana : (a gospel of Bhagwat-dharma, or, God in redemptive action).
- Mahatma Gandhi An Essay in Appreciation (with R. M. Gray) (1925)
- Rajarshi Ram Mohan Roy (1927)
- The Brahma Samaj : a short history.
- Keshub Chunder Sen: His Relation to Christianity.
- The gospel of Zoroaster: (the Iranian Veda) (1939)
- Jharathustano dharma: Irānīyana Vedadharma (1942)
- Sri Vallabhacharya: Life, teachings and movement, a religion of grace (1943)
- Christian Proselytism in India - A Great and Growing Menace (1947)
- A Hindu's Portrait of Christ: A Gospel of God's Free Gift of His Sonship (1953)

== See also ==
- Insider movements among Hindus
