= C. Peter Wagner =

American missionary and author (1930–2016)

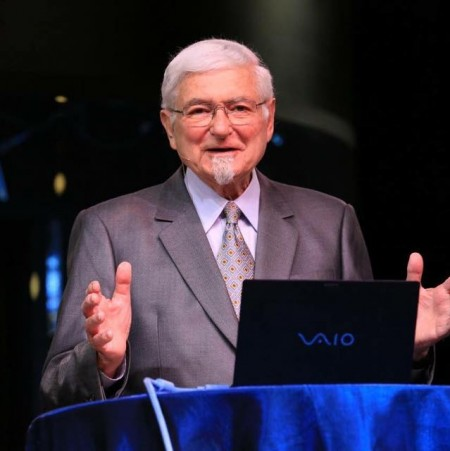
Charles Peter Wagner

Charles Peter Wagner (August 15, 1930 – October 21, 2016) was an American missionary, writer, teacher and founder of several Independent Charismatic Christian organizations. In his earlier years, Wagner was known as a key leader of the Church Growth Movement and later for his writings on spiritual warfare.

== Biography ==
=== Early life ===
Wagner was born in 1930 in New York City.

=== Education ===
Wagner was trained at Fuller Theological Seminary, Princeton Theological Seminary, and Fuller's School of World Missions. He received a Ph.D. from the University of Southern California in social ethics in 1977. He was ordained by the Conservative Congregational Christian Conference.

=== Missionary work ===
Wagner served as a missionary in Bolivia under the South American Mission and Andes Evangelical Mission (now SIM International), the latter of which he eventually became the general director of, from 1956 to 1971. He then served for 30 years as Professor of Church Growth at the Fuller Theological Seminary's School of World Missions until his retirement in 2001. During his time at Fuller, Peter was largely recognized as the leading authority on the Church Growth Movement after his mentor and the founder of the movement, Donald McGavran, passed the succession to him. The acceptance of Peter's teachings on church growth by churches across the world was due in part to the use of Fuller Theological Seminary as a platform to spread the message. Together, both McGavran and Wagner led the Fuller Evangelistic Association to continue to spread the message of church growth.

He authored 80 books and was the founding president of Global Harvest Ministries from 1993 to 2011 and founder and chancellor emeritus of Wagner Leadership Institute (now Wagner University), an unaccredited institution which trains revivalists and reformers to bring about a global movement of transformation. He also founded Reformation Prayer Network, International Coalition of Apostles, Eagles' Vision Apostolic Team, the Apostolic Council for Educational Accountability (now Academic Council for Educational Accountability) and the Hamilton Group and served as vice president of Global Spheres, Inc.

He died in 2016 at the age of 86.

== Theology ==
=== Spiritual warfare ===
Wagner wrote about spiritual warfare, in books including Confronting the Powers: How the New Testament Church Experienced the Power of Strategic-Level Spiritual Warfare and Engaging the Enemy. New Apostolic Reformation prophet Cindy Jacobs was a main influence on this aspect of Wagner's theology. In Confronting the Powers, Wagner breaks down spiritual warfare as having three levels: "Ground Level: Person-to-person, praying for each other's personal needs. Occult Level: deals with demonic forces released through activities related to Satanism, witchcraft, astrology and many other forms of structured occultism. Strategic-Level or Cosmic-Level: To bind and bring down spiritual principalities and powers that rule over governments."

Wagner's method of accomplishing strategic-level spiritual warfare involves six steps:

- The area is selected. "Prayer armies" are deployed for a large area (e.g. the 40/70 window between 40 and 70 degrees north latitude).
- The participants establish unity together; particularly, the pastors as "spiritual gatekeepers" of an area must join.
- Building on this, Christian congregations in an area should also join for the purpose of spiritual warfare.
- The prayer warriors prepare themselves for the upcoming spiritual warfare through personal sanctification.
- Christians with the spiritual gift of prophecy locate and identify the demons to be found in the area (spiritual mapping). For example, places with pagan or Nazi history are identified as their strongholds.
- Practical prayer warfare, specifically as a prayer march: the believers proclaim God's power and command the demons to leave, tearing down their strongholds.

According to Wagner, these methods "were virtually unknown to the majority of Christians before the 1990s". The premise of Engaging the Enemy is that Satan and his demons are literally in the world, that Satan's territorial spirit-demons may be identified by name, and that Christians are to engage in spiritual warfare with them.

Wagner preached a fivefold ministry view based on Ephesians 4:13, in which apostles, prophets, evangelists, pastors, and teachers are considered legitimate offices of the church. While mainline Protestant denominations see prophets and apostles as dispensed of within the early period of Christianity, Wagner's spiritual-warfare theology depicted these figures as prayer-warriors actively interceding in the contemporary world. These prayer warriors are responsible for ushering in the return of Jesus and the Kingdom of God through warfare prayer.

In Hard-Core Idolatry: Facing the Facts, Wagner asserts that idolizing Catholic saints brings honor to the spirits of darkness, and promotes the burning of their statues in Argentina. Wagner also asserts that the Holy Spirit came to his associate, Cindy Jacobs (a prophet in Wagner's Apostolic Council of Prophetic Elders) and "told her that in [the Argentinian city of] Resistencia they need to burn the idols, like the magicians did in Ephesus in Acts of the Apostles".

Wagner had close ties to Ted Haggard's New Life Church, which found an early focus on spiritual mapping and confronting territorial spirits through strategic-level spiritual warfare. The church "and the adjacent World Prayer Center that was dedicated in 1998 were, for roughly a decade, the epicenter of an ongoing, radical redefinition of Christianity."

=== New Apostolic Reformation ===
Wagner used the term New Apostolic Reformation (NAR) to describe what he observed as a movement within Pentecostal and charismatic churches. The title is not an organization and does not have formal membership. Wagner's organizational acumen helped the movement expand through networks of apostles and prophets and their organizations, while their ideas, such as dominionism, and more specifically the Seven Mountain Mandate, also spread back into the movement.

In response to an NPR article entitled "The New Apostolic Reformation: The Evangelicals Engaged in Spiritual Warfare", Wagner stated to Charisma News, "The roots of the NAR go back to the beginning of the African Independent Church Movement in 1900, the Chinese House Church Movement beginning in 1976, the U.S. Independent Charismatic Movement beginning in the 1970s and the Latin American Grassroots Church Movement beginning around the same time. I was neither the founder nor a member of any of these movements, I was simply a professor who observed that they were the fastest growing churches in their respective regions and that they had a number of common characteristics."

The term NAR has been described as "relatively well established in the academic community". Religion scholar and theologian Geir Otto Holmås states that the "NAR is not a denomination or an organization with membership lists and an unambiguous doctrinal foundation, but a loose movement which primarily operates through informal or semi-formal channels," continuing on to say that the movement is spread in bits and pieces: religion scholar Matthew D. Taylor terms this "prophetic memes". Holmås states that "this explains the slightly odd fact that that people who are associated with the NAR do not necessarily identify with the movement. Some of them will not even have heard the term 'New Apostolic Reformation'".

Baptist professor and theologian Roger Olson writes on his blog, "...the closer I looked at the NARM [New Apostolic Reformation Movement] the less convinced I was that it is a cohesive movement at all. It seems more like a kind of umbrella term for a loose collection of independent ministries that have a few common interests...I have examined the web sites of several independent evangelists who claim to represent that affinity...So far none of them seem blatantly heretical. Eccentric, non-mainline, a bit fanatical, maybe." Another term coined by Wagner is the Third Wave of the Holy Spirit. The NAR includes key elements of the Third Wave such as claims of miraculous healing.

Wagner provided the key differences between the NAR and traditional Protestantism in his article "The New Apostolic Reformation is Not a Cult". He noted that those participating in the movement believe the Apostles' Creed and adhere to orthodox Christian doctrine.

=== Dominionism ===
In his 1998 book Churchquake!, Wagner denied that NAR had any political orientation. Ten years later he published Dominion!, an endorsement of dominion theology which seeks to institute a nation governed by Christians and based on their understandings of biblical law: "the church should be governed primarily by charismatic apostles and prophets, who will lead it into concerted and orchestrated campaigns of strategic-level spiritual warfare, through which the church can transform societies."

== Selected works ==
- Latin American Theology. Radical or Evangelical, Eerdmans, 1970.
- Your Spiritual Gifts Can Help Your Church Grow, Regal Books, 1979, 1994, 2005. ISBN 0-8307-3697-2
- Strategies for Church Growth, Regal Books, 1987. ISBN 0-8307-1170-8
- How to Have a Healing Ministry, Regal Books, 1988. ISBN 0-8307-1297-6
- The New Apostolic Churches, Regal Books, 1998 ISBN 0-8307-2137-1
- Churchquake!, Regal Books, 1999. ISBN 0-8307-1918-0
- Changing Church, Regal Books, 2004. ISBN 0-8307-3278-0
- Breaking Strongholds in Your City, Regal Books, 1993. ISBN 0-8307-1638-6
- Freedom from the Religious Spirit, Regal Books, 2005. ISBN 0-8307-3670-0
- Engaging the Enemy, Regal Books, 1991.
- Prayer Warrior Series, Regal Books, 1992–1997.
  - Warfare Prayer: How to Seek God's Power and Protection in the Battle to Build His Kingdom ISBN 0-8307-1534-7
  - Prayer shield: How to intercede for pastors, Christian leaders, and others on the spiritual frontlines ISBN 0-8307-1573-8
  - Confronting the Powers: How the New Testament Church Experienced the Power of Strategic-Level Spiritual Warfare ISBN 0-8307-1819-2
  - Praying With Power : How to Pray Effectively and Hear Clearly from God ISBN 0-8307-1919-9
- Dominion: How Kingdom Action Can Change the World, Chosen Books, 2008. ISBN 978-0-8007-9435-4
- The Book Of Acts: A Commentary, Regal Books, 2008. ISBN 978-0-8307-4595-1

== See also ==
- Apostolic-Prophetic Movement
- Independent Network Charismatic Christianity

== Sources ==
- Marsden, George M. (1987). Reforming Fundamentalism: Fuller Seminary and the New Evangelicalism. Grand Rapids: William B. Eerdmans. pp. 292–295. ISBN 9780802836427.
- Taylor, Matthew D. (October 1, 2024). The Violent Take it by Force: The Christian Movement That Is Threatening Our Democracy. Minneapolis: Broadleaf Books. ISBN 9781506497785.
- Wagner, C. Peter (1996). Confronting the Powers: How the New Testament Church Experienced the Power of Strategic-Level Spiritual Warfare. The Prayer Warrior series. Ventura, Calif.: Regal Books. ISBN 978-0-8307-1819-1 – via Google Books.
