= Manilal Dand =

Indian philanthropist

Manilal Dand is a former businessman who has set up and runs a library for underprivileged children in Mazgaon, Mumbai. Manilal used to work for the Chacha Nehru Toy library in Bandra. When the library closed, he converted his former spice factory in Mazgaon into a children's library.
