= James Emery (missionary) =

American missionary

Dr. James Emery served as a missionary in Guatemala with the Presbyterian Church, and was co-founder of the Theological Education by Extension movement there, and then taught at Missionary Internship (MI and CO) until his death in 1999.
