= Church Growth =

Evangelical Christian movement

The Church Growth movement is a movement within evangelical Christianity which aims to grow churches based on research, sociology, analysis, etc. The Church Growth movement sees its origins in the Great Commission, and seeing people come to the knowledge of Christ. Donald McGavran, a seminal figure in the movement, asserted that "It is God's will that women and men become disciples of Jesus Christ and responsible members of Christ's church".

== History ==
The Church Growth movement began with the publication of Donald McGavran's book The Bridges of God. McGavran was a third-generation Christian missionary to India, where his observations of how churches grow went beyond typical theological discussion to discern sociological factors that affected receptivity to the Christian Gospel among non-Christian peoples. In 1965, he organized the School of World Mission at Fuller Theological Seminary in Pasadena, California, which was the institutional homebase for Church Growth studies until after his death. It has been the training ground for tens of thousands of pastors and missionaries of one hundred mainly evangelical denominations.

McGavran used statistical research to show that the typical missiological strategy of the time, mission stations, was largely ineffective in reaching people for Christ, as well as ineffective in discipleship.

The original goal of the Church Growth movement was to reach groups of people, as opposed to random individuals, with the gospel within the United States. The goal was to understand how to share Christianity in a culturally appropriate way, given the changing climate in the United States. McGavran stated that in order to reach people of different cultures, their culture must be first understood, in order to present the gospel in a manner relevant to them. Paul's missionary journeys, it was argued, used the same cultural relevance, which eventually led to the council at Jerusalem (Acts 15) which determined whether Gentile converts must adopt Jewish culture in order to become Christian.

Stetzer states that the Church Growth movement went astray when it became overly simplified into a series of formulas for church growth, and ultimately led to the very thing McGavran sought to avoid, namely a new kind of mission station. Stetzer states too many of the churches following the emerging formulas became a socially-engineered mission station, which drew people out of their own cultures, into Christian warehouses and away from their neighborhoods and communities where they lived.

== Methods ==
Two key attributes of Church Growth are a passion for the Great Commission and a willingness to apply research to attracting members, including quantitative methods. Scholars and leaders from many denominations continue to meet annually to discuss the implications of these insights as the American Society for Church Growth.

The "seeker-sensitive" label is associated with some megachurches in the United States where Christian messages are often imparted by means of elaborate creative elements emphasizing secular popular culture, such as popular music styles. Such churches often also develop a wide range of activities to draw in families at different stages in their lives.

Four key approaches include:

- The "Attractive Church Model", which was set forth by Rick Warren's book, The Purpose Driven Church. In this model, programs (such as daycare, sports programs, classes, and contemporary music and worship) are created which attract people from the community to the church.
- The "Missional Church Model", which was set forth by Michael Slaughter of Ginghamsburg UMC. In this model, missional activities are developed to which people are drawn to participate. As they participate, they gradually become involved in the life of the church.
- The "Preach God to Friends and Neighbors Model", set forth by Brian L. Boley's book, How to Share the Gospel: A Proven Approach for Ordinary People. In this model, members of the congregation begin to preach God to friends and neighbors. As they preach God, they are eventually seen as "God-experts", and people begin to inquire of them about spiritual issues.
- The "Soul Winning Model" has always been trumpeted by Bible-believing Christians, but heavily more recently with the announcement of a National Church Growth Conference being held at Clays Mill Road Baptist Church in Lexington, Kentucky.

== Criticism and praise ==
Critics from other Christian groups suggest the movement is "only about numbers" and "success" oriented. Additional criticism has been level in recent years by authors noting that the church growth movement has coincided with the rise in Christian celebrity culture. Karl Vaters, particularly has been blunt about this, noting that "Christian celebrity culture guarantees moral failure." Vaters' recent book "De-sizing the Church" argues that an obsessive focus on church growth strategies have also contributed to a rise in pastoral discouragement.

In 2007, Willow Creek Community Church conducted a major survey that revealed that heavy involvement into programs and activities did not necessarily translate into discipleship unless the church had a clear path for believers' development. In response, Chuck Colson stated, "I am cheering Willow Creek on. Think what could happen if, instead of tickling ears, all the churches gave the people real meat." Colson did not outright praise or condemn the church growth movement, instead stating that "During the Reformation, the reformers had a phrase for this spirit. It was called semper reformandi, or always reforming. The more we continue to understand that we have not arrived, and the more willing we are to adopt the humble approach that we and our churches are in need of continual reformation, the more our churches and lives will come to reflect the God we preach."

== See also ==
- C. Peter Wagner, figure in the Church Growth movement

== Literature ==
- Schacke, Rainer (2009). Learning from Willow Creek?. Göttingen: Cuvillier. ISBN 978-3-86955-104-3.
- Hornsby, William 'Billy', The Attractional Church, Faith Words – Hachette.
