= U.S. Center for World Mission =

Campus in Pasadena, USA (1976–2019)

The U.S. Center for World Mission, later known as the Venture Center, was a collaborative Christian mission base in Pasadena, California from 1976 until 2019. The center sought to connect other like-minded organizations around prayer, research, innovation, media, education, strategy, and mobilization with a continued focus on unreached people groups.

== History ==
Spouses Ralph D. Winter (1924-2009) and Roberta Winter (1930-2001) founded the U.S. Center for World Mission in 1976 in a few rented offices on the campus of Pasadena Nazarene College. Their purpose was to pull people together to concentrate on the unreached people groups. The campus had previously hosted the Nazarene University Pasadena campus, and earlier the Pacific Bible College and Pasadena College (1897-1976).

When the Pasadena Nazarene College campus was up for sale, the U.S. Center engaged in a bidding war with the Church Universal and Triumphant, which the U.S. Center won. The money came primarily through small gifts of individual Christians around the country, and through the efforts of televangelist Dr. William Davis who promoted the project on national television and traveled across the country to meet personally with wealthy Christian donors. The final payment for the campus was made in 1988.

The Center sought to serve the mission movement with resources, information, and strategic insights to the movement grow and effectively reach all the unreached peoples. In 2015, the US Center was renamed the Venture Center.

The Venture Center and its affiliated ministries were run by members of Frontier Ventures, which was founded by Ralph D. Winter. In 2019 the center was sold as part of Frontier Ventures' move to a decentralized model.

== Legacy ==
Archives of the center now reside at the Ralph D. Winter Research Center. Many Christian ministries had their genesis at the center or resided for a season before moving on to new locations throughout the world.

== Venture Center Ministries ==
- Mission Frontiers magazine
- Global Prayer Digest
- Joshua Project
- Roberta Winter Institute
- INSIGHT (an acronym for: INtensive Study of Integrated Global History and Theology. One or two year college-level course.)
- International Journal of Frontier Missiology
- William Carey International University
- Perspectives Global
- Prime
- William Carey Publishing
- Perspectives on the World Christian movement, a 15-week course.

== See also ==
- Providence Christian College in Pasadena, California
