= William Carey Publishing =

American Christian publisher (1969-)

- Formerly: William Carey Library
- Type: non-profit Organization
- Industry: Publishing
- Founded: 1969; 57 years ago
- Headquarters: Pasadena, California, United States
- Key people: Dr. Ralph Winter, Founder
- Products: Christian mission books
- Number of employees: 6 (2006)
- Website: missionbooks.org

William Carey Publishing, previously known as William Carey Library, is an American book publishing company based in Pasadena, California. It was one of the first companies to exclusively publish Christian mission resources. William Carey Library is part of the U.S. Center for World Mission and was named after missionary William Carey, known as the "father of modern missions."

== History ==
Upon celebrating its 50th anniversary, 1969–2019, William Carey Library rebranded to William Carey Publishing. While the organization is still focused on publishing missiological resources, it is expanding the breadth of its offerings to accommodate the needs of the next 50 years in missions. William Carey Publishing also relocated in 2018 to Littleton, Colorado.
