= Donald McGavran =

American Christian academic (1897–1990)

Donald Anderson McGavran (December 15, 1897 – July 10, 1990) was a missiologist and founding Dean of the School of World Mission at Fuller Theological Seminary in Pasadena, California, and is known for his work related to evangelism and religious conversion. McGavran is widely regarded as the most influential missiologist of the 20th century.

McGavran identified differences of caste and economic social position as major barriers to the spread of Christianity. His work substantially changed the methods by which missionaries identify and prioritize groups of persons for missionary work and stimulated the Church Growth Movement. McGavran developed his church growth principles after rejecting the popular view that mission was ‘philanthropy, education, medicine, famine relief, evangelism, and world friendship’ and become convinced that good deeds – while necessary – ‘must never replace the essential task of mission, discipling the peoples of the earth’. McGavran was also a co-founder of the Evangelical Missiological Society.

== Early life and education ==
McGavran was born in Damoh, India, in 1897. Following his father and grandfather, McGavran became the third generation of missionaries in his family.

He received his early education in Central Provinces, India. After his family returned to the United States, he went to school in Tulsa and Indianapolis. He attended Butler University (B.A., 1920), Yale Divinity School (B.D., 1922), the former College of Mission, Indianapolis (M.A., 1923), and, following two terms in India, Columbia University (Ph.D., 1936).

== Missionary career ==
Through the influence of John R. Mott and the Student Volunteer Movement, McGavran went to India as a missionary in 1923, working primarily as an educator under appointment with the United Christian Missionary Society of the Christian Church (Disciples of Christ). In 1927 he became director of religious education for his mission, before returning to the United States to work on his Ph.D. at Columbia University. After his return to India, he was elected field secretary in 1932 and placed in charge of administering the denomination's entire India mission.

During his time in India, McGavran was deeply influenced by J. Waskom Pickett, once saying: "I lit my candle at Pickett’s fire." In 1928 Pickett was asked by the National Christian Council of India, Burma, and Ceylon to make an extensive study of the phenomenon in India of "Christian mass movements," that is, mass conversion of certain sectors of Indian society.

McGavran read Pickett's book and recommended to his mission headquarters in Indianapolis that they employ the services of Pickett to study why similar mass movements to Christ were not happening in their ministry area of mid-India. As supervisor of eighty missionaries and various medical and educational institutions, McGavran had become concerned that after several decades of work his mission had only about thirty small churches, all of which were experiencing little growth. At the same time, he saw "people movements" in scattered areas of India where thousands of people in groups, rather than as individuals, were becoming Christians. McGavran assisted Pickett in the study and became the chief architect of the study in Madhya Pradesh.

In 1937 McGavran wrote a book called Founders of the India Church in which he turned the spotlight on humble Indians who began people movements. McGavran discovered that of the 145 areas where mission activity was taking place, 134 had grown only eleven percent between 1921 and 1931. The churches in those areas were not even conserving their own children in the faith. Yet, in the other eleven areas the church was growing by one hundred percent, one hundred fifty percent, and even two hundred percent a decade. He wondered why some churches were growing, while others, often just a few miles away, were not.

During this same time period, McGavran was quietly changing his view of mission and theology. In the formative years of his childhood, mission was held to be carrying out the Great Commission, winning the world for Christ, and saving lost humanity. This was the view McGavran held when he returned to the United States for his higher education. While attending Yale Divinity School, McGavran was introduced to the teachings of the influential Christian professor H. Richard Niebuhr. According to McGavran, Niebuhr "used to say that mission was everything the church does outside its four walls. It was philanthropy, education, medicine, famine relief, evangelism, and world friendship." McGavran espoused this view of mission when he went to the mission field in 1923. As he became involved in education, social work, and evangelism in India, he gradually reverted to his earlier position that mission was about making disciples of Jesus Christ.

When McGavran's three-year term as mission secretary was up in 1936, he was not reelected. According to McGavran, in effect the mission said to him, “Since you are talking so much about evangelism and church growth, we are going to locate you in a district where you can practice what you preach”. McGavran accepted his new appointment and spent the next seventeen years trying to start a people movement among the Satnamis caste. About one thousand people were won to Christ, fifteen small village churches were planted, and the Gospels were translated into Chhattisgarhi.

== Institute of Church Growth ==
In 1958, McGavran resigned from his mission work and proposed to a number of American seminaries the possibility of starting a department focused on the subject of church growth. It was not until 1961 when the Institute of Church Growth was established at Northwest Christian College, now Bushnell University, in Eugene, Oregon. Eventually in 1965, David Allan Hubbard invited McGavran to become the first dean of School of World Mission at Fuller Theological Seminary in Pasadena, California.

McGavran recruited a number of top missiologists and established the largest missions related faculty for any school in the world. McGavran's leadership also helped Fuller's School of World Mission to become the largest missions school in the world by number of students.

McGavran, along with his pupil Peter Wagner, created the Fuller Evangelistic Association to apply his church growth methodologies to churches around the world with Fuller serving as their platform. He also created the Institute for American Church Growth in order to focus in on growth in America which was distinct as a nation state due to its ethnic and cultural diversity in its demographics.

Based on his lectures in Eugene and later at Fuller, McGavran published the book Understanding Church Growth (1970). In the work, McGavran articulated a key feature of his church growth theory, known as the "homogenous unit principle." Drawing from his experiences in India of mass movements, the homogenous unit principle reasoned that individuals are more likely to convert to Christianity en masse when they share similar demographics.

== See also ==
- Christian mission
- Church Growth
